= 2026 Minnesota Senate election =

Legislative election in Minnesota

- November 3, 2026

All 67 seats in the Minnesota Senate 34 seats needed for a majority
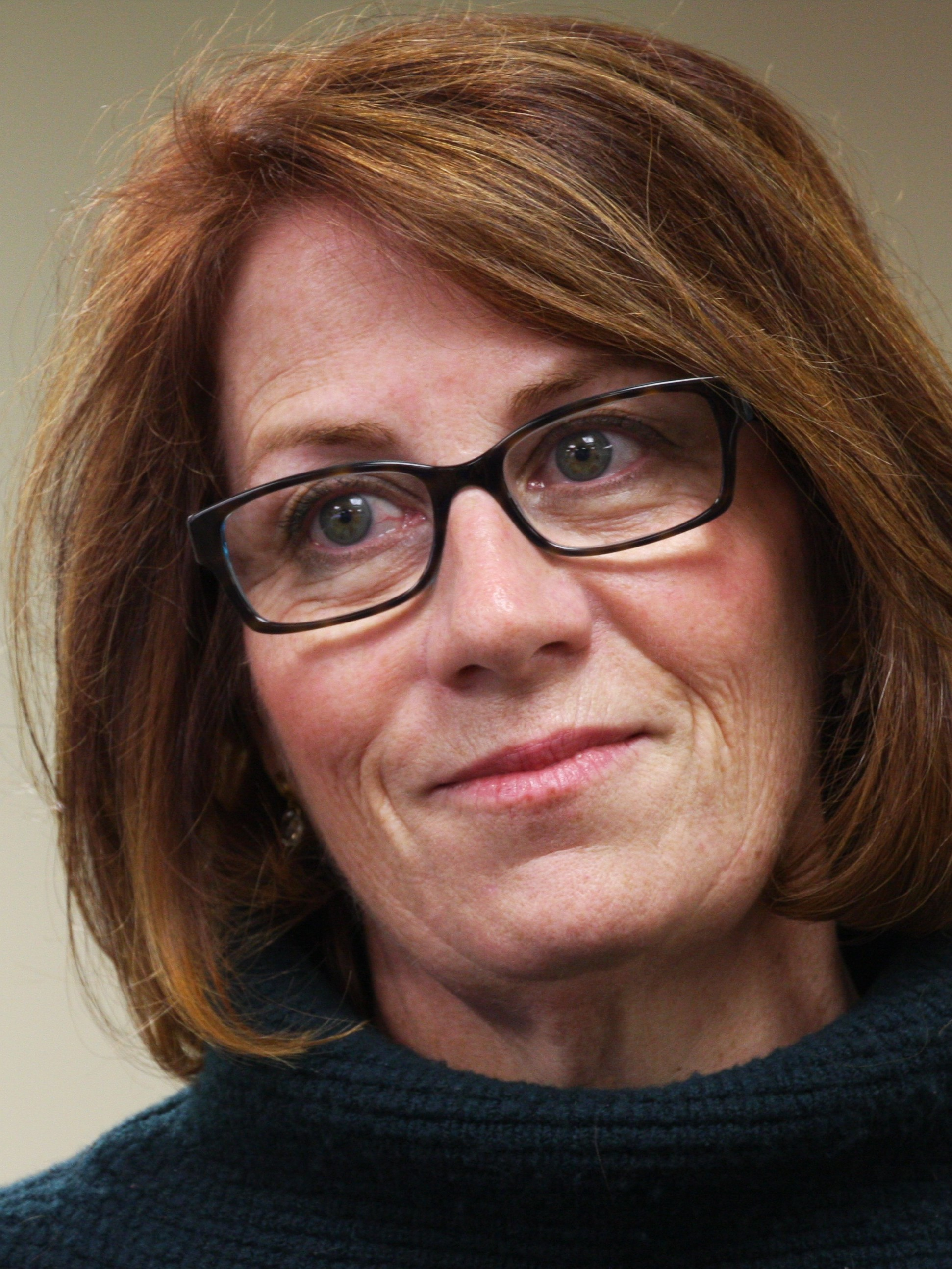

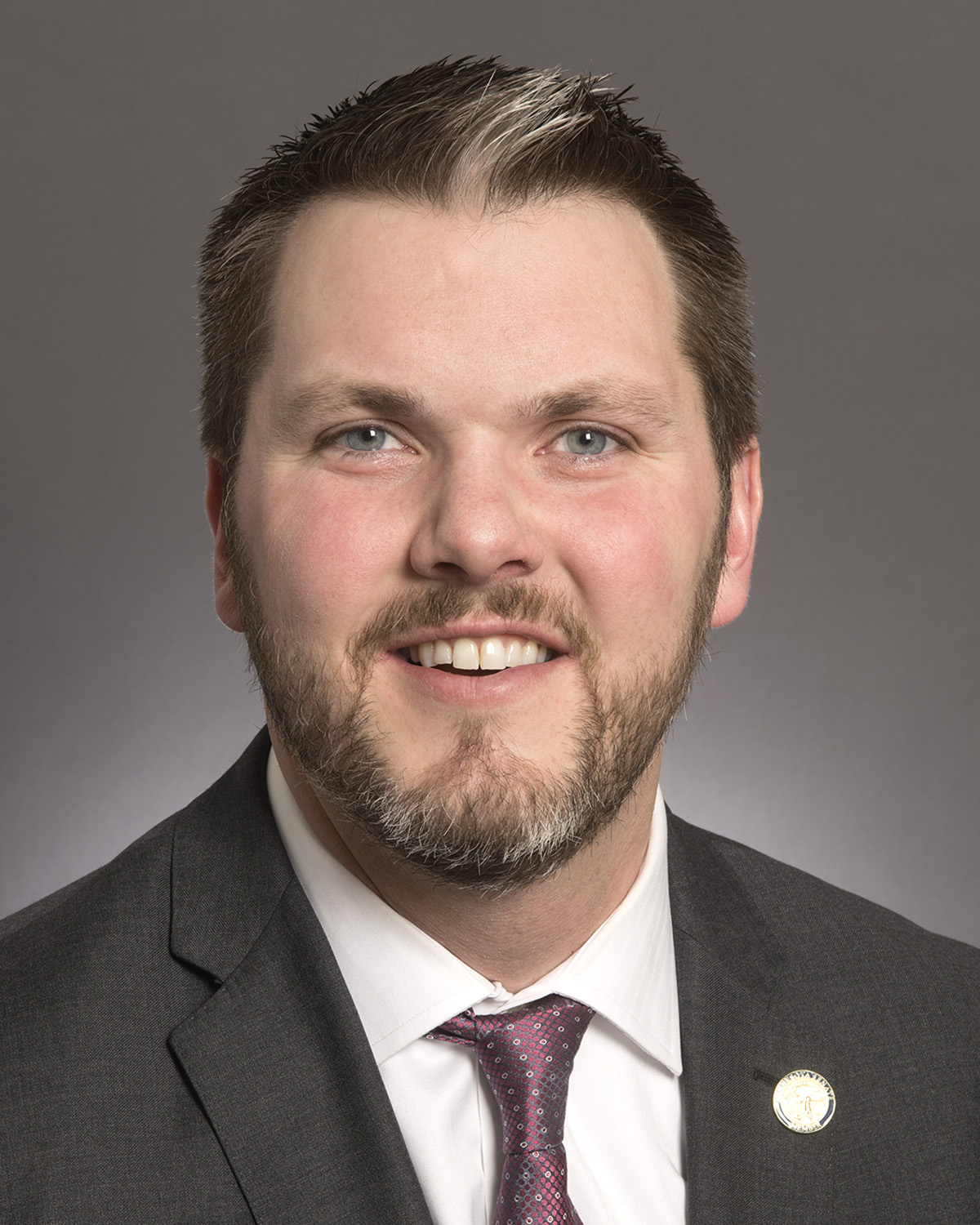
	Majority party	Minority party
Leader	Erin Murphy	Mark Johnson
Party	Democratic (DFL)	Republican
Leader since	February 6th, 2024	January 3rd, 2023
Leader's seat	64th–St. Paul	1st–East Grand Forks
Last election	34 seats, 50.70%	33 seats, 48.27%
Seats before	34	33
Seats after	39	28
Seat change	▲5	▼5
- Results: DFL hold DFL gain Republican hold Republican gain Result TBD
Majority Leader before election
Erin Murphy
Democratic (DFL)
Elected Majority Leader
TBD

The 2026 Minnesota Senate election took place on November 3, 2026. All 67 districts in the Minnesota Senate were up for election to a four-year term. Primary elections were held on August 11, 2026. The Minnesota Democratic-Farmer-Labor Party (DFL) retained control of the Senate, winning at least 39 of the 67 seats. Two races were close enough for a state-funded recount, given that the losing parties request them.

Prior to the election, 34 seats were held by DFLers and 33 seats were held by Republicans. The election coincided with the election of the State House of Representatives as well as various federal, state, and local elections.

== Background ==
The last election in 2022 resulted in the Minnesota Democratic-Farmer-Labor Party attaining a majority in the chamber for the first time since 2012, gaining the DFL a trifecta from 2023 until 2025. As Minnesota Senate seats follow a 2,4,4 term length schedule, there was no regularly scheduled Minnesota Senate election in 2024.

== Outgoing members ==
=== Retiring ===
Map of the incumbents: DFL incumbent DFL incumbent retiring Republican incumbent Republican incumbent retiring

- Jim Carlson (DFL–Eagan), representing district 52 since 2023, (Note: Previously elected to the 38th district in 2006, defeated for re-election in 2010, and elected to the 51st district in 2012) is retiring.
- Steve Cwodzinski (DFL–Eden Prairie), representing district 49 since 2017, is retiring.
- Gary Dahms (R–Redwood Falls), representing district 15 since 2011, is retiring.
- Rich Draheim (R–Madison Lake), representing district 22 since 2023, (Note: Previously elected to the 20th district in 2016 and 2020) is retiring.
- Steve Drazkowski (R–Mazeppa), representing district 20 since 2023 is retiring.
- Jeff Howe (R–Rockville), representing district 13 since 2019, is retiring.
- Warren Limmer (R–Maple Grove), representing district 37 since 2022, (Note: Previously elected to the 33rd district in 1995, 1996, and 2000, elected to the 32nd district in 2002, 2006, and 2010, and elected to the 34th district in 2012, 2016, and 2020) is retiring.
- Alice Mann (DFL–Edina), representing district 50 since 2023, is retiring.
- Jeremy Miller (R–Winona), representing district 26 since 2023, (Note: Previously elected to the 31st district in 2010 and the 28th district in 2012) is retiring.
- Carla Nelson (R–Rochester), representing district 24 since 2023, (Note: Previously elected to the 30th district in 2010, and elected to the 30th district in 2012, 2016, and 2020) is retiring.
- Sandy Pappas (DFL–St. Paul), representing district 65 since 1991, is retiring.
- Ann Rest (DFL–New Hope), representing district 43 since 2023, (Note: Previously elected to the 46th district in 2000 and the 45th district in 2012) is retiring.
- Bill Weber (R–Luverne), representing district 21 since 2023, (Note: Previously elected to the 22nd district in 2012, 2016, and 2020) is retiring.
- Melissa Wiklund (DFL–Bloomington), representing district 51 since 2023, (Note: Previously elected to the 50th district in 2012) is retiring.
- Tou Xiong (DFL–Maplewood), representing district 44 since 2023, is retiring.

=== Lost renomination ===
- Paul Utke (R–Park Rapids), representing district 5 since 2022, (Note: Previously elected to the 2nd district in 2016, and 2020.) lost renomination to district 5B representative Mike Wiener.

=== Seeking other office ===
- Matt Klein (DFL–Mendota Heights), representing district 53 since 2023, (Note: Previously elected to the 52nd district in 2016, and 2020.) is running for district 2 of the U.S. House of Representatives.
- Eric Pratt (R–Prior Lake), representing district 54 since 2023, (Note: Previously elected to the 55th district in 2012, 2016, and 2020.) is running for district 2 of the U.S. House of Representatives.

== Primary election results ==
A primary election was held on August 11, 2026 in 15 districts to nominate Republican and DFL candidates. Six Republican nominations and 10 DFL nominations were contested, with six incumbents challenged for their party's nomination.

District	Party	Candidates	Votes	%
5	Republican	Mike Wiener	5,803	50.84
5	Republican	Paul Utke (inc)	5,611	49.16
10	Republican	Nathan Wesenberg (inc)	9,069	74.21
10	Republican	Deb Holthaus	3,152	25.97
13	Republican	Jared J. Gapinski	6,449	65.87
13	Republican	Aaron Brutger	3,341	34.13
19	Republican	John R. Jasinski (inc)	6,088	88.22
19	Republican	Crystal Alan	813	11.78
19	DFL	Sam Powell	3,856	79.24
19	DFL	Adama Youhn Doumbouya	1,010	20.76
20	Republican	Steven E. Jacob	6,586	83.43
20	Republican	Theodore "Teddy" Kimble	1,308	16.57
23	DFL	Angie Hanson	4,667	86.55
23	DFL	Jennifer Ney	725	13.45
29	DFL	Louis McNutt	2,967	58.56
29	DFL	Dan Fiskum	2,100	41.44
37	DFL	Kristy Janigo	8,468	84.17
37	DFL	Austin Chanen	1,593	15.83
38	DFL	Susan Pha (inc)	5,623	74.89
38	DFL	Nehemiah Garley	1,885	25.11
44	DFL	Sam Rosemark	4,596	51.90
44	DFL	Teresa Miller	4,260	48.10
46	DFL	Ron Latz (inc)	10,876	59.77
46	DFL	Lynette Lungay Dumalag	7,321	40.23
50	DFL	Karla Hult	9,472	58.88
50	DFL	Nelly Korman	3,467	21.55
50	DFL	John McClellan	2,103	13.07
50	DFL	Amal Ibrahim	1,046	6.50
56	Republican	Raymond David Petersen	2,938	59.34
56	Republican	Julida Alter	2,013	40.66
62	DFL	Omar Fateh (inc)	12,827	78.29
62	DFL	Jeanelle Austin	2,355	14.37
62	DFL	Brenda Short	1,202	7.34
65	DFL	Robyn Gulley	7,652	70.69
65	DFL	Natasha Bennett	3,173	29.31
Source: Minnesota Secretary of State

== Predictions ==
Source	Ranking	As of
Sabato's Crystal Ball	Tossup	January 22, 2026
State Navigate	Safe D	January 22, 2026

== Fundraising ==
Campaign finance reports as of December 31, 2025 (Note: per the January 1 – December 31 Year-End Report)
Committee	Raised	Spent	Cash on hand
Senate Victory Fund (R)	$1,571,172	$681,307	$2,375,563
DFL Senate Caucus	$2,071,357	$1,346,046	$2,889,445
Source: Minnesota Campaign Finance Board

== Results ==
=== Summary of results ===
Party	Candidates	Votes		
Party	Candidates	No.	%	+/−
Minnesota Democratic–Farmer–Labor Party	67	1,551,222	55.78	+5.08
Republican Party of Minnesota	63	1,219,481	43.85	-4.42
Independent	1	2,003	0.07	+0.06
Green Party	1	1,023	0.04	+0.04
Forward Independence Party	1	996	0.04	+0.04
United New Independence	1	649	0.02	+0.02
Write-in	—N/a	5,591	0.20	-0.27
Total		2,780,965	100	
Source: Minnesota Secretary of State

=== Close races ===
Districts where the margin of victory was under 10%:

1. District 4*, 0.01% (gain)
2. District 33*, 0.08%
3. District 54, 1.15% (gain)
4. District 58, 1.47% (gain)
5. District 24, 1.64% (gain)
6. District 48, 1.99%
7. District 26, 2.8%
8. District 41, 4.85%
9. District 32, 6.22% (gain)
10. District 35, 7.63% (gain)
11. District 57, 8.08%
12. District 37, 8.11% (gain)
13. District 3, 8.77%
14. District 7, 8.88%
15. District 2, 9.91%

=== District results ===
District	Incumbent			Candidates				Winner party
District	Name	Party	First elected	Name	Party	Votes	%	Winner party
1	Mark Johnson	Republican	2016	Mark Johnson	Republican	24,014	68.01%	Republican
1	Mark Johnson	Republican	2016	Bjorn Solberg	DFL	11,278	31.94%	Republican
2	Steve Green	Republican	2022	Steve Green	Republican	20,443	54.09%	Republican
2	Steve Green	Republican	2022	Dan R. Rogers	DFL	16,692	44.16%	Republican
2	Steve Green	Republican	2022	Calvin Larson Jr	UNI (Note: Listed as United New Independence on the ballot)	649	1.72%	Republican
3	Grant Hauschild	DFL	2022	Grant Hauschild	DFL	24,883	54.30%	DFL
3	Grant Hauschild	DFL	2022	Andrea Zupancich	Republican	20,866	45.54%	DFL
4	Rob Kupec	DFL	2022	Austin Peterson*	Republican	18,107	49.95%	Republican
4	Rob Kupec	DFL	2022	Rob Kupec	DFL	18,103	49.94%	Republican
5	Paul Utke	Republican	2016	Mike Wiener	Republican	30,380	71.19%	Republican
5	Paul Utke	Republican	2016	Skylar Fynboh	DFL	12,197	28.58%	Republican
6	Keri Heintzeman	Republican	2025	Keri Heintzeman	Republican	27,503	62.02%	Republican
6	Keri Heintzeman	Republican	2025	Denise Slipy	DFL	16,799	37.89%	Republican
7	Robert Farnsworth	Republican	2022	Robert Farnsworth	Republican	21,773	54.41%	Republican
7	Robert Farnsworth	Republican	2022	Kim McLaughlin	DFL	18,222	45.53%	Republican
8	Jen McEwen	DFL	2020	Jen McEwen	DFL	31,668	76.03%	DFL
8	Jen McEwen	DFL	2020	Darrick Law	Republican	9,951	23.89%	DFL
9	Jordan Rasmusson	Republican	2022	Jordan Rasmusson	Republican	30,083	69.59%	Republican
9	Jordan Rasmusson	Republican	2022	Krystyne Knutson	DFL	13,113	30.34%	Republican
10	Nathan Wesenberg	Republican	2022	Nathan Wesenberg	Republican	30,655	72.46%	Republican
10	Nathan Wesenberg	Republican	2022	Tara Killen	DFL	11,593	27.40%	Republican
11	Jason Rarick	Republican	2019	Jason Rarick	Republican	22,240	55.33%	Republican
11	Jason Rarick	Republican	2019	Mary Carlson	DFL	16,937	42.13%	Republican
11	Jason Rarick	Republican	2019	Monique Doward	F-I (Note: Forward Independence Party)	996	2.48%	Republican
12	Torrey Westrom	Republican	2012	Torrey Westrom	Republican	28,960	69.29%	Republican
12	Torrey Westrom	Republican	2012	Kari Dorry	DFL	12,814	30.66%	Republican
13	Jeff Howe	Republican	2018	Jared Gapinski	Republican	28,814	66.84%	Republican
13	Jeff Howe	Republican	2018	Trent C Dilks	DFL	14,169	32.87%	Republican
14	Aric Putnam	DFL	2020	Aric Putnam	DFL	19,678	55.94%	DFL
14	Aric Putnam	DFL	2020	Bernie Perryman	Republican	15,448	43.92%	DFL
15	Gary Dahms	Republican	2010	Braxton Seifert	Republican	25,173	66.74%	Republican
15	Gary Dahms	Republican	2010	Andrea Boettger	DFL	12,517	33.19%	Republican
16	Andrew Lang	Republican	2016	Andrew Lang	Republican	24,919	66.99%	Republican
16	Andrew Lang	Republican	2016	Kathy Jorgenson	DFL	12,261	32.96%	Republican
17	Glenn Gruenhagen	Republican	2022	Glenn Gruenhagen	Republican	28,402	67.14%	Republican
17	Glenn Gruenhagen	Republican	2022	Julie Kelzer	DFL	13,859	32.76%	Republican
18	Nick Frentz	DFL	2016	Nick Frentz	DFL	22,003	59.38%	DFL
18	Nick Frentz	DFL	2016	Jackie Henry	Republican	15,021	40.54%	DFL
19	John Jasinski	Republican	2016	John Jasinski	Republican	22,608	60.19%	Republican
19	John Jasinski	Republican	2016	Sam Powell	DFL	14,924	39.73%	Republican
20	Steve Drazkowski	Republican	2022	Steven Jacob	Republican	24,874	57.40%	Republican
20	Steve Drazkowski	Republican	2022	Jason Lohmann	DFL	18,430	42.53%	Republican
21	Bill Weber	Republican	2012	Chris Knoll	Republican	23,002	67.10%	Republican
21	Bill Weber	Republican	2012	Caitlyn Sanow-Minett	DFL	11,257	32.84%	Republican
22	Rich Draheim	Republican	2016	Jeremy Munson	Republican	25,947	65.12%	Republican
22	Rich Draheim	Republican	2016	Marisa Ulmen	DFL	13,863	34.79%	Republican
23	Gene Dornink	Republican	2020	Gene Dornink	Republican	19,684	54.98%	Republican
23	Gene Dornink	Republican	2020	Angie Hanson	DFL	16,090	44.94%	Republican
24	Carla Nelson	Republican	2010	Simon Glaser	DFL	21,082	50.77%	DFL
24	Carla Nelson	Republican	2010	Nels Pierson	Republican	20,403	49.13%	DFL
25	Liz Boldon	DFL	2022	Liz Boldon	DFL	26,126	66.01%	DFL
25	Liz Boldon	DFL	2022	John Howie	Republican	13,418	33.90%	DFL
26	Jeremy Miller	Republican	2010	Cherie Johnson	Republican	20,629	51.36%	Republican
26	Jeremy Miller	Republican	2010	Jack Hedin	DFL	19,509	48.57%	Republican
27	Andrew Mathews	Republican	2016	Andrew Mathews	Republican	28,596	69.35%	Republican
27	Andrew Mathews	Republican	2016	Brandon Van Dover	DFL	12,619	30.60%	Republican
28	Mark Koran	Republican	2016	Mark Koran	Republican	28,084	64.84%	Republican
28	Mark Koran	Republican	2016	Max Glenna	DFL	15,149	34.98%	Republican
29	Michael Holmstrom Jr.	Republican	2025	Michael Holmstrom Jr.	Republican	27,444	63.38%	Republican
29	Michael Holmstrom Jr.	Republican	2025	Louis McNutt	DFL	15,836	36.57%	Republican
30	Eric Lucero	Republican	2022	Eric Lucero	Republican	28,534	60.33%	Republican
30	Eric Lucero	Republican	2022	Leah Temple	DFL	18,743	39.63%	Republican
31	Cal Bahr	Republican	2022	Cal Bahr	Republican	27,808	61.12%	Republican
31	Cal Bahr	Republican	2022	Gadisa Berkessa	DFL	17,640	38.77%	Republican
32	Michael Kreun	Republican	2022	Chris Ford	DFL	23,761	53.07%	DFL
32	Michael Kreun	Republican	2022	Michael Kreun	Republican	20,978	46.85%	DFL
33	Karin Housley	Republican	2012	Karin Housley*	Republican	23,977	50.00%	Republican
33	Karin Housley	Republican	2012	Nat Smith	DFL	23,935	49.92%	Republican
34	John Hoffman	DFL	2012	John Hoffman	DFL	29,217	62.22%	DFL
34	John Hoffman	DFL	2012	Karen Attia	Republican	17,704	37.70%	DFL
35	Jim Abeler	Republican	2016	Angela Nelson	DFL	21,268	53.75%	DFL
35	Jim Abeler	Republican	2016	Jim Abeler	Republican	18,248	46.12%	DFL
36	Heather Gustafson	DFL	2022	Heather Gustafson	DFL	27,492	57.01%	DFL
36	Heather Gustafson	DFL	2022	Heidi Heino	Republican	20,698	42.92%	DFL
37	Warren Limmer	Republican	1995	Kristy Janigo	DFL	27,849	54.00%	DFL
37	Warren Limmer	Republican	1995	Brady Hoag	Republican	23,667	45.89%	DFL
38	Susan Pha	DFL	2022	Susan Pha	DFL	21,015	76.16%	DFL
38	Susan Pha	DFL	2022	Brad Olson	Republican	6,511	23.60%	DFL
39	Mary Kunesh	DFL	2020	Mary Kunesh	DFL	26,141	70.76%	DFL
39	Mary Kunesh	DFL	2020	Pam Wolf	Republican	9,757	26.41%	DFL
39	Mary Kunesh	DFL	2020	Ngone Saliou Niang	Green	1,023	2.77%	DFL
40	John Marty	DFL	1986	John Marty	DFL	31,233	68.84%	DFL
40	John Marty	DFL	1986	Rachel Japuntich	Republican	14,092	31.06%	DFL
41	Judy Seeberger	DFL	2022	Judy Seeberger	DFL	25,547	52.38%	DFL
41	Judy Seeberger	DFL	2022	Tom Dippel	Republican	23,184	47.53%	DFL
42	Bonnie Westlin	DFL	2022	Bonnie Westlin	DFL	28,366	63.39%	DFL
42	Bonnie Westlin	DFL	2022	Kevin Peterson	Republican	16,343	36.52%	DFL
43	Ann Rest	DFL	2000	Mike Freiberg	DFL	34,034	97.21%	DFL
44	Tou Xiong	DFL	2022	Sam Rosemark	DFL	24,793	66.15%	DFL
44	Tou Xiong	DFL	2022	James Tacheny	Republican	12,603	33.63%	DFL
45	Ann Johnson Stewart	DFL	2024	Ann Johnson Stewart	DFL	29,279	57.00%	DFL
45	Ann Johnson Stewart	DFL	2024	Shannon Bruce	Republican	22,059	42.94%	DFL
46	Ron Latz	DFL	2006	Ron Latz	DFL	35,832	77.10%	DFL
46	Ron Latz	DFL	2006	Kayla Wright	Republican	10,522	22.64%	DFL
47	Amanda Hemmingsen-Jaeger	DFL	2025	Amanda Hemmingsen-Jaeger	DFL	29,076	63.99%	DFL
47	Amanda Hemmingsen-Jaeger	DFL	2025	Brian Stalboerger	Republican	16,330	35.94%	DFL
48	Julia Coleman	Republican	2020	Julia Coleman	Republican	25,122	50.96%	Republican
48	Julia Coleman	Republican	2020	Dan Kessler	DFL	24,141	48.97%	Republican
49	Steve Cwodzinski	DFL	2016	Krish Subrahmanian	DFL	29,406	62.63%	DFL
49	Steve Cwodzinski	DFL	2016	Dustin R. DuFault	Republican	15,528	33.07%	DFL
49	Steve Cwodzinski	DFL	2016	Kris Babler	Independent	2,003	4.27%	DFL
50	Alice Mann	DFL	2022	Karla Hult	DFL	33,770	68.92%	DFL
50	Alice Mann	DFL	2022	Owen Michaelson	Republican	15,185	30.99%	DFL
51	Melissa Halvorson Wiklund	DFL	2012	Simon Trautmann Cordova	DFL	29,588	74.19%	DFL
51	Melissa Halvorson Wiklund	DFL	2012	Juline Birgersson	Republican	10,220	25.62%	DFL
52	Jim Carlson	DFL	2012	Liz Reyer	DFL	30,349	67.13%	DFL
52	Jim Carlson	DFL	2012	Brady O'Neil	Republican	14,837	32.82%	DFL
53	Matt Klein	DFL	2016	Paul Cumings	DFL	26,272	61.78%	DFL
53	Matt Klein	DFL	2016	Todd Podgorski	Republican	16,219	38.14%	DFL
54	Eric Pratt	Republican	2012	Rick Olson	DFL	22,360	50.53%	DFL
54	Eric Pratt	Republican	2012	Ben Bakeberg	Republican	21,848	49.38%	DFL
55	Lindsey Port	DFL	2020	Lindsey Port	DFL	24,856	62.46%	DFL
55	Lindsey Port	DFL	2020	Van Holston	Republican	14,910	37.47%	DFL
56	Erin Maye Quade	DFL	2022	Erin Maye Quade	DFL	28,435	62.93%	DFL
56	Erin Maye Quade	DFL	2022	Raymond David Petersen	Republican	16,709	36.98%	DFL
57	Zach Duckworth	Republican	2020	Zach Duckworth	Republican	26,262	54.02%	Republican
57	Zach Duckworth	Republican	2020	Steven Schroer	DFL	22,325	45.92%	Republican
58	Bill Lieske	Republican	2022	Mark Legvold	DFL	22,889	50.70%	DFL
58	Bill Lieske	Republican	2022	Bill Lieske	Republican	22,226	49.23%	DFL
59	Bobby Joe Champion	DFL	2012	Bobby Joe Champion	DFL	28,994	98.36%	DFL
60	Doron Clark	DFL	2025	Doron Clark	DFL	33,261	90.24%	DFL
60	Doron Clark	DFL	2025	Abigail Wolters	Republican	3,550	9.63%	DFL
61	Scott Dibble	DFL	2002	Scott Dibble	DFL	43,594	98.90%	DFL
62	Omar Fateh	DFL	2020	Omar Fateh	DFL	29,733	97.30%	DFL
63	Zaynab Mohamed	DFL	2022	Zaynab Mohamed	DFL	44,769	87.92%	DFL
63	Zaynab Mohamed	DFL	2022	Diane Napper	Republican	6,023	11.83%	DFL
64	Erin Murphy	DFL	2020	Erin Murphy	DFL	41,957	86.77%	DFL
64	Erin Murphy	DFL	2020	Robert Bushard	Republican	6,339	13.11%	DFL
65	Sandy Pappas	DFL	1990	Robyn Gulley	DFL	26,470	85.61%	DFL
65	Sandy Pappas	DFL	1990	Rocco	Republican	4,303	13.92%	DFL
66	Clare Oumou Verbeten	DFL	2022	Clare Oumou Verbeten	DFL	29,868	84.68%	DFL
66	Clare Oumou Verbeten	DFL	2022	Kathleen Bart	Republican	5,342	15.14%	DFL
67	Foung Hawj	DFL	2012	Foung Hawj	DFL	19,293	81.27%	DFL
67	Foung Hawj	DFL	2012	Toby Hesselgrave	Republican	4,402	18.54%	DFL
*Races where the margin is under 0.5% fall within Minnesota's threshold for a state-funded recount. Source: Minnesota Secretary of State
