= 2022 Minnesota Senate election =

- November 8, 2022

All 67 seats in the Minnesota Senate 34 seats needed for a majority
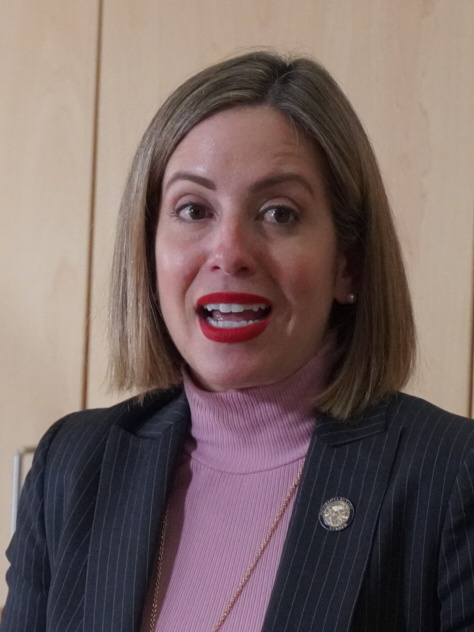

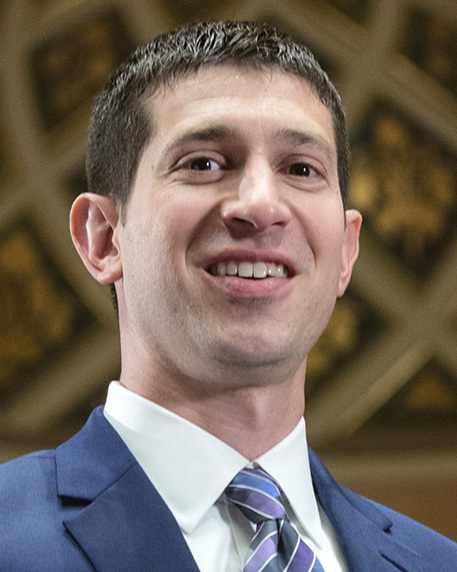
	Majority party	Minority party
Leader	Melisa López Franzen (retired)	Jeremy Miller
Party	Democratic (DFL)	Republican
Leader since	September 14, 2021	September 9, 2021
Leader's seat	49th-Edina	28th-Winona
Last election	33 seats, 49.82%	34 seats, 48.39%
Seats before	31	34
Seats after	34	33
Seat change	▲3	▼1
popular vote	1,239,682	1,180,254
Percentage	50.70%	48.27%
Swing	▲0.88 pp	▼1.55 pp
	Third party
Party	Independent
Last election	N/A
Seats before	2
Seats won	0
Seat change	▼2
popular vote	1,485
Percentage	0.01%
Swing	▲0.01 pp
Majority Leader before election
Jeremy Miller
Republican
Elected Majority Leader
Kari Dziedzic
Democratic (DFL)

The 2022 Minnesota Senate election was held in the U.S. state of Minnesota on November 8, 2022, to elect members of the Senate of the 93rd Minnesota Legislature. A primary election was held in several districts on August 9, 2022. The election coincided with the election of the other house of the Legislature, the Minnesota House of Representatives, and all other statewide elections.

Democrats (DFL) gained two seats, giving them a majority of 34 out of 67 seats and winning control of the chamber for the first time since 2012. Simultaneously with Democrats retaining control of the state house, and Governor Tim Walz winning re-election, the DFL won a trifecta in the state for the first time since 2012.

== Background ==
The last election in 2020 resulted in the Republican Party of Minnesota retaining a majority of seats, after winning a majority from the Minnesota Democratic–Farmer–Labor Party (DFL) only four years earlier in the previous election in 2016. Control of the Senate had alternated between the Republicans and the DFL in every election since 2010. All-Republican control of the Legislature ended when the DFL won a majority in the House in 2018.

=== Electoral system ===
The 67 members of the Senate were elected from single-member districts via first-past-the-post voting for four-year terms. Contested nominations of recognized major parties (DFL, Grassroots–Legalize Cannabis, Legal Marijuana Now, and Republican) for each district were determined by an open primary election. Minor party candidates were to be nominated by petition. Write-in candidates had to file a request with the Secretary of State's office for votes for them to be counted. Candidates for the state Senate in 2022 were required to file to run between May 17, 2022, and May 31, 2022.

=== Reapportionment ===
Due to the 2020 United States Census, the law required redistricting to occur before February 15, 2022, in order to give candidates ample notice before the legislative filing window in late May. Historically, the legislature has often been unable to agree on redistricting, leading to a court decision on the issue.

In August 2021, hearings began in both the House and Senate Redistricting Committee, with the Senate committee members having their first meeting in Bemidji on August 9, and the House committee members having their first meeting on August 18.

A legal challenge was filed against the congressional and legislative maps, predicting that the state legislature would not draw valid maps and would malapportion the districts.

On March 22, 2021, the Minnesota Supreme Court appointed a special redistricting panel, but issued a stay on its proceedings; on June 30, the Supreme Court appointed judges to the panel and allowed it to proceed with its appointed business.

On February 15, 2022, after the Minnesota Legislature missed the redistricting deadline, the special redistricting panel released its own congressional and legislative maps.

== Retiring members ==
Retiring incumbents by district (boundaries from 2020 election) Democratic-Farmer-Labor incumbent ran Democratic-Farmer-Labor incumbent retired Republican incumbent ran Republican incumbent retired Independent incumbent retired Vacant

=== Republican ===
- Bill Ingebrigsten, 8th
- Paul Gazelka, 9th
- Carrie Ruud, 10th
- Scott Newman, 18th
- Mike Goggin, 21st
- Julie Rosen, 23rd
- Dave Senjem, 25th
- Mary Kiffmeyer, 30th
- Michelle Benson, 31st
- David Osmek, 33rd

=== DFL ===
- Kent Eken, 4th
- Jerry Newton, 37th
- Chris Eaton, 40th
- Chuck Wiger, 43rd
- Ann Johnson Stewart, 44th
- Melisa Lopez Franzen, 49th
- Susan Kent, 53rd
- Karla Bigham, 54th
- Greg Clausen, 57th
- Patricia Torres Ray, 63rd

=== Independent ===
- Tom Bakk, 3rd
- David Tomassoni, 6th (died before election)

== Predictions ==
Source	Ranking	As of
Sabato's Crystal Ball	Lean R	May 19, 2022
CNalysis	Tilt R	September 12, 2022

== Results ==
Districts won

Party	Candidates	Votes			Seats		
Party	Candidates	No.	%	+/−	No.	+/−	%
Minnesota Democratic–Farmer–Labor Party	63	1,239,682	50.70	+0.88	34	+3	50.75
Republican Party of Minnesota	61	1,180,254	48.27	–1.55	33	–1	49.25
Legal Marijuana Now Party	3	10,348	0.42	–0.52	0	±0	0.00
Independent	1	1,485	0.01	N/A	0	–2	0.00
Libertarian Party	1	1,061	0.01	N/A	0	±0	0.00
Grassroots–Legalize Cannabis Party	1	669	0.01	–0.54	0	±0	0.00
Write-in	N/A	11,550	0.47	+0.35	0	±0	0.00
Total		2,445,079	100		67	±0	100
Invalid/blank votes							
Total			100.00				
Registered voters/turnout							
Source: Minnesota Secretary of State

=== Close races ===
Districts where the margin of victory was under 10%:

1. District 35, 0.54%
2. District 41, 0.75%
3. District 3, 1.62% (gain)
4. District 14, 4.70%
5. District 33, 5.64%
6. District 58, 5.68%
7. District 36, 5.68% (gain)
8. District 4, 5.69%
9. District 32, 5.98%
10. District 7, 6.99% (gain)
11. District 48, 8.72%
12. District 34, 9.82%
13. District 37, 9.84%

=== District results ===
Source: Minnesota Secretary of State

==== District 1 ====
2022 Minnesota Senate district 1 Republican primary
Party	Candidate	Votes	%
Republican	Mark Johnson (incumbent)	6,363	85.82
Republican	Dave Hughes	1,051	14.18
Total votes		7,414	100%

2022 Minnesota Senate district 1 election
Party	Candidate	Votes	%
Republican	Mark Johnson (incumbent)	27,320	97.05
Write-in		830	2.95
Total votes		28,150	100%

==== District 2 ====
2022 Minnesota Senate district 2 election
Party	Candidate	Votes	%
Republican	Steve Green	20,397	59.96
Democratic (DFL)	Alan Roy	13,589	39.95
Write-in		31	0.09
Total votes		34,017	100%

==== District 3 ====
2022 Minnesota Senate district 3 Republican primary
Party	Candidate	Votes	%
Republican	Andrea Zupancich	5,762	69.06
Republican	Kelsey Johnson	2,581	30.94
Total votes		8,343	100%

2022 Minnesota Senate district 3 election
Party	Candidate	Votes	%
Democratic (DFL)	Grant Hauschild	22,052	50.77
Republican	Andrea Zupancich	21,349	49.15
Write-in		38	0.09
Total votes		43,439	100%

==== District 4 ====
2022 Minnesota Senate district 4 Republican primary
Party	Candidate	Votes	%
Republican	Dan Bohmer	2,421	72.53
Republican	Edwin Hahn	917	27.47
Total votes		3,338	100%

2022 Minnesota Senate district 4 election
Party	Candidate	Votes	%
Democratic (DFL)	Rob Kupec	15,929	52.49
Republican	Dan Bohmer	14,202	46.80
Write-in		214	0.71
Total votes		30,345	100%

==== District 5 ====
2022 Minnesota Senate district 5 Republican primary
Party	Candidate	Votes	%
Republican	Paul Utke (incumbent)	5,024	57.33
Republican	Bret Bussman	2,834	32.34
Republican	Dale Anderson	906	10.34
Total votes		8,764	100%

2022 Minnesota Senate district 5 election
Party	Candidate	Votes	%
Republican	Paul Utke (incumbent)	28,731	72.83
Democratic (DFL)	A. John Peters	10,687	27.09
Write-in		32	0.08
Total votes		39,450	100%

==== District 6 ====
2022 Minnesota Senate district 6 election
Party	Candidate	Votes	%
Republican	Justin Eichorn (incumbent)	26,218	63.50
Democratic (DFL)	Steve Samuelson	15,045	36.44
Write-in		26	0.06
Total votes		41,289	100%

==== District 7 ====
2022 Minnesota Senate district 7 DFL primary
Party	Candidate	Votes	%
Democratic (DFL)	Ben DeNucci	4,003	50.26
Democratic (DFL)	Kim McLaughlin	3,962	49.74
Total votes		7,965	100%

2022 Minnesota Senate district 7 election
Party	Candidate	Votes	%
Republican	Rob Farnsworth	20,797	53.05
Democratic (DFL)	Ben DeNucci	18,056	46.06
Write-in		346	0.88
Total votes		39,199	100%

==== District 8 ====
2022 Minnesota Senate district 8 election
- November 8, 2022
Candidate	Jen McEwen	Alex Moe
Party	Democratic Party	Republican Party
popular vote	26,518	10,481
Percentage	71.53%	28.27%
- McEwen: 50–60% 60–70% 70–80% 80–90%

2022 Minnesota Senate district 8 election
Party	Candidate	Votes	%
Democratic (DFL)	Jen McEwen (incumbent)	26,518	71.53
Republican	Alex Moe	10,481	28.27
Write-in		76	0.20
Total votes		37,075	100%

==== District 9 ====
2022 Minnesota Senate district 9 Republican primary
Party	Candidate	Votes	%
Republican	Jordan Rasmusson	5,738	51.59
Republican	Nathan R. Miller	5,385	48.41
Total votes		11,123	100%

2022 Minnesota Senate district 9 election
Party	Candidate	Votes	%
Republican	Jordan Rasmusson	25,372	62.74
Democratic (DFL)	Cornel Walker	11,560	28.59
Write-in		3507	8.67
Total votes		40,439	100%

==== District 10 ====
2022 Minnesota Senate district 10 Republican primary
Party	Candidate	Votes	%
Republican	Nathan Wesenberg	3,730	36.81
Republican	Steve Wenzel	3,290	32.46
Republican	Jim Newberger	3,114	30.73
Total votes		10,134	100%

2022 Minnesota Senate district 10 election
Party	Candidate	Votes	%
Republican	Nathan Wesenberg	28,395	72.41
Democratic (DFL)	Suzanne Cekalla	10,719	27.33
Write-in		102	0.26
Total votes		39,216	100%

==== District 11 ====
2022 Minnesota Senate district 11 DFL primary
Party	Candidate	Votes	%
Democratic (DFL)	Michelle Boyechko	2,218	61.65
Democratic (DFL)	John Peura	1,380	38.35
Total votes		3,598	100%

2022 Minnesota Senate district 11 election
Party	Candidate	Votes	%
Republican	Jason Rarick (incumbent)	22,111	60.89
Democratic (DFL)	Michelle Boyechko	14,152	38.97
Write-in		48	0.13
Total votes		36,311	100%

==== District 12 ====
2022 Minnesota Senate district 12 election
Party	Candidate	Votes	%
Republican	Torrey Westrom (incumbent)	26,178	68.01
Democratic (DFL)	Kari Dorry	10,813	28.09
Independent	Ashley Klingbeil	1,485	3.86
Write-in		16	0.04
Total votes		38,492	100%

==== District 13 ====
2022 Minnesota Senate district 13 Republican primary
Party	Candidate	Votes	%
Republican	Jeff Howe (incumbent)	6,739	85.59
Republican	Ashley Burg	1,135	14.41
Total votes		7,874	100%

2022 Minnesota Senate district 13 election
Party	Candidate	Votes	%
Republican	Jeff Howe (incumbent)	27,295	70.03
Democratic (DFL)	Alissa Brickman	11,647	29.88
Write-in		36	0.09
Total votes		38,978	100%

==== District 14 ====
2022 Minnesota Senate district 14 election
Party	Candidate	Votes	%
Democratic (DFL)	Aric Putnam (incumbent)	15,350	52.29
Republican	Tama Theis	13,969	47.58
Write-in		37	0.13
Total votes		29,356	100%

==== District 15 ====
2022 Minnesota Senate district 15 Republican primary
Party	Candidate	Votes	%
Republican	Gary Dahms (incumbent)	7,655	92.21
Republican	Larvita McFarquhar	647	7.79
Total votes		8,302	100%

2022 Minnesota Senate district 15 election
Party	Candidate	Votes	%
Republican	Gary Dahms (incumbent)	25,780	71.18
Democratic (DFL)	Anita Gaul	10,417	28.76
Write-in		20	0.06
Total votes		36,217	100%

==== District 16 ====
2022 Minnesota Senate district 16 election
Party	Candidate	Votes	%
Republican	Andrew Lang (incumbent)	24,596	69.66
Democratic (DFL)	Fernando Alvarado	10,690	30.28
Write-in		22	0.06
Total votes		35,308	100%

==== District 17 ====
2022 Minnesota Senate district 17 election
Party	Candidate	Votes	%
Republican	Glenn Gruenhagen	27,810	70.17
Democratic (DFL)	Chad Tschimperle	11,797	29.77
Write-in		24	0.06
Total votes		39,631	100%

==== District 18 ====
2022 Minnesota Senate district 18 election
Party	Candidate	Votes	%
Democratic (DFL)	Nick Frentz (incumbent)	19,136	57.78
Republican	Mark Wright	13,944	42.10
Write-in		39	0.12
Total votes		33,119	100%

==== District 19 ====
2022 Minnesota Senate district 19 election
Party	Candidate	Votes	%
Republican	John Jasinski (incumbent)	22,450	65.29
Democratic (DFL)	Kate Falvey	11,908	34.63
Write-in		26	0.08
Total votes		34,384	100%

==== District 20 ====
2022 Minnesota Senate district 20 election
Party	Candidate	Votes	%
Republican	Steve Drazkowski	25,129	61.67
Democratic (DFL)	Brad Drenckhahn	15,546	38.15
Write-in		70	0.17
Total votes		40,745	100%

==== District 21 ====
2022 Minnesota Senate district 15 Republican primary
Party	Candidate	Votes	%
Republican	Bill Weber (incumbent)	5,508	77.33
Republican	Brad Hutchison	1,615	22.67
Total votes		7,123	100%

2022 Minnesota Senate district 21 election
Party	Candidate	Votes	%
Republican	Bill Weber (incumbent)	27,829	97.80
Write-in		625	2.20
Total votes		28,454	100%

==== District 22 ====
2022 Minnesota Senate district 22 election
Party	Candidate	Votes	%
Republican	Rich Draheim (incumbent)	29,799	96.87
Write-in		962	3.13
Total votes		30,761	100%

==== District 23 ====
2022 Minnesota Senate district 23 Republican primary
Party	Candidate	Votes	%
Republican	Gene Dornink (incumbent)	5,874	71.49
Republican	Lisa Hanson	2,342	28.51
Total votes		8,216	100%

2022 Minnesota Senate district 23 election
Party	Candidate	Votes	%
Republican	Gene Dornink (incumbent)	20,273	60.71
Democratic (DFL)	Brandon Lawhead	13,051	39.09
Write-in		67	0.20
Total votes		33,391	100%

==== District 24 ====
2022 Minnesota Senate district 24 election
Party	Candidate	Votes	%
Republican	Carla Nelson (incumbent)	20,991	57.45
Democratic (DFL)	Aleta Borrud	15,529	42.50
Write-in		19	0.05
Total votes		36,539	100%

==== District 25 ====
2022 Minnesota Senate district 25 election
Party	Candidate	Votes	%
Democratic (DFL)	Liz Boldon	19,673	58.49
Republican	Ken Navitsky	13,251	39.40
Grassroots—LC	Bill Rood	699	2.08
Write-in		10	0.03
Total votes		33,633	100%

==== District 26 ====
2022 Minnesota Senate district 26 election
Party	Candidate	Votes	%
Republican	Jeremy Miller (incumbent)	21,444	58.28
Democratic (DFL)	Daniel Wilson	14,280	38.81
Legal Marijuana Now	Eric M. Leitzen	1,060	2.88
Write-in		9	0.02
Total votes		36,793	100%

==== District 27 ====
2022 Minnesota Senate district 27 election
Party	Candidate	Votes	%
Republican	Andrew Mathews (incumbent)	26,479	71.77
Democratic (DFL)	Aleta Emy Minzel	10,397	28.18
Write-in		16	0.04
Total votes		36,892	100%

==== District 28 ====
2022 Minnesota Senate district 28 election
Party	Candidate	Votes	%
Republican	Mark Koran (incumbent)	26,012	67.18
Democratic (DFL)	Victoria Ann Bird	12,670	32.72
Write-in		38	0.10
Total votes		38,720	100%

==== District 29 ====
2022 Minnesota Senate district 29 election
Party	Candidate	Votes	%
Republican	Bruce Anderson (incumbent)	26,505	68.04
Democratic (DFL)	Chris Brazelton	12,422	31.89
Write-in		28	0.07
Total votes		38,955	100%

==== District 30 ====
2022 Minnesota Senate district 30 election
Party	Candidate	Votes	%
Republican	Eric Lucero	26,146	65.18
Democratic (DFL)	Diane Nguyen	13,946	34.77
Write-in		20	0.05
Total votes		40,112	100%

==== District 31 ====
2022 Minnesota Senate district 31 Republican primary
Party	Candidate	Votes	%
Republican	Cal Bahr	3,935	78.57
Republican	Maribella McDermid	1,073	21.43
Total votes		5,008	100%

2022 Minnesota Senate district 31 election
Party	Candidate	Votes	%
Republican	Cal Bahr	25,705	63.75
Democratic (DFL)	Jason Ruffalo	14,585	36.17
Write-in		32	0.08
Total votes		40,322	100%

==== District 32 ====
2022 Minnesota Senate district 32 election
Party	Candidate	Votes	%
Republican	Michael Kreun	19,684	52.95
Democratic (DFL)	Kate Luthner	17,459	46.96
Write-in		34	0.09
Total votes		37,177	100%

==== District 33 ====
2022 Minnesota Senate district 33 DFL primary
Party	Candidate	Votes	%
Democratic (DFL)	Nancy McLean	4,635	90.99
Democratic (DFL)	Maribella McDermid	459	9.01
Total votes		5,094	100%

2022 Minnesota Senate district 33 election
Party	Candidate	Votes	%
Republican	Karin Housley (incumbent)	23,091	52.80
Democratic (DFL)	Nancy McLean	20,624	47.16
Write-in		17	0.04
Total votes		43,732	100%

==== District 34 ====
2022 Minnesota Senate district 34 election
Party	Candidate	Votes	%
Democratic (DFL)	John Hoffman (incumbent)	20,925	54.87
Republican	Karen Attia	17,181	45.05
Write-in		33	0.09
Total votes		38,139	100%

==== District 35 ====
2022 Minnesota Senate district 35 election
Party	Candidate	Votes	%
Republican	Jim Abeler (incumbent)	17,300	50.22
Democratic (DFL)	Kari Rehrauer	17,114	49.68
Write-in		34	0.10
Total votes		34,448	100%

==== District 36 ====
2022 Minnesota Senate district 36 election
Party	Candidate	Votes	%
Democratic (DFL)	Heather Gustafson	23,348	52.81
Republican	Roger Chamberlain (incumbent)	20,838	47.13
Write-in		26	0.06
Total votes		44,212	100%

==== District 37 ====
2022 Minnesota Senate district 37 election
Party	Candidate	Votes	%
Republican	Warren Limmer (incumbent)	24,463	54.88
Democratic (DFL)	Farhio Khalif	20,077	45.04
Write-in		34	0.08
Total votes		44,574	100%

==== District 38 ====
2022 Minnesota Senate district 38 DFL primary
Party	Candidate	Votes	%
Democratic (DFL)	Susan Pha	3,100	61.63
Democratic (DFL)	Huldah Hiltsley	1,930	38.37
Total votes		5,030	100%

2022 Minnesota Senate district 38 election
Party	Candidate	Votes	%
Democratic (DFL)	Susan Pha	14,116	63.91
Republican	Brad Kohler	6,337	28.69
Legal Marijuana Now	Mary O'Connor	1,602	7.25
Write-in		33	0.15
Total votes		22,088	100%

==== District 39 ====
2022 Minnesota Senate district 39 election
Party	Candidate	Votes	%
Democratic (DFL)	Mary Kunesh-Podein (incumbent)	20,563	66.49
Republican	Pam Wolf	10,327	33.39
Write-in		35	0.11
Total votes		30,925	100%

==== District 40 ====
2022 Minnesota Senate district 40 election
Party	Candidate	Votes	%
Democratic (DFL)	John Marty (incumbent)	26,490	64.76
Republican	Rachel Japuntich	14,371	35.13
Write-in		42	0.10
Total votes		40,903	100%

==== District 41 ====
2022 Minnesota Senate district 41 Republican primary
Party	Candidate	Votes	%
Republican	Tom Dippel	4,673	60.49
Republican	Tony Jurgens	2,995	39.06
Total votes		7,668	100%

2022 Minnesota Senate district 41 election
Party	Candidate	Votes	%
Democratic (DFL)	Judy Seeberger	21,536	50.33
Republican	Tom Dippel	21,215	49.58
Write-in		40	0.09
Total votes		42,791	100%

==== District 42 ====
2022 Minnesota Senate district 42 election
Party	Candidate	Votes	%
Democratic (DFL)	Bonnie Westlin	23,752	57.70
Republican	Paul Hillen	17,395	42.26
Write-in		19	0.05
Total votes		41,166	100%

==== District 43 ====
2022 Minnesota Senate district 43 election
Party	Candidate	Votes	%
Democratic (DFL)	Ann Rest (incumbent)	27,350	77.29
Legal Marijuana Now	Andrew Thomas Schuler	7,686	21.72
Write-in		352	0.99
Total votes		35,388	100%

==== District 44 ====
2022 Minnesota Senate district 44 DFL primary
Party	Candidate	Votes	%
Democratic (DFL)	Tou Xiong	2,634	47.62
Democratic (DFL)	Nancy Livingston	1,476	26.69
Democratic (DFL)	Leslie Lienemann	1,421	25.69
Total votes		5,531	100%

2022 Minnesota Senate district 44 election
Party	Candidate	Votes	%
Democratic (DFL)	Tou Xiong	19,173	59.54
Republican	Paul Babin	12,984	40.32
Write-in		43	0.13
Total votes		32,200	100%

==== District 45 ====
2022 Minnesota Senate district 45 election
Party	Candidate	Votes	%
Democratic (DFL)	Kelly Morrison	27,222	56.27
Republican	Kathleen Fowke	21,128	43.67
Write-in		26	0.05
Total votes		48,376	100%

==== District 46 ====
2022 Minnesota Senate district 46 election
Party	Candidate	Votes	%
Democratic (DFL)	Ron Latz	31,027	97.26
Write-in		874	2.74
Total votes		31,901	100%

==== District 47 ====
2022 Minnesota Senate district 47 election
Party	Candidate	Votes	%
Democratic (DFL)	Nicole Mitchell	22,936	58.71
Republican	Dwight Dorau	16,111	41.24
Write-in		17	0.04
Total votes		39,064	100%

==== District 48 ====
2022 Minnesota Senate district 48 DFL primary
Party	Candidate	Votes	%
Democratic (DFL)	Dan Kessler	3,054	90.14
Democratic (DFL)	Bala Chintaginjala	334	9.86
Total votes		3,388	100%

2022 Minnesota Senate district 48 election
Party	Candidate	Votes	%
Republican	Julia Coleman (incumbent)	23,306	54.34
Democratic (DFL)	Dan Kessler	19,564	45.61
Write-in		20	0.05
Total votes		42,890	100%

==== District 49 ====
2022 Minnesota Senate district 49 election
Party	Candidate	Votes	%
Democratic (DFL)	Steve Cwodzinski (incumbent)	26,448	62.28
Republican	Marla Helseth	15,998	37.67
Write-in		23	0.05
Total votes		42,469	100%

==== District 50 ====
2022 Minnesota Senate district 50 election
Party	Candidate	Votes	%
Democratic (DFL)	Alice Mann	28,575	63.42
Republican	Doug Fulton	16,457	36.53
Write-in		23	0.05
Total votes		45,055	100%

==== District 51 ====
2022 Minnesota Senate district 51 election
Party	Candidate	Votes	%
Democratic (DFL)	Melissa Wiklund (incumbent)	23,141	69.64
Republican	Frank Pafko	10,049	30.24
Write-in		38	0.11
Total votes		33,228	100%

==== District 52 ====
2022 Minnesota Senate district 52 election
Party	Candidate	Votes	%
Democratic (DFL)	Jim Carlson (incumbent)	26,004	63.22
Republican	Stephen Lowell	15,068	36.63
Write-in		61	0.15
Total votes		41,133	100%

==== District 53 ====
2022 Minnesota Senate district 53 election
Party	Candidate	Votes	%
Democratic (DFL)	Matt Klein (incumbent)	21,501	58.24
Republican	Chris Rausch	15,373	41.64
Write-in		42	0.11
Total votes		36,916	100%

==== District 54 ====
2022 Minnesota Senate district 54 Republican primary
Party	Candidate	Votes	%
Republican	Eric Pratt	3,447	53.70
Republican	Natalie Barnes	2,972	46.30
Total votes		6,419	100%

2022 Minnesota Senate district 54 election
Party	Candidate	Votes	%
Republican	Eric Pratt (incumbent)	20,632	56.59
Democratic (DFL)	Alicia Donahue	15,753	43.21
Write-in		75	0.21
Total votes		36,460	100%

==== District 55 ====
2022 Minnesota Senate district 55 election
Party	Candidate	Votes	%
Democratic (DFL)	Lindsey Port (incumbent)	18,996	55.30
Republican	Pam Myhra	15,316	44.59
Write-in		39	0.11
Total votes		34,351	100%

==== District 56 ====
2022 Minnesota Senate district 56 DFL primary
Party	Candidate	Votes	%
Democratic (DFL)	Erin Maye Quade	4,101	64.61
Democratic (DFL)	Justin Emmerich	2,246	35.39
Total votes		6,347	100%

2022 Minnesota Senate district 56 election
Party	Candidate	Votes	%
Democratic (DFL)	Erin Maye Quade	22,281	56.66
Republican	Jim Bean	17,007	43.25
Write-in		38	0.10
Total votes		39,326	100%

==== District 57 ====
2022 Minnesota Senate district 57 election
Party	Candidate	Votes	%
Republican	Zach Duckworth (incumbent)	24,258	58.61
Democratic (DFL)	Jackie Craig	17,106	41.33
Write-in		28	0.07
Total votes		41,392	100%

==== District 58 ====
2022 Minnesota Senate district 58 Republican primary
Party	Candidate	Votes	%
Republican	Bill Lieske	3,229	61.94
Republican	Jake Cordes	1,984	38.06
Total votes		5,213	100%

2022 Minnesota Senate district 58 election
Party	Candidate	Votes	%
Republican	Bill Lieske	21,125	52.79
Democratic (DFL)	Clarice Grabau	18,854	47.11
Write-in		38	0.09
Total votes		40,017	100%

==== District 59 ====
2022 Minnesota Senate district 59 election
Party	Candidate	Votes	%
Democratic (DFL)	Bobby Joe Champion (incumbent)	22,806	98.28
Write-in		399	1.72
Total votes		23,205	100%

==== District 60 ====
2022 Minnesota Senate district 60 election
Party	Candidate	Votes	%
Democratic (DFL)	Kari Dziedzic (incumbent)	26,484	98.66
Write-in		360	1.34
Total votes		26,844	100%

==== District 61 ====
2022 Minnesota Senate district 61 election
Party	Candidate	Votes	%
Democratic (DFL)	Scott Dibble (incumbent)	37,366	98.71
Write-in		487	1.29
Total votes		37,853	100%

==== District 62 ====
2022 Minnesota Senate district 62 DFL primary
Party	Candidate	Votes	%
Democratic (DFL)	Omar Fateh (incumbent)	7,416	60.65
Democratic (DFL)	Shaun Laden	4,811	39.35
Total votes		12,227	100%

2022 Minnesota Senate district 62 election
Party	Candidate	Votes	%
Democratic (DFL)	Omar Fateh (incumbent)	24,271	90.28
Republican	Andrew Schmitz	2,528	9.40
Write-in		84	0.31
Total votes		26,883	100%

==== District 63 ====
2022 Minnesota Senate district 63 DFL primary
Party	Candidate	Votes	%
Democratic (DFL)	Zaynab Mohamed	14,073	67.57
Democratic (DFL)	Todd Scott	6,754	32.43
Total votes		12,227	100%

2022 Minnesota Senate district 63 election
Party	Candidate	Votes	%
Democratic (DFL)	Zaynab Mohamed	39,063	85.63
Republican	Shawn Holster	6,449	14.14
Write-in		106	0.23
Total votes		45,618	100%

==== District 64 ====
2022 Minnesota Senate district 64 election
Party	Candidate	Votes	%
Democratic (DFL)	Erin Murphy (incumbent)	36,686	84.19
Republican	Robert Bushard	6,823	15.66
Write-in		65	0.15
Total votes		43,574	100%

==== District 65 ====
2022 Minnesota Senate district 65 DFL primary
Party	Candidate	Votes	%
Democratic (DFL)	Sandy Pappas (incumbent)	4,842	65.56
Democratic (DFL)	Sheigh Freeberg	1,672	22.64
Democratic (DFL)	Zuki Ellis	872	11.81
Total votes		7,386	100%

2022 Minnesota Senate district 65 election
Party	Candidate	Votes	%
Democratic (DFL)	Sandy Pappas (incumbent)	20,228	80.12
Republican	Paul Holmgren	4,960	19.65
Write-in		58	0.23
Total votes		25,246	100%

==== District 66 ====
2022 Minnesota Senate district 66 election
Party	Candidate	Votes	%
Democratic (DFL)	Clare Oumou Verbeten	23,987	78.41
Republican	Mikki M. Murray	5,522	18.05
Libertarian	Jeremy Peichel	1,061	3.47
Write-in		23	0.08
Total votes		30,593	100%

==== District 67 ====
2022 Minnesota Senate district 67 election
Party	Candidate	Votes	%
Democratic (DFL)	Foung Hawj (incumbent)	14,692	96.59
Write-in		518	3.41
Total votes		15,210	100%

== See also ==
- 2022 Minnesota gubernatorial election
- 2022 Minnesota House of Representatives election
- 2022 Minnesota elections
- List of Minnesota state legislatures
