= Angela Nelson =

Angela Nelson may refer to:

- Angela Nelson (politician), American politician
- Angela Nelson (Coronation Street), fictional character
