= Robyn Gulley =

American politician

Member-elect of the Minnesota Senate from the 65th district
- Assuming office January 12, 2027
- Succeeding: Sandy Pappas

Personal details
- Party: Democratic–Farmer–Labor

Robyn Gulley is an American politician who is a member-elect of the Minnesota Senate from the 65th district.
