= Mark Legvold =

American politician

Member-elect of the Minnesota Senate from the 58th district
- Assuming office January 12, 2027
- Succeeding: Bill Lieske

Personal details
- Party: Democratic–Farmer–Labor

Mark Legvold is an American politician who is a member-elect of the Minnesota Senate from the 58th district.
