= Paul Cumings (politician) =

American politician

Member-elect of the Minnesota Senate from the 53rd district
- Assuming office January 12, 2027
- Succeeding: Matt Klein

Personal details
- Party: Minnesota Democratic–Farmer–Labor Party

Paul Cumings is an American politician who is a member-elect of the Minnesota Senate from the 53rd district. He was elected on November 3, 2026.
