= Kristy Janigo =

American politician

Member-elect of the Minnesota Senate from the 37th district
- Assuming office January 12, 2027
- Succeeding: Warren Limmer

Personal details
- Party: Democratic–Farmer–Labor

Kristy Janigo is an American politician who is the member-elect for the 37th district in the Minnesota Senate.
