= Simon Trautmann Cordova =

American politician

Member-elect of the Minnesota Senate from the 51st district
- Assuming office January 12, 2027
- Succeeding: Melissa Wiklund

Personal details
- Party: Democratic-Farmer-Labor Party

Simon Trautmann Cordova is an American politician who is Member-elect of the Minnesota Senate from the 51st district. He was elected on November 3, 2026.
