= Minnesota's 65th Senate district =

American legislative district

Minnesota's 65th State Senate district
Senator
Sandy Pappas; DFL–Saint Paul
since January 8, 1991
- Demographics: 49.1% White; 18.8% Black; 9.6% Hispanic; 13.6% Asian; 1.4% Native American; 3.9% Other; 3.6% Multiracial
- Population (2020): 68,387

The 65th district of the Minnesota Senate encompasses the center of Minnesota's State Capital, and the county seat of Ramsey, Saint Paul, including St. Paul Downtown Airport. It formerly included Clearwater, Pennington, Red Lake, Mahomen, Norman, Becker, and Hubbard Counties. The district is represented by Democratic-Farmer-Labor Senator Sandy Pappas, former president of the Senate.

== List of senators ==
Session	Image	Senator	Party	Term start	Term end	Home	Counties represented
39th		Daniel P. O'Neill	Nonpartisan Election	January 4, 1915	January 5, 1919	Thief River Falls	Clearwater, Pennington and Red Lake
40th		Daniel P. O'Neill	Nonpartisan Election	January 4, 1915	January 5, 1919	Thief River Falls	Clearwater, Pennington and Red Lake
41st		Oscar Albert Naplin	Nonpartisan Election	January 6, 1919	December 31, 1922	Thief River Falls	Clearwater, Pennington and Red Lake
42nd		Oscar Albert Naplin	Nonpartisan Election	January 6, 1919	December 31, 1922	Thief River Falls	Clearwater, Pennington and Red Lake
43rd		C. L. Hansen	Nonpartisan Election	January 1, 1923	January 2, 1927	Thief River Falls	Clearwater, Pennington and Red Lake
44th		C. L. Hansen	Nonpartisan Election	January 1, 1923	January 2, 1927	Thief River Falls	Clearwater, Pennington and Red Lake
45th		Laura Emelia Naplin	Nonpartisan Election-Liberal Caucus	February 15, 1927	January 6, 1935	Thief River Falls	Clearwater, Pennington and Red Lake
46th		Laura Emelia Naplin	Nonpartisan Election-Liberal Caucus	February 15, 1927	January 6, 1935	Thief River Falls	Clearwater, Pennington and Red Lake
47th		Laura Emelia Naplin	Nonpartisan Election-Liberal Caucus	February 15, 1927	January 6, 1935	Thief River Falls	Clearwater, Pennington and Red Lake
48th		Laura Emelia Naplin	Nonpartisan Election-Liberal Caucus	February 15, 1927	January 6, 1935	Thief River Falls	Clearwater, Pennington and Red Lake
49th		E. L. Tungseth	Nonpartisan Election	January 7, 1935	January 3, 1943	Thief River Falls	Clearwater, Pennington and Red Lake
50th		E. L. Tungseth	Nonpartisan Election	January 7, 1935	January 3, 1943	Thief River Falls	Clearwater, Pennington and Red Lake
51st		E. L. Tungseth	Nonpartisan Election	January 7, 1935	January 3, 1943	Thief River Falls	Clearwater, Pennington and Red Lake
52nd		E. L. Tungseth	Nonpartisan Election	January 7, 1935	January 3, 1943	Thief River Falls	Clearwater, Pennington and Red Lake
53rd		William E. Dahlquist	Nonpartisan Election	January 4, 1943	January 2, 1955	Thief River Falls	Clearwater, Pennington and Red Lake
54th		William E. Dahlquist	Nonpartisan Election	January 4, 1943	January 2, 1955	Thief River Falls	Clearwater, Pennington and Red Lake
55th		William E. Dahlquist	Nonpartisan Election	January 4, 1943	January 2, 1955	Thief River Falls	Clearwater, Pennington and Red Lake
56th		William E. Dahlquist	Nonpartisan Election	January 4, 1943	January 2, 1955	Thief River Falls	Clearwater, Pennington and Red Lake
57th		William E. Dahlquist	Nonpartisan Election - Conservative Caucus	January 4, 1943	January 2, 1955	Thief River Falls	Clearwater, Pennington and Red Lake
58th		William E. Dahlquist	Nonpartisan Election - Conservative Caucus	January 4, 1943	January 2, 1955	Thief River Falls	Clearwater, Pennington and Red Lake
59th		Roy Edwin Wiseth	Nonpartisan Election-Liberal Caucus	January 3, 1955	January 6, 1963	Goodridge	Clearwater, Pennington and Red Lake
60th		Roy Edwin Wiseth	Nonpartisan Election-Liberal Caucus	January 3, 1955	January 6, 1963	Goodridge	Clearwater, Pennington and Red Lake
61st		Roy Edwin Wiseth	Nonpartisan Election-Liberal Caucus	January 3, 1955	January 6, 1963	Goodridge	Clearwater, Pennington and Red Lake
62nd		Roy Edwin Wiseth	Nonpartisan Election-Liberal Caucus	January 3, 1955	January 6, 1963	Goodridge	Clearwater, Pennington and Red Lake
63rd		Norman J. Larson	Nonpartisan Election - Conservative Caucus	January 7, 1963	January 1, 1967	Ada	Clearwater, Mahnomen and Norman
64th		Norman J. Larson	Nonpartisan Election - Conservative Caucus	January 7, 1963	January 1, 1967	Ada	Clearwater, Mahnomen and Norman
65th		Robert V. Leiseth	Nonpartisan Election - Conservative Caucus	January 2, 1967	January 3, 1971	Detroit Lakes	Becker, Clearwater, Hubbard County and Mahnomen
66th		Robert V. Leiseth	Nonpartisan Election - Conservative Caucus	January 2, 1967	January 3, 1971	Detroit Lakes	Becker, Clearwater, Hubbard County and Mahnomen
67th		Gerald L. Willet	Nonpartisan Election-Liberal Caucus	January 4, 1971	December 31, 1972	Park Rapids	Becker, Clearwater, Hubbard County and Mahnomen
68th		Nicholas D. Coleman	Nonpartisan Election - Democratic-Farmer-Labor Caucus	January 1, 1973	January 4, 1981	Saint Paul	Ramsey
69th		Nicholas D. Coleman	Nonpartisan Election - Democratic-Farmer-Labor Caucus	January 1, 1973	January 4, 1981	Saint Paul	Ramsey
70th		Nicholas D. Coleman	Democratic-Farmer-Labor	January 1, 1973	January 4, 1981	Saint Paul	Ramsey
71st		Nicholas D. Coleman	Democratic-Farmer-Labor	January 1, 1973	January 4, 1981	Saint Paul	Ramsey
72nd		Donald M. Moe	Democratic-Farmer-Labor	January 5, 1981	January 6, 1991	Saint Paul	Ramsey
73rd		Donald M. Moe	Democratic-Farmer-Labor	January 5, 1981	January 6, 1991	Saint Paul	Ramsey
74th		Donald M. Moe	Democratic-Farmer-Labor	January 5, 1981	January 6, 1991	Saint Paul	Ramsey
75th		Donald M. Moe	Democratic-Farmer-Labor	January 5, 1981	January 6, 1991	Saint Paul	Ramsey
76th		Donald M. Moe	Democratic-Farmer-Labor	January 5, 1981	January 6, 1991	Saint Paul	Ramsey
78th		Sandy Pappas	Democratic-Farmer-Labor	January 7, 1991	Incumbent	Saint Paul	Ramsey
79th		Sandy Pappas	Democratic-Farmer-Labor	January 7, 1991	Incumbent	Saint Paul	Ramsey
80th		Sandy Pappas	Democratic-Farmer-Labor	January 7, 1991	Incumbent	Saint Paul	Ramsey
81st		Sandy Pappas	Democratic-Farmer-Labor	January 7, 1991	Incumbent	Saint Paul	Ramsey
82nd		Sandy Pappas	Democratic-Farmer-Labor	January 7, 1991	Incumbent	Saint Paul	Ramsey
83rd		Sandy Pappas	Democratic-Farmer-Labor	January 7, 1991	Incumbent	Saint Paul	Ramsey
84th		Sandy Pappas	Democratic-Farmer-Labor	January 7, 1991	Incumbent	Saint Paul	Ramsey
86th		Sandy Pappas	Democratic-Farmer-Labor	January 7, 1991	Incumbent	Saint Paul	Ramsey
88th		Sandy Pappas	Democratic-Farmer-Labor	January 7, 1991	Incumbent	Saint Paul	Ramsey
90th		Sandy Pappas	Democratic-Farmer-Labor	January 7, 1991	Incumbent	Saint Paul	Ramsey
91st		Sandy Pappas	Democratic-Farmer-Labor	January 7, 1991	Incumbent	Saint Paul	Ramsey
92nd		Sandy Pappas	Democratic-Farmer-Labor	January 7, 1991	Incumbent	Saint Paul	Ramsey
93rd		Sandy Pappas	Democratic-Farmer-Labor	January 7, 1991	Incumbent	Saint Paul	Ramsey
94th		Sandy Pappas	Democratic-Farmer-Labor	January 7, 1991	Incumbent	Saint Paul	Ramsey

== Recent elections ==
=== 2022 ===
The candidate filing deadline was May 31, 2022. The general election was held on November 8, 2022, resulting in Pappas' victory.

2022 Minnesota Senate election
Party	Candidate	Votes	%
Democratic (DFL)	Sandy Pappas	20,228	80.1
Republican	Paul Holmgren	4,960	19.5
Write-in	N/A	58	0.2
Total votes		25,246	100.0
Democratic (DFL) hold			

=== 2020 ===
The candidate filing deadline was June 6, 2020. The general election was held on November 3, 2020, resulting in Pappas' victory.

2020 Minnesota Senate election
Party	Candidate	Votes	%
Democratic (DFL)	Sandy Pappas	31,552	81.5
Republican	Paul Holmgren	7,064	18.2
Write-in	N/A	113	0.3
Total votes		38,729	100.0
Democratic (DFL) hold			

=== 2016 ===
The candidate filing deadline was May 31, 2016. The general election was held on November 8, 2016, resulting in Pappas' victory.

Minnesota State Senate election, 2008
Party	Candidate	Votes	%
Democratic (DFL)	Sandy Pappas	27,743	81.1
Republican	Jason Delmont	6,497	18.9
Total votes		34,222	100.0
Democratic (DFL) hold			

=== 2012 ===
Elections for the Minnesota State Senate occurred after state-wide redistricting from 2010. The signature-filing deadline for candidates wishing to run in this election was June 5, 2012. Susan Pappas defeated Rick Karschnia in the general election.

Minnesota State Senate election, 2008
Party	Candidate	Votes	%
Democratic (DFL)	Sandy Pappas	27,365	82
Republican	Rick Karschnia	5,998	18
Total votes		33,363	100.0
hold			
