= Rod Skoe =

American politician

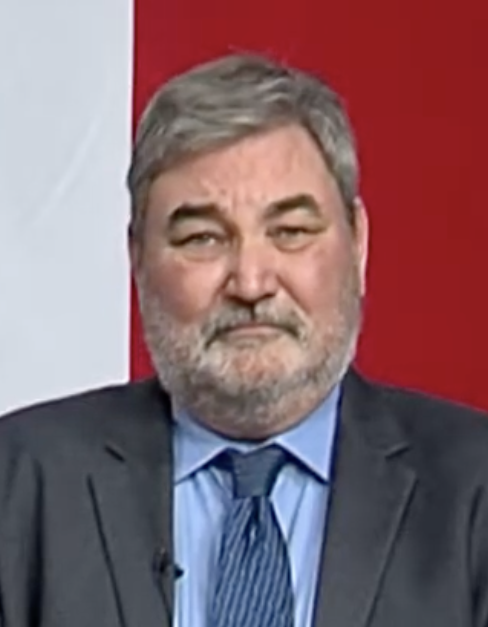
- Skoe in 2016

Member of the Minnesota Senate from the 2nd district
- In office January 7, 2003 – January 2, 2017
- Preceded by: Roger Moe
- Succeeded by: Paul Utke

Member of the Minnesota House of Representatives from the 2B district
- In office January 5, 1999 – January 6, 2003
- Preceded by: Edgar Olson
- Succeeded by: Doug Lindgren

Personal details
- Born: August 9, 1954 (age 72)
- Party: Minnesota Democratic–Farmer–Labor Party
- Spouse: Sarah
- Children: 2
- Education: Augsburg College
- Occupation: farmer

Rod Skoe (born August 9, 1954) is a Minnesota politician and former member of the Minnesota Senate. A member of the Minnesota Democratic–Farmer–Labor Party (DFL), he represented District 2, which included all or portions of Becker, Beltrami, Clearwater, Hubbard, Lake of the Woods, Mahnomen, Otter Tail and Wadena counties in the northwestern part of the state.

== Education ==
Skoe completed high school at Kelliher High School in Kelliher, and later received a B.A. from Augsburg College in Minneapolis.

== Minnesota House of Representatives ==
Skoe served in the Minnesota House of Representatives representing District 2B from 1999 to 2003.

== Minnesota Senate ==
Skoe was first elected in 2002 and was re-elected in every subsequent election since then until 2016. He chaired the senate tax committee from 2012 to 2016. In 2016 he lost to Republican Paul Utke.

== Electoral history ==
Minnesota Senate Election District 2, 2012
Party	Candidate	Votes	%	±%
Democratic (DFL)	Rod Skoe (incumbent)	21,269	54.92	
Republican	Dennis Moser	17,423	44.99	

Minnesota Senate Election District 2, 2010
Party	Candidate	Votes	%	±%
Democratic (DFL)	Rod Skoe (incumbent)	15,588	52.95	−7.81pp
Republican	Dennis Moser	13,825	46.96	+7.83pp

Minnesota Senate Election District 2, 2006
Party	Candidate	Votes	%	±%
Democratic (DFL)	Rod Skoe (incumbent)	19,471	60.76	+2.86pp
Republican	Steven Booth	12,540	39.13	−2.89pp

Minnesota Senate Election District 2, 2002
Party	Candidate	Votes	%	±%
Democratic (DFL)	Rod Skoe	17,749	57.90	
Republican	Steven Booth	12,881	42.02	

== Personal life ==
He and his wife, Sarah, have two children.
