= Frank J. Rodriguez Sr. =

American politician

Member of the Minnesota House of Representatives
- In office June 26, 1979 – January 7, 1985
- Constituency: 65B (1983–1985); 67A (1979–1983)

Personal details
- Born: March 28, 1920 Sheridan, Wyoming, U.S.
- Died: February 9, 2007 (aged 86) Saint Paul, Minnesota, U.S.
- Resting place: Resurrection Cemetery, Mendota Heights, Minnesota, U.S.
- Party: Democratic (DFL)
- Spouse: Ramona F. Reyes
- Children: 7
- Education: Humboldt Senior High School
- Profession: Politician

Frank J. Rodriguez, Sr. (March 28, 1920 – February 9, 2007) was an American politician.

Rodriguez was born in Sheridan, Wyoming. In 1922, he moved with his family to Saint Paul, Minnesota and graduated from Humboldt Senior High School in 1940, in Saint Paul. Rodriguez worked in construction and was involved with the labor union movement. He was also involved with the Saint Paul Housing Authority. Rodriguez served in the Minnesota House of Representatives from 1979 to 1984 and was a Democrat. He died from a heart attack at United Hospital in Saint Paul, Minnesota. He was the first Hispanic member of the Minnesota House of Representatives.
