= Cherie Johnson (politician) =

- Johnson campaigning in 2026

Member of the Minnesota Senate from the 26th district
- Incumbent
- Assumed office Elect, takes office on January 4, 2027
- Preceded by: Jeremy Miller

Personal details
- Party: Republican
- Spouse: Ben Johnson
- Children: 7

Cherie Johnson is an American politician from the U.S. State of Minnesota.

Johnson began working as an english teacher at Hope Lutheran High School in 2010. She has also served on the boards of Winona’s Family and Children’s Center, and the Amara Rose Foundation. In 2026, she was elected to the Minnesota Senate.

== Personal life ==
Johnson is a Christian. Her father is a Vietnam Veteran. She and her husband participated in foster care from 2016-2026.
