= Angela Nelson (politician) =

American politician

Member-elect of the Minnesota Senate from the 35th district
- Assuming office January 12, 2027
- Succeeding: Jim Abeler

Personal details
- Party: Democratic
- Education: University of Minnesota Duluth; Hamline University
- Website: www.nelsonformn.com

Angela Nelson is an American politician of the Minnesota Democratic–Farmer–Labor Party who is the representative-elect for the 35th district in the Minnesota State Senate. She was elected at the 2026 election. She is an elementary school principal.
