= Chris Knoll =

American politician

Member-elect of the Minnesota Senate from the 21st district
- Assuming office January 12, 2027
- Succeeding: Bill Weber

Personal details
- Party: Republican

Chris Knoll is an American politician who is Member-elect of the Minnesota Senate from the 21st district.
