= Krish Subrahmanian =

American politician

Member-elect of the Minnesota Senate from the 49th district
- Assuming office January 2027
- Succeeding: Steve Cwodzinski

Personal details
- Party: Democratic
- Education: Harvard College; Cambridge University; Stanford University School of Medicine

Krish Subrahmanian is an American politician. A member of the Democratic Party, he is the member-elect for the 49th district of the Minnesota Senate.

Subrahmanian attended the Harvard College, earning his bachelor's degree in 2003. He also attended Stanford University School of Medicine, earning his Doctor of Medicine degree in 2012, and University of Cambridge earning a master's degree in 2006.
