= Sam Rosemark =

American politician

Member-elect of the Minnesota Senate from the 44th district
- Assuming office January 2027
- Succeeding: Tou Xiong

Personal details
- Party: Democratic (DFL)

Sam Rosemark is an American politician. A member of the Democratic–Farmer–Labor Party, he is the member-elect for the 44th district of the Minnesota Senate.
