= Judy Seeberger =

American politician

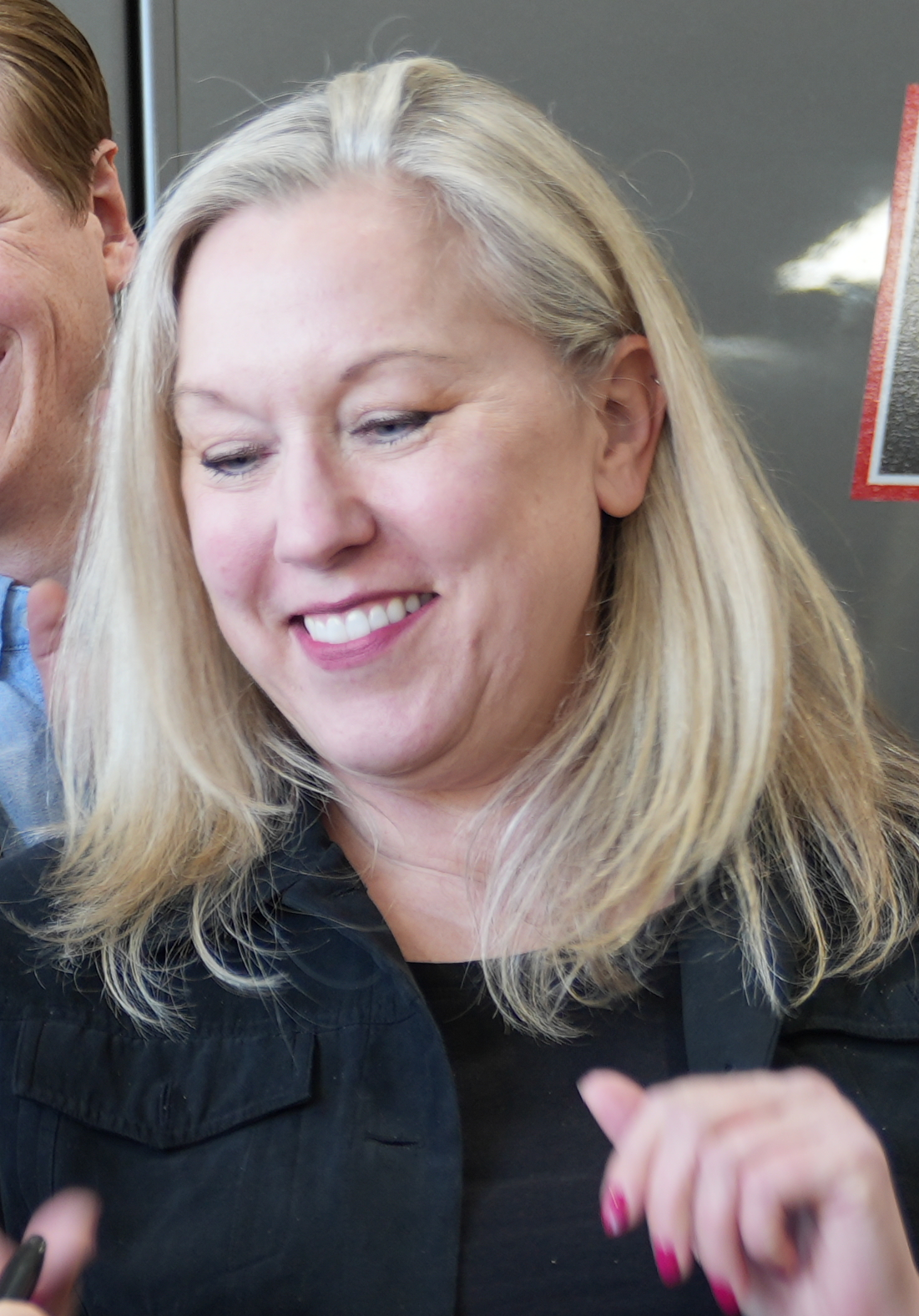
- Seeberger in 2024

Member of the Minnesota Senate from the 41st district
- Incumbent
- Assumed office January 3, 2023
- Preceded by: Karla Bigham (redistricted)

Personal details
- Party: Democratic (DFL)
- Education: University of Minnesota, Duluth (BA); Hamline University (MAT); Boston University (JD)
- Occupation: Teacher; Lawyer; Paramedic; Legislator

Judy Seeberger is an American politician representing District 41 in the Minnesota Senate since 2023.

Seeberger is a public school teacher and lawyer. She was a paramedic and fire department employee. During the 2022 Minnesota Senate election, she campaigned on supporting first responders, including investments in mental health and crime prevention. Seeberger also advertised supporting certain tax cuts, abortion access rights, red flag laws, and new paid family and medical leave programs.

== Electoral history ==
2022 Minnesota Senate District 41 election
Party	Candidate	Votes	%
Democratic (DFL)	Judy Seeberger	21,536	50.33
Republican	Tom Dippel	21,215	49.58
Total votes		42,791	100%
