= Karla Hult =

American politician

Member-elect of the Minnesota Senate from the 50th district
- Assuming office January 12, 2027
- Succeeding: Alice Mann

Personal details
- Party: Democratic–Farmer–Labor

Karla Hult is an American politician who is Member-elect of the Minnesota Senate from the 50th district.
