= Bonnie Westlin =

American lawyer and politician

Bonnie S. Westlin
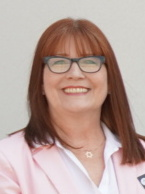
- Westlin in 2023

Member of the Minnesota Senate from the 42nd district
- Incumbent
- Assumed office January 3, 2023
- Preceded by: Redrawn district

Personal details
- Party: Democratic (DFL)
- Education: Hamline University
- Occupation: Lawyer; Legislator

Bonnie S. Westlin (born c. 1962) is an American lawyer and politician representing District 42 in the Minnesota Senate since 2023. She is a member of the Democratic–Farmer–Labor party and lives in Plymouth, Minnesota.

== Education and career ==
Westlin attended Hamline University, graduating with a B.A. in 1992 and a J.D. in 1995. She currently runs a one-person law firm in St. Louis Park, Minnesota.

== Minnesota Senate ==
In 2016, Westlin ran for Minnesota Senate District 34 and lost to Republican incumbent Warren Limmer by approximately 10,000 votes. In a 2020 rematch, she lost by 904 votes (1.56 percentage points).

She finally won a seat in the Senate in 2022 after redistricting placed her in a more politically friendly District 42.

== Electoral history ==
2016 Minnesota Senate election - District 34
Party	Candidate	Votes	%
Republican	Warren Limmer	29,229	60.18
Democratic (DFL)	Bonnie Westlin	19,263	39.66
Write-in		77	0.16
Total votes		41,569	100.0
Republican hold			

2020 Minnesota Senate election - District 34
Party	Candidate	Votes	%
Republican	Warren Limmer	29,347	50.74
Democratic (DFL)	Bonnie Westlin	28,443	49.18
Write-in		46	0.08
Total votes		57,836	100.0
Republican hold			

2022 Minnesota Senate election - District 42
Party	Candidate	Votes	%
Democratic (DFL)	Bonnie Westlin	23,752	57.70
Republican	Paul Hillen	17,395	42.26
Write-in		19	0.05
Total votes		41,166	100.0
