= Jared Gapinski =

American politician

Member-elect of the Minnesota Senate from the 13th district
- Assuming office January 12, 2027
- Succeeding: Jeff Howe

Personal details
- Party: Republican

Jared Gapinski is an American politician who is Member-elect of the Minnesota Senate from the 13th district. He was elected on November 3, 2026.
