= Tou Xiong =

American politician

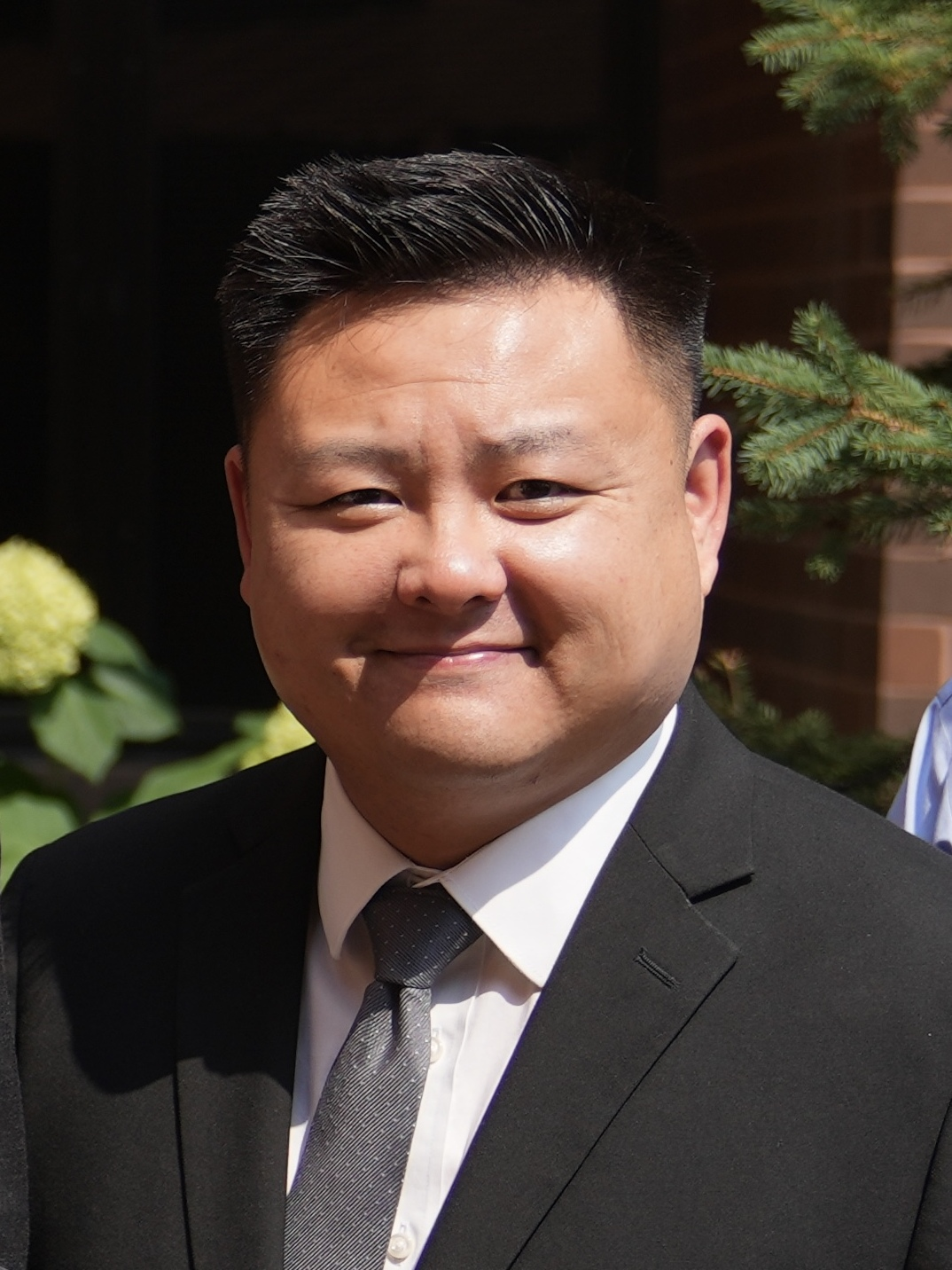
- Xiong in 2025

Member of the Minnesota Senate from the 44th district
- Incumbent
- Assumed office January 3, 2023
- Preceded by: Ann Johnson Stewart
- Succeeded by: Sam Rosemark (elect)

Member of the Minnesota House of Representatives from the 53A district
- In office January 8, 2019 – January 3, 2023
- Preceded by: JoAnn Ward
- Succeeded by: Mary Frances Clardy

Personal details
- Born: 1989 or 1990 (age 36–37)
- Party: Democratic (DFL)
- Education: St. Cloud State University; William Mitchell College of Law

Tou Xiong (RPA: Tub Xyooj; /ˈtuː ˈʒɒŋ/ TOO ZHONG; born 1989/1990) is an American politician and member of the Minnesota Senate. A member of the Minnesota Democratic–Farmer–Labor Party (DFL), he represents District 44. He previously served in the Minnesota House of Representatives, representing District 53A in the eastern Twin Cities metropolitan area.

== Early life, education, and career ==
Xiong is the second child of eight siblings, born to refugees from Laos. He graduated from Tartan High School. He attended St. Cloud State University, graduating with a Bachelor of Arts in economics, and William Mitchell College of Law, graduating with a Juris Doctor.

Xiong was an urban planning organizer for the Harrison Neighborhood Association, a legislative clerk for the Minnesota Housing Finance Agency, worked for the Minnesota Legal Aid, the Public Health Law Center, a trustee on the Ramsey County Library board of directors, and a member of the Senate DFL District 53 executive committee. He was elected to the Maplewood city council in 2014.

== Minnesota House of Representatives ==
Xiong was first elected to the Minnesota House of Representatives in 2018.

== Minnesota Senate ==
Xiong was elected to the Minnesota Senate in 2022. He did not seek reelection in 2026.

== Personal life ==
Xiong resides in Maplewood, Minnesota.

=== Legal issues ===
On January 8, 2022, Xiong was arrested in Blaine, Minnesota. He later pleaded guilty to a fourth-degree DUI in connection with the traffic stop. In August 2025, Xiong was pulled over and, after admitting to driving after consuming alcohol, was booked into Ramsey County Jail. In November 2025, he pleaded guilty to one count of operating a motor vehicle while under the influence.
