= 2000 Minnesota Senate election =

Minnesota Senate election, 2000
- November 7, 2000

All 67 seats in the Minnesota Senate 34 seats needed for a majority
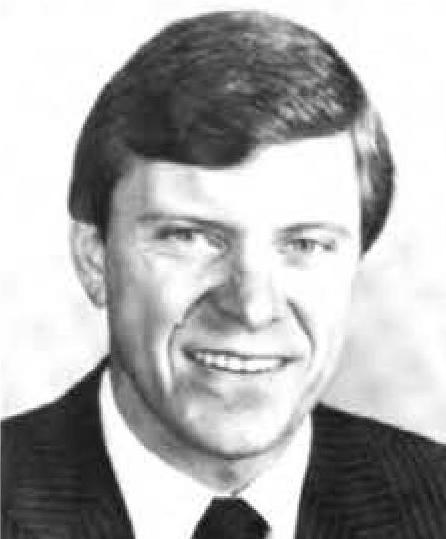
	Majority party	Minority party
Leader	Roger Moe	Dick Day
Party	Democratic (DFL)	Republican
Leader since	1980	July 9, 1997
Leader's seat	2nd–Erskine	28th–Owatonna
Last election	42 seats	24 seats
Seats before	40	26
Seats won	39	27
Seat change	▼1	▲1
Popular vote	1,219,497	1,040,132
Majority Leader before election
Roger Moe
Democratic (DFL)
Elected Majority Leader
Roger Moe
Democratic (DFL)

The 2000 Minnesota Senate election was held in the U.S. state of Minnesota on November 7, 2000, to elect members to the Senate of the 82nd Minnesota Legislature. A primary election was held on September 12, 2000.

The Minnesota Democratic–Farmer–Labor Party (DFL) won a majority of seats, remaining the majority party, followed by the Republican Party of Minnesota and one independent. The new Legislature convened on January 3, 2001.

== Results ==
Summary of the November 7, 2000 Minnesota Senate election results
Party	Candidates	Votes	Seats		
Party	Candidates	Votes	No.	∆No.	%
Minnesota Democratic–Farmer–Labor Party	67	1,219,497	39	▲1	58.21
Republican Party of Minnesota	64	1,040,132	27	▼1	40.30
Independence Party of Minnesota	10	29,534	0	Steady	0.00
Constitution Party of Minnesota	4	7,078	0	Steady	0.00
Independent	2	20,380	1	Steady	1.49
Total			67	±0	100.00
Turnout (out of 3,506,432 eligible voters)	2,458,303	70.11%		▲3.50 pp	
Source: Minnesota Secretary of State, Minnesota Legislative Reference Library

== See also ==
- Minnesota House of Representatives election, 2000
- Minnesota gubernatorial election, 1998
