= Minnesota's 37th Senate district =

American legislative district

Minnesota's 37th State Senate district
Senator
Warren Limmer
- Demographics: 83.1% White; 4.8% Black; 6.9% Asian; 0.6% Native American; 0.1% Hawaiian/Pacific Islander; 1.2% Other
- Population (2016) • Voting age • Citizens of voting age: 83,278; 62,858; 59,882

The Minnesota Senate, District 37, encompasses portions of Anoka County in the northern Twin Cities metropolitan area. It has formerly included Brown, Lac qui Parle, Lyon, Redwood, Yellow Medicine, Chippewa, Swift, Carver, Ramsey, Hennepin, Dakota, Washington, Goodhue, and Scott counties; and served Ramsey County for the longest. The district is currently represented by Republican Senator Warren Limmer.

== District profile ==
The district stretches along the southern edge of Anoka County from the Ramsey County and Hennepin County borders, excluding the cities of Fridley, Hilltop, and Columbia Heights.

Due to redistricting, the 37th district has been moved around various counties in the southern part of the state. The current iteration resulted from the 2010 redistricting by the Minnesota State Legislature, which became effective in 2012.

=== 2010 ===
Part of Anoka County

- Blaine
- Coon Rapids
- Spring Lake Park

As of 2016, the population of the 37th district was split 49.1% male and 50.9% female, with 48.2% of men and 51.8% of women being eligible to vote. 93.9% of residents were at least a high school graduate (or equivalent), and 30.5% had earned a bachelor's degree or higher. 31.8% of the population is of German ancestry, the largest ethnic group in the district, followed by Norwegian descent at 13.5%. The unemployment rate was at 4.8%.

Race	Population (2016 est.)	Share of total population
Total	83,278	100%
One race	80,469	96.6%
White	69,174	83.1%
Black or African American	3,962	4.8%
American Indian and Alaska Native	493	0.6%
Asian	5,769	6.9%
Native Hawaiian and Other Pacific Islander	44	0.1%
Other races	1,027	1.2%
Two or more races	2,809	3.4%
White and Black or African American	994	1.2%
White and American Indian and Alaska Native	499	0.6%
White and Asian	804	1%
Black or African American and American Indian and Alaska Native	9	0.0%

Ancestry	Population (2016 est.)	Share of total population
Total	83,278	100%
German	26,513	31.8%
Norwegian	11,205	13.5%
Irish	8,799	10.6%
Swedish	7,139	8.6%
Polish	5,606	6.7%
English	4,080	4.9%
French (except Basque)	3,169	3.8%
American	3,066	3.7%
Italian	2,162	2.6%
Subsaharan African	1,947	2.3%
Czech	1,582	1.9%
Scottish	1,186	1.4%
French Canadian	1,132	1.4%
Arab	1,005	1.2%
Danish	885	1.1%
Russian	790	0.9%
Ukrainian	486	0.6%
Swiss	419	0.5%
Scotch-Irish	340	0.4%
Welsh	262	0.3%
Greek	212	0.3%
Hungarian	203	0.2%
Slovak	154	0.2%
Lithuanian	74	0.1%
Portuguese	56	0.1%
West Indian (excluding Hispanic origin groups)	29	0.0%

== List of senators ==
Session	Senator	Party	Term start	Term end	Home	Counties represented
14th	William Pfaender Sr.	Republican	January 2, 1872	January 6, 1873	New Ulm	Brown; Lac qui Parle; Lyon; Redwood; Yellow Medicine
15th	J.S.G. Honner	Republican	January 7, 1873	January 4, 1875	Redwood Falls	Brown; Lac qui Parle; Lyon; Redwood; Yellow Medicine
16th	J.S.G. Honner	Republican	January 7, 1873	January 4, 1875	Redwood Falls	Brown; Lac qui Parle; Lyon; Redwood; Yellow Medicine
17th	John Winslow Blake	Republican	January 5, 1875	January 1, 1877	Marshall	Brown; Lac qui Parle; Lyon; Redwood; Yellow Medicine
18th	John Winslow Blake	Republican	January 5, 1875	January 1, 1877	Marshall	Brown; Lac qui Parle; Lyon; Redwood; Yellow Medicine
19th	Shadrach Azariah Hall	Republican	January 2, 1877	January 6, 1879	Yellow Medicine City	Brown; Lac qui Parle; Lyon; Redwood; Yellow Medicine
20th	Shadrach Azariah Hall	Republican	January 2, 1877	January 6, 1879	Minnesota Falls	Brown; Lac qui Parle; Lyon; Redwood; Yellow Medicine
21st	Knud H. Helling		January 7, 1879	January 3, 1881	Madelia	Brown; Lac qui Parle; Lyon; Redwood; Yellow Medicine
22nd	Samuel D. Peterson		January 4, 1881	January 1, 1883	New Ulm	Brown; Lac qui Parle; Lyon; Redwood; Yellow Medicine
23rd	Ziba B. Clarke		January 2, 1883	January 3, 1887	Benson	Chippewa; Lac qui Parle; Swift
24th	Ziba B. Clarke		January 2, 1883	January 3, 1887	Benson	Chippewa; Lac qui Parle; Swift
25th	Hiram Eugene Hoard	Republican	January 4, 1887	January 5, 1891	Montevideo	Chippewa; Lac qui Parle; Swift
26th	Hiram Eugene Hoard	Republican	January 4, 1887	January 5, 1891	Montevideo	Chippewa; Lac qui Parle; Swift
27th	Joseph W. Craven	Democratic	January 6, 1891	January 7, 1895	Norwood	Carver
28th	Joseph W. Craven	Democratic	January 6, 1891	January 7, 1895	Norwood	Carver
29th	Frederic "Fred" Iltis	Republican	January 8, 1895	January 2, 1899	Chaska	Carver
30th	Frederic "Fred" Iltis	Republican	January 8, 1895	January 2, 1899	Chaska	Carver
31st	Andrew Ryan McGill	Republican	January 3, 1899	October 31, 1905	Saint Paul	Ramsey
32nd	Andrew Ryan McGill	Republican	January 3, 1899	October 31, 1905	Saint Paul	Ramsey
33rd	Andrew Ryan McGill	Republican	January 3, 1899	October 31, 1905	Saint Paul	Ramsey
34th	Andrew Ryan McGill	Republican	January 3, 1899	October 31, 1905	Saint Paul	Ramsey
35th	Joseph Malcome Hackney	Republican	January 8, 1907	January 4, 1915	Saint Paul	Ramsey
36th	Joseph Malcome Hackney	Republican	January 8, 1907	January 4, 1915	Saint Paul	Ramsey
37th	Joseph Malcome Hackney	Republican	January 8, 1907	January 4, 1915	Saint Paul	Ramsey
38th	Joseph Malcome Hackney	Republican	January 8, 1907	January 4, 1915	Saint Paul	Ramsey
39th	Joseph Ansgar Jackson	Nonpartisan Election	January 5, 1915	January 3, 1927	Saint Paul	Ramsey
40th	Joseph Ansgar Jackson	Nonpartisan Election	January 5, 1915	January 3, 1927	Saint Paul	Ramsey
41st	Joseph Ansgar Jackson	Nonpartisan Election	January 5, 1915	January 3, 1927	Saint Paul	Ramsey
42nd	Joseph Ansgar Jackson	Nonpartisan Election	January 5, 1915	January 3, 1927	Saint Paul	Ramsey
43rd	Joseph Ansgar Jackson	Nonpartisan Election	January 5, 1915	January 3, 1927	Saint Paul	Ramsey
44th	Joseph Ansgar Jackson	Nonpartisan Election	January 5, 1915	January 3, 1927	Saint Paul	Ramsey
45th	Lloyd E. Lilygren	Nonpartisan Election	January 4, 1927	January 5, 1931	Saint Paul	Ramsey
46th	Lloyd E. Lilygren	Nonpartisan Election	January 4, 1927	January 5, 1931	Saint Paul	Ramsey
47th	Beldin H. Loftsgaarden	Republican	January 6, 1932	January 4, 1943	Saint Paul	Ramsey
48th	Beldin H. Loftsgaarden	Republican	January 6, 1932	January 4, 1943	Saint Paul	Ramsey
49th	Beldin H. Loftsgaarden	Republican	January 6, 1932	January 4, 1943	Saint Paul	Ramsey
50th	Beldin H. Loftsgaarden	Republican	January 6, 1932	January 4, 1943	Saint Paul	Ramsey
51st	Beldin H. Loftsgaarden	Republican	January 6, 1932	January 4, 1943	Saint Paul	Ramsey
52nd	Beldin H. Loftsgaarden	Republican	January 6, 1932	January 4, 1943	Saint Paul	Ramsey
53rd	Emery A. Johnson	Nonpartisan Election	January 5, 1943	January 6, 1947	Saint Paul	Ramsey
54th	Emery A. Johnson	Nonpartisan Election	January 5, 1943	January 6, 1947	Saint Paul	Ramsey
55th	Everett L. Peterson	Nonpartisan Election	January 7, 1947	January 1, 1951	Saint Paul	Ramsey
56th	Everett L. Peterson	Nonpartisan Election	January 7, 1947	January 1, 1951	Saint Paul	Ramsey
57th	Harold W. Schultz Sr.	Nonpartisan Election-Liberal Caucus	January 1, 1951	January 7, 1963	Saint Paul	Ramsey
58th	Harold W. Schultz Sr.	Nonpartisan Election-Liberal Caucus	January 1, 1951	January 7, 1963	Saint Paul	Ramsey
59th	Harold W. Schultz Sr.	Nonpartisan Election-Liberal Caucus	January 1, 1951	January 7, 1963	Saint Paul	Ramsey
60th	Harold W. Schultz Sr.	Nonpartisan Election-Liberal Caucus	January 1, 1951	January 7, 1963	Saint Paul	Ramsey
61st	Harold W. Schultz Sr.	Nonpartisan Election-Liberal Caucus	January 1, 1951	January 7, 1963	Saint Paul	Ramsey
62nd	Harold W. Schultz Sr.	Nonpartisan Election-Liberal Caucus	January 1, 1951	January 7, 1963	Saint Paul	Ramsey
63rd	Harmon T. Ogdahl Sr.	Nonpartisan Election-Conservative Caucus	January 8, 1963	January 1, 1973	Minneapolis	Hennepin
64th	Harmon T. Ogdahl Sr.	Nonpartisan Election-Conservative Caucus	January 8, 1963	January 1, 1973	Minneapolis	Hennepin
65th	Harmon T. Ogdahl Sr.	Nonpartisan Election-Conservative Caucus	January 8, 1963	January 1, 1973	Minneapolis	Hennepin
66th	Harmon T. Ogdahl Sr.	Nonpartisan Election-Conservative Caucus	January 8, 1963	January 1, 1973	Minneapolis	Hennepin
67th	Harmon T. Ogdahl Sr.	Nonpartisan Election-Conservative Caucus	January 8, 1963	January 1, 1973	Minneapolis	Hennepin
68th	William G. Kirchner	Nonpartisan Election-Conservative Caucus	January 2, 1973	January 1, 1981	Richfield	Hennepin
69th	William G. Kirchner	Nonpartisan Election-Independent Republican Caucus	January 2, 1973	January 1, 1981	Richfield	Hennepin
70th	William G. Kirchner	Independent Republican	January 2, 1973	January 1, 1981	Richfield	Hennepin
71st	William G. Kirchner	Independent Republican	January 2, 1973	January 1, 1981	Richfield	Hennepin
72nd	Steven O. Lindgren	Independent Republican	January 6, 1981	January 3, 1983	Richfield	Hennepin
73rd	Darril Wegscheid	Democratic-Farmer-Labor	January 4, 1983	January 1, 1989	Apple Valley	Dakota Washington
74th	Darril Wegscheid	Democratic-Farmer-Labor	January 4, 1983	January 1, 1989	Apple Valley	Dakota Washington
75th	Darril Wegscheid	Democratic-Farmer-Labor	January 4, 1983	January 1, 1989	Apple Valley	Dakota Washington
76th	Patricia Pariseau	Independent Republican	January 3, 1989	January 6, 2003	Farmington	Dakota Washington
77th	Patricia Pariseau	Independent Republican	January 3, 1989	January 6, 2003	Farmington	Dakota Washington
78th	Patricia Pariseau	Independent Republican	January 3, 1989	January 6, 2003	Farmington	Dakota; Goodhue; Scott
79th	Patricia Pariseau	Independent Republican	January 3, 1989	January 6, 2003	Farmington	Dakota; Goodhue; Scott
80th	Patricia Pariseau	Republican	January 3, 1989	January 6, 2003	Farmington	Dakota; Goodhue; Scott
81st	Patricia Pariseau	Republican	January 3, 1989	January 6, 2003	Farmington	Dakota; Goodhue; Scott
82nd	Patricia Pariseau	Republican	January 3, 1989	January 6, 2003	Farmington	Dakota; Goodhue; Scott
83rd	David L. Knutson	Republican	January 7, 2003	June 29, 2004	Burnsville	Dakota
83rd	Chris Gerlach	Republican	July 21, 2004	January 7, 2013	Apple Valley	Dakota
84th	Chris Gerlach	Republican	July 21, 2004	January 7, 2013	Apple Valley	Dakota
85th	Chris Gerlach	Republican	July 21, 2004	January 7, 2013	Apple Valley	Dakota
86th	Chris Gerlach	Republican	July 21, 2004	January 7, 2013	Apple Valley	Dakota
87th	Chris Gerlach	Republican	July 21, 2004	January 7, 2013	Apple Valley	Dakota
88th	Alice M. Johnson	Democratic-Farmer-Labor	January 8, 2013	January 2, 2017	Spring Lake Park	Anoka
89th	Alice M. Johnson	Democratic-Farmer-Labor	January 8, 2013	January 2, 2017	Spring Lake Park	Anoka
90th	Jerry Newton	Democratic-Farmer-Labor	January 3, 2017	January 1, 2023	Coon Rapids	Anoka
91st	Jerry Newton	Democratic-Farmer-Labor	January 3, 2017	January 1, 2023	Coon Rapids	Anoka
92nd	Jerry Newton	Democratic-Farmer-Labor	January 3, 2017	January 1, 2023	Coon Rapids	Anoka
93rd	Warren Limmer	Republican	January 2, 2023	Incumbent	Maple Grove	Hennepin
94th	Warren Limmer	Republican	January 2, 2023	Incumbent	Maple Grove	Hennepin

== Recent elections ==
=== 2016 ===
The candidate filing deadline was May 31, 2016. Incumbent Alice Johnson did not seek re-election. The primary election took place on August 9, 2016; both Jerry Newton and Brad Sanford ran unopposed. The general election was held on November 8, 2016, resulting in Newton's victory.

Minnesota State Senate election, 2008
Party	Candidate	Votes	%
Democratic	Jerry Newton	22,129	51.50
Republican	Brad Sanford	20,838	48.50
Total votes		42,967	100.0
Democratic hold			

=== 2012 ===
Elections for the Minnesota State Senate occurred after state-wide redistricting from 2010. The signature-filing deadline for candidates wishing to run in this election was June 5, 2012. Alice Johnson defeated incumbent Pam Wolf in the general election, neither of whom faced opposition in their primaries.

Minnesota State Senate election, 2008
Party	Candidate	Votes	%
Democratic	Alice Johnson	22,814	53.3
Republican	Pam Wolf	19,962	46.7
Total votes		42,776	100.0
Democratic hold			
