= Paul Utke =

American politician

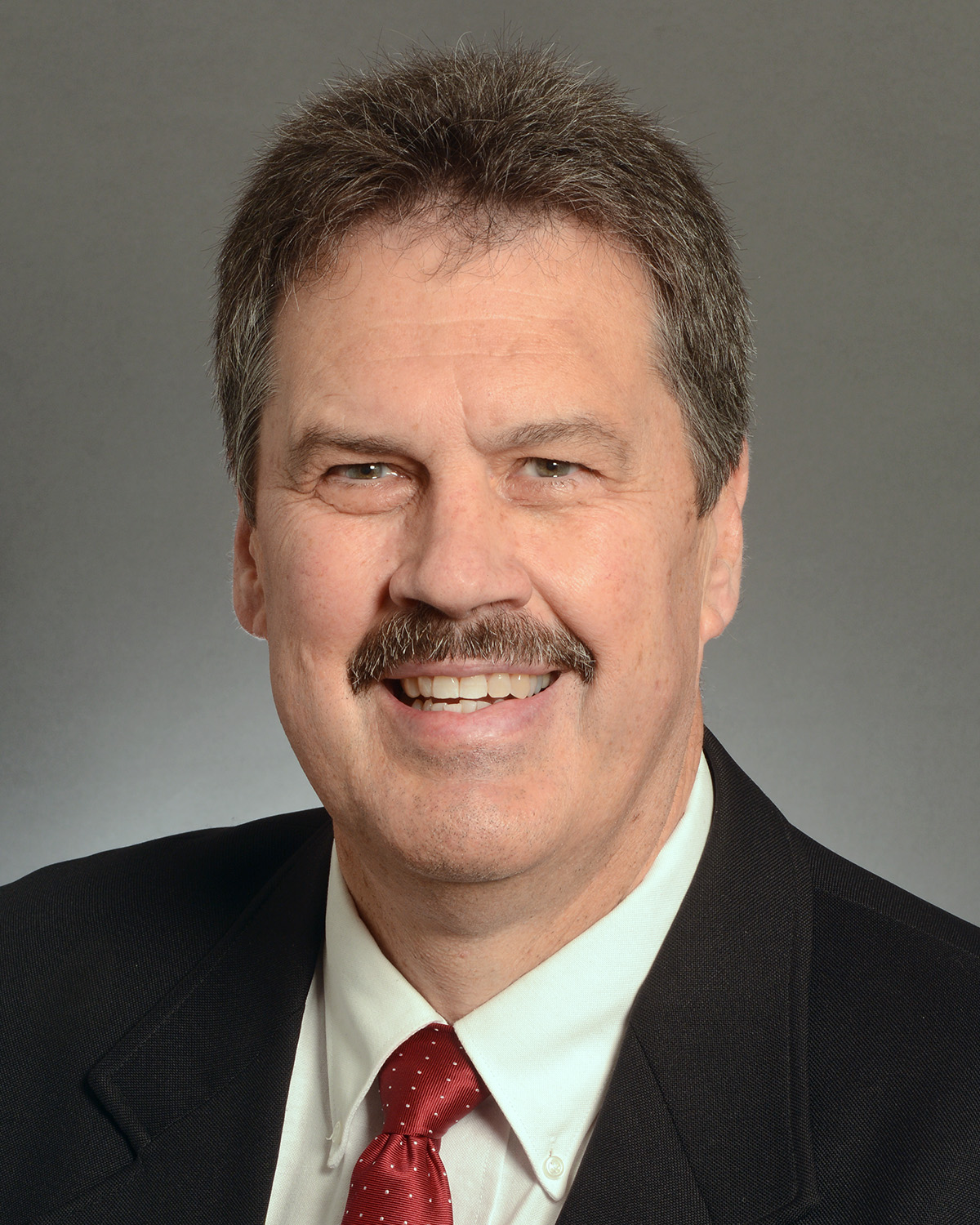

Member of the Minnesota Senate
- Incumbent
- Assumed office January 3, 2017
- Preceded by: Justin Eichorn (5th), Rod Skoe (2nd)
- Constituency: 5th (2023–present); 2nd (2017–2023)

Personal details
- Born: December 3, 1956 (age 69)
- Party: Republican
- Spouse: Nancy
- Children: 2
- Occupation: insurance broker

Paul Utke (/ˈʌtki/ UT-kee; born December 3, 1956) is an American politician and member of the Minnesota Senate. A member of the Republican Party of Minnesota, he represents District 5 in northwestern Minnesota.

== Early life and career ==
Utke was born on December 3, 1956, and raised in North Dakota. He is an insurance broker and was elected to the Park Rapids City Council in 2008. He has chaired the Hubbard County Republicans and has served on boards of several local organizations. He owned a hardware store in Park Rapids for 16 years.

== Minnesota Senate ==
Utke was first elected to the Minnesota Senate in 2016. He lost his seat in the 2026 Republican primary to Mike Wiener by a narrow margin.

== Personal life ==
Utke and his wife, Nancy, have two children and reside in Park Rapids.
