= Susan Pha =

American politician

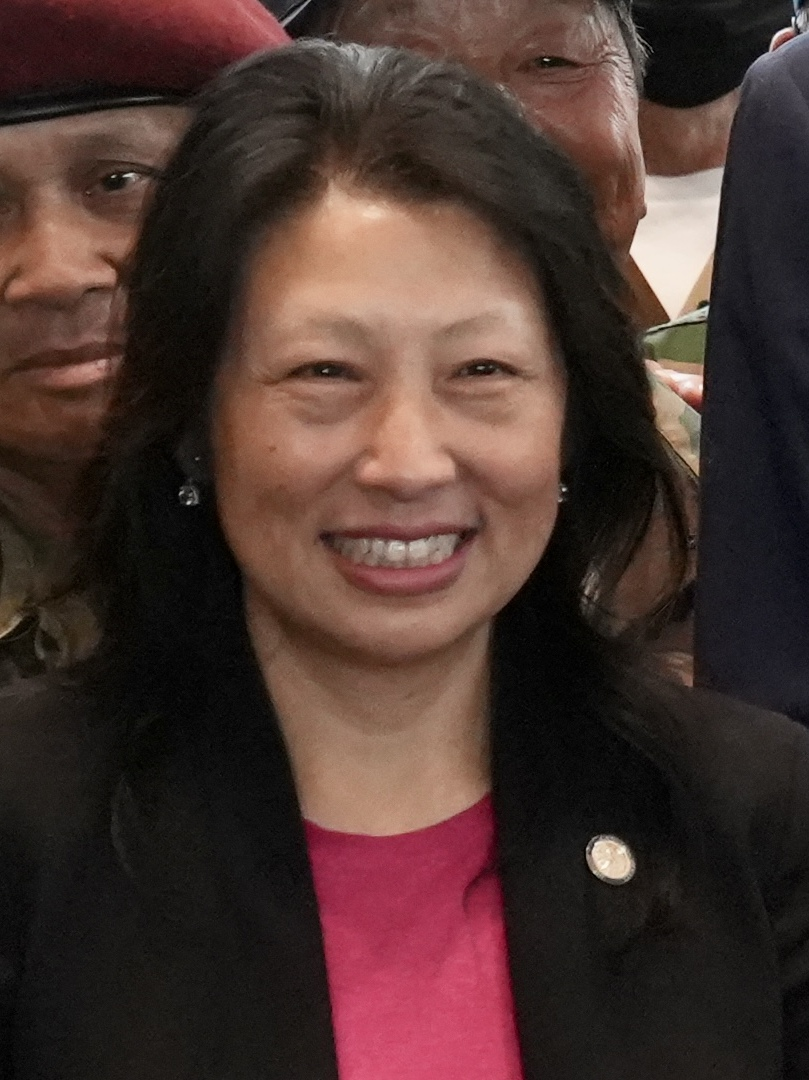
- Pha in 2026

Member of the Minnesota Senate from the 38th district
- Incumbent
- Assumed office January 3, 2023
- Preceded by: Roger Chamberlain

Personal details
- Born: 1976 or 1977 (age 48–49) Laos
- Party: Democratic (DFL)
- Children: 4

Susan Kaying Pha (RPA: Kab Yeeb Phaab; /pɑː/ PAH) is an American politician and businesswoman serving as a member of the Minnesota Senate for the 38th district. Elected in November 2022, she assumed office on January 3, 2023.

== Early life ==
Pha moved to the United States from Laos with her family as a refugee at age three. She was raised in San Diego and Fresno, California, as the oldest of eight children and part of the Hmong community in the United States.

== Career ==
From 1996 to 2011, Pha worked as a real estate agent. In 2010, she founded a publishing company. Pha was elected to the Brooklyn Park City Council in 2016. She was elected to the Minnesota Senate in November 2022, the second Hmong woman to do so.
