= Gene Dornink =

American politician (born 1962)

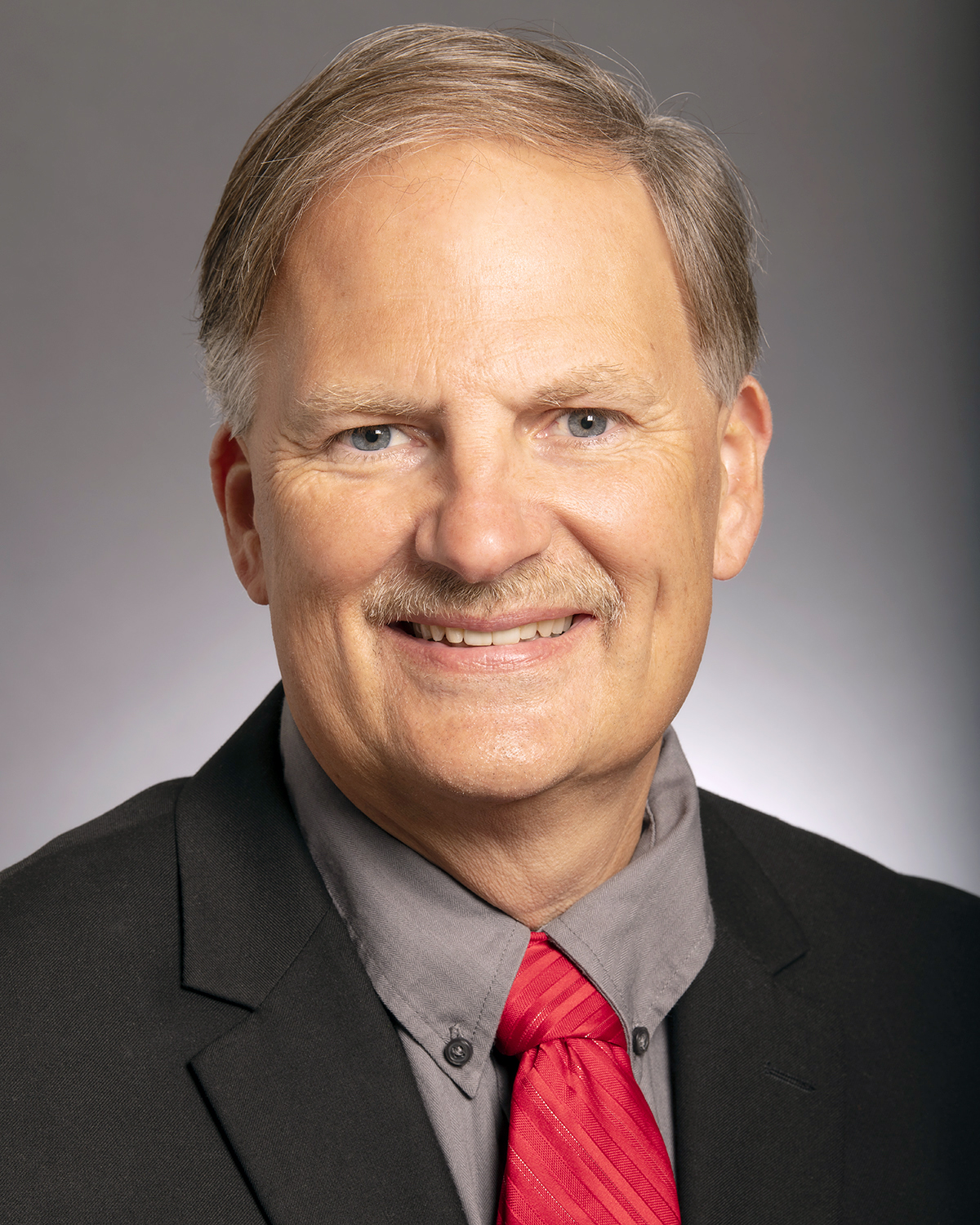

Member of the Minnesota Senate from the 23rd district 27th (2021-2023)
- Incumbent
- Assumed office January 5, 2021
- Preceded by: Dan Sparks

Personal details
- Born: December 30, 1962 (age 63) Austin, Minnesota, U.S.
- Party: Republican
- Spouse: Vicky
- Children: 12
- Education: Austin Area Vocational-Technical Institute

Gene Dornink (/ˈdɔːrnɪk/ DOR-nik; born December 30, 1962) is a Minnesota politician and member of the Minnesota Senate. A Republican, he represents District 23, which includes all of Freeborn County and parts of Faribault, Mower, Steele, and Waseca Counties in southeastern Minnesota.

== Minnesota Senate ==
Dornink defeated DFL incumbent Dan Sparks in the 2020 election. He was reelected in 2022, defeating DFL nominee Brandon Lawhead.

== Personal life ==
Dornink was born and raised on a dairy farm in southern Minnesota. He worked as a union carpenter for many years before starting his own carpentry business.

Dornink and his wife, Vicky, have 12 children. They reside in Brownsdale, Minnesota.

== Electoral history ==
2022 Minnesota State Senate District 23 - 2022
Party	Candidate	Votes	%	±%
Republican	Gene Dornink (Incumbent)	20,273	60.71	+11.84
Democratic (DFL)	Brandon Lawhead	13,051	39.09	−5.28

2022 Minnesota Senate District 23 Republican Primary
Party	Candidate	Votes	%
Republican	Gene Dornink (Incumbent)	5,874	71.49
Republican	Lisa Hanson	2,342	28.51
Total votes		8,216	100.0

2020 Minnesota State Senate District 27 - 2020
Party	Candidate	Votes	%	±%
Republican	Gene Dornink	19,759	48.87	+3.70
Democratic (DFL)	Dan Sparks (Incumbent)	17,941	44.37	−10.39

Minnesota State Senate District 27 - 2016
Party	Candidate	Votes	%	±%
Democratic (DFL)	Dan Sparks (Incumbent)	20,540	54.76	−13.46
Republican	Gene Dornink	16944	45.17	+13.48
