= Sandy Pappas =

American politician

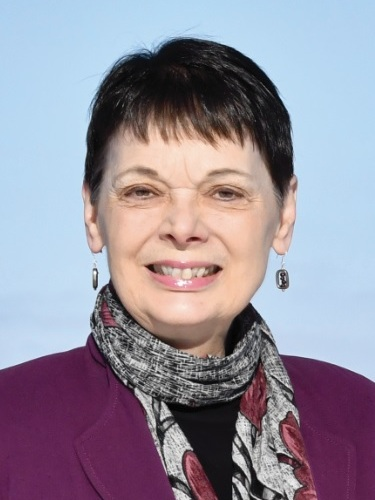
- Pappas in 2020

President of the Minnesota Senate
- In office January 8, 2013 – January 2, 2017
- Preceded by: Michelle Fischbach
- Succeeded by: Michelle Fischbach

Member of the Minnesota Senate from the 65th district
- Incumbent
- Assumed office January 8, 1991
- Preceded by: Donald Moe

Member of the Minnesota House of Representatives from the 65B district
- In office January 8, 1985 – January 7, 1991
- Preceded by: Frank J. Rodriguez Sr.
- Succeeded by: Carlos Mariani

Personal details
- Born: June 15, 1949 (age 77) Hibbing, Minnesota, U.S.
- Party: Democratic (DFL)
- Spouse: Neal Gosman
- Children: 3
- Education: Metropolitan State University; Harvard University

Sandra L. "Sandy" Pappas (born June 15, 1949) is an American politician who has been serving in the Minnesota Senate since 1991. A member of the Minnesota Democratic–Farmer–Labor Party (DFL), she represents District 65, which includes parts of Saint Paul in Ramsey County. Pappas served as President of the Minnesota Senate from 2013 to 2019.

In 1997, Pappas ran as the DFL-endorsed candidate for mayor of Saint Paul, losing to incumbent Norm Coleman. Before her election to the Senate, she served three terms in the Minnesota House of Representatives.

== Early life and education ==
Pappas was born in Hibbing, Minnesota, and attended Robbinsdale High School in Robbinsdale, Minnesota.

Pappas attended the University of Minnesota and Metropolitan State University, from which she earned a B.A. in public policy in 1986. She later attended the John F. Kennedy School of Government at Harvard University, earning an MPA.

== Minnesota House of Representatives ==
Pappas was first elected to the Minnesota House of Representatives in 1984 for District 65B. Her margin of victory in the Democratic-Farmer-Labor Party primary election was so small that a recount occurred.

Pappas served three terms in the House before running for Minnesota Senate in 1990.

== Minnesota Senate ==
Pappas was first elected to the Minnesota Senate in 1990, defeating incumbent Donald Moe in a DFL primary.

Pappas has been reelected in every election since, serving a total of 10 terms. She has served on the Capital Investment, Commerce, Finance, Rules and Administration, and State and Local Government Committees. She chaired the Higher Education Committee from 2007 to 2011 and the Education Committee from 2001 to 2003. She served as president pro tempore from 2003 to 2007.

After the DFL regained a majority in the 2012 election, Pappas was elected by her caucus to serve as President of the Minnesota Senate, starting in January 2013. Pappas was reelected to the Senate in 2016, 2020, and 2022. She chairs the Capital Investment Committee and sits on the committees on Finance, Judiciary and Public Safety, and Labor.

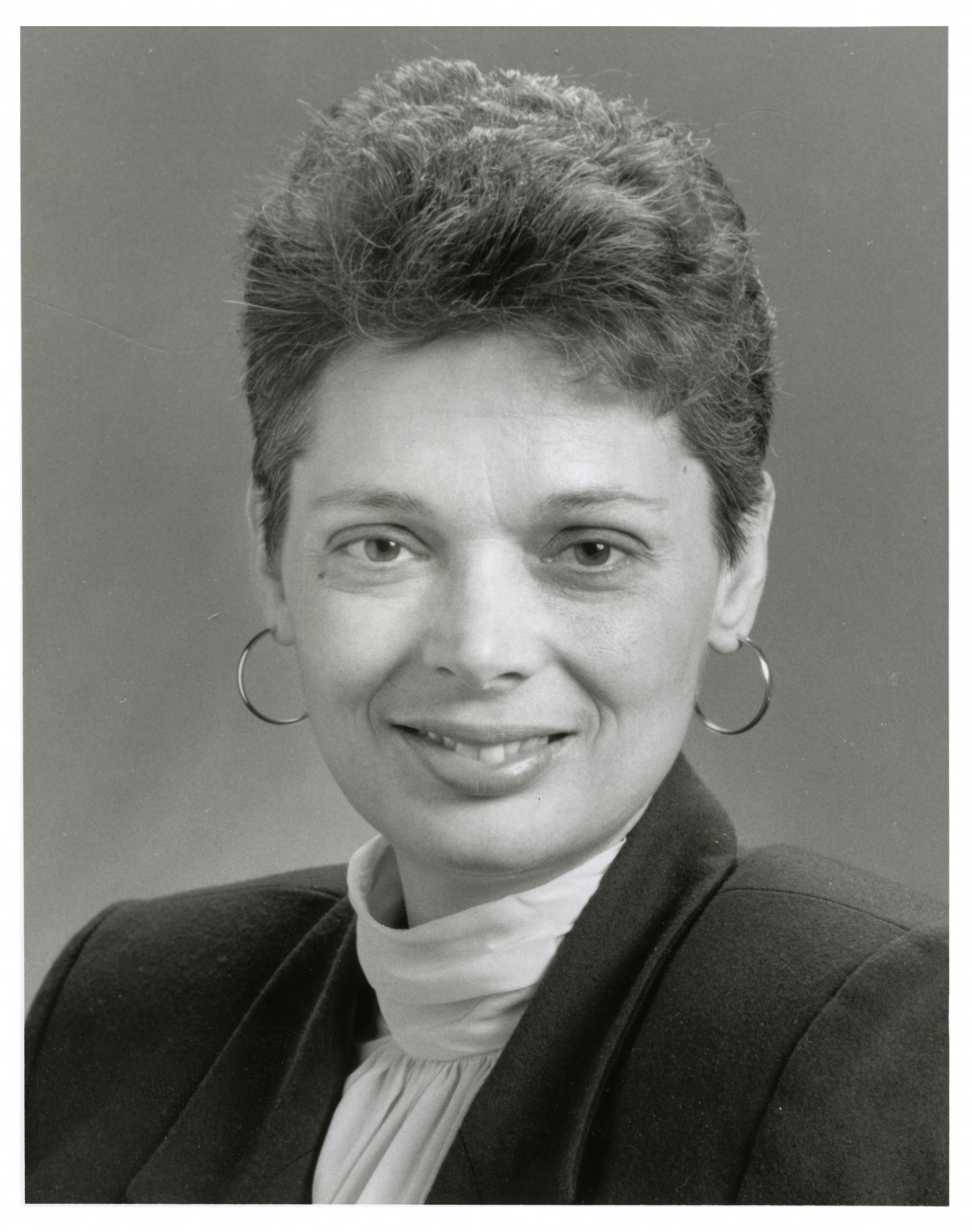
Senator Sandra L. Pappas, Minnesota Legislature, 1993-1994 Legislative Session.

== 1997 Saint Paul mayoral campaign ==
Pappas ran for mayor of Saint Paul in 1997 and lost to incumbent Norm Coleman.

== Personal life ==
Pappas is married to Neal Gosman. They have three children and 31 grandchildren. She is Jewish.

Minnesota House of Representatives
Preceded by Frank J. Rodriguez Sr.	Member of the Minnesota House of Representatives from the 65B district 1985–1990	Succeeded by Carlos Mariani
Minnesota Senate
Preceded by Donald Moe	Member of the Minnesota Senate from the 65th district 1991–present	Incumbent
Preceded by Michelle Fischbach	President of the Minnesota Senate; 2013–2017	Succeeded by Michelle Fischbach
