= Matt Klein =

American politician (born 1967)

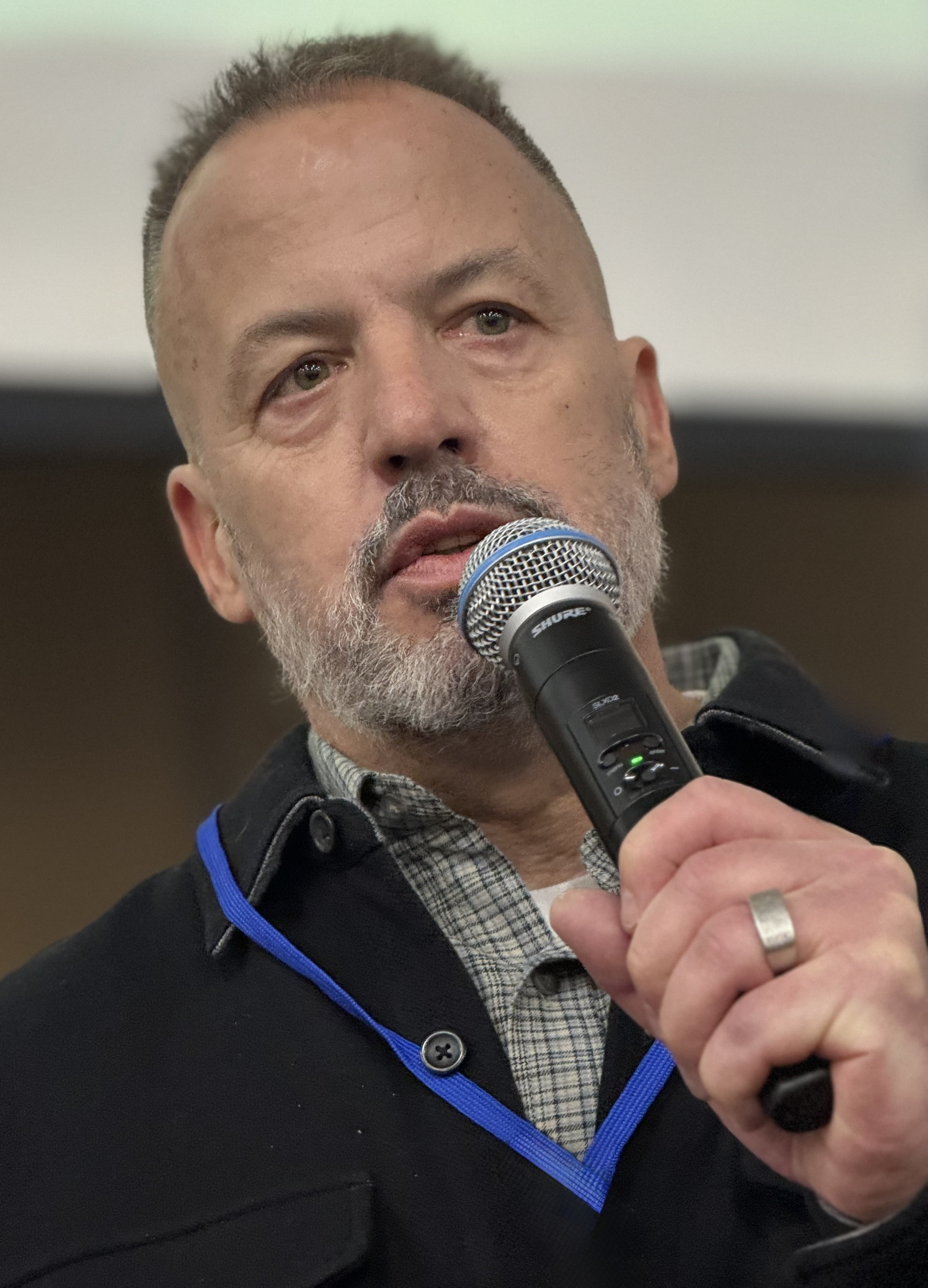

Member of the Minnesota Senate from the 53rd district
- Incumbent
- Assumed office January 3, 2017
- Preceded by: Jim Metzen

Personal details
- Born: Matthew David Klein; September 29, 1967 (age 58) Saint Paul, Minnesota, U.S.
- Party: Democratic
- Spouse: Kristine
- Children: 5
- Education: University of Wisconsin, Madison (BS); Mayo Clinic College of Medicine and Science (MD)

Matthew David Klein (born September 29, 1967) is an American politician and member of the Minnesota Senate. A member of the Minnesota Democratic–Farmer–Labor Party (DFL), he represents District 53 in the southeastern Twin Cities metropolitan area.

== Early life, education, and career ==
Klein was raised in Saint Paul and graduated from Highland Park High School in 1985. He attended the University of Wisconsin–Madison, graduating with a Bachelor of Science, and went on to graduate as a Doctor of Medicine from Mayo Medical School. Klein was elected to the West St. Paul–Mendota Heights–Eagan School Board in 2012. He is a doctor of internal medicine at the Mayo Clinic in Rochester.

== Minnesota Senate ==
Klein was first elected to the Minnesota Senate in 2016.

Governor Mark Dayton collapsed near the end of his 2017 State of the State address. Many rushed to his aid, including Klein.

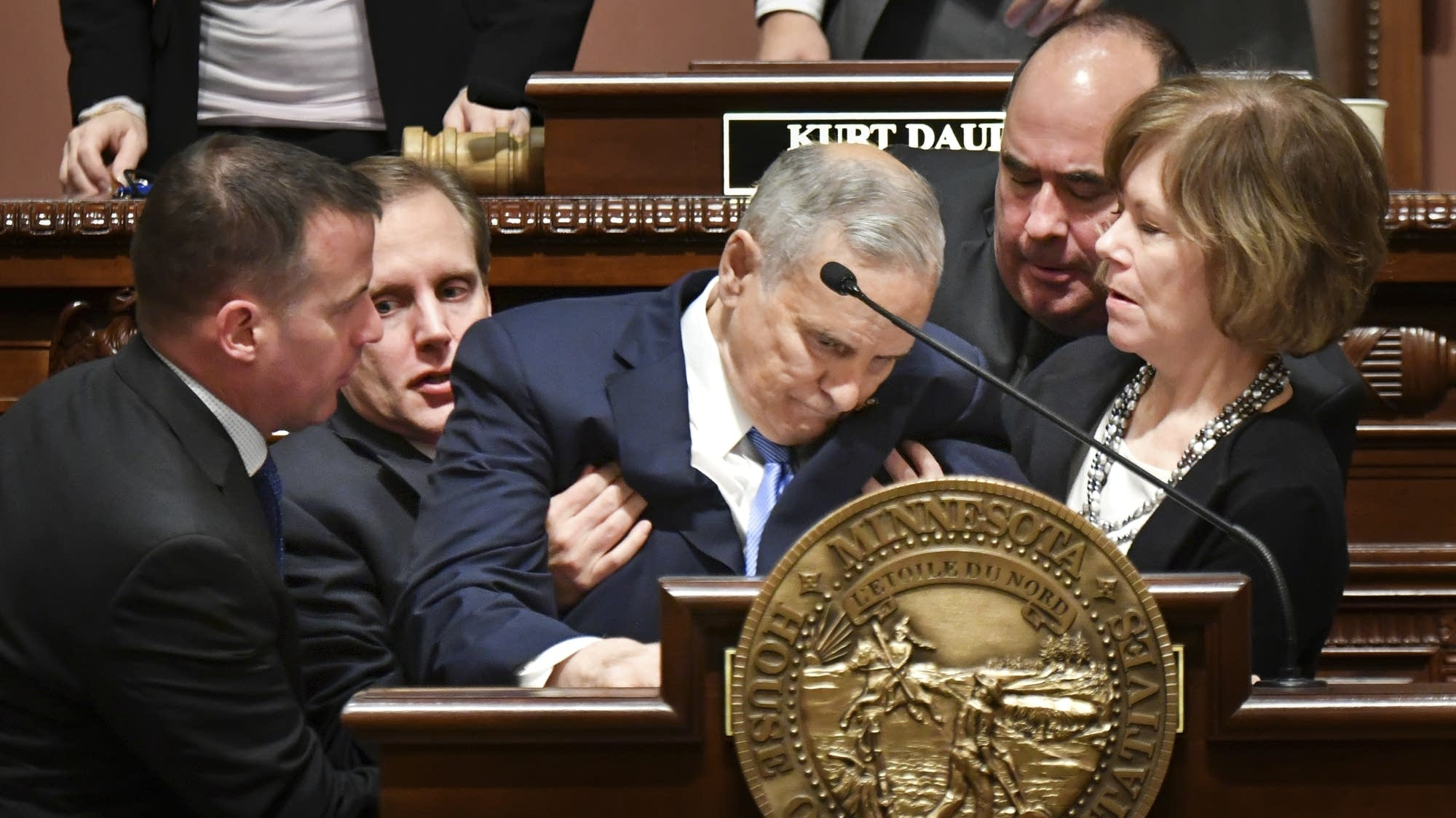
Gov. Mark Dayton collapsed near the end of his annual State of the State. Dayton is being helped by Sen. Klein, far left, Secretary of State Steve Simon, at Dayton's right, and Lt. Governor Tina Smith on his left.

Klein serves on the following Minnesota Senate committees:

- Commerce and Consumer Protection (chair)
- Taxes
- Energy

== 2026 U.S. House campaign ==
On May 6, 2025, Klein announced that he would seek the Democratic nomination for Minnesota's 2nd congressional district in the U.S. House of Representatives, vying to succeed the retiring Angie Craig, who is running for the U.S. Senate.

In April 2026, Klein apologized after participating in a political prediction market wager on his own election, betting $50 on himself to win the primary. The platform, Kalshi, determined the wager violated its rules and issued him and two other politicians a fine and a five-year ban. In 2024, Klein had introduced a bill that would have legalized and expanded gambling on sports in Minnesota, but the bill did not pass.

Klein vied with opponent Matt Little for the Minnesota DFL's endorsement. He lost decisively, as Little received 63% of the vote and the endorsement.

== Personal life ==
Klein and his wife, Kristine, have five children and reside in Mendota Heights.

== Electoral history ==
Minnesota Senate 53rd district election, 2022
Party	Candidate	Votes	%
Democratic (DFL)	Matt Klein (Incumbent)	21,501	58.24
Republican	Chris Rausch	15,374	41.64
	Write-in	42	0.11
Total votes		36,917	100.0

Minnesota Senate 52nd district election, 2020
Party	Candidate	Votes	%
Democratic (DFL)	Matt Klein (Incumbent)	29,730	60.58
Republican	Tomas Settell	19,291	39.31
	Write-in	58	0.12
Total votes		49,079	100.0

Minnesota Senate 52nd district election, 2016
Party	Candidate	Votes	%
Democratic (DFL)	Matt Klein	25,448	57.84
Republican	Mark Misukanis	18,485	42.01
	Write-in	65	0.15
Total votes		43,998	100.0
