= Melissa Wiklund =

American politician (born 1962)

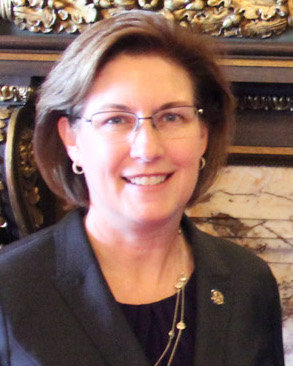
- Wilkund in 2017

Member of the Minnesota Senate from the 51st district
- Incumbent
- Assumed office January 8, 2013
- Preceded by: Redrawn district

Personal details
- Born: October 1, 1962 (age 64)
- Party: Democratic (DFL)
- Spouse: Craig
- Children: 2
- Education: University of Minnesota (B.E.E.)
- Occupation: legislator

Melissa Halvorson Wiklund (born 1962) is a Minnesota politician and member of the Minnesota Senate. A member of the Minnesota Democratic–Farmer–Labor Party (DFL), she represents District 51 in the southern Twin Cities metropolitan area, which includes the cities of Bloomington and Richfield. Wiklund's legislative priorities include education, health care, and job creation.

== Early life, education, and career ==
Wiklund was raised in Bloomington, Minnesota, and graduated from Bloomington Kennedy High School. Before her election to the Senate, she served on the Bloomington School Board for three years. She was elected to the school board in 2009 and later became its chair. On the school board, Wiklund chaired the Legislative and Superintendent Evaluation Committees and participated on the Labor Management Committee. In 1991, she graduated from the University of Minnesota with a B.E.E. and a degree in interior design.

== Personal life ==
Wiklund is married to her husband, Craig. They have two children and reside in Bloomington.

== Minnesota Senate ==
Wiklund was first elected to the Minnesota Senate in 2012. In the 2021 legislative session, she served on the Human Services Reform Finance and Policy Committee and the Technology and Reform Policy Committee. Wiklund was also the ranking minority member on the Health and Human Services Finance and Policy Committee.

On December 16, 2025, Wiklund announced she would retire at the end of 2026, when her fourth Senate term ends.

=== Past committees ===
- 94th Legislative Session (2025–2026): Health and Human Services (Chair), Commerce and Consumer Protection, Finance, Human Services.
- 90th Legislative Session (2017–2018): E-12 Finance, Health and Human Services Finance and Policy, Local Government.
- 89th Legislative Session (2015–2016): Finance: E-12 Policy and Budget Division, Health, Human Services and Housing, State and Local Government.
- 88th Legislative Session (2013–2014): Education, Finance: E-12 Division, Health, Human Services and Housing.

== Legislative action ==
Wiklund coauthored:

SF 472, The Alec Smith Emergency Insulin Act (Introduced and first reading on January 24, 2019). This bill would establish an insulin assistance program; establish an insulin assistance account in the special revenue fund; require drug manufacturers to pay an insulin product fee; provide for emergency refills; and appropriate money.

SF 820, Great Start for All Minnesota Children Act. This bill aims to address opportunity gaps and help the state's youngest residents. It would provide additional funding for early childhood education and development, child care, prenatal care and home visiting.

SF 1708, Spoken Language Health Care Interpreter Registry. This bill would create a registry of interpreters that pass a test in English on health care terms and interpreter ethics and standards to minimize errors and restore patient confidence. In addition to registered interpreters, the bill includes a tier called "certified interpreters". To get this designation on the registry, interpreters must have a certification in health care interpreting from an organization specified by the Department of Health.

== Electoral history ==
2020 Minnesota State Senate, District 50 General Election, 2016
Party	Candidate	Votes	%
DFL	Melissa Halvorson Wiklund Incumbent	30,516	66.62%
Republican	Dean Wm Mumbleau	15,243	33.28%
	Total Votes	45,808	

2016 Minnesota State Senate, District 50 General Election, 2016
Party	Candidate	Votes	%
DFL	Melissa Halvorson Wiklund Incumbent	24,921	59.73%
Republican	Kirsten Johnson	16,805	40.27%
	Total Votes	41,726	

2012 Minnesota State Senate, District 50 General Election, 2012
Party	Candidate	Votes	%
DFL	Melissa Halvorson Wiklund	25,300	61%
Republican	Vern Wilcox	16,193	39%
	Total Votes	41,493	
