= Bill Lieske =

American chiropractor and politician

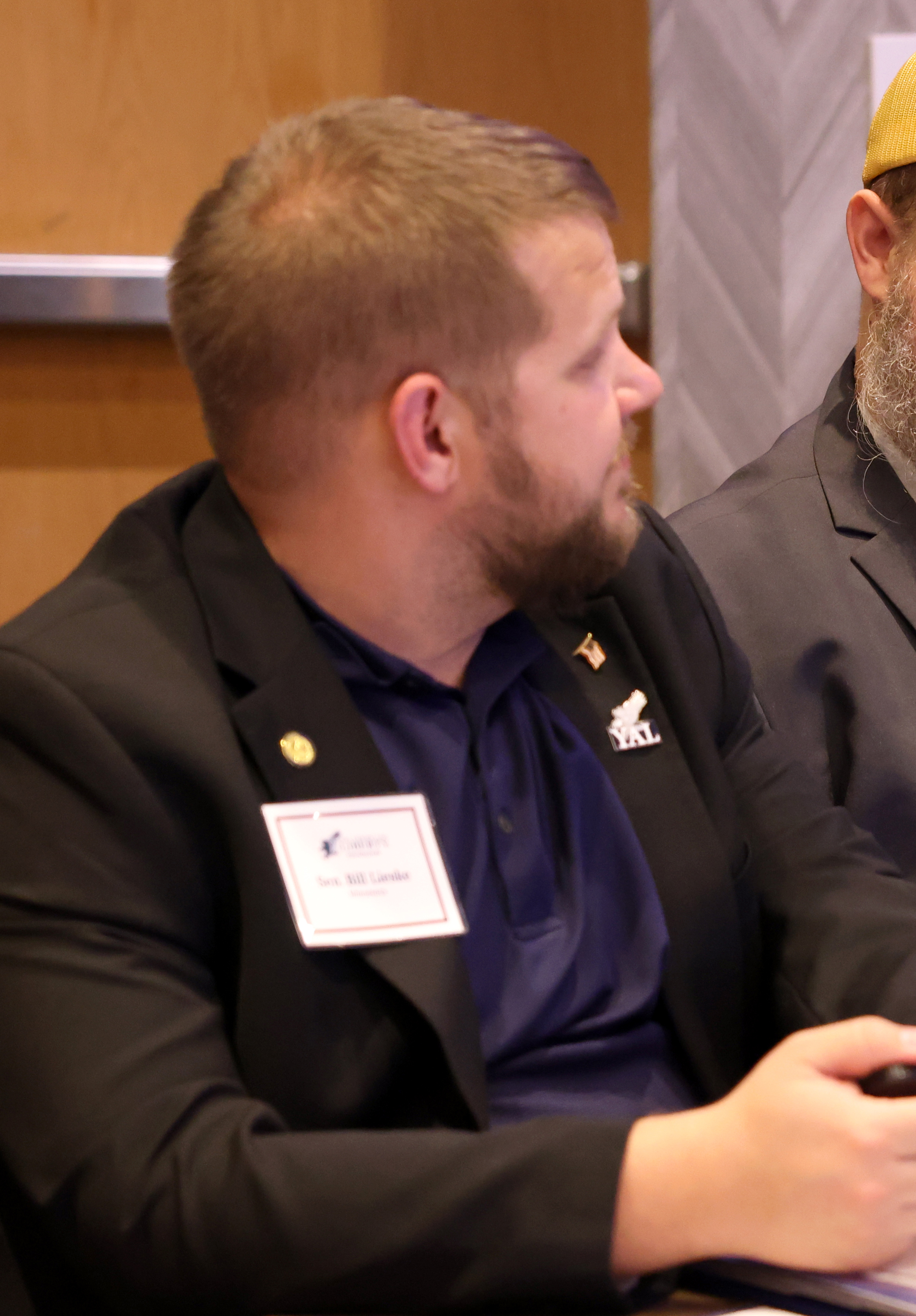

Member of the Minnesota Senate from the 58th district
- Incumbent
- Assumed office January 3, 2023
- Preceded by: Zach Duckworth (redistricting)

Personal details
- Born: 1989 or 1990 (age 35–36) Mankato, Minnesota, U.S.
- Party: Republican
- Children: 2
- Education: Northwestern Health Sciences University (DC)

Bill Lieske (/ˈlɪski/ LISK-ee; born 1989/1990) is an American chiropractor and politician serving as a member of the Minnesota Senate for the 58th district. Elected in November 2022, he assumed office on January 3, 2023.

== Early life and education ==
Lieske was born in Mankato, Minnesota, and raised in Lakeville. He earned a Doctor of Chiropractic degree from the Northwestern Health Sciences University.

== Career ==
In 2015, Lieske began operating his family's chiropractic clinic in Lonsdale, Minnesota. He was elected to the Minnesota Senate in November 2022. Lieske also serves on the Senate Labor Committee and Senate Health and Human Services Committee. In his first legislative session, Lieske introduced a bill that would waive the state veterans' cemetery burial fee for spouses and dependents.
