= 90th Minnesota Legislature =

Legislature of Minnesota, 2017–2019

Ninetieth Minnesota Legislature
←	89th	91st	→
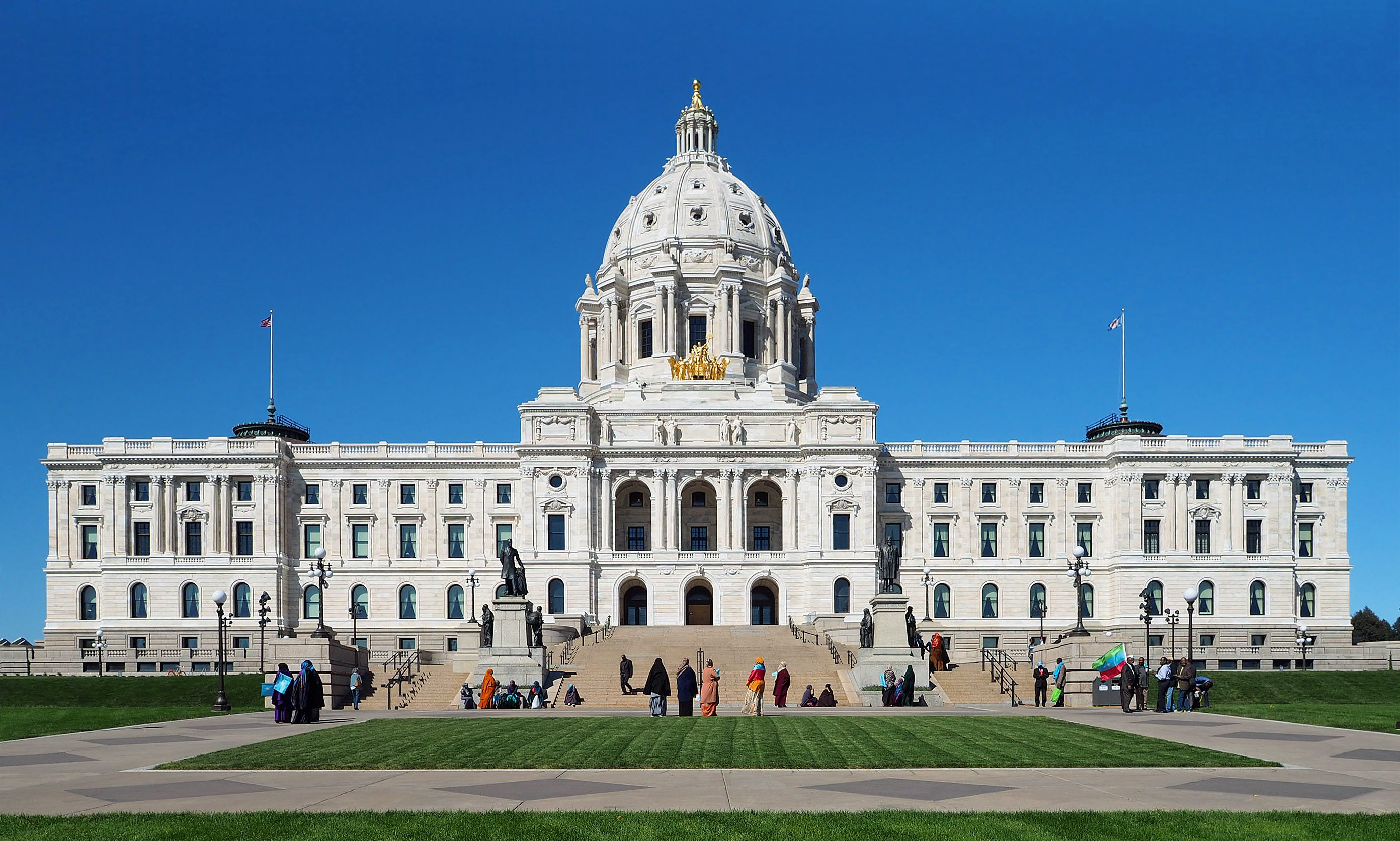
- Minnesota State Capitol

Overview
- Legislative body: Minnesota Legislature
- Term: January 3, 2017 – January 7, 2019
- Election: 2016 General Election

Senate
- Members: 67 senators
- President: Michelle Fischbach (R) until May 25, 2018
- Majority Leader: Paul Gazelka (R)
- Minority Leader: Tom Bakk (DFL)
- Party control: Republican Party

House of Representatives
- Members: 134 representatives
- Speaker: Kurt Daudt (R)
- Majority Leader: Joyce Peppin (R) until July 2, 2018
- Minority Leader: Melissa Hortman (DFL)
- Party control: Republican Party

Sessions
- 2017: January 3, 2017 – May 22, 2017
- 2018: February 20, 2018 – May 20, 2018

Special sessions
- 2017, 1st: May 23, 2017 – May 26, 2017

The Ninetieth Minnesota Legislature was the legislature of the U.S. state of Minnesota from January 3, 2017 to January 7, 2019. It was composed of the Senate and the House of Representatives, based on the results of the 2016 Senate election and the 2016 House election. It first convened and held its regular session in Saint Paul from January 3 to May 22, 2017, and from February 20 to May 20, 2018. A special session to complete unfinished business was held from May 23 to 26, 2017.

== Major events ==
- January 23, 2017: Governor Mark Dayton delivered his 2017 State of the State address in a joint session. Near the end of his speech, Dayton collapsed and was attended to by, among others, state senators and physicians Scott Jensen and Matt Klein.
- February 22, 2017: A joint session was held to elect regents of the University of Minnesota.
- March 14, 2018: Governor Dayton delivered his 2018 State of the State address in a joint session.
- May 10, 2018: A joint session was held to elect a regent of the University of Minnesota.

== Major legislation ==
=== Enacted ===
- January 26, 2017: Health insurance premium subsidy act (Laws 2017, chapter 2)
- March 7, 2017: Off-sale intoxicating liquor sales on Sunday act (Laws 2017, chapter 6)
- April 4, 2017: Reinsurance act (Laws 2017, chapter 13)
- May 18, 2017: Real ID implementation act (Laws 2017, chapter 76)
- Omnibus appropriations acts:
  - May 30, 2017: Omnibus agriculture act (Laws 2017, chapter 88)
  - May 30, 2017: Omnibus higher education act (Laws 2017, chapter 89)
  - May 30, 2017: Omnibus environment and natural resources act (Laws 2017, chapter 93)
  - May 30, 2017: Omnibus jobs, economic development, and energy act (Laws 2017, chapter 94)
  - May 30, 2017: Omnibus judiciary and public safety act (Laws 2017, chapter 95)
  - May 30, 2017: Omnibus transportation act (Laws 2017, First Special Session chapter 3)
  - May 30, 2017: Omnibus state government act (Laws 2017, First Special Session chapter 4)
    - Two appropriations line-item vetoed.
  - May 30, 2017: Omnibus education act (Laws 2017, First Special Session chapter 5)
  - May 30, 2017: Omnibus health and human services act (Laws 2017, First Special Session chapter 6)
- May 30, 2017: Omnibus legacy act (Laws 2017, chapter 91)
- May 30, 2017: Environment and natural resources trust fund appropriations act (Laws 2017, chapter 96)
- May 30, 2017: Omnibus tax act (Laws 2017, First Special Session chapter 1)
- May 30, 2017: Omnibus capital investment "bonding" act (Laws 2017, First Special Session chapter 8)
- February 26, 2018: Legislative appropriations act (Laws 2018, chapter 100)
- March 22, 2018: Minnesota Licensing and Registration System supplemental appropriations act (Laws 2018, chapter 101)
- April 26, 2018: Service animal misrepresentation act (Laws 2018, chapter 106)
- May 29, 2018: Outdoor heritage fund appropriations act (Laws 2018, chapter 208)
- May 30, 2018: Omnibus capital investment "bonding" act (Laws 2018, chapter 214)
  - One appropriation line-item vetoed.
- May 31, 2018: Omnibus public pensions act (Laws 2018, chapter 211)

=== Proposed ===
Boldface indicates the bill was passed by its house of origin.

- Academic balance policy bill (H.F. No. 3739/S.F. No. 2487)
- Cell phone use while driving bill (H.F. No. 1180/S.F. No. 837)
- Civil liability for public safety response costs bill (H.F. No. 322/S.F. No. 679)
- Defense of dwelling and person bill (H.F. No. 238/S.F. No. 292)
- Female genital mutilation bill (**H.F. No. 2621**/S.F. No. 2355)
- Firearm permit to carry repeal bill (H.F. No. 188/S.F. No. 650)
- Firearm transfer background check bill (H.F. No. 1669/S.F. No. 1261)
- Gun violence protective order bill (H.F. No. 1605/S.F. No. 1262)
- K–12 education scholarship donation tax credit bill (H.F. No. 386/S.F. No. 256)
- Medical Assistance work requirement bill (H.F. No. 3722/S.F. No. 3611)
- Minnesota African American Family Preservation Act (H.F. No. 3973/S.F. No. 3779)
- Opioid addiction prevention and treatment bill (H.F. No. 1440/**S.F. No. 730**)
- Proposed constitutional amendment allowing recreational marijuana bill (H.F. No. 926)
- Proposed constitutional amendment dedicating motor vehicle parts sales tax revenue to roads and bridges bill (**H.F. No. 4437**/S.F. No. 3837)
- Recreational marijuana bill (H.F. No. 927/S.F. No. 1320)
- Semiautomatic assault weapon minimum possession age bill (H.F. No. 3516/S.F. No. 2953)
- Sexual harassment bill (H.F. No. 4459/S.F. No. 4031)
- Uniform State Labor Standards Act (**H.F. No. 600**/S.F. No. 580)

==== Vetoed ====
Boldface indicates the act was passed by both houses.

===== 2017 =====
- May 10, 2017: Abortion public funding prohibition act (**H.F. No. 809**/S.F. No. 702)
- May 10, 2017: Abortion facility license act (**H.F. No. 812**/S.F. No. 704)
- Omnibus appropriations acts:
  - May 12, 2017: Omnibus agriculture act (H.F. No. 895/**S.F. No. 780**)
  - May 12, 2017: Omnibus environment and natural resources act (**H.F. No. 888**/S.F. No. 723)
  - May 12, 2017: Omnibus education act (**H.F. No. 890**/S.F. No. 718)
  - May 12, 2017: Omnibus state government act (H.F. No. 691/**S.F. No. 605**)
  - May 12, 2017: Omnibus health and human services act (H.F. No. 945/**S.F. No. 800**)
  - May 15, 2017: Omnibus transportation act (**H.F. No. 861**/S.F. No. 1060)
  - May 15, 2017: Omnibus judiciary and public safety act (H.F. No. 896/**S.F. No. 803**)
  - May 15, 2017: Omnibus jobs, economic development, and energy act (H.F. No. 2209/**S.F. No. 1937**)
  - May 15, 2017: Omnibus higher education act (H.F. No. 2477/**S.F. No. 2214**)
- May 15, 2017: Omnibus tax act (**H.F. No. 4**/S.F. No. 2255)
- May 18, 2017: Teacher licensing act (**H.F. No. 140**/S.F. No. 4)

===== 2017, 1st Special Session =====
- May 30, 2017: Omnibus labor act (H.F. No. 4/**S.F. No. 3**)

===== 2018 =====
- May 17, 2018: Omnibus tax act (**H.F. No. 4385**/S.F. No. 3982)
- May 19, 2018: Obstruction of freeways act (**H.F. No. 390**/S.F. No. 676)
- May 23, 2018: Omnibus supplemental appropriations act (H.F. No. 4099/**S.F. No. 3656**)
- May 23, 2018: Omnibus tax act (**H.F. No. 947**/S.F. No. 945)
- May 30, 2018: Metropolitan Council act (H.F. No. 3273/**S.F. No. 2809**)

== Summary of actions ==
In this Legislature, all acts were approved (signed) by Governor Mark Dayton, with the notable exceptions of H.F. No. 809, an act that would have prohibited public funding of abortions; H.F. No. 812, an act that would have required facilities that perform abortions to be licensed; the first set of acts appropriating money for the state budget; H.F. No. 4, the first 2017 omnibus tax act; H.F. No. 140, an act that would have changed how public school teachers are licensed; 2017, First Special Session S.F. No. 3, an act that would notably have prohibited local governments from setting a higher minimum wage and requiring greater benefits for private sector employees than what is required by state law; H.F. No. 4385, the first 2018 omnibus tax act; H.F. No. 390, an act that would have increased penalties for obstructing freeways, airport public roadways, and interfering with public transit; S.F. No. 3656, the omnibus supplemental appropriations act; H.F. No. 947, the second 2018 omnibus tax act; and S.F. No. 2809, an act that would have changed the composition of the Metropolitan Council from gubernatorial appointees to county and city elected officials—all of which were vetoed. In Laws 2017, First Special Session chapter 4, the omnibus state government appropriations act, two appropriations for the Senate and the House of Representatives were line-item vetoed. Chapter 13, the reinsurance act, became law without the governor's signature.

In total, 33 acts were vetoed, three items of appropriation in two acts were line-item vetoed, and two acts became law without the governor's signature. No acts or items were enacted by the Legislature over the governor's veto. After the adjournment of the 2017, First Special Session—legislative leaders sued Governor Dayton over the validity of his line-item vetoes for legislative appropriations. The ensuing court case, Ninetieth Minnesota State Senate v. Dayton, proceeded to the Minnesota Supreme Court; the Court upheld the governor's vetoes.

== Political composition ==
Resignations and new members are discussed in the "Changes in membership" section below.

=== Senate ===
Final Senate composition 34 Republican 32 DFL 1 Vacant

	Party (Shading indicates majority caucus)		Total	Vacant
	Republican	Democratic– Farmer–Labor	Total	Vacant
End of the previous Legislature	28	38	66	1
Begin (January 3, 2017)	34	33	67	0
December 15, 2017	34	32	66	1
February 20, 2018	34	33	67	0
May 25, 2018	33	33	66	1
December 11, 2018	34	33	67	0
January 3, 2019	34	32	66	1
Final voting share	51.5%	48.5%		
Beginning of the next Legislature	34	32	66	1

=== House of Representatives ===
Final House composition 75 Republican 55 DFL 4 Vacant

	Party (Shading indicates majority caucus)		Total	Vacant
	Republican	Democratic– Farmer–Labor	Total	Vacant
End of the previous Legislature	73	61	134	0
Begin (January 3, 2017)	76	57	133	1
February 21, 2017	77	57	134	0
November 30, 2017	76	57	133	1
February 20, 2018	77	57	134	0
April 20, 2018	77	56	133	1
July 2, 2018	76	56	132	2
September 5, 2018	76	55	131	3
December 10, 2018	75	55	130	4
Final voting share	57.7%	42.3%		
Beginning of the next Legislature	59	75	134	0

== Leadership ==
=== Senate ===
- President: Michelle Fischbach (R), until May 25, 2018
- President pro tempore: Warren Limmer (R)

==== Majority (Republican) leadership ====
- Majority Leader: Paul Gazelka
- Deputy Majority Leaders:
  - Michelle Benson
  - Jeremy Miller
- Assistant Majority Leaders:
  - Gary Dahms
  - Bill Ingebrigtsen
  - Warren Limmer
  - Eric Pratt

==== Minority (DFL) leadership ====
- Minority Leader: Tom Bakk
- Assistant Minority Leaders:
  - Jeff Hayden, from January 5, 2017
  - Susan Kent, from January 5, 2017
  - Carolyn Laine, from January 24, 2017
- Minority Whips:
  - Kent Eken, from January 24, 2017
  - John Hoffman, from January 24, 2017
  - Ann Rest, from January 24, 2017

=== House of Representatives ===
- Speaker: Kurt Daudt (R)
- Speaker pro tempore: Tony Albright (R)

==== Majority (Republican) leadership ====
- Majority Leader: Joyce Peppin, until July 2, 2018
- Majority Whip: Ron Kresha
- Assistant Majority Leaders:
  - Dan Fabian
  - Kelly Fenton
  - Randy Jessup
  - Jim Nash
  - Marion O'Neill
  - Roz Peterson

==== Minority (DFL) leadership ====
- Minority Leader: Melissa Hortman
- Deputy Minority Leaders:
  - Jon Applebaum
  - Paul Marquart
  - Rena Moran
- Assistant Minority Leaders:
  - Rob Ecklund
  - Mike Freiberg
  - Laurie Halverson
  - Ben Lien
  - Ilhan Omar
  - Dave Pinto

== Members ==
=== Senate ===
Senate districts Republican DFL Vacant

District	Name	Party	Residence	First elected
1	Mark Johnson	Republican	East Grand Forks	2016
2	Paul Utke	Republican	Park Rapids	2016
3	Tom Bakk	DFL	Cook	2002
4	Kent Eken	DFL	Twin Valley	2012
5	Justin Eichorn	Republican	Grand Rapids	2016
6	David Tomassoni	DFL	Chisholm	2000
7	Erik Simonson	DFL	Duluth	2016
8	Bill Ingebrigtsen	Republican	Alexandria	2006
9	Paul Gazelka	Republican	Nisswa	2010
10	Carrie Ruud	Republican	Breezy Point	2002 (Note: Lost re-election in 2006. Elected again in 2012.)
11	Tony Lourey (Note: Until January 3, 2019)	DFL	Kerrick	2006
12	Torrey Westrom	Republican	Elbow Lake	2012
13	Michelle Fischbach (Note: Until May 25, 2018.)	Republican	Paynesville	1996 (Note: Elected in a special election.)
13	Jeff Howe (Note: From December 11, 2018.)	Republican	Rockville	2018
14	Jerry Relph	Republican	St. Cloud	2016
15	Andrew Mathews	Republican	Milaca	2016
16	Gary Dahms	Republican	Redwood Falls	2010
17	Andrew Lang	Republican	Olivia	2016
18	Scott Newman	Republican	Hutchinson	2010
19	Nick Frentz	DFL	North Mankato	2016
20	Rich Draheim	Republican	Madison Lake	2016
21	Mike Goggin	Republican	Red Wing	2016
22	Bill Weber	Republican	Luverne	2012
23	Julie Rosen	Republican	Vernon Center	2002
24	John Jasinski	Republican	Faribault	2016
25	Dave Senjem	Republican	Rochester	2002
26	Carla Nelson	Republican	Rochester	2010
27	Dan Sparks	DFL	Austin	2002
28	Jeremy Miller	Republican	Winona	2010
29	Bruce Anderson	Republican	Buffalo	2012
30	Mary Kiffmeyer	Republican	Big Lake	2012
31	Michelle Benson	Republican	Ham Lake	2010
32	Mark Koran	Republican	North Branch	2016
33	David Osmek	Republican	Mound	2012
34	Warren Limmer	Republican	Maple Grove	1995
35	Jim Abeler	Republican	Anoka	2016
36	John Hoffman	DFL	Champlin	2012
37	Jerry Newton	DFL	Coon Rapids	2016
38	Roger Chamberlain	Republican	Lino Lakes	2010
39	Karin Housley	Republican	St. Marys Point	2012
40	Chris Eaton	DFL	Brooklyn Center	2011
41	Carolyn Laine	DFL	Columbia Heights	2016
42	Jason Isaacson	DFL	Shoreview	2016
43	Chuck Wiger	DFL	Maplewood	1996
44	Paul Anderson	Republican	Plymouth	2016
45	Ann Rest	DFL	New Hope	2000
46	Ron Latz	DFL	St. Louis Park	2006
47	Scott Jensen	Republican	Chaska	2016
48	Steve Cwodzinski	DFL	Eden Prairie	2016
49	Melisa Franzen	DFL	Edina	2012
50	Melissa Halvorson Wiklund	DFL	Bloomington	2012
51	Jim Carlson	DFL	Eagan	2006 (Note: Lost re-election 2010. Elected again in 2012.)
52	Matt Klein	DFL	Mendota Heights	2016
53	Susan Kent	DFL	Woodbury	2012
54	Dan Schoen (Note: Until December 15, 2017.)	DFL	St. Paul Park	2016
54	Karla Bigham (Note: From February 20, 2018.)	DFL	Cottage Grove	2018
55	Eric Pratt	Republican	Prior Lake	2012
56	Dan Hall	Republican	Burnsville	2010
57	Greg Clausen	DFL	Apple Valley	2012
58	Matt Little	DFL	Lakeville	2016
59	Bobby Joe Champion	DFL	Minneapolis	2012
60	Kari Dziedzic	DFL	Minneapolis	2012
61	Scott Dibble	DFL	Minneapolis	2002
62	Jeff Hayden	DFL	Minneapolis	2011
63	Patricia Torres Ray	DFL	Minneapolis	2006
64	Dick Cohen	DFL	Saint Paul	1986
65	Sandy Pappas	DFL	Saint Paul	1990
66	John Marty	DFL	Roseville	1986
67	Foung Hawj	DFL	Saint Paul	2012

=== House of Representatives ===
House districts Republican DFL Vacant

District		Name	Party	Residence	First elected
1	A	Dan Fabian	Republican	Roseau	2010
1	B	Deb Kiel	Republican	Crookston	2010
2	A	Matt Grossell	Republican	Bagley	2016
2	B	Steve Green	Republican	Fosston	2012
3	A	Rob Ecklund	DFL	International Falls	2015 (Note: Elected in a special election.)
3	B	Mary Murphy	DFL	Hermantown	1976
4	A	Ben Lien	DFL	Moorhead	2012
4	B	Paul Marquart	DFL	Dilworth	2000
5	A	Matt Bliss	Republican	Pennington	2016
5	B	Sandy Layman	Republican	Cohasset	2016
6	A	Julie Sandstede	DFL	Hibbing	2016
6	B	Jason Metsa	DFL	Virginia	2012
7	A	Jennifer Schultz	DFL	Duluth	2014
7	B	Liz Olson	DFL	Duluth	2016
8	A	Bud Nornes	Republican	Fergus Falls	1996
8	B	Mary Franson	Republican	Alexandria	2010
9	A	John Poston	Republican	Lake Shore	2016
9	B	Ron Kresha	Republican	Little Falls	2012
10	A	Josh Heintzeman	Republican	Nisswa	2014
10	B	Dale Lueck	Republican	Aitkin	2014
11	A	Mike Sundin	DFL	Esko	2012
11	B	Jason Rarick	Republican	Pine City	2014
12	A	Jeff Backer	Republican	Browns Valley	2014
12	B	Paul Anderson	Republican	Starbuck	2008
13	A	Jeff Howe (Note: Until December 10, 2018.)	Republican	Rockville	2012
13	B	Tim O'Driscoll	Republican	Sartell	2010
14	A	Tama Theis	Republican	St. Cloud	2013
14	B	Jim Knoblach	Republican	St. Cloud	1994 (Note: Did not seek re-election in 2006. Elected again in 2014.)
15	A	Sondra Erickson	Republican	Princeton	1998 (Note: Elected in a special election. Lost re-election in 2008. Elected again in 2010.)
15	B	Jim Newberger	Republican	Becker	2012
16	A	Chris Swedzinski	Republican	Ghent	2010
16	B	Paul Torkelson	Republican	Hanska	2008
17	A	Tim Miller	Republican	Prinsburg	2014
17	B	Dave Baker	Republican	Willmar	2014
18	A	Dean Urdahl	Republican	Grove City	2002
18	B	Glenn Gruenhagen	Republican	Glencoe	2010
19	A	Clark Johnson	DFL	North Mankato	2013
19	B	Jack Considine	DFL	Mankato	2014
20	A	Bob Vogel	Republican	Elko New Market	2014
20	B	David Bly	DFL	Northfield	2006 (Note: Lost re-election in 2010. Elected again in 2012.)
21	A	Barb Haley	Republican	Red Wing	2016
21	B	Steve Drazkowski	Republican	Mazeppa	2007
22	A	Joe Schomacker	Republican	Luverne	2010
22	B	Rod Hamilton	Republican	Mountain Lake	2004
23	A	Bob Gunther	Republican	Fairmont	1995
23	B	Tony Cornish (Note: Until November 30, 2017.)	Republican	Vernon Center	2002
23	B	Jeremy Munson (Note: From February 20, 2018.)	Republican	Lake Crystal	2018
24	A	John Petersburg	Republican	Waseca	2012
24	B	Brian Daniels	Republican	Faribault	2014
25	A	Duane Quam	Republican	Byron	2010
25	B	Duane Sauke	DFL	Rochester	2016
26	A	Tina Liebling	DFL	Rochester	2004
26	B	Nels Pierson	Republican	Rochester	2014
27	A	Peggy Bennett	Republican	Albert Lea	2014
27	B	Jeanne Poppe	DFL	Austin	2004
28	A	Gene Pelowski	DFL	Winona	1986
28	B	Greg Davids	Republican	Preston	1991 (Note: Elected in a special election. Lost re-election in 2006. Elected again in 2008.)
29	A	Joe McDonald	Republican	Delano	2010
29	B	Marion O'Neill	Republican	Maple Lake	2012
30	A	Nick Zerwas	Republican	Elk River	2012
30	B	Eric Lucero	Republican	Dayton	2014
31	A	Kurt Daudt	Republican	Crown	2010
31	B	Cal Bahr	Republican	East Bethel	2016
32	A	Brian Johnson	Republican	Cambridge	2012
32	B	Anne Neu (Note: From February 21, 2017.)	Republican	North Branch	2017
33	A	Jerry Hertaus	Republican	Greenfield	2012
33	B	Cindy Pugh	Republican	Chanhassen	2012
34	A	Joyce Peppin (Note: Until July 2, 2018.)	Republican	Rogers	2004
34	B	Dennis Smith	Republican	Maple Grove	2014
35	A	Abigail Whelan	Republican	Anoka	2014
35	B	Peggy Scott	Republican	Andover	2008
36	A	Mark Uglem	Republican	Champlin	2012
36	B	Melissa Hortman	DFL	Brooklyn Park	2004
37	A	Erin Koegel	DFL	Spring Lake Park	2016
37	B	Nolan West	Republican	Blaine	2016
38	A	Linda Runbeck	Republican	Circle Pines	1989 (Note: Elected in a special election. Did not seek re-election in 1992 in order to seek election to the Minnesota Senate. Did not seek re-election to the Senate in 2000. Elected again to the House in 2010.)
38	B	Matt Dean	Republican	Dellwood	2004
39	A	Bob Dettmer	Republican	Forest Lake	2006
39	B	Kathy Lohmer	Republican	Stillwater	2010
40	A	Mike Nelson	DFL	Brooklyn Park	2002
40	B	Debra Hilstrom	DFL	Brooklyn Center	2000
41	A	Connie Bernardy	DFL	Fridley	2000 (Note: Did not seek re-election in 2006. Elected again in 2012.)
41	B	Mary Kunesh-Podein	DFL	New Brighton	2016
42	A	Randy Jessup	Republican	Shoreview	2016
42	B	Jamie Becker-Finn	DFL	Roseville	2016
43	A	Peter Fischer	DFL	Maplewood	2012
43	B	Leon Lillie	DFL	North St. Paul	2004
44	A	Sarah Anderson	Republican	Plymouth	2006
44	B	Jon Applebaum	DFL	Minnetonka	2014
45	A	Lyndon Carlson	DFL	Crystal	1972
45	B	Mike Freiberg	DFL	Golden Valley	2012
46	A	Peggy Flanagan	DFL	St. Louis Park	2015
46	B	Cheryl Youakim	DFL	Hopkins	2014
47	A	Jim Nash	Republican	Waconia	2014
47	B	Joe Hoppe	Republican	Chaska	2002
48	A	Laurie Pryor	DFL	Minnetonka	2016
48	B	Jenifer Loon	Republican	Eden Prairie	2008
49	A	Dario Anselmo	Republican	Edina	2016
49	B	Paul Rosenthal (Note: Until September 5, 2018.)	DFL	Edina	2008
50	A	Linda Slocum	DFL	Richfield	2006
50	B	Andrew Carlson	DFL	Bloomington	2016
51	A	Sandra Masin	DFL	Eagan	2006
51	B	Laurie Halverson	DFL	Eagan	2012
52	A	Rick Hansen	DFL	South St. Paul	2004
52	B	Regina Barr	Republican	Inver Grove Heights	2016
53	A	JoAnn Ward	DFL	Woodbury	2012
53	B	Kelly Fenton	Republican	Woodbury	2014
54	A	Keith Franke	Republican	St. Paul Park	2016
54	B	Tony Jurgens	Republican	Cottage Grove	2016
55	A	Bob Loonan	Republican	Shakopee	2014
55	B	Tony Albright	Republican	Prior Lake	2012
56	A	Drew Christensen	Republican	Savage	2014
56	B	Roz Peterson	Republican	Lakeville	2014
57	A	Erin Maye Quade	DFL	Apple Valley	2016
57	B	Anna Wills	Republican	Apple Valley	2012
58	A	Jon Koznick	Republican	Lakeville	2014
58	B	Pat Garofalo	Republican	Farmington	2004
59	A	Fue Lee	DFL	Minneapolis	2016
59	B	Raymond Dehn	DFL	Minneapolis	2012
60	A	Diane Loeffler	DFL	Minneapolis	2004
60	B	Ilhan Omar	DFL	Minneapolis	2016
61	A	Frank Hornstein	DFL	Minneapolis	2002
61	B	Paul Thissen (Note: Until April 20, 2018.)	DFL	Minneapolis	2002
62	A	Karen Clark	DFL	Minneapolis	1980
62	B	Susan Allen	DFL	Minneapolis	2012
63	A	Jim Davnie	DFL	Minneapolis	2000
63	B	Jean Wagenius	DFL	Minneapolis	1986
64	A	Erin Murphy	DFL	Saint Paul	2006
64	B	Dave Pinto	DFL	Saint Paul	2014
65	A	Rena Moran	DFL	Saint Paul	2010
65	B	Carlos Mariani	DFL	Saint Paul	1990
66	A	Alice Hausman	DFL	Saint Paul	1989
66	B	John Lesch	DFL	Saint Paul	2002
67	A	Tim Mahoney	DFL	Saint Paul	1998
67	B	Sheldon Johnson	DFL	Saint Paul	2000

== Changes in membership ==
=== Senate ===
District	Vacated by	Reason for change	Successor	Date successor seated
54	Dan Schoen (DFL)	Resigned effective December 15, 2017. A special election was held on February 12, 2018.	Karla Bigham (DFL)	February 20, 2018
13	Michelle Fischbach (R)	Resigned effective May 25, 2018. A special election was held on November 6, 2018.	Jeff Howe (R)	December 11, 2018
11	Tony Lourey (DFL)	Resigned effective January 3, 2019.	See 91st Minnesota Legislature.	

=== House of Representatives ===
District	Vacated by	Reason for change	Successor	Date successor seated
32B	Bob Barrett (R)	Ineligible for re-election. A special election was held on February 14, 2017.	Anne Neu (R)	February 21, 2017
23B	Tony Cornish (R)	Resigned effective November 30, 2017. A special election was held on February 12, 2018.	Jeremy Munson (R)	February 20, 2018
61B	Paul Thissen (DFL)	Resigned effective April 20, 2018.	A special election was not required.	
34A	Joyce Peppin (R)	Resigned effective July 2, 2018.	A special election was not required.	
49B	Paul Rosenthal (DFL)	Resigned effective September 5, 2018.	A special election was not required.	
13A	Jeff Howe (R)	Resigned effective December 10, 2018, to assume Senate seat.	A special election was not required.	

== Committees ==
=== Senate ===
Committee		Chair	Vice Chair	DFL Lead
Aging and Long-Term Care Policy		Karin Housley	Jerry Relph	Kent Eken
Agriculture, Rural Development, and Housing Finance		Torrey Westrom	Mark Johnson	Kari Dziedzic
Agriculture, Rural Development, and Housing Policy		Bill Weber	Mike Goggin	Foung Hawj
Capital Investment		Dave Senjem	Bill Ingebrigtsen	Sandy Pappas
Commerce and Consumer Protection Finance and Policy		Gary Dahms	Karin Housley	Dan Sparks
E–12 Education Finance		Carla Nelson	Eric Pratt (Note: Until February 28, 2018.)	Chuck Wiger
E–12 Education Finance		Carla Nelson	Gary Dahms (Note: From February 28, 2018.)	Chuck Wiger
E–12 Education Policy		Eric Pratt	Justin Eichorn	Susan Kent
Energy and Utilities Finance and Policy		David Osmek	Andrew Mathews	John Marty
Environment and Natural Resources Finance		Bill Ingebrigtsen	Carrie Ruud	David Tomassoni
Environment and Natural Resources Policy and Legacy Finance		Carrie Ruud	Bill Weber	Chris Eaton
Finance		Julie Rosen	Michelle Fischbach (Note: Until May 25, 2018.)	Dick Cohen
Health and Human Services Finance and Policy		Michelle Benson	Scott Jensen	Tony Lourey (Note: Until January 3, 2019.)
Higher Education Finance and Policy		Michelle Fischbach	Rich Draheim	Greg Clausen
Human Services Reform Finance and Policy		Jim Abeler	Paul Utke	Jeff Hayden
Jobs and Economic Growth Finance and Policy		Jeremy Miller	Paul Anderson	Bobby Joe Champion
Judiciary and Public Safety Finance and Policy		Warren Limmer	Dan Hall	Ron Latz
Local Government		Dan Hall	Bruce Anderson	Patricia Torres Ray
Rules and Administration		Paul Gazelka	Michelle Benson	Tom Bakk
Subcommittees	Committees	Paul Gazelka		
Subcommittees	Conference Committees	Paul Gazelka		
Subcommittees	Ethical Conduct	Michelle Fischbach		
Subcommittees	Litigation Expenses (Note: Established January 31, 2017.)	Scott Newman		
State Government Finance and Policy and Elections		Mary Kiffmeyer	Mark Koran	Jim Carlson
Taxes		Roger Chamberlain	Dave Senjem	Ann Rest
Transportation Finance and Policy		Scott Newman	John Jasinski	Scott Dibble
Veterans and Military Affairs Finance and Policy		Bruce Anderson	Andrew Lang	Jerry Newton
Select Committees
Health Care Consumer Access and Affordability (Note: Established May 22, 2017.)		Scott Jensen	Julie Rosen	Melissa Halvorson Wiklund

=== House of Representatives ===
Committee		Chair	Vice Chair	DFL Lead(s)
Agriculture Finance		Rod Hamilton	Tim Miller	Jeanne Poppe
Agriculture Policy		Paul Anderson	Jeff Backer	David Bly
Capital Investment		Dean Urdahl	Mark Uglem	Alice Hausman
Civil Law and Data Practices Policy		Peggy Scott	Dennis Smith	John Lesch
Commerce and Regulatory Reform		Joe Hoppe	Kelly Fenton	Linda Slocum
Education Finance		Jenifer Loon	Peggy Bennett	Jim Davnie
Education Innovation Policy		Sondra Erickson	Brian Daniels	Carlos Mariani
Environment and Natural Resources Policy and Finance		Dan Fabian	Josh Heintzeman	Rick Hansen
Subcommittee	Mining, Forestry, and Tourism	Chris Swedzinski	Dale Lueck	Jason Metsa
Ethics		Sondra Erickson		Mary Murphy
Government Operations and Elections Policy		Tim O'Driscoll	Cindy Pugh	Mike Nelson
Health and Human Services Finance		Matt Dean	Tony Albright	Erin Murphy
Health and Human Services Reform		Joe Schomacker	Glenn Gruenhagen	Tina Liebling
Subcommittees	Aging and Long-Term Care	Deb Kiel	Tama Theis	Susan Allen
Subcommittees	Childcare Access and Affordability	Mary Franson	Roz Peterson	Peggy Flanagan
Higher Education and Career Readiness Policy and Finance		Bud Nornes	Drew Christensen	Gene Pelowski
Job Growth and Energy Affordability Policy and Finance		Pat Garofalo	Jim Newberger	Karen Clark
Job Growth and Energy Affordability Policy and Finance		Pat Garofalo	Jim Newberger	Tim Mahoney
Job Growth and Energy Affordability Policy and Finance		Pat Garofalo	Jim Newberger	Jean Wagenius
Legacy Funding Finance		Bob Gunther	Sandy Layman	Leon Lillie
Public Safety and Security Policy and Finance		Tony Cornish (Note: Until November 9, 2017.)	Brian Johnson (Note: Until February 8, 2018.)	Debra Hilstrom
Public Safety and Security Policy and Finance		Brian Johnson (Note: From February 8, 2018.)	Kathy Lohmer (Note: From c. 2018.)	Debra Hilstrom
Rules and Legislative Administration		Joyce Peppin (Note: Until July 2, 2018.)	Dave Baker	Melissa Hortman
Subcommittee	Workplace Safety and Respect (Note: Established February 7, 2018.)	Joyce Peppin	Kelly Fenton	Melissa Hortman
State Government Finance		Sarah Anderson	Jim Nash	Sheldon Johnson
Division	Veterans Affairs	Bob Dettmer	Matt Bliss	Paul Rosenthal (Note: Until September 5, 2018.)
Taxes		Greg Davids	Joe McDonald	Paul Marquart
Division	Property Tax and Local Government Finance	Steve Drazkowski	Jerry Hertaus	Diane Loeffler
Transportation Finance		Paul Torkelson	John Petersburg	Frank Hornstein
Transportation and Regional Governance Policy		Linda Runbeck	Jon Koznick	Connie Bernardy
Ways and Means		Jim Knoblach	Bob Vogel	Lyndon Carlson
Select Committees
Technology and Responsive Government (Note: Established February 16, 2017.)		Dave Baker		

== Administrative officers ==
=== Senate ===
- Secretary: Cal Ludeman
- First Assistant Secretary: Colleen Pacheco
- Second Assistant Secretary: Mike Linn
- Third Assistant Secretary: Jessica Tupper
- Engrossing Secretary: Melissa Mapes
- Sergeant at Arms: Sven Lindquist
- Assistant Sergeant at Arms: Marilyn Logan
- Chaplain: Mike Smith (2017)

=== House of Representatives ===
- Chief Clerk: Patrick Murphy
- First Assistant Chief Clerk: Tim Johnson
- Second Assistant Chief Clerk: Gail Romanowski
- Desk Clerk: Marilee Davis
- Legislative Clerk: David Surdez
- Chief Sergeant at Arms: Bob Meyerson
- Assistant Sergeant at Arms: Erica Brynildson
- Assistant Sergeant at Arms: Andrew Olson
- Index Clerk: Carl Hamre

== Notes ==
Preceded by Eighty-ninth Minnesota Legislature	Ninetieth Minnesota Legislature; 2017–2018	Succeeded by Ninety-first Minnesota Legislature
