= 89th Minnesota Legislature =

2015 to 2016 legislative session

Eighty-ninth Minnesota Legislature
←	88th	90th	→
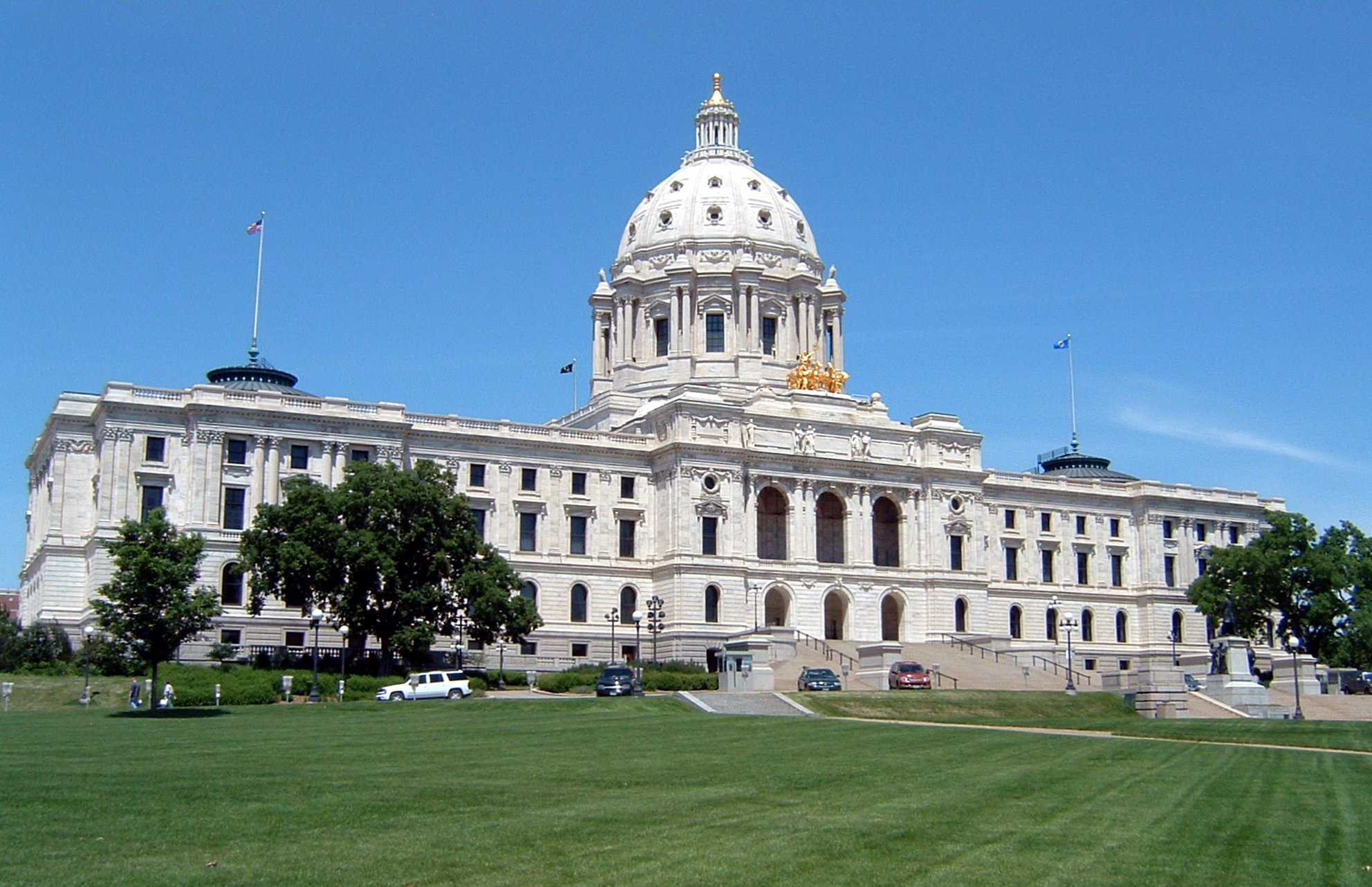
- Minnesota State Capitol

Overview
- Legislative body: Minnesota Legislature
- Term: January 6, 2015 – January 2, 2017
- Election: 2014 General Election

Senate
- Members: 67 senators
- President: Sandy Pappas (DFL)
- Majority Leader: Tom Bakk (DFL)
- Minority Leader: David Hann (R)
- Party control: Democratic–Farmer–Labor Party

House of Representatives
- Members: 134 representatives
- Speaker: Kurt Daudt (R)
- Majority Leader: Joyce Peppin (R)
- Minority Leader: Paul Thissen (DFL)
- Party control: Republican Party

Sessions
- 2015: January 6, 2015 – May 18, 2015
- 2016: March 8, 2016 – May 23, 2016

Special sessions
- 2015, 1st: June 12, 2015 – June 13, 2015

The Eighty-ninth Minnesota Legislature was the legislature of the U.S. state of Minnesota from January 6, 2015, to January 2, 2017. It was composed of the Senate and the House of Representatives, based on the results of the 2012 Senate election and the 2014 House election. The seats were apportioned based on the 2010 United States census. It first convened in Saint Paul on January 6, 2015, and last met on May 23, 2016. It held its regular session from January 6 to May 18, 2015, and from March 8 to May 23, 2016. A special session to complete unfinished business was held from June 12 to 13, 2015.

== Major events ==
- March 4, 2015: Joint session to elect regents of the University of Minnesota.
- April 9, 2015: 2015 State of the State Address
- March 9, 2016: 2016 State of the State Address

== Major legislation ==
=== Enacted ===
- March 17, 2015: Child protection act (Laws 2015, chapter 4)
- May 5, 2015: Right to Try Act (Laws 2015, chapter 15)
- May 22, 2015: Omnibus public safety act (Laws 2015, chapter 65)
- May 22, 2015: Omnibus higher education act (Laws 2015, chapter 69)
- May 22, 2015: Omnibus health and human services act (Laws 2015, chapter 71)
- May 22, 2015: Omnibus transportation act (Laws 2015, chapter 75)
- May 22, 2015: Environment and natural resources trust fund appropriations act (Laws 2015, chapter 76)
- May 23, 2015: Omnibus state government act (Laws 2015, chapter 77)
- June 13, 2015: Omnibus jobs, economic development, and energy act (Laws 2015, First Special Session chapter 1)
- June 13, 2015: Omnibus legacy act (Laws 2015, First Special Session chapter 2, see also H.F. No. 303)
- June 13, 2015: Omnibus education act (Laws 2015, First Special Session chapter 3)
- June 13, 2015: Omnibus agriculture, environment, and natural resources act (Laws 2015, First Special Session chapter 4)
- June 13, 2015: Omnibus capital investment (bonding) act (Laws 2015, First Special Session chapter 5)
- May 19, 2016: Nonconsensual dissemination of private sexual images and sexual solicitation act (Laws 2016, chapter 126)
- May 22, 2016: Controlled substances act (Laws 2016, chapter 160)
- May 22, 2016: Presidential primary election act (Laws 2016, chapter 162)
- May 31, 2016: Portable recording systems act (Laws 2016, chapter 171)
- May 31, 2016: Outdoor heritage fund appropriations act (Laws 2016, chapter 172)
- May 31, 2016: Environment and natural resources trust fund appropriations act (Laws 2016, chapter 186)
  - Seven appropriations line-item vetoed.
- June 1, 2016: Omnibus supplemental appropriations act (Laws 2016, chapter 189)

=== Proposed ===
Boldface indicates the bill was passed by its house of origin.

- Background checks for firearm transfers bill (H.F. No. 2897/S.F. No. 2493)
- Compassionate Care Act (H.F. No. 2095/S.F. No. 1880)
- Family leave insurance bill (H.F. No. 2963/S.F. No. 2558)
- Gender-specific accommodations bill (H.F. No. 3396/S.F. No. 3002)
- Minimum wage modification for tipped employees bill (**H.F. No. 1027**/S.F. No. 1941)
- MNsure governance bill (H.F. No. 1496/S.F. No. 139)
- Omnibus agriculture, environment, natural resources, jobs, economic development, and energy bill (H.F. No. 105/**S.F. No. 2101**)
- Omnibus agriculture, environment, natural resources, jobs, economic development, and energy bill (**H.F. No. 3931**)
- Omnibus capital investment (bonding) bill (**H.F. No. 622**/S.F. No. 1988)
- Omnibus capital investment (bonding) bill (H.F. No. 3146/S.F. No. 2839)
- Omnibus education policy bill (H.F. No. 1591/**S.F. No. 1495**)
- Omnibus education policy bill (H.F. No. 3066/**S.F. No. 2744**)
- Omnibus health, human services, state government, and public safety bill (**H.F. No. 3467**/S.F. No. 2501)
- Omnibus jobs, economic development, and energy bill (**H.F. No. 843**/S.F. No. 804)
- Omnibus transportation bill (**H.F. No. 4**/S.F. No. 1904)
- Real ID implementation bill (H.F. No. 3959/**S.F. No. 3589**)
- Teacher licensure and employment bill (**H.F. No. 2**/S.F. No. 473)
- Transportation finance bill (H.F. No. 600/S.F. No. 87)

==== Vetoed ====
- May 21, 2015: Omnibus education bill (**H.F. No. 844**/S.F. No. 811)
- May 23, 2015: Omnibus jobs, economic development, and energy bill (**H.F. No. 1437**)
- May 23, 2015: Omnibus agriculture, environment, and natural resources bill (**H.F. No. 846**/S.F. No. 1764)
- June 7, 2016: Omnibus tax bill (pocket veto) (**H.F. No. 848**/S.F. No. 826)

== Summary of actions ==
In this Legislature, all acts were approved (signed) by Governor Mark Dayton, with the exceptions of H.F. No. 844, an omnibus education bill; H.F. No. 846, an omnibus agriculture, environment, and natural resources bill; H.F. No. 1437, an omnibus jobs, economic development, and energy bill; and S.F. No. 588, an omnibus bill modifying state and local government employee retirement statutes, all of which were vetoed. In chapter 186, an environment and natural resources appropriations act, seven appropriations were line-item vetoed. H.F. No. 848, the omnibus tax bill, was pocket vetoed. No bills or items were enacted by the Legislature over the governor's veto.

== Political composition ==
Resignations and new members are discussed in the "Changes in membership" section below.

=== Senate ===
Senate composition 39 DFL 28 Republican

	Party (Shading indicates majority caucus)		Total	Vacant
	Democratic–Farmer–Labor	Republican	Total	Vacant
End of the previous Legislature	39	28	67	0
Begin	39	28	67	0
October 31, 2015	39	27	66	1
February 22, 2016	39	28	67	0
July 11, 2016	38	28	66	1
Final voting share	57.6%	42.4%		
Beginning of the next Legislature	33	34	67	0

=== House of Representatives ===
House composition (from February 17, 2016) 73 Republican 61 DFL

	Party (Shading indicates majority caucus)		Total	Vacant
	Republican	Democratic–Farmer–Labor	Total	Vacant
End of the previous Legislature	61	73	134	0
Begin	72	62	134	0
July 1, 2015	72	61	133	1
August 8, 2015	72	60	132	2
November 9, 2015	72	61	133	1
December 15, 2015	72	60	132	2
December 17, 2015	72	61	133	1
February 17, 2016	73	61	134	0
Final voting share	54.5%	45.5%		
Beginning of the next Legislature	76	57	133	1

== Leadership ==
=== Senate ===
- President: Sandy Pappas (DFL)
- President pro tempore: Ann Rest (DFL)

==== Majority (DFL) leadership ====
- Majority Leader: Tom Bakk
- Assistant Majority Leader: Katie Sieben
- Deputy Majority Leader: Jeff Hayden
- Majority Whips:
  - Chris Eaton
  - Lyle Koenen

==== Minority (Republican) leadership ====
- Minority Leader: David Hann
- Assistant Minority Leaders:
  - Michelle Benson
  - Gary Dahms
  - Paul Gazelka
  - Bill Ingebrigtsen
  - Warren Limmer
  - Carrie Ruud
- Minority Whip: David Osmek

=== House of Representatives ===
- Speaker: Kurt Daudt (R)
- Speaker pro tempore: Tim O'Driscoll (R)

==== Majority (Republican) leadership ====
- Majority Leader: Joyce Peppin
- Majority Whip: Dan Fabian
- Assistant Majority Leaders:
  - Dave Baker
  - Deb Kiel
  - Ron Kresha
  - Kathy Lohmer
  - Tim Sanders
  - Chris Swedzinski

==== Minority (DFL) leadership ====
- Minority Leader: Paul Thissen
- Deputy Minority Leaders:
  - Melissa Hortman
  - Paul Marquart
  - Erin Murphy

== Members ==
=== Senate ===
Senate districts by members' political party DFL Republican

District	Name	Party	Residence	First elected
1	LeRoy Stumpf	DFL	Plummer	1982
2	Rod Skoe	DFL	Clearbrook	2002
3	Tom Bakk	DFL	Cook	2002
4	Kent Eken	DFL	Twin Valley	2012
5	Tom Saxhaug	DFL	Grand Rapids	2002
6	David Tomassoni	DFL	Chisholm	2000
7	Roger Reinert	DFL	Duluth	2010
8	Bill Ingebrigtsen	Republican	Alexandria	2006
9	Paul Gazelka	Republican	Nisswa	2010
10	Carrie Ruud	Republican	Breezy Point	2002, 2012†
11	Tony Lourey	DFL	Kerrick	2006
12	Torrey Westrom	Republican	Elbow Lake	2012
13	Michelle Fischbach	Republican	Paynesville	1996*
14	John Pederson	Republican	St. Cloud	2010
15	Dave Brown	Republican	Becker	2010
16	Gary Dahms	Republican	Redwood Falls	2010
17	Lyle Koenen	DFL	Clara City	2012*
18	Scott Newman	Republican	Hutchinson	2010
19	Kathy Sheran	DFL	Mankato	2006
20	Kevin Dahle	DFL	Northfield	2008*, 2012†
21	Matt Schmit	DFL	Red Wing	2012
22	Bill Weber	Republican	Luverne	2012
23	Julie Rosen	Republican	Vernon Center	2002
24	Vicki Jensen	DFL	Owatonna	2012
25	Dave Senjem	Republican	Rochester	2002
26	Carla Nelson	Republican	Rochester	2010
27	Dan Sparks	DFL	Austin	2002
28	Jeremy Miller	Republican	Winona	2010
29	Bruce Anderson	Republican	Buffalo	2012
30	Mary Kiffmeyer	Republican	Big Lake	2012
31	Michelle Benson	Republican	Ham Lake	2010
32	Sean Nienow	Republican	Cambridge	2002, 2010†
33	David Osmek	Republican	Mound	2012
34	Warren Limmer	Republican	Maple Grove	1995*
35	Branden Petersen (until October 31, 2015)	Republican	Andover	2012
35	Jim Abeler (from February 22, 2016)	Republican	Anoka	2016*
36	John Hoffman	DFL	Champlin	2012
37	Alice Johnson	DFL	Spring Lake Park	2012
38	Roger Chamberlain	Republican	Lino Lakes	2010
39	Karin Housley	Republican	St. Marys Point	2012
40	Chris Eaton	DFL	Brooklyn Center	2011*
41	Barb Goodwin	DFL	Columbia Heights	2010
42	Bev Scalze	DFL	Little Canada	2012
43	Chuck Wiger	DFL	Maplewood	1996
44	Terri Bonoff	DFL	Minnetonka	2005*
45	Ann Rest	DFL	New Hope	2000
46	Ron Latz	DFL	St. Louis Park	2006
47	Julianne Ortman	Republican	Chanhassen	2002
48	David Hann	Republican	Eden Prairie	2002
49	Melisa Franzen	DFL	Edina	2012
50	Melissa Halvorson Wiklund	DFL	Bloomington	2012
51	Jim Carlson	DFL	Eagan	2006, 2012†
52	Jim Metzen (died July 11, 2016)	DFL	South St. Paul	1986
53	Susan Kent	DFL	Woodbury	2012
54	Katie Sieben	DFL	Newport	2006
55	Eric Pratt	Republican	Prior Lake	2012
56	Dan Hall	Republican	Burnsville	2010
57	Greg Clausen	DFL	Apple Valley	2012
58	Dave Thompson	Republican	Lakeville	2010
59	Bobby Joe Champion	DFL	Minneapolis	2012
60	Kari Dziedzic	DFL	Minneapolis	2012*
61	Scott Dibble	DFL	Minneapolis	2002
62	Jeff Hayden	DFL	Minneapolis	2011*
63	Patricia Torres Ray	DFL	Minneapolis	2006
64	Dick Cohen	DFL	Saint Paul	1986
65	Sandy Pappas	DFL	Saint Paul	1990
66	John Marty	DFL	Roseville	1986
67	Foung Hawj	DFL	Saint Paul	2012

*Elected in a special election.
†Elected to non-consecutive terms.

=== House of Representatives ===
House districts by members' political party (from February 17, 2016) Republican DFL

District	Name	Party	Residence	First elected
1A	Dan Fabian	Republican	Roseau	2010
1B	Deb Kiel	Republican	Crookston	2010
2A	Dave Hancock	Republican	Bemidji	2010, 2014†
2B	Steve Green	Republican	Fosston	2012
3A	David Dill (died August 8, 2015)	DFL	Crane Lake	2002
3A	Rob Ecklund (from December 17, 2015)	DFL	International Falls	2015*
3B	Mary Murphy	DFL	Hermantown	1976
4A	Ben Lien	DFL	Moorhead	2012
4B	Paul Marquart	DFL	Dilworth	2000
5A	John Persell	DFL	Bemidji	2008
5B	Tom Anzelc	DFL	Balsam Township	2006
6A	Carly Melin	DFL	Hibbing	2011*
6B	Jason Metsa	DFL	Virginia	2012
7A	Jennifer Schultz	DFL	Duluth	2014
7B	Erik Simonson	DFL	Duluth	2012
8A	Bud Nornes	Republican	Fergus Falls	1996
8B	Mary Franson	Republican	Alexandria	2010
9A	Mark Anderson	Republican	Lake Shore	2012
9B	Ron Kresha	Republican	Little Falls	2012
10A	Josh Heintzeman	Republican	Nisswa	2014
10B	Dale Lueck	Republican	Aitkin	2014
11A	Mike Sundin	DFL	Esko	2012
11B	Jason Rarick	Republican	Pine City	2014
12A	Jeff Backer	Republican	Browns Valley	2014
12B	Paul Anderson	Republican	Starbuck	2008
13A	Jeff Howe	Republican	Rockville	2012
13B	Tim O'Driscoll	Republican	Sartell	2010
14A	Tama Theis	Republican	St. Cloud	2013*
14B	Jim Knoblach	Republican	St. Cloud	1994, 2014†
15A	Sondra Erickson	Republican	Princeton	1998*, 2010†
15B	Jim Newberger	Republican	Becker	2012
16A	Chris Swedzinski	Republican	Ghent	2010
16B	Paul Torkelson	Republican	Hanska	2008
17A	Tim Miller	Republican	Prinsburg	2014
17B	Dave Baker	Republican	Willmar	2014
18A	Dean Urdahl	Republican	Grove City	2002
18B	Glenn Gruenhagen	Republican	Glencoe	2010
19A	Clark Johnson	DFL	North Mankato	2013*
19B	Jack Considine	DFL	Mankato	2014
20A	Bob Vogel	Republican	Elko New Market	2014
20B	David Bly	DFL	Northfield	2006, 2012†
21A	Tim Kelly	Republican	Red Wing	2008
21B	Steve Drazkowski	Republican	Mazeppa	2007*
22A	Joe Schomacker	Republican	Luverne	2010
22B	Rod Hamilton	Republican	Mountain Lake	2004
23A	Bob Gunther	Republican	Fairmont	1995*
23B	Tony Cornish	Republican	Vernon Center	2002
24A	John Petersburg	Republican	Waseca	2012
24B	Brian Daniels	Republican	Faribault	2014
25A	Duane Quam	Republican	Byron	2010
25B	Kim Norton	DFL	Rochester	2006
26A	Tina Liebling	DFL	Rochester	2004
26B	Nels Pierson	Republican	Rochester	2014
27A	Peggy Bennett	Republican	Albert Lea	2014
27B	Jeanne Poppe	DFL	Austin	2004
28A	Gene Pelowski	DFL	Winona	1986
28B	Greg Davids	Republican	Preston	1991*, 2008†
29A	Joe McDonald	Republican	Delano	2010
29B	Marion O'Neill	Republican	Maple Lake	2012
30A	Nick Zerwas	Republican	Elk River	2012
30B	Eric Lucero	Republican	Dayton	2014
31A	Kurt Daudt	Republican	Crown	2010
31B	Tom Hackbarth	Republican	Cedar	1994, 1998†
32A	Brian Johnson	Republican	Cambridge	2012
32B	Bob Barrett	Republican	Lindstrom	2010
33A	Jerry Hertaus	Republican	Greenfield	2012
33B	Cindy Pugh	Republican	Chanhassen	2012
34A	Joyce Peppin	Republican	Rogers	2004
34B	Dennis Smith	Republican	Maple Grove	2014
35A	Abigail Whelan	Republican	Anoka	2014
35B	Peggy Scott	Republican	Andover	2008
36A	Mark Uglem	Republican	Champlin	2012
36B	Melissa Hortman	DFL	Brooklyn Park	2004
37A	Jerry Newton	DFL	Coon Rapids	2008, 2012†
37B	Tim Sanders	Republican	Blaine	2008
38A	Linda Runbeck	Republican	Circle Pines	1989*, 2010†
38B	Matt Dean	Republican	Dellwood	2004
39A	Bob Dettmer	Republican	Forest Lake	2006
39B	Kathy Lohmer	Republican	Stillwater	2010
40A	Mike Nelson	DFL	Brooklyn Park	2002
40B	Debra Hilstrom	DFL	Brooklyn Center	2000
41A	Connie Bernardy	DFL	Fridley	2000, 2012†
41B	Carolyn Laine	DFL	Columbia Heights	2006
42A	Barb Yarusso	DFL	Shoreview	2012
42B	Jason Isaacson	DFL	Shoreview	2012
43A	Peter Fischer	DFL	Maplewood	2012
43B	Leon Lillie	DFL	North St. Paul	2004
44A	Sarah Anderson	Republican	Plymouth	2006
44B	Jon Applebaum	DFL	Minnetonka	2014
45A	Lyndon Carlson	DFL	Crystal	1972
45B	Mike Freiberg	DFL	Golden Valley	2012
46A	Ryan Winkler (until July 1, 2015)	DFL	St. Louis Park	2006
46A	Peggy Flanagan (from November 9, 2015)	DFL	St. Louis Park	2015*
46B	Cheryl Youakim	DFL	Hopkins	2014
47A	Jim Nash	Republican	Waconia	2014
47B	Joe Hoppe	Republican	Chaska	2002
48A	Yvonne Selcer	DFL	Minnetonka	2012
48B	Jenifer Loon	Republican	Eden Prairie	2008
49A	Ron Erhardt	DFL	Edina	1990, 2012†
49B	Paul Rosenthal	DFL	Edina	2008, 2012†
50A	Linda Slocum	DFL	Richfield	2006
50B	Ann Lenczewski (until December 15, 2015)	DFL	Bloomington	1998
50B	Chad Anderson (from February 17, 2016)	Republican	Bloomington	2016*
51A	Sandra Masin	DFL	Eagan	2006, 2012†
51B	Laurie Halverson	DFL	Eagan	2012
52A	Rick Hansen	DFL	South St. Paul	2004
52B	Joe Atkins	DFL	Inver Grove Heights	2002
53A	JoAnn Ward	DFL	Woodbury	2012
53B	Kelly Fenton	Republican	Woodbury	2014
54A	Dan Schoen	DFL	St. Paul Park	2012
54B	Denny McNamara	Republican	Hastings	2002
55A	Bob Loonan	Republican	Shakopee	2014
55B	Tony Albright	Republican	Prior Lake	2012
56A	Drew Christensen	Republican	Savage	2014
56B	Roz Peterson	Republican	Lakeville	2014
57A	Tara Mack	Republican	Apple Valley	2008
57B	Anna Wills	Republican	Apple Valley	2012
58A	Jon Koznick	Republican	Lakeville	2014
58B	Pat Garofalo	Republican	Farmington	2004
59A	Joe Mullery	DFL	Minneapolis	1996
59B	Raymond Dehn	DFL	Minneapolis	2012
60A	Diane Loeffler	DFL	Minneapolis	2004
60B	Phyllis Kahn	DFL	Minneapolis	1972
61A	Frank Hornstein	DFL	Minneapolis	2002
61B	Paul Thissen	DFL	Minneapolis	2002
62A	Karen Clark	DFL	Minneapolis	1980
62B	Susan Allen	DFL	Minneapolis	2012*
63A	Jim Davnie	DFL	Minneapolis	2000
63B	Jean Wagenius	DFL	Minneapolis	1986
64A	Erin Murphy	DFL	Saint Paul	2006
64B	Dave Pinto	DFL	Saint Paul	2014
65A	Rena Moran	DFL	Saint Paul	2010
65B	Carlos Mariani	DFL	Saint Paul	1990
66A	Alice Hausman	DFL	Saint Paul	1989*
66B	John Lesch	DFL	Saint Paul	2002
67A	Tim Mahoney	DFL	Saint Paul	1998
67B	Sheldon Johnson	DFL	Saint Paul	2000

*Elected in a special election.
†Elected to non-consecutive terms.

== Changes in membership ==
=== Senate ===
District	Vacated by	Reason for change	Successor	Date of successor's formal installation (Note: When seated or oath administered, not necessarily when service began.)
35	Branden Petersen (R)	Resigned effective October 31, 2015. A special election was held on February 9, 2016.	Jim Abeler (R)	February 22, 2016
52	Jim Metzen (DFL)	Died of lung cancer on July 11, 2016.	N/A	N/A

=== House of Representatives ===
District	Vacated by	Reason for change	Successor	Date of successor's formal installation
46A	Ryan Winkler (DFL)	Resigned effective July 1, 2015. A special election was held on November 3, 2015.	Peggy Flanagan (DFL)	November 9, 2015
3A	David Dill (DFL)	Died of cancer on August 8, 2015. A special election was held on December 8, 2015.	Rob Ecklund (DFL)	December 17, 2015
50B	Ann Lenczewski (DFL)	Resigned effective December 15, 2015, to join Lockridge Grindal Nauen P.L.L.P. A special election was held on February 9, 2016.	Chad Anderson (R)	February 17, 2016

== Committees ==
=== Senate ===
Committee			Chair(s)	Vice Chair	Republican Lead
Capital Investment			LeRoy Stumpf	Bev Scalze	Dave Senjem
Commerce			Jim Metzen (until July 11, 2016)	Vicki Jensen	Paul Gazelka
Subcommittee	Insurance Reform		Vicki Jensen		
Education			Chuck Wiger	Alice Johnson	Sean Nienow
Environment and Energy			John Marty	John Hoffman	David Osmek
Subcommittees	Fish and Wildlife		Matt Schmit		
Subcommittees	Lands		Foung Hawj		
Finance			Dick Cohen	Bobby Joe Champion	Michelle Fischbach
Divisions	E–12 Education		Chuck Wiger	Alice Johnson	Sean Nienow
Divisions	Environment and Energy (established February 29, 2016)		John Marty	John Hoffman	David Osmek
Divisions	Environment, Economic Development and Agriculture (dissolved February 29, 2016)		David Tomassoni	Foung Hawj	Bill Ingebrigtsen
Divisions	Health and Human Services		Tony Lourey	Melisa Franzen	Julie Rosen
Divisions	Higher Education and Workforce Development		Terri Bonoff	Greg Clausen	Jeremy Miller
Divisions	Judiciary		Ron Latz	Barb Goodwin	Warren Limmer
Divisions	Subdivision	Justice Programs (established February 25, 2015)	Bobby Joe Champion		
Divisions	Natural Resources, Economic Development and Agriculture (established February 29, 2016)		David Tomassoni	Foung Hawj	Bill Ingebrigtsen
Divisions	State Departments and Veterans		Tom Saxhaug	Jim Carlson	Roger Chamberlain
Divisions	Subdivision	Veterans and Military Affairs (established February 10, 2015)	Jim Carlson		Bruce Anderson
Divisions	Transportation and Public Safety		Scott Dibble	Susan Kent	John Pederson
Subcommittees	Equity (established March 30, 2016)		Bobby Joe Champion		
Subcommittees	Equity (established March 30, 2016)		Jeff Hayden		
Subcommittees	Legacy		Dick Cohen		
Health, Human Services and Housing			Kathy Sheran	Melissa Halvorson Wiklund	Michelle Benson
Higher Education and Workforce Development			Terri Bonoff	Greg Clausen	Jeremy Miller
Jobs, Agriculture and Rural Development			Dan Sparks	Matt Schmit	Gary Dahms
Judiciary			Ron Latz	Barb Goodwin	Warren Limmer
Rules and Administration			Tom Bakk	Katie Sieben	David Hann
Subcommittees	Committees		Tom Bakk		
Subcommittees	Conference Committees		Tom Bakk		
Subcommittees	Elections		Katie Sieben	Kent Eken	Mary Kiffmeyer
Subcommittees	Ethical Conduct		Sandy Pappas		
Subcommittees	Litigation Expenses		Dick Cohen		
Subcommittees	Permanent and Joint Rules		Tom Bakk		
Subcommittees	Personnel and Budget		Sandy Pappas		
State and Local Government			Patricia Torres Ray	Chris Eaton	Dan Hall
Taxes			Rod Skoe	Ann Rest	Julianne Ortman
Division	Tax Reform		Ann Rest	Lyle Koenen	Dave Thompson
Transportation and Public Safety			Scott Dibble	Susan Kent	John Pederson

=== House of Representatives ===
Committee		Chair	Vice Chair	DFL Lead(s)
Affordable Child Care (Select, established March 8, 2016)		Mary Franson		
Aging and Long-Term Care Policy		Joe Schomacker	Tama Theis	Leon Lillie
Agriculture Finance		Rod Hamilton	Deb Kiel	Jeanne Poppe
Agriculture Policy		Paul Anderson	Mary Franson	David Bly
Capital Investment		Paul Torkelson	Chris Swedzinski	Alice Hausman
Civil Law and Data Practices		Peggy Scott	Dennis Smith	John Lesch
Commerce and Regulatory Reform		Joe Hoppe	Tim O'Driscoll	Joe Atkins
Education Finance		Jenifer Loon	Ron Kresha	Mary Murphy
Education Innovation Policy		Sondra Erickson	Peggy Bennett	Carlos Mariani
Environment and Natural Resources Policy and Finance		Denny McNamara	Dan Fabian	Rick Hansen
Ethics		Sondra Erickson		Mary Murphy
Government Operations and Elections Policy		Tim Sanders	Cindy Pugh	Mike Nelson
Subcommittee	Metropolitan Council Accountability and Transparency	Linda Runbeck	Jim Nash	
Greater Minnesota Economic and Workforce Development Policy		Bob Gunther	Steve Green	Kim Norton
Health and Human Services Finance		Matt Dean	Joe McDonald	Tina Liebling (Health Care)
Health and Human Services Finance		Matt Dean	Joe McDonald	Diane Loeffler (Human Services)
Health and Human Services Reform		Tara Mack	Roz Peterson	Joe Mullery
Subcommittee	Licensing	Nick Zerwas		
Higher Education Policy and Finance		Bud Nornes	Marion O'Neill	Gene Pelowski
Job Growth and Energy Affordability Policy and Finance		Pat Garofalo	Dave Baker	Tim Mahoney (Jobs and Energy)
Job Growth and Energy Affordability Policy and Finance		Pat Garofalo	Dave Baker	Karen Clark (Housing)
Legacy Funding Finance		Dean Urdahl	Josh Heintzeman	Phyllis Kahn
Mining and Outdoor Recreation Policy		Tom Hackbarth	Dale Lueck	David Dill (until August 8, 2015)
Mining and Outdoor Recreation Policy		Tom Hackbarth	Dale Lueck	Tom Anzelc
Subcommittee	Lands	David Dill (until August 8, 2015)		
Public Safety and Crime Prevention Policy and Finance		Tony Cornish	Brian Johnson	Debra Hilstrom
Rules and Legislative Administration		Joyce Peppin	Kelly Fenton	Paul Thissen
State Government Finance		Sarah Anderson	Jeff Howe	Sheldon Johnson
Division	Veterans Affairs	Bob Dettmer	Dave Hancock	John Persell
Taxes		Greg Davids	Bob Barrett	Ann Lenczewski (until December 15, 2015)
Taxes		Greg Davids	Bob Barrett	Paul Marquart
Division	Property Tax and Local Government Finance	Steve Drazkowski	Duane Quam	Jim Davnie
Transportation Policy and Finance		Tim Kelly	John Petersburg	Ron Erhardt
Transportation Policy and Finance		Tim Kelly	John Petersburg	Frank Hornstein
Ways and Means		Jim Knoblach	Tony Albright	Lyndon Carlson

== Administrative officers ==
=== Senate ===
- Secretary: JoAnne Zoff
- First Assistant Secretary: Colleen Pacheco
- Second Assistant Secretary: Mike Linn
- Third Assistant Secretary: Jessica Tupper
- Engrossing Secretary: Melissa Mapes
- Sergeant at Arms: Sven Lindquist
- Assistant Sergeant at Arms: Marilyn Logan Hall
- Chaplain: Rev. Dennis Morreim

=== House of Representatives ===
- Chief Clerk: Patrick Murphy
- First Assistant Chief Clerk: Tim Johnson
- Second Assistant Chief Clerk: Gail Romanowski
- Desk Clerk: Marilee Davis
- Legislative Clerk: David Surdez
- Chief Sergeant at Arms: Bob Meyerson (from January 29, 2015)
- Assistant Sergeant at Arms: Erica Brynildson
- Assistant Sergeant at Arms: Andrew Olson
- Index Clerk: Carl Hamre

== Notes ==
Preceded by Eighty-eighth Minnesota Legislature	Eighty-ninth Minnesota Legislature; 2015—2016	Succeeded by Ninetieth Minnesota Legislature
