= 88th Minnesota Legislature =

2013–2014 US legislative session

Eighty-eighth Minnesota Legislature
←	87th	89th	→
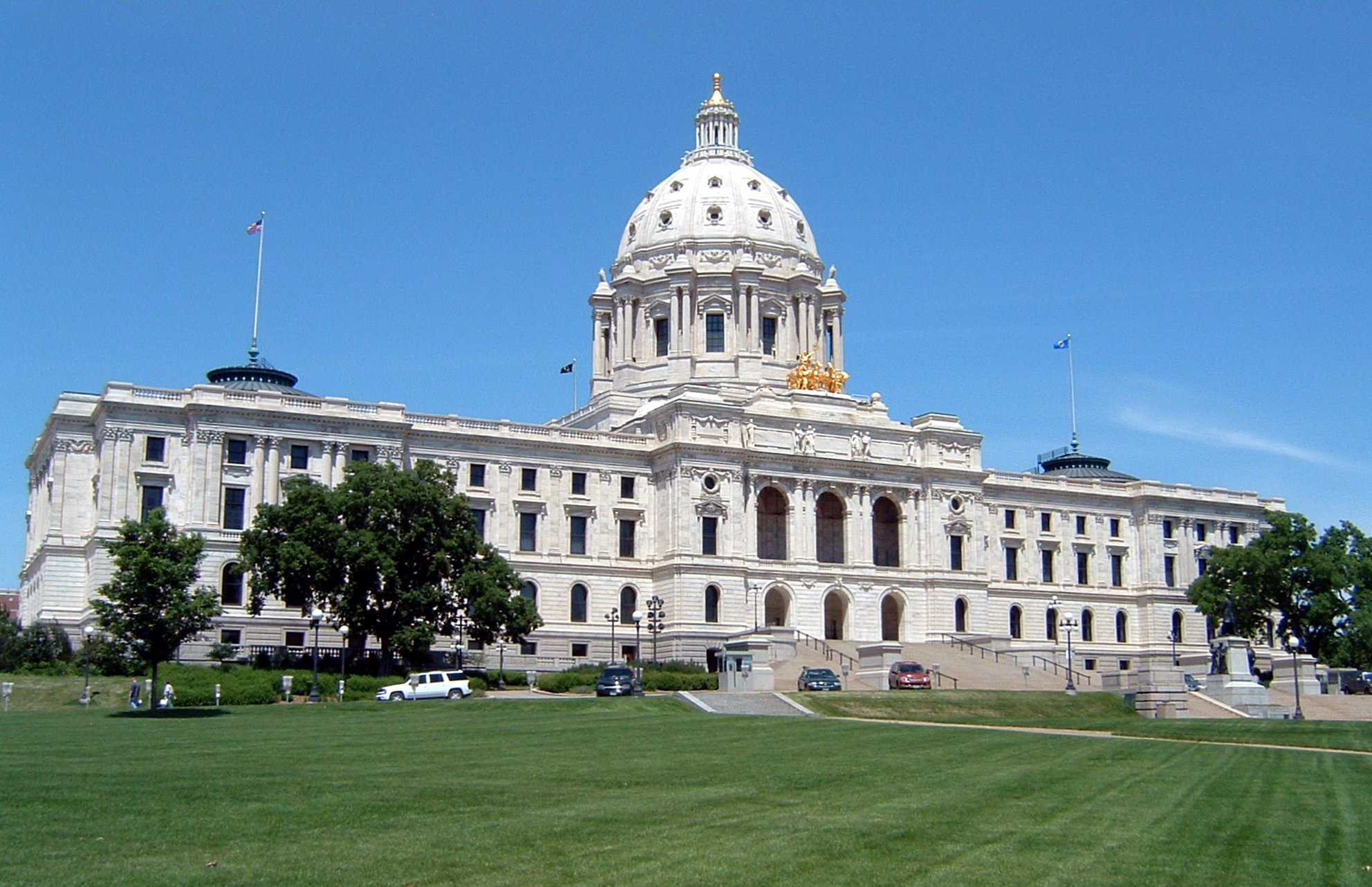
- Minnesota State Capitol

Overview
- Legislative body: Minnesota Legislature
- Term: January 8, 2013 – January 1, 2015
- Election: 2012 General Election

Senate
- Members: 67 senators
- President: Sandy Pappas (DFL)
- Majority Leader: Tom Bakk (DFL)
- Minority Leader: David Hann (R)
- Party control: Democratic–Farmer–Labor Party

House of Representatives
- Members: 134 representatives
- Speaker: Paul Thissen (DFL)
- Majority Leader: Erin Murphy (DFL)
- Minority Leader: Kurt Daudt (R)
- Party control: Democratic–Farmer–Labor Party

Sessions
- 2013: January 8, 2013 – May 20, 2013
- 2014: February 25, 2014 – May 16, 2014

Special sessions
- 2013, 1st: September 9, 2013

The Eighty-eighth Minnesota Legislature was the legislature of the U.S. state of Minnesota from January 8, 2013, to January 5, 2015. It was composed of the Senate and the House of Representatives, based on the results of the 2012 Senate election and the 2012 House election. The seats were apportioned based on the 2010 United States census. It first convened in Saint Paul on January 8, 2013 and last met on May 16, 2014. It held its regular session from January 8 to May 20, 2013, and from February 25 to May 16, 2014. A special session was held on September 9, 2013, to pass disaster aid legislation related to damage caused by storms and flooding in June 2013 and winter storms in April 2013.

== Major events ==
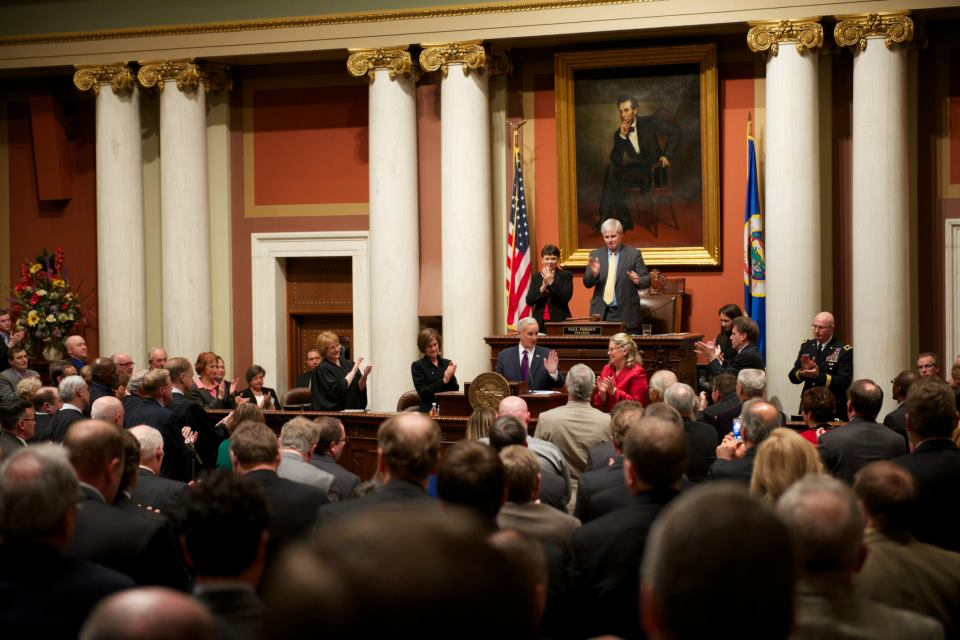
Governor Dayton delivering the 2013 State of the State Address, February 6, 2013.

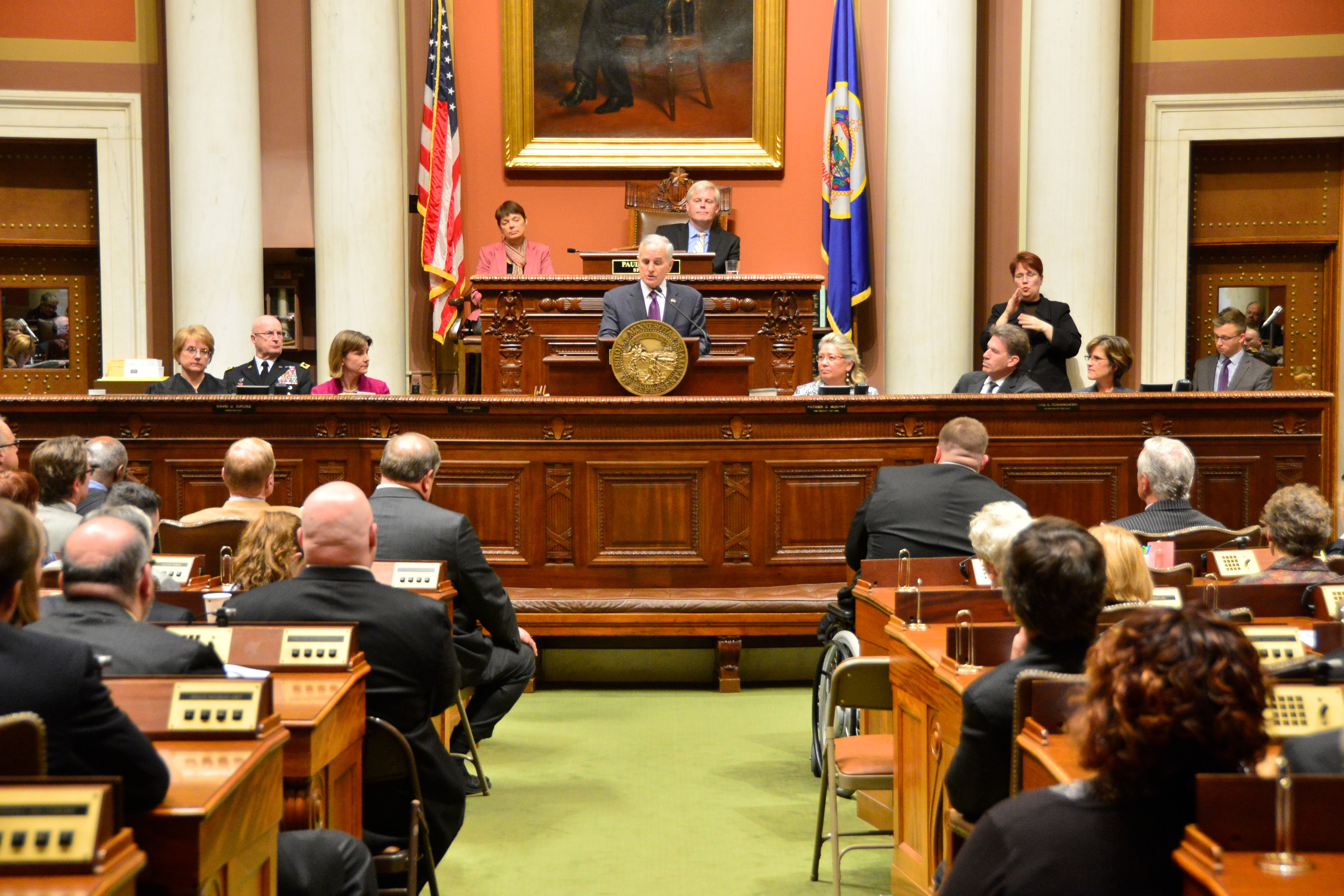
Governor Dayton delivering the 2014 State of the State Address, April 30, 2014.

- February 6, 2013: 2013 State of the State Address
- March 6, 2013: Joint session to elect regents of the University of Minnesota.
- April 30, 2014: 2014 State of the State Address

== Major legislation ==
=== Enacted ===
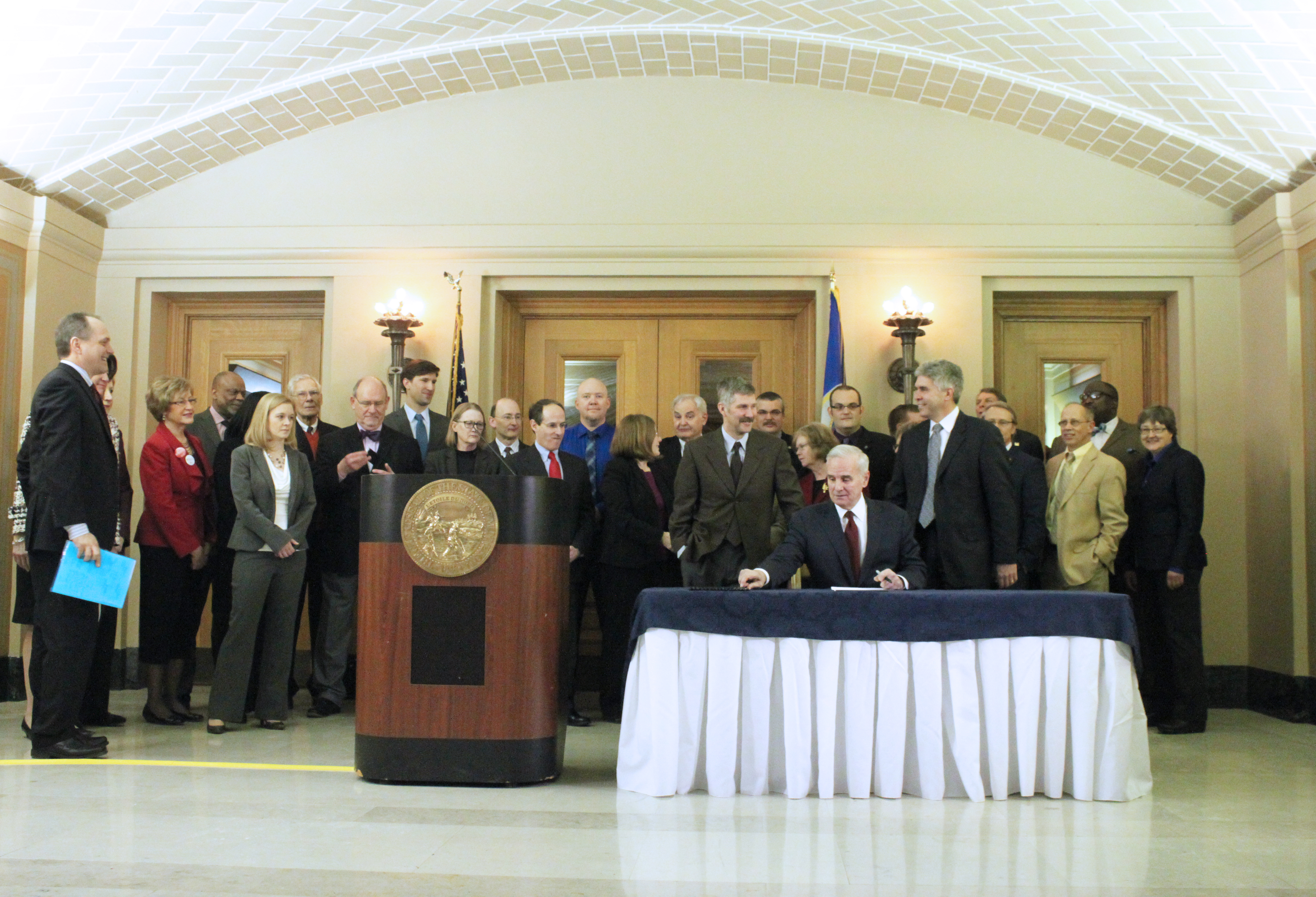
Governor Dayton signing the Minnesota Insurance Marketplace Act into law, March 20, 2013.

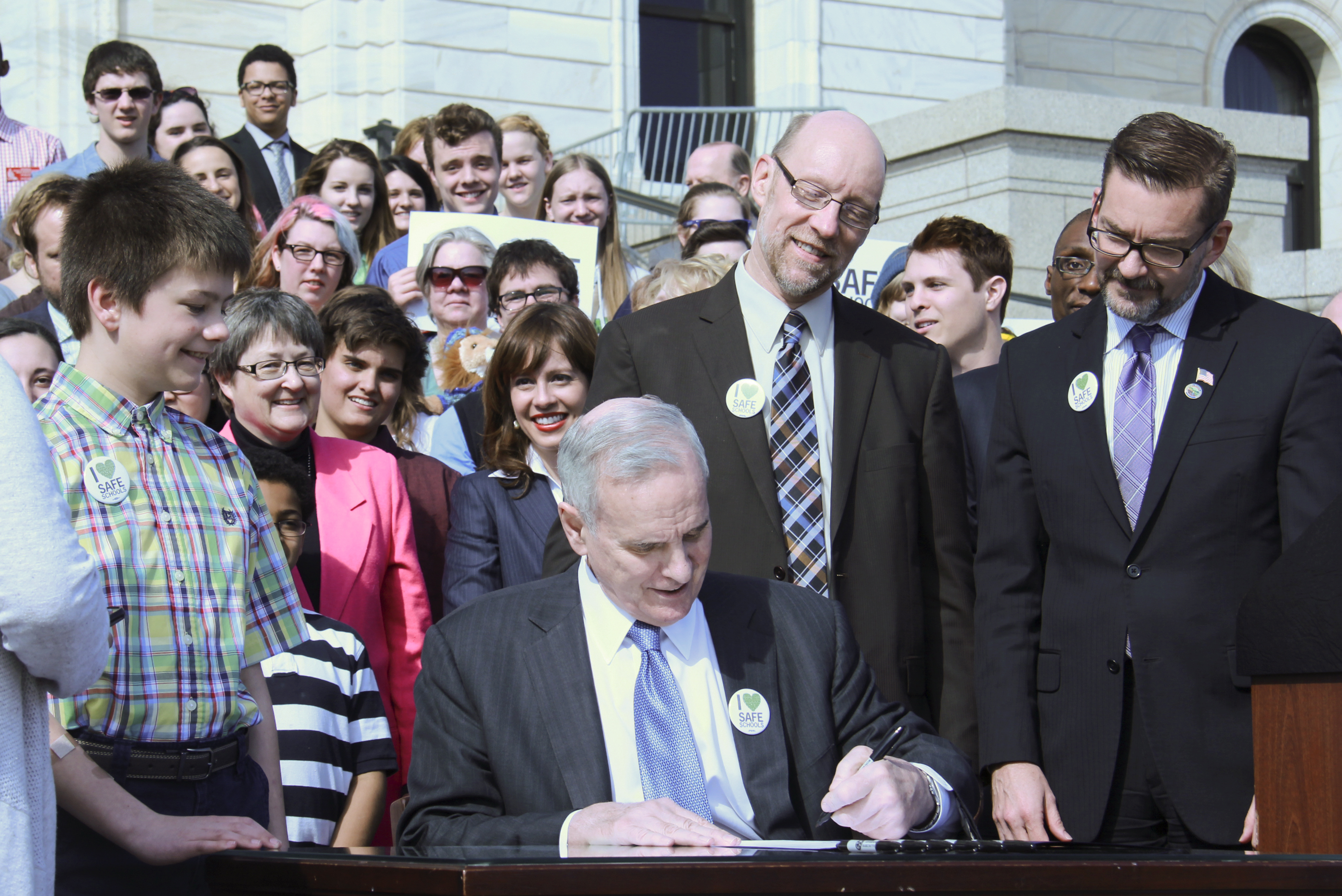
Governor Dayton signing the Safe and Supportive Schools Act into law, April 9, 2014.

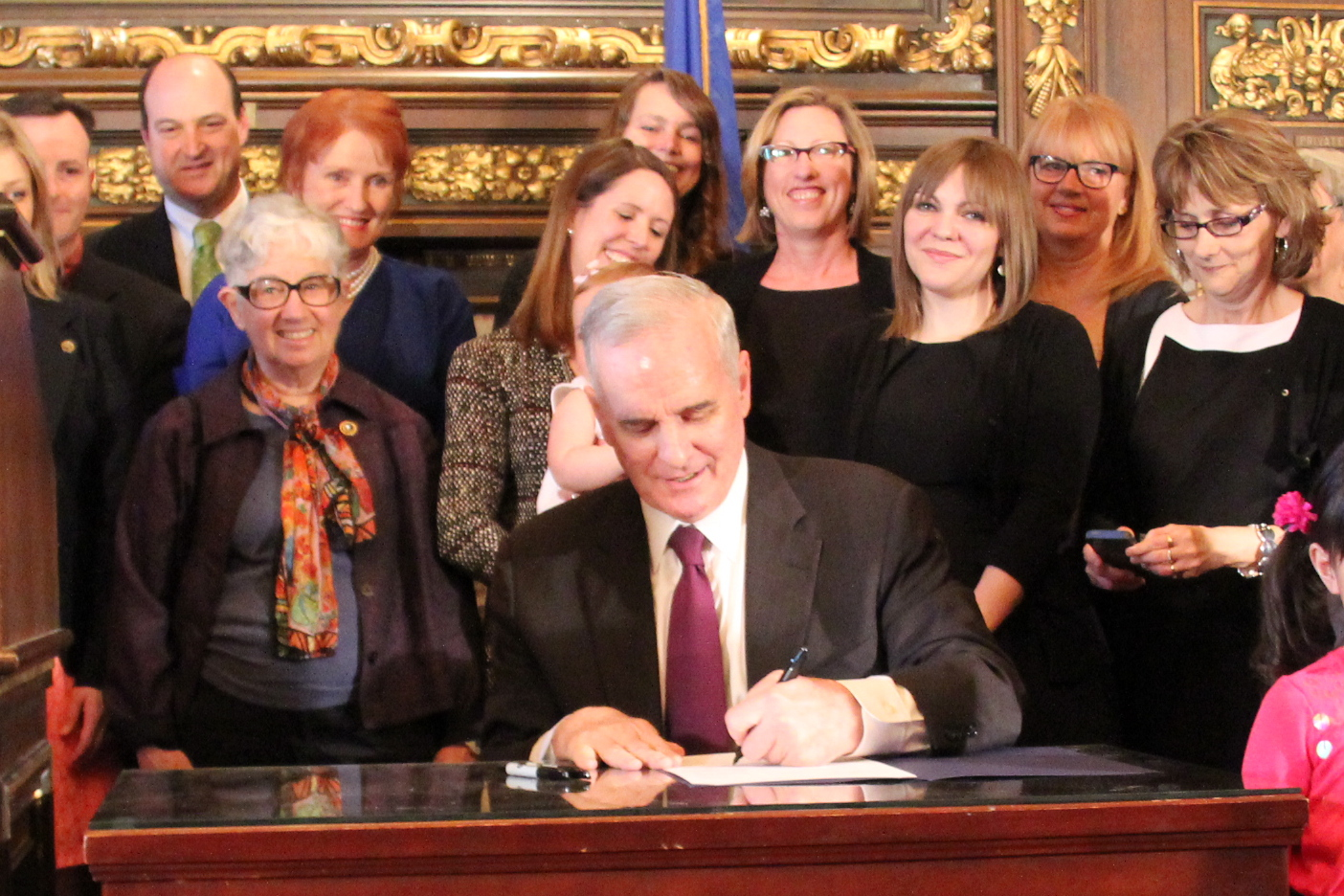
Governor Dayton signing the Women's Economic Security Act into law, May 11, 2014.

- February 19, 2013: Medical Assistance expansion act (Laws 2013, chapter 1)
- March 20, 2013: Minnesota Insurance Marketplace Act (Laws 2013, chapter 9)
- May 9, 2013: Environment and natural resources trust fund appropriations act (Laws 2013, chapter 52)
- May 14, 2013: Civil marriage act (Laws 2013, chapter 74)
- May 22, 2013: Omnibus education act (Laws 2013, chapter 116)
- May 23, 2013: Omnibus jobs, economic development, and energy act (Laws 2013, chapter 85)
- May 23, 2013: Omnibus public safety act (Laws 2013, chapter 86)
- May 23, 2013: Omnibus health and human services act (Laws 2013, chapter 108)
- May 23, 2013: Omnibus agriculture, environment, and natural resources act (Laws 2013, chapter 114)
- May 23, 2013: Omnibus transportation finance act (Laws 2013, chapter 117)
- May 23, 2013: Omnibus elections act (Laws 2013, chapter 131)
- May 23, 2013: Omnibus legacy act (Laws 2013, chapter 137)
  - Two appropriations line-item vetoed.
- May 23, 2013: Omnibus state government and veterans affairs act (Laws 2013, chapter 142)
- May 23, 2013: Omnibus tax act (Laws 2013, chapter 143)
- May 24, 2013: Affordable Care Act conformity and health plan market rules act (Laws 2013, chapter 84)
- May 24, 2013: Omnibus higher education act (Laws 2013, chapter 99)
  - One appropriation line-item vetoed.
- May 24, 2013: "Homeowners' Bill of Rights" act (Laws 2013, chapter 115)
- May 24, 2013: Proposed constitutional amendment removing lawmakers' power to set their own pay (Laws 2013, chapter 124)
  - Amended by Laws 2014, chapter 282.
  - Subject to voter approval on November 8, 2016.
- May 24, 2013: Omnibus transportation policy act (Laws 2013, chapter 127)
- May 24, 2013: Family Child Care Providers Representation Act (Laws 2013, chapter 128)
- May 24, 2013: Omnibus capital investment (bonding) act (Laws 2013, chapter 136)
- May 24, 2013: Campaign finance and public disclosure act (Laws 2013, chapter 138)
- March 21, 2014: Omnibus tax act (Laws 2014, chapter 150)
- April 9, 2014: Safe and Supportive Schools Act (Laws 2014, chapter 160)
- April 14, 2014: Minimum wage act (Laws 2014, chapter 166)
- May 9, 2014: Environment and natural resources trust fund appropriations act (Laws 2014, chapter 226)
- May 11, 2014: Women's Economic Security Act (Laws 2014, chapter 239)
- May 16, 2014: Outdoor heritage fund appropriations act (Laws 2014, chapter 256)
- May 16, 2014: Omnibus education policy act (Laws 2014, chapter 272)
- May 20, 2014: Omnibus capital investment (bonding) act (Laws 2014, chapter 294)
- May 20, 2014: Omnibus capital investment (general fund appropriations) act (Laws 2014, chapter 295)
- May 20, 2014: Omnibus supplemental tax act (Laws 2014, chapter 308)
- May 20, 2014: Omnibus supplemental appropriations act (Laws 2014, chapter 312)
- May 21, 2014: Omnibus health and human services policy act (Laws 2014, chapter 291)
- May 29, 2014: Medical cannabis act (Laws 2014, chapter 311)

=== Proposed ===
Boldface indicates the bill was passed by its house of origin.

- Civil unions substituted for marriage bill (H.F. No. 1805)
- Civil unions bill (H.F. No. 1687)
- Firearms regulation bill (H.F. No. 237/S.F. No. 458)
- Firearms regulation bill (H.F. No. 1323/H.F. No. 1324/H.F. No. 1325)
- "Homeowners' Bill of Rights" (H.F. No. 83/S.F. No. 70)
- Medical cannabis bill (H.F. No. 1818/**S.F. No. 1641**)
- Minimum wage bill (**H.F. No. 92**/S.F. No. 3)
- National Popular Vote Interstate Compact bill (H.F. No. 799/S.F. No. 585)
- Off-sale intoxicating liquor sales on Sunday bill (H.F. No. 1946/S.F. No. 2030)
- Omnibus capital investment (bonding) bill, 2013 (H.F. No. 270/S.F. No. 1293)

== Political composition ==
Resignations and new members are discussed in the "Changes in membership" section below.

=== Senate ===
Senate composition 39 DFL 28 Republican

	Party (Shading indicates majority caucus)		Total	Vacant
	Democratic–Farmer–Labor	Republican	Total	Vacant
End of the previous legislature	29	37	66	1
Begin	39	28	67	0
Final voting share	58.2%	41.8%		
Beginning of the next legislature	39	28	67	0

=== House of Representatives ===
House composition (from February 19, 2013) 73 DFL 61 Republican

	Party (Shading indicates majority caucus)		Total	Vacant
	Democratic–Farmer–Labor	Republican	Total	Vacant
End of the previous legislature	61	72	133	1
Begin	72	60	132	2
February 19, 2013	73	61	134	0
Final voting share	54.5%	45.5%		
Beginning of the next legislature	62	72	134	0

== Leadership ==
=== Senate ===
- President: Sandy Pappas (DFL)
- President pro tempore: Ann Rest (DFL)

==== Majority (DFL) leadership ====
- Majority Leader: Tom Bakk
- Assistant Majority Leader: Katie Sieben
- Deputy Majority Leader: Jeff Hayden
- Majority Whips:
  - Chris Eaton
  - Lyle Koenen

==== Minority (Republican) leadership ====
- Minority Leader: David Hann
- Assistant Minority Leaders:
  - Michelle Benson (until February 24, 2014)
  - Roger Chamberlain
  - Gary Dahms (from February 24, 2014)
  - Paul Gazelka (from February 24, 2014)
  - Bill Ingebrigtsen
  - Warren Limmer
  - Carla Nelson
  - Dave Thompson (until July 3, 2013)
- Minority Whip: David Osmek (from March 13, 2014)

=== House of Representatives ===
- Speaker: Paul Thissen (DFL)
- Speaker pro tempore: Melissa Hortman (DFL)

==== Majority (DFL) leadership ====
- Majority Leader: Erin Murphy
- Majority Whip: John Persell
- Assistant Majority Leaders:
  - Jason Isaacson
  - Leon Lillie
  - Diane Loeffler
  - Carly Melin
  - Kim Norton
  - John Ward

==== Minority (Republican) leadership ====
- Minority Leader: Kurt Daudt
- Deputy Minority Leader: Jenifer Loon
- Assistant Minority Leaders:
  - Steve Drazkowski
  - Tara Mack
  - Joe Schomacker
  - Peggy Scott
  - Paul Torkelson
  - Kelby Woodard
- Minority Whip: Tim Sanders

== Members ==
=== Senate ===
Senate districts by political party affiliation DFL Republican

District	Name	Party	Residence	First elected
1	LeRoy Stumpf	DFL	Plummer	1982
2	Rod Skoe	DFL	Clearbrook	2002
3	Tom Bakk	DFL	Cook	2002
4	Kent Eken	DFL	Twin Valley	2012
5	Tom Saxhaug	DFL	Grand Rapids	2002
6	David Tomassoni	DFL	Chisholm	2000
7	Roger Reinert	DFL	Duluth	2010
8	Bill Ingebrigtsen	Republican	Alexandria	2006
9	Paul Gazelka	Republican	Nisswa	2010
10	Carrie Ruud	Republican	Breezy Point	2002, 2012†
11	Tony Lourey	DFL	Kerrick	2006
12	Torrey Westrom	Republican	Elbow Lake	2012
13	Michelle Fischbach	Republican	Paynesville	1996*
14	John Pederson	Republican	St. Cloud	2010
15	Dave Brown	Republican	Becker	2010
16	Gary Dahms	Republican	Redwood Falls	2010
17	Lyle Koenen	DFL	Clara City	2012*
18	Scott Newman	Republican	Hutchinson	2010
19	Kathy Sheran	DFL	Mankato	2006
20	Kevin Dahle	DFL	Northfield	2008*, 2012†
21	Matt Schmit	DFL	Red Wing	2012
22	Bill Weber	Republican	Luverne	2012
23	Julie Rosen	Republican	Fairmont	2002
24	Vicki Jensen	DFL	Owatonna	2012
25	Dave Senjem	Republican	Rochester	2002
26	Carla Nelson	Republican	Rochester	2010
27	Dan Sparks	DFL	Austin	2002
28	Jeremy Miller	Republican	Winona	2010
29	Bruce Anderson	Republican	Buffalo	2012
30	Mary Kiffmeyer	Republican	Big Lake	2012
31	Michelle Benson	Republican	Ham Lake	2010
32	Sean Nienow	Republican	Cambridge	2002, 2010†
33	David Osmek	Republican	Mound	2012
34	Warren Limmer	Republican	Maple Grove	1995*
35	Branden Petersen	Republican	Andover	2012
36	John Hoffman	DFL	Champlin	2012
37	Alice Johnson	DFL	Spring Lake Park	2012
38	Roger Chamberlain	Republican	Lino Lakes	2010
39	Karin Housley	Republican	St. Marys Point	2012
40	Chris Eaton	DFL	Brooklyn Center	2011*
41	Barb Goodwin	DFL	Columbia Heights	2010
42	Bev Scalze	DFL	Little Canada	2012
43	Chuck Wiger	DFL	Maplewood	1996
44	Terri Bonoff	DFL	Minnetonka	2005*
45	Ann Rest	DFL	New Hope	2000
46	Ron Latz	DFL	St. Louis Park	2006
47	Julianne Ortman	Republican	Chanhassen	2002
48	David Hann	Republican	Eden Prairie	2002
49	Melisa Franzen	DFL	Edina	2012
50	Melissa Halvorson Wiklund	DFL	Bloomington	2012
51	Jim Carlson	DFL	Eagan	2006, 2012†
52	James Metzen	DFL	South St. Paul	1986
53	Susan Kent	DFL	Woodbury	2012
54	Katie Sieben	DFL	Newport	2006
55	Eric Pratt	Republican	Prior Lake	2012
56	Dan Hall	Republican	Burnsville	2010
57	Greg Clausen	DFL	Apple Valley	2012
58	Dave Thompson	Republican	Lakeville	2010
59	Bobby Joe Champion	DFL	Minneapolis	2012
60	Kari Dziedzic	DFL	Minneapolis	2012*
61	Scott Dibble	DFL	Minneapolis	2002
62	Jeff Hayden	DFL	Minneapolis	2011*
63	Patricia Torres Ray	DFL	Minneapolis	2006
64	Dick Cohen	DFL	Saint Paul	1986
65	Sandy Pappas	DFL	Saint Paul	1990
66	John Marty	DFL	Roseville	1986
67	Foung Hawj	DFL	Saint Paul	2012

*Elected in a special election.
†Elected to non-consecutive terms.

=== House of Representatives ===
House districts by political party affiliation DFL Republican

District	Name	Party	Residence	First elected
1A	Dan Fabian	Republican	Roseau	2010
1B	Deb Kiel	Republican	Crookston	2010
2A	Roger Erickson	DFL	Baudette	2012
2B	Steve Green	Republican	Fosston	2012
3A	David Dill	DFL	Crane Lake	2002
3B	Mary Murphy	DFL	Hermantown	1976
4A	Ben Lien	DFL	Moorhead	2012
4B	Paul Marquart	DFL	Dilworth	2000
5A	John Persell	DFL	Bemidji	2008
5B	Tom Anzelc	DFL	Balsam Township	2006
6A	Carly Melin	DFL	Hibbing	2011*
6B	Jason Metsa	DFL	Virginia	2012
7A	Tom Huntley	DFL	Duluth	1992
7B	Erik Simonson	DFL	Duluth	2012
8A	Bud Nornes	Republican	Fergus Falls	1996
8B	Mary Franson	Republican	Alexandria	2010
9A	Mark Anderson	Republican	Lake Shore	2012
9B	Ron Kresha	Republican	Little Falls	2012
10A	John Ward	DFL	Baxter	2006
10B	Joe Radinovich	DFL	Crosby	2012
11A	Mike Sundin	DFL	Esko	2012
11B	Tim Faust	DFL	Hinckley	2006, 2012†
12A	Jay McNamar	DFL	Elbow Lake	2012
12B	Paul Anderson	Republican	Starbuck	2008
13A	Jeff Howe	Republican	Rockville	2012
13B	Tim O'Driscoll	Republican	Sartell	2010
14A	Tama Theis from February 19, 2013	Republican	St. Cloud	2013*
14B	Zach Dorholt	DFL	St. Cloud	2012
15A	Sondra Erickson	Republican	Princeton	1998*, 2010†
15B	Jim Newberger	Republican	Becker	2012
16A	Chris Swedzinski	Republican	Ghent	2010
16B	Paul Torkelson	Republican	St. James	2008
17A	Andrew Falk	DFL	Murdock	2008
17B	Mary Sawatzky	DFL	Willmar	2012
18A	Dean Urdahl	Republican	Grove City	2002
18B	Glenn Gruenhagen	Republican	Glencoe	2010
19A	Clark Johnson from February 19, 2013	DFL	North Mankato	2013*
19B	Kathy Brynaert	DFL	Mankato	2006
20A	Kelby Woodard	Republican	Belle Plaine	2010
20B	David Bly	DFL	Northfield	2006, 2012†
21A	Tim Kelly	Republican	Red Wing	2008
21B	Steve Drazkowski	Republican	Mazeppa	2007*
22A	Joe Schomacker	Republican	Luverne	2010
22B	Rod Hamilton	Republican	Mountain Lake	2004
23A	Bob Gunther	Republican	Fairmont	1995*
23B	Tony Cornish	Republican	Vernon Center	2002
24A	John Petersburg	Republican	Waseca	2012
24B	Patti Fritz	DFL	Faribault	2004
25A	Duane Quam	Republican	Byron	2010
25B	Kim Norton	DFL	Rochester	2006
26A	Tina Liebling	DFL	Rochester	2004
26B	Mike Benson	Republican	Rochester	2010
27A	Shannon Savick	DFL	Wells	2012
27B	Jeanne Poppe	DFL	Austin	2004
28A	Gene Pelowski	DFL	Winona	1986
28B	Greg Davids	Republican	Preston	1991*, 2008†
29A	Joe McDonald	Republican	Delano	2010
29B	Marion O'Neill	Republican	Buffalo	2012
30A	Nick Zerwas	Republican	Elk River	2012
30B	David FitzSimmons	Republican	Albertville	2012
31A	Kurt Daudt	Republican	Crown	2010
31B	Tom Hackbarth	Republican	Cedar	1994, 1998†
32A	Brian Johnson	Republican	Cambridge	2012
32B	Bob Barrett	Republican	Lindstrom	2010
33A	Jerry Hertaus	Republican	Greenfield	2012
33B	Cindy Pugh	Republican	Chanhassen	2012
34A	Joyce Peppin	Republican	Rogers	2004
34B	Kurt Zellers	Republican	Maple Grove	2003*
35A	Jim Abeler	Republican	Anoka	1998
35B	Peggy Scott	Republican	Andover	2008
36A	Mark Uglem	Republican	Champlin	2012
36B	Melissa Hortman	DFL	Brooklyn Park	2004
37A	Jerry Newton	DFL	Coon Rapids	2008, 2012†
37B	Tim Sanders	Republican	Blaine	2008
38A	Linda Runbeck	Republican	Circle Pines	1989*, 2010†
38B	Matt Dean	Republican	Dellwood	2004
39A	Bob Dettmer	Republican	Forest Lake	2006
39B	Kathy Lohmer	Republican	Stillwater	2010
40A	Mike Nelson	DFL	Brooklyn Park	2002
40B	Debra Hilstrom	DFL	Brooklyn Center	2000
41A	Connie Bernardy	DFL	Fridley	2000, 2012†
41B	Carolyn Laine	DFL	Columbia Heights	2006
42A	Barb Yarusso	DFL	Shoreview	2012
42B	Jason Isaacson	DFL	Shoreview	2012
43A	Peter Fischer	DFL	Maplewood	2012
43B	Leon Lillie	DFL	North St. Paul	2004
44A	Sarah Anderson	Republican	Plymouth	2006
44B	John Benson	DFL	Minnetonka	2006
45A	Lyndon Carlson	DFL	Crystal	1972
45B	Mike Freiberg	DFL	Golden Valley	2012
46A	Ryan Winkler	DFL	Golden Valley	2006
46B	Steve Simon	DFL	St. Louis Park	2004
47A	Ernie Leidiger	Republican	Mayer	2010
47B	Joe Hoppe	Republican	Chaska	2002
48A	Yvonne Selcer	DFL	Minnetonka	2012
48B	Jenifer Loon	Republican	Eden Prairie	2008
49A	Ron Erhardt	DFL	Edina	1990, 2012†
49B	Paul Rosenthal	DFL	Edina	2008, 2012†
50A	Linda Slocum	DFL	Richfield	2006
50B	Ann Lenczewski	DFL	Bloomington	1998
51A	Sandra Masin	DFL	Eagan	2006, 2012†
51B	Laurie Halverson	DFL	Eagan	2012
52A	Rick Hansen	DFL	South St. Paul	2004
52B	Joe Atkins	DFL	Inver Grove Heights	2002
53A	JoAnn Ward	DFL	Woodbury	2012
53B	Andrea Kieffer	Republican	Woodbury	2010
54A	Dan Schoen	DFL	St. Paul Park	2012
54B	Denny McNamara	Republican	Hastings	2002
55A	Mike Beard	Republican	Shakopee	2002
55B	Tony Albright	Republican	Prior Lake	2012
56A	Pam Myhra	Republican	Burnsville	2010
56B	Will Morgan	DFL	Burnsville	2006, 2012†
57A	Tara Mack	Republican	Apple Valley	2008
57B	Anna Wills	Republican	Apple Valley	2012
58A	Mary Liz Holberg	Republican	Lakeville	1998
58B	Pat Garofalo	Republican	Farmington	2004
59A	Joe Mullery	DFL	Minneapolis	1996
59B	Raymond Dehn	DFL	Minneapolis	2012
60A	Diane Loeffler	DFL	Minneapolis	2004
60B	Phyllis Kahn	DFL	Minneapolis	1972
61A	Frank Hornstein	DFL	Minneapolis	2002
61B	Paul Thissen	DFL	Minneapolis	2002
62A	Karen Clark	DFL	Minneapolis	1980
62B	Susan Allen	DFL	Minneapolis	2012*
63A	Jim Davnie	DFL	Minneapolis	2000
63B	Jean Wagenius	DFL	Minneapolis	1986
64A	Erin Murphy	DFL	Saint Paul	2006
64B	Michael Paymar	DFL	Saint Paul	1996
65A	Rena Moran	DFL	Saint Paul	2010
65B	Carlos Mariani	DFL	Saint Paul	1990
66A	Alice Hausman	DFL	Saint Paul	1989*
66B	John Lesch	DFL	Saint Paul	2002
67A	Tim Mahoney	DFL	Saint Paul	1998
67B	Sheldon Johnson	DFL	Saint Paul	2000

*Elected in a special election.
†Elected to non-consecutive terms.

== Changes in membership ==
=== House of Representatives ===
District	Vacated by	Reason for change	Successor	Date of successor's formal installation (Note: When seated or oath administered, not necessarily when service began.)
14A	Steve Gottwalt (R)	Resigned January 7, 2013, to become the director of state legislative policy for the Center for Diagnostic Imaging. A special election was held February 12, 2013.	Tama Theis (R)	February 19, 2013
19A	Terry Morrow (DFL)	Resigned January 7, 2013, to become the legislative director for the Uniform Law Commission. A special election was held February 12, 2013.	Clark Johnson (DFL)	February 19, 2013

== Committees ==
=== Senate ===
- Capital Investment (Chair: LeRoy Stumpf, Vice Chair: Bev Scalze, Ranking: Dave Senjem)
- Commerce (Chair: James Metzen, Vice Chair: Vicki Jensen, Ranking: Paul Gazelka)
- Education (Chair: Patricia Torres Ray, Vice Chair: Kevin Dahle, Ranking: Carla Nelson)
- Environment and Energy (Chair: John Marty, Vice Chair: John Hoffman, Ranking: Dave Brown)
  - Fish and Wildlife (Chair: Matt Schmit)
  - Lands (Chair: Foung Hawj)
- Finance (Chair: Dick Cohen, Vice Chair: Bobby Joe Champion, Ranking: Michelle Fischbach)
  - Divisions:
    - E-12 Division (Chair: Chuck Wiger, Vice Chair: Alice Johnson, Ranking: Sean Nienow)
    - Environment, Economic Development and Agriculture Division (Chair: David Tomassoni, Vice Chair: Foung Hawj, Ranking: Bill Ingebrigtsen)
    - Health and Human Services Division (Chair: Tony Lourey, Vice Chair: Melisa Franzen, Ranking: Julie Rosen)
    - Higher Education and Workforce Development Division (Chair: Terri Bonoff, Vice Chair: Greg Clausen, Ranking: Jeremy Miller)
    - Judiciary Division (Chair: Ron Latz, Vice Chair: Barb Goodwin, Ranking: Warren Limmer)
    - State Departments and Veterans Division (Chair: Tom Saxhaug, Vice Chair: Kari Dziedzic, Ranking: Roger Chamberlain)
    - Transportation and Public Safety Division (Chair: Scott Dibble, Vice Chair: Susan Kent, Ranking: John Pederson)
  - Legacy (Chair: Dick Cohen)
- Health, Human Services and Housing (Chair: Kathy Sheran, Vice Chair: Melissa Halvorson Wiklund, Ranking: Michelle Benson)
- Higher Education and Workforce Development (Chair: Terri Bonoff, Vice Chair: Greg Clausen, Ranking: Jeremy Miller)
- Jobs, Agriculture and Rural Development (Chair: Dan Sparks, Vice Chair: Matt Schmit, Ranking: Gary Dahms)
- Judiciary (Chair: Ron Latz, Vice Chair: Barb Goodwin, Ranking: Warren Limmer)
- Rules and Administration (Chair: Tom Bakk, Vice Chair: Katie Sieben, Ranking: David Hann)
  - Committees (Chair: Tom Bakk)
  - Conference Committees (Chair: Tom Bakk)
  - Elections (Chair: Katie Sieben, Vice Chair: Kent Eken, Ranking: Scott Newman)
  - Ethical Conduct (Chair: Sandy Pappas)
  - Litigation Expenses (Chair: Dick Cohen)
  - Permanent and Joint Rules (Chair: Tom Bakk)
  - Personnel and Budget (Chair: Sandy Pappas)
- State and Local Government (Chair: Sandy Pappas, Vice Chair: Chris Eaton, Ranking: Dan Hall)
- Taxes (Chair: Rod Skoe, Vice Chair: Ann Rest, Ranking: Julianne Ortman)
  - Divisions:
    - Tax Reform Division (Chair: Ann Rest, Vice Chair: Lyle Koenen, Ranking: Dave Thompson)
- Transportation and Public Safety (Chair: Scott Dibble, Vice Chair: Susan Kent, Ranking: John Pederson)

=== House of Representatives ===
- Agriculture Policy (Chair: Jeanne Poppe, Vice Chair: Tim Faust, Lead: Rod Hamilton)
- Capital Investment (Chair: Alice Hausman, Vice Chair: John Ward, Lead: Matt Dean)
- Civil Law (Chair: John Lesch, Vice Chair: Susan Allen, Lead: Peggy Scott)
  - Data Practices (Chair: Steve Simon)
- Commerce and Consumer Protection Finance and Policy (Chair: Joe Atkins, Vice Chair: Patti Fritz, Lead: Joe Hoppe)
- Controlled Substances and Synthetic Drugs (Select, established May 28, 2013) (Chair: Erik Simonson)
- Early Childhood and Youth Development Policy (Chair: Joe Mullery, Vice Chair: Carolyn Laine, Lead: Pam Myhra)
- Education Finance (Chair: Paul Marquart, Vice Chair: Linda Slocum, Lead: Kelby Woodard)
- Education Policy (Chair: Carlos Mariani, Vice Chair: Kathy Brynaert, Lead: Sondra Erickson)
- Elections (Chair: Steve Simon, Vice Chair: Laurie Halverson, Lead: Tim Sanders)
- Energy Policy (Chair: Melissa Hortman, Vice Chair: Will Morgan, Lead: Pat Garofalo)
- Environment and Natural Resources Policy (Chair: David Dill, Vice Chair: Peter Fischer, Lead: Tom Hackbarth)
- Environment, Natural Resources and Agriculture Finance (Chair: Jean Wagenius, Vice Chair: Andrew Falk, Lead: Denny McNamara)
- Ethics (Chair: Jim Davnie, Lead: Tim Kelly)
- Government Operations (Chair: Mike Nelson, Vice Chair: Mike Freiberg, Lead: Joyce Peppin)
- Health and Human Services Finance (Chair: Tom Huntley, Vice Chair: Kim Norton, Lead: Jim Abeler)
- Health and Human Services Policy (Chair: Tina Liebling, Vice Chair: Rena Moran, Lead: Tara Mack)
- Higher Education Finance and Policy (Chair: Gene Pelowski, Vice Chair: Zach Dorholt, Lead: Bud Nornes)
- Housing Finance and Policy (Chair: Karen Clark, Vice Chair: David Bly, Lead: Paul Anderson)
- Jobs and Economic Development Finance and Policy (Chair: Tim Mahoney, Vice Chair: John Persell, Lead: Bob Gunther)
- Judiciary Finance and Policy (Chair: Debra Hilstrom, Vice Chair: Carly Melin, Lead: Steve Drazkowski)
- Labor, Workplace and Regulated Industries (Chair: Sheldon Johnson, Vice Chair: Mike Sundin, Lead: Tim O'Driscoll)
- Legacy (Chair: Phyllis Kahn, Vice Chair: Leon Lillie, Lead: Dean Urdahl)
- Living Wage Jobs (Select) (Chair: Ryan Winkler)
- Public Safety Finance and Policy (Chair: Michael Paymar, Vice Chair: Paul Rosenthal, Lead: Tony Cornish)
- Rules and Legislative Administration (Chair: Erin Murphy, Vice Chair: John Benson, Lead: Kurt Daudt)
- State Government Finance and Veterans Affairs (Chair: Mary Murphy, Vice Chair: Jerry Newton, Lead: Bob Dettmer)
- Taxes (Chair: Ann Lenczewski, Vice Chair: Diane Loeffler, Lead: Greg Davids)
  - Divisions:
    - Property and Local Tax Division (Chair: Jim Davnie, Vice Chair: Ben Lien, Lead: Paul Torkelson)
- Transportation Finance (Chair: Frank Hornstein, Vice Chair: Connie Bernardy, Lead: Mike Beard)
- Transportation Policy (Chair: Ron Erhardt, Vice Chair: Sandra Masin, Lead: Linda Runbeck)
- Veterans Housing (Select, established April 19, 2013) (Chair: Jerry Newton)
- Ways and Means (Chair: Lyndon Carlson, Vice Chair: Tom Anzelc, Lead: Mary Liz Holberg)

== Administrative officers ==
=== Senate ===
- Secretary: JoAnne Zoff
- First Assistant Secretary: Colleen Pacheco
- Second Assistant Secretary: Mike Linn
- Third Assistant Secretary: Jessica Tupper
- Engrossing Secretary: Melissa Mapes
- Sergeant at Arms: Sven K. Lindquist
- Assistant Sergeant at Arms: Marilyn Logan Hall
- Chaplain: Rev. Dennis Morreim

=== House of Representatives ===
- Chief Clerk: Albin Mathiowetz
- First Assistant Chief Clerk: Patrick Murphy
- Second Assistant Chief Clerk: Gail Romanowski
- Desk Clerk: Tim Johnson
- Legislative Clerk: David Surdez
- Chief Sergeant at Arms: Travis Reese
- First Assistant Sergeant at Arms: Amanda Rudolph
- Index Clerk: Carl Hamre

== Notes ==
Preceded by Eighty-seventh Minnesota Legislatureπ	Eighty-eighth Minnesota Legislature; 2013—2014	Succeeded by Eighty-ninth Minnesota Legislature
