= 2016 Minnesota elections =

2016 Minnesota general election
- November 8, 2016
- Turnout: 74.72%

A general election was held in the U.S. state of Minnesota on November 8, 2016. All seats in the Minnesota Senate and Minnesota House of Representatives were up for election as well as Minnesota's 10 presidential electors and Minnesota's eight seats in the United States House of Representatives. A primary election was held on August 9, 2016.

Voters also approved a proposed amendment to the Minnesota Constitution.

== Federal elections ==
=== President of the United States ===
Minnesota's 10 electors in the Electoral College were up for election, which was won by the Democratic nominees for president and vice president of the United States, Hillary Clinton and Tim Kaine. The electors voted on December 19, 2016.

=== United States House of Representatives ===
Minnesota's eight seats in the United States House of Representatives were up for election. The DFL held five seats compared to the Republicans' three before the election, which was unchanged by the election. Neither party gained or lost seats.

== State elections ==
=== Minnesota Senate ===
All 67 seats in the Minnesota Senate were up for election. The Republican Party of Minnesota won a majority of 34 seats compared to the Minnesota Democratic–Farmer–Labor Party's (DFL) 33. Before the election, the DFL held a majority of 39 seats compared to the Republicans' 28.

=== Minnesota House of Representatives ===
All 134 seats in the Minnesota House of Representatives were up for election. The Republican Party of Minnesota won a majority of 76 seats compared to the Minnesota Democratic–Farmer–Labor Party's (DFL) 57. Before the election, the Republicans held a majority of 73 seats compared to the DFL's 61.

=== Judiciary ===
Minnesota Supreme Court justice Natalie Hudson won election to a six-year term following her appointment in 2015 by Governor Mark Dayton. Several seats on the Minnesota Court of Appeals and the Minnesota District Courts were also up for election.

=== Ballot questions ===
A proposed amendment to the Minnesota Constitution to establish an independent council to set salaries for members of the Minnesota Legislature was approved by voters.

Choice	Votes	%
Yes	2,265,835	76.33
No	536,272	18.07
Blank votes	166,174	5.60
Total	2,968,281	100.00
Eligible voters/turnout	3,972,330	74.72
Source: Minnesota Secretary of State

Amendment results by county Yes: 80–90%; 70–80%
