= Bob Vogel (politician) =

American politician

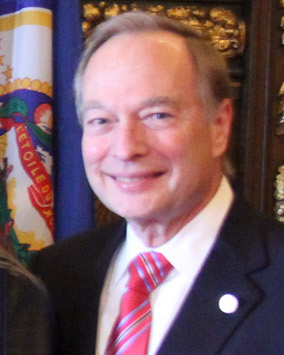

Member of the Minnesota House of Representatives from the 20A district
- In office January 6, 2015 – January 6, 2021
- Preceded by: Kelby Woodard
- Succeeded by: Brian Pfarr

Personal details
- Born: March 17, 1951 (age 75)
- Party: Republican
- Spouse: Laura
- Children: 2
- Education: University of St. Thomas (BA)

Bob Vogel (born March 17, 1951) is an American politician served as a member of the Minnesota House of Representatives for the 20A district from 2015 to 2021.

== Education ==
Vogel earned a Bachelor of Arts degree from University of St. Thomas.

== Career ==
Vogel served as a member of the Scott County Board of Commissioner from 2002 to 2008, including two years as its chair. He was first elected to the Minnesota House of Representatives in 2014.

== Personal life ==
Vogel is married to his wife, Laura. They have two children and reside in Elko New Market, Minnesota.
