= Kelly Fenton =

American politician (born 1966)

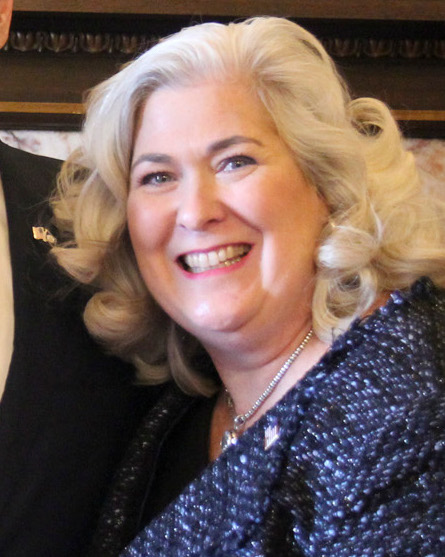

Member of the Minnesota House of Representatives from the 53B district
- In office January 6, 2015 – January 7, 2019
- Preceded by: Andrea Kieffer
- Succeeded by: Steve Sandell

Personal details
- Born: February 23, 1966 (age 60) Texas
- Party: Republican Party of Minnesota
- Spouse: Greg
- Children: 3
- Education: Marquette University (B.A.); University of Houston (M.Ed.)

Kelly Fenton (born February 23, 1966) is an American politician and former member of the Minnesota House of Representatives. A member of the Republican Party of Minnesota, she represented District 53B in the eastern Twin Cities metropolitan area.

== Early life ==
Fenton attended Marquette University, graduating with a bachelor's degree, and later the University of Houston, graduating with a M.Ed.

Fenton was deputy chair of the Republican Party of Minnesota from December 2011 to 2013.

== Minnesota House of Representatives ==
Fenton was first elected to the Minnesota House of Representatives in 2014.

On November 6, 2018, DFL candidate Steve Sandell unseated Fenton in the District 53B election.

== Personal life ==
Fenton is married to her husband, Greg. They have three children and reside in Woodbury, Minnesota.
