= Jon Applebaum =

American politician and attorney

Member of the Minnesota House of Representatives from the 44B district
- In office January 6, 2015 – January 8, 2019
- Preceded by: John Benson
- Succeeded by: Patty Acomb

Personal details
- Born: February 13, 1985 (age 41)
- Party: Minnesota Democratic–Farmer–Labor Party
- Spouse: Kate Fischer
- Children: 2
- Education: Vanderbilt University; University of Minnesota (J.D.)
- Occupation: Finance

Jon Applebaum (born February 13, 1985) is a financial professional and former attorney and American politician, who was a member of the Minnesota House of Representatives. A member of the Minnesota Democratic–Farmer–Labor Party (DFL), he represented District 44B in the western Twin Cities metropolitan area. He was elected Deputy Minority Leader and served in that capacity from 2017-2019.

== Early life ==
Applebaum grew up in Minnetonka, Minnesota and graduated from Hopkins High School. He attended Vanderbilt University, graduating with a bachelor's degree, and later the University of Minnesota, graduating with a J.D.

== Minnesota House of Representatives ==
Applebaum was first elected to the Minnesota House of Representatives in 2014.

== Personal life ==
Applebaum is married to his wife, Kate Fischer. They reside in Minnetonka, Minnesota.
