= Ben Lien =

American politician

Member of the Minnesota House of Representatives from the 4A district
- In office January 2013 – January 2021
- Preceded by: redrawn district
- Succeeded by: Heather Keeler

Personal details
- Party: Minnesota Democratic–Farmer–Labor Party
- Education: Minnesota State University Moorhead (B.A.)
- Occupation: legislator

Ben Lien is a Minnesota politician and member of the Minnesota House of Representatives. A former member of the Minnesota Democratic–Farmer–Labor Party (DFL), he represented District 4A in northwestern Minnesota.

== Early life and education ==
Lien grew up in Moorhead, Minnesota and graduated from Moorhead High School. He attended Minnesota State University Moorhead, graduating with a B.A. in political science.

== Minnesota House of Representatives ==
Lien was first elected to the Minnesota House of Representatives in 2012. He was re-elected in 2014, 2016, and 2018. On January 30, 2020 he announced he would not seek re-election for a fifth term.
