= 1990 Minnesota House of Representatives election =

- November 6, 1990

All 134 seats in the Minnesota House of Representatives 68 seats needed for a majority
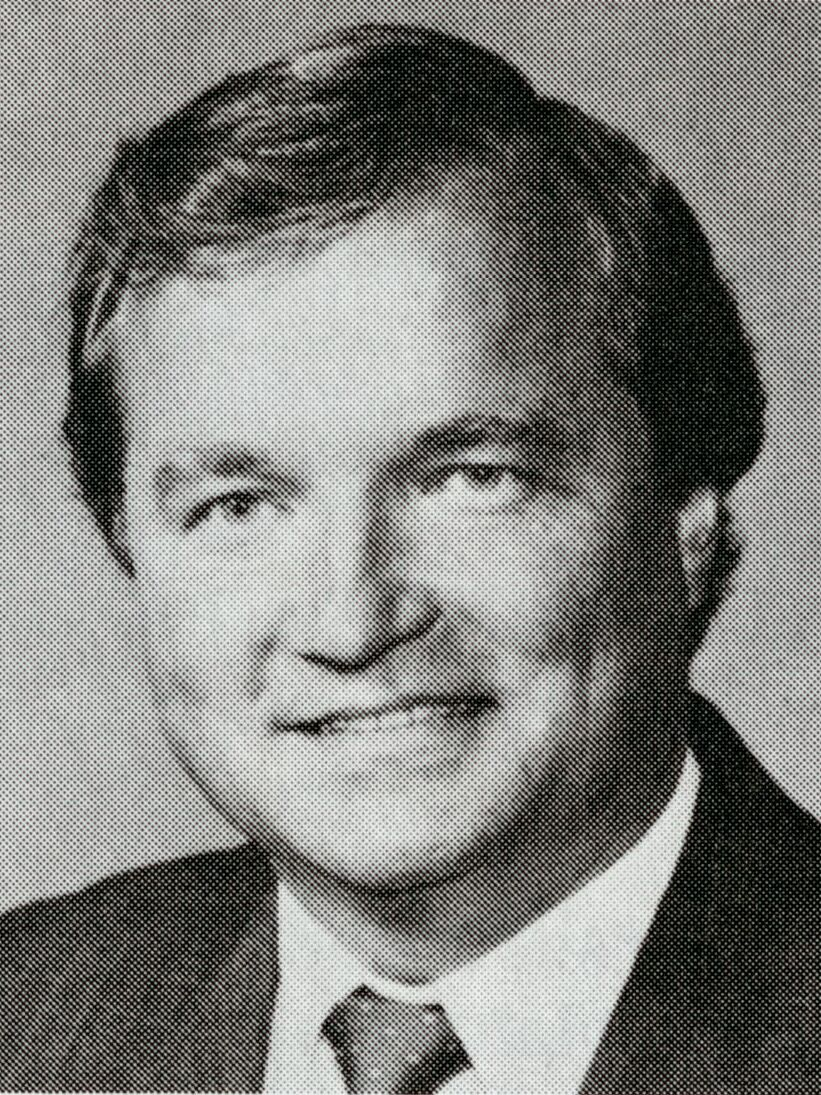
	Majority party	Minority party
Leader	Bob Vanasek	Bill Schreiber
Party	Democratic (DFL)	Ind.-Republican
Leader since	June 2, 1987	November 8, 1986
Leader's seat	25A–New Prague	48B–Brooklyn Park
Last election	81 seats	53 seats
Seats before	80	54
Seats won	80	54
Seat change	Steady	Steady
Popular vote	915,161	803,116
Speaker before election
Bob Vanasek
Democratic (DFL)
Elected Speaker
Bob Vanasek
Democratic (DFL)

The 1990 Minnesota House of Representatives election was held in the U.S. state of Minnesota on November 6, 1990, to elect members to the House of Representatives of the 77th Minnesota Legislature. A primary election was held on September 11, 1990.

The Minnesota Democratic–Farmer–Labor Party (DFL) won a majority of seats, remaining the majority party, followed by the Independent-Republicans of Minnesota. The new Legislature convened on January 8, 1991.

== Results ==
Summary of the November 6, 1990 Minnesota House of Representatives election results
Party	Candidates	Votes	Seats		
Party	Candidates	Votes	No.	∆No.	%
Minnesota Democratic–Farmer–Labor Party	125	915,161	80	Steady	59.70
Independent-Republicans of Minnesota	120	803,116	54	Steady	40.30
Grassroots Party of Minnesota	2	1,232	0	Steady	0.00
Independent	4	13,126	0	Steady	0.00
Total			134	±0	100.00
Turnout (out of 3,136,830 eligible voters)	1,843,104	58.76%		▼10.08 pp	
Source: Minnesota Secretary of State, Minnesota Legislative Reference Library

== See also ==
- Minnesota Senate election, 1990
- Minnesota gubernatorial election, 1990
