= 1990 Minnesota Senate election =

Minnesota Senate election, 1990
- November 6, 1990

All 67 seats in the Minnesota Senate 34 seats needed for a majority
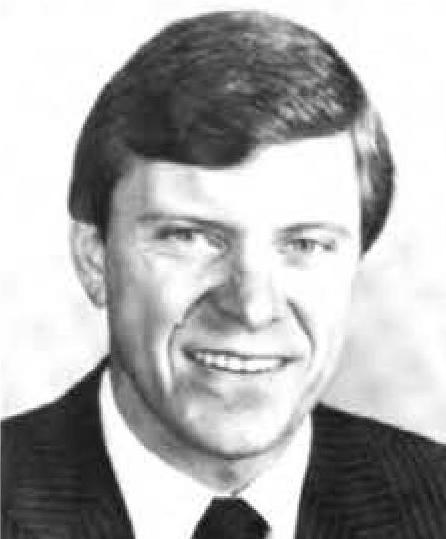

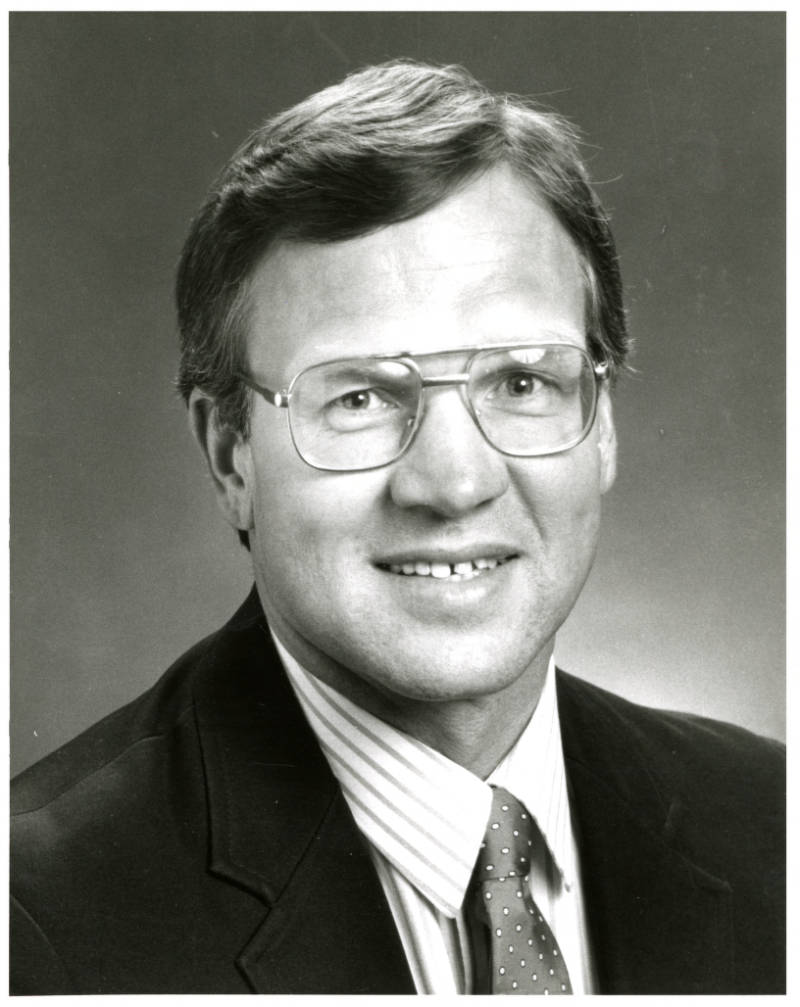
	Majority party	Minority party
Leader	Roger Moe	Duane Benson
Party	Democratic (DFL)	Ind.-Republican
Leader since	1980	January 5, 1987
Leader's seat	2nd–Erskine	32nd–Lanesboro
Last election	47 seats	20 seats
Seats before	44	23
Seats won	46	21
Seat change	▲2	▼2
Popular vote	990,513	775,790
Majority Leader before election
Roger Moe
Democratic (DFL)
Elected Majority Leader
Roger Moe
Democratic (DFL)

The 1990 Minnesota Senate election was held in the U.S. state of Minnesota on November 6, 1990, to elect members to the Senate of the 77th Minnesota Legislature. A primary election was held on September 11, 1990.

The Minnesota Democratic–Farmer–Labor Party (DFL) won a majority of seats, remaining the majority party, followed by the Independent-Republicans of Minnesota. The new Legislature convened on January 8, 1991.

== Results ==
Summary of the November 6, 1990 Minnesota Senate election results
Party	Candidates	Votes	Seats		
Party	Candidates	Votes	No.	∆No.	%
Minnesota Democratic–Farmer–Labor Party	67	990,513	46	▲2	68.66
Independent-Republicans of Minnesota	64	775,790	21	▼2	31.34
Grassroots Party of Minnesota	1	1,797	0	Steady	0.00
Independent	2	5,543	0	Steady	0.00
Total			67	±0	100.00
Turnout (out of 3,136,830 eligible voters)	1,843,104	58.76%		▲10.59 pp	
Source: Minnesota Secretary of State, Minnesota Legislative Reference Library

== See also ==
- Minnesota House of Representatives election, 1990
- Minnesota gubernatorial election, 1990
