= 2000 Minnesota House of Representatives election =

- November 7, 2000

All 134 seats in the Minnesota House of Representatives 68 seats needed for a majority
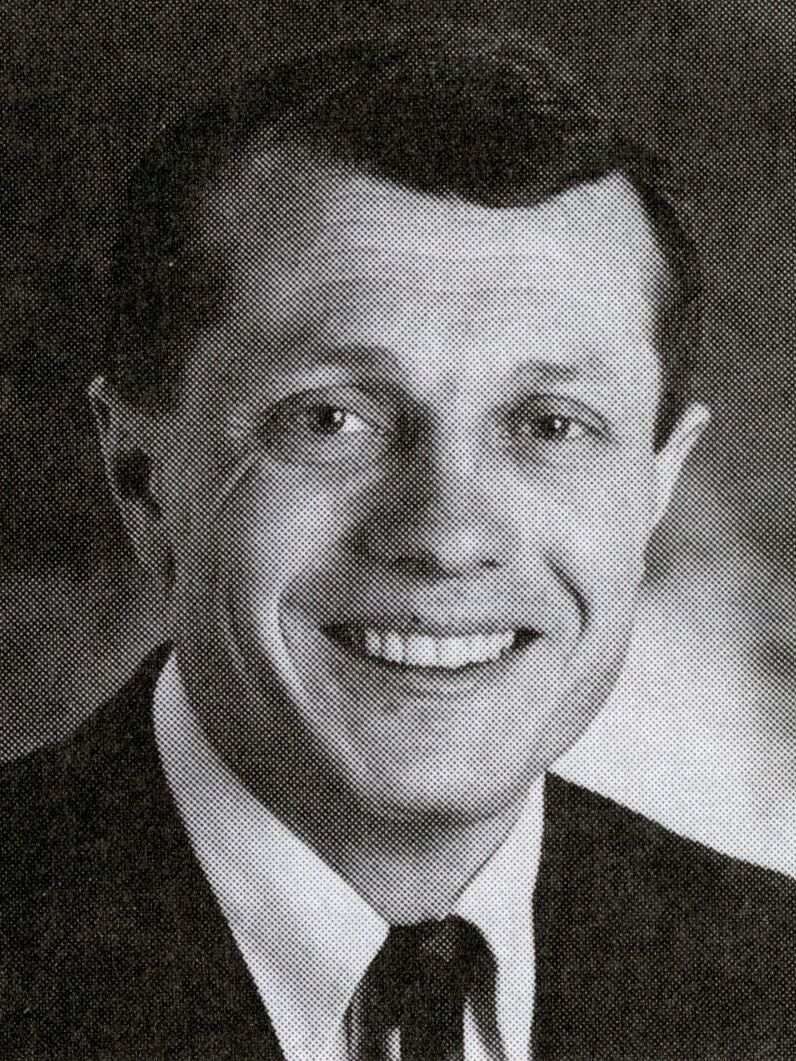
	Majority party	Minority party
		DFL
Leader	Steve Sviggum	Tom Pugh
Party	Republican	Democratic (DFL)
Leader since	April 17, 1992	January 5, 1999
Leader's seat	28B–Kenyon	39A–South St. Paul
Last election	71 seats	63 seats
Seats before	70	63
Seats won	69	65
Seat change	▼1	▲2
Popular vote	1,171,702	1,058,824
Percentage	51.39%	46.44%
Swing	▼0.79pp	▲0.01pp
Speaker before election
Steve Sviggum
Republican
Elected Speaker
Steve Sviggum
Republican

The 2000 Minnesota House of Representatives election was held in the U.S. state of Minnesota on November 7, 2000, to elect members to the House of Representatives of the 82nd Minnesota Legislature. A primary election was held on September 12, 2000.

The Republican Party of Minnesota won a majority of seats, remaining the majority party, followed by the Minnesota Democratic–Farmer–Labor Party (DFL). The new Legislature convened on January 3, 2001.

== Results ==
Summary of the November 7, 2000 Minnesota House of Representatives election results
Party	Candidates	Votes	Seats		
Party	Candidates	Votes	No.	∆No.	%
Republican Party of Minnesota	132	1,171,702	69	▼1	51.49
Minnesota Democratic–Farmer–Labor Party	121	1,058,824	65	▲2	48.51
Independence Party of Minnesota	27	41,051	0	▼1	0.00
Constitution Party of Minnesota	3	4,221	0	Steady	0.00
Green Party of Minnesota	1	2,867	0	Steady	0.00
Libertarian Party of Minnesota	1	646	0	Steady	0.00
Write-in	1	338	0	Steady	0.00
Total			134	±0	100.00
Turnout (out of 3,506,432 eligible voters)	2,458,303	70.11%		▲7.77 pp	
Source: Minnesota Secretary of State, Minnesota Legislative Reference Library

== See also ==
- Minnesota Senate election, 2000
- Minnesota gubernatorial election, 1998
