= 1994 Minnesota House of Representatives election =

- November 8, 1994

All 134 seats in the Minnesota House of Representatives 68 seats needed for a majority
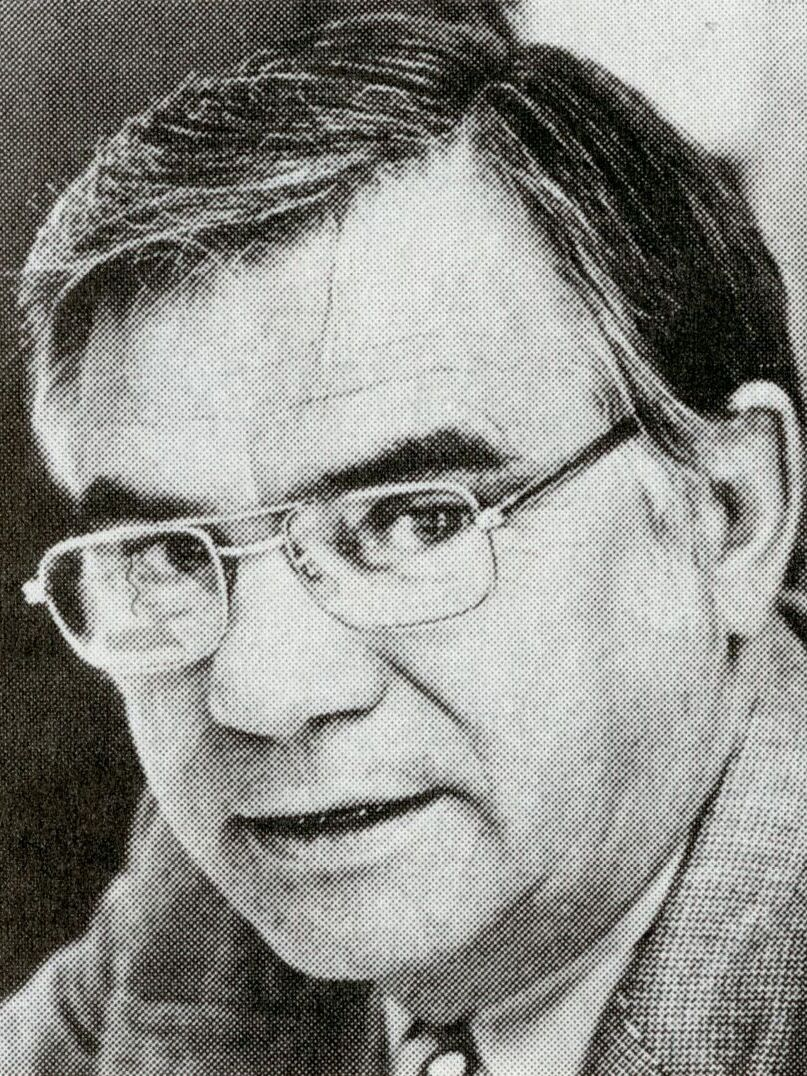

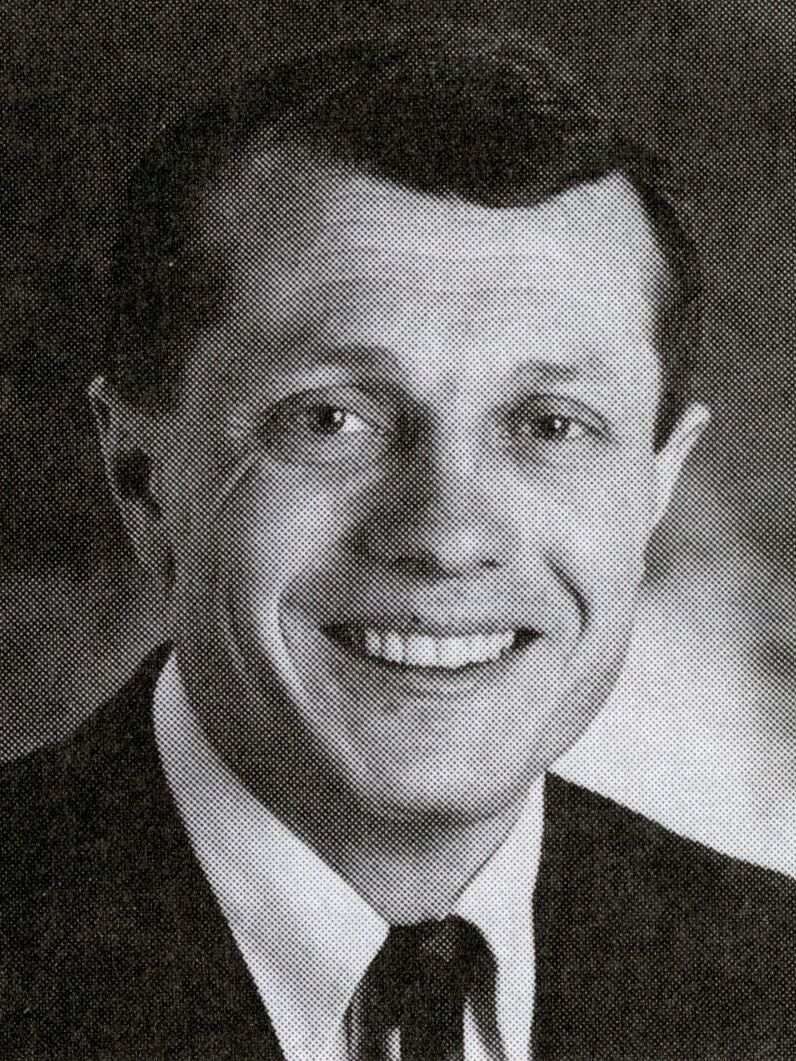
	Majority party	Minority party
Leader	Irv Anderson	Steve Sviggum
Party	Democratic (DFL)	Ind.-Republican
Leader since	September 1, 1993	April 17, 1992
Leader's seat	3A–International Falls	28B–Kenyon
Last election	87 seats	47 seats
Seats before	84	50
Seats won	71	63
Seat change	▼13	▲13
Popular vote	799,973	899,609
Percentage	44.57%	50.13%
Speaker before election
Irv Anderson
Democratic (DFL)
Elected Speaker
Irv Anderson
Democratic (DFL)

The 1994 Minnesota House of Representatives election was held in the U.S. state of Minnesota on November 8, 1994, to elect members to the House of Representatives of the 79th Minnesota Legislature. A primary election was held on September 13, 1994.

The Minnesota Democratic–Farmer–Labor Party (DFL) won a majority of seats, remaining the majority party, followed by the Independent-Republicans of Minnesota. The new Legislature convened on January 3, 1995.

== Results ==
Summary of the November 8, 1994 Minnesota House of Representatives election results
Party	Candidates	Votes	Seats		
Party	Candidates	Votes	No.	∆No.	%
Minnesota Democratic–Farmer–Labor Party	124	799,973	71	▼13	52.99
Independent-Republicans of Minnesota	132	899,609	63	▲13	47.01
Natural Law Party of Minnesota	1	352	0	Steady	0.00
Independent	4	9,672	0	Steady	0.00
Total			134	±0	100.00
Turnout (out of 3,253,779 eligible voters)	1,794,618	55.15%		▼18.76 pp	
Source: Minnesota Secretary of State, Minnesota Legislative Reference Library

== See also ==
- Minnesota Senate election, 1992
- Minnesota gubernatorial election, 1994
