= JoAnn Ward =

American politician (born 1946)

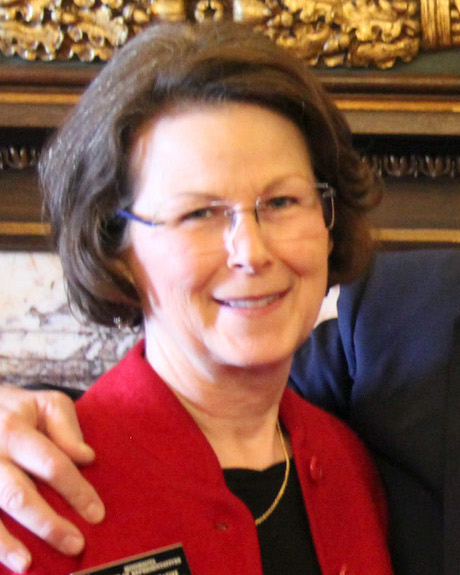

Member of the Minnesota House of Representatives from the 53A district
- In office January 8, 2013 – January 7, 2019
- Preceded by: Nora Slawik (District 55B)
- Succeeded by: Tou Xiong

Personal details
- Born: July 4, 1946 (age 80)
- Party: Minnesota Democratic–Farmer–Labor Party
- Spouse: Joseph
- Children: 3
- Education: Kansas State University (B.S.); University of St. Thomas (M.A.)

JoAnn Ward (born July 4, 1946) is an American politician and former member of the Minnesota House of Representatives. A member of the Minnesota Democratic–Farmer–Labor Party (DFL), she represented District 53A in the east-central Twin Cities metropolitan area.

== Education ==
Ward attended Kansas State University, graduating with a B.S. in education. She later attended the University of St. Thomas, graduating with a M.A. in education.

== Minnesota House of Representatives ==
Ward was first elected to the Minnesota House of Representatives in 2012.

== Personal life ==
Ward is married to her husband, Joseph. They have three children and reside in Woodbury, Minnesota. She is a former high school teacher.
