= 94th Minnesota Legislature =

Legislature of Minnesota, 2025–2027

←	93rd	95th	→
- The Seal of Minnesota

Overview
- Term: January 14, 2025 – TBD

Senate
- Members: 67 senators
- President: Bobby Joe Champion (DFL)

House of Representatives
- Members: 134 representatives
- Speaker: Lisa Demuth (R)

Sessions
- 2025: January 14, 2025 – May 19, 2025
- 2026: February 17, 2026 – May 17, 2026

Special sessions
- 2025: June 9, 2025 – June 10, 2025

The Ninety-fourth Minnesota Legislature is the current meeting of the legislative branch of the state of Minnesota, composed of the Minnesota Senate and the Minnesota House of Representatives. It convened in Saint Paul on January 14, 2025, following the November 2024 elections for the House and a special election for Senate District 45. The Democratic–Farmer–Labor Party (DFL) held a one-seat majority in the Senate and a five-seat majority in the House in the previous legislature. The 2024 elections left the Senate composition unchanged, but it left the House evenly split between the Republicans and the DFL.

Due to a pre-session vacancy, the 94th legislature began with a power struggle between the Republicans and the DFL in the House.

== Background ==
=== House rule changes ===
Under HF 1830, which was passed in the first session of the 93rd Legislature and takes effect on January 13, 2025, the statutory definition of a "legislative day" will only include days "when either house of the legislature gives any bill a third reading, adopts a rule of procedure or organization, elects a university regent, confirms a gubernatorial appointment, or votes to override a gubernatorial veto." This will exclude all committee meetings and votes, as well as first and second reading of any bill in floor session of either house, theoretically allowing for more legislative business to be conducted for more calendar days without violating the constitutional limit of legislative sessions to 120 legislative days every two years. The law also provides for a later start date for the session, moving it from the first to the second Monday in January.

=== Party priorities ===
The Republican House leader Lisa Demuth said to the Sahan Journal in 2025 that her caucus's priorities include opposing any new taxes, eliminating the tax on Social Security, investigating fraud (like the Feeding Our Future scandal) by establishing a new oversight committee, and assessing the necessity of DEI positions within some state agencies.

House DFL priorities, announced during the boycott from a location outside the Capitol, include codified reproductive rights, new environmental protections, and expanded access to child care, education, affordable housing, and health care.

A bipartisan coalition of legislators put forward a bill to legalize sports betting in the 2025 session. Another bipartisan bill sought to ban cell phones in schools. Neither received a floor vote.

The DFL's priorities for the 2026 session include addressing fallout from Operation Metro Surge. Demuth said Republicans will prioritize issuing a bond to pay for state infrastructure projects and create a new state fraud "watchdog" office.

== Session ==
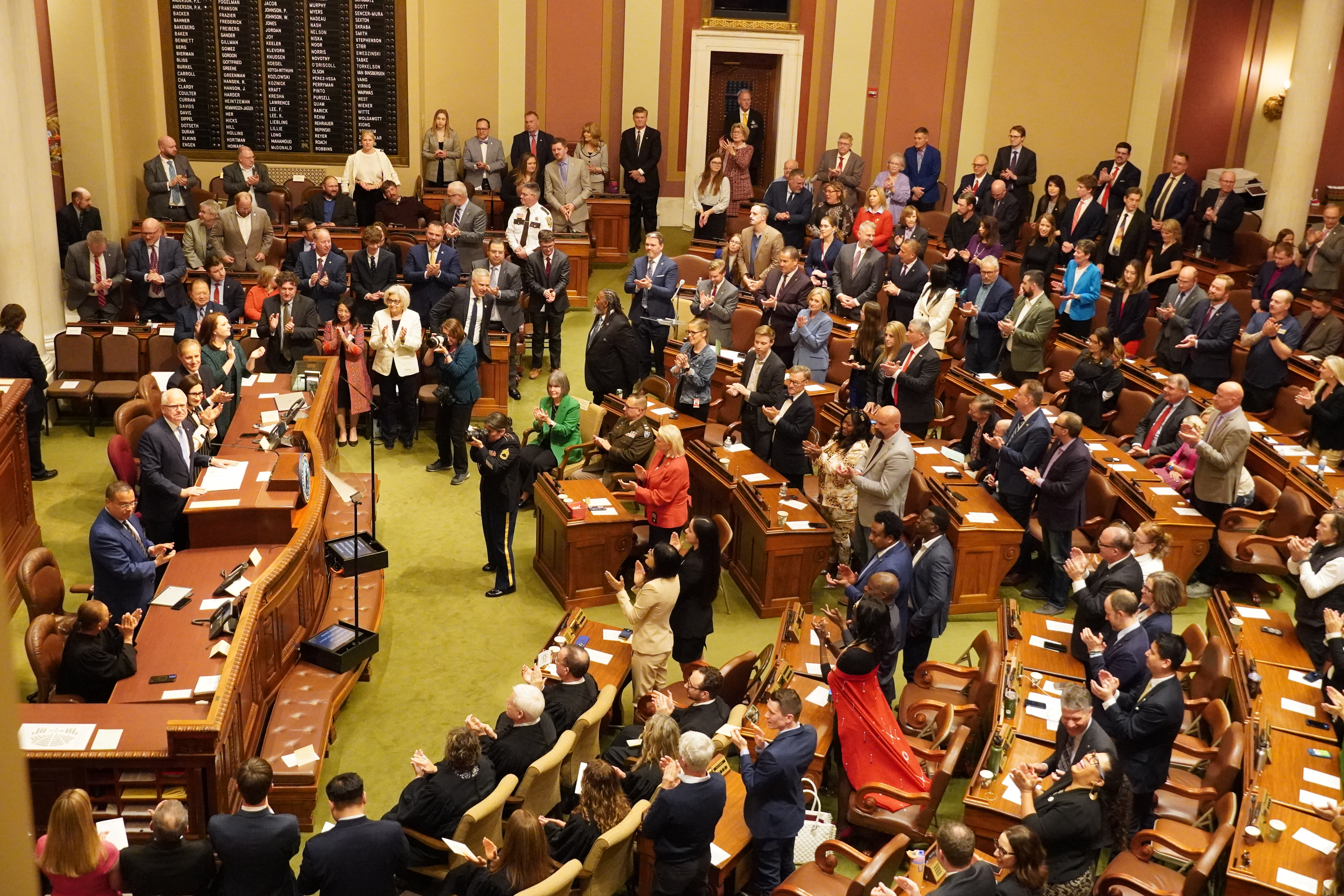
The combined legislative houses at the State of the State Address by Tim Walz on April 23, 2025

While the DFL retained control of the Senate, which was not up for election in 2024, they lost 3 seats in the House to the Republicans, initially leaving the chamber deadlocked at 67–67. This is only the second time in state history that the House was tied after a general election. Negotiations for a power-sharing arrangement ensued between Lisa Demuth (Republican) and Melissa Hortman (DFL). During negotiations, Republicans successfully challenged the election of Curtis Johnson for District 40B of the House at the state's supreme court, leaving a vacancy and requiring a special election. The judge ruled that Johnson does not meet residency requirements and is thus ineligible to serve. This left the house in Republican control at 67–66. Hortman proposed that Republicans temporarily exercise majority control for the first three weeks of the session, including chairing all committees, while maintaining a one-vote advantage on each committee. The DFL vowed not to attend the opening session unless Republicans honored the previously negotiated power-sharing agreement.

On December 27, 2024, Governor Tim Walz called for a special election for January 28, 2025 to fill Johnson's seat. Republicans took his call for an election to court, and the Minnesota Supreme Court ruled the writ of election invalid as he had called the election prematurely. On February 5, he called a new election for the seat on March 11. In that special election, David Gottfried (DFL) was elected, restoring the partisan tie. This was the first of a series of special elections in 2025: Minnesota tied its 1994 record with six legislative special elections in one year.

=== House DFL boycott and power-sharing agreement ===
On January 14, 2025, the House commenced its legislative session without the presence of any DFL House members in the chamber. Pre-empting this boycott, DFL members held a swearing-in ceremony with a judge prior to the start of session, a move that Republicans criticized as illegitimate but that DFL members describe as holding precedent. The DFL's absence was a strategic response to Republican efforts to secure control of the speakership and committee chairs.

Secretary of State Steve Simon, determining that the House lacked the necessary quorum of 68 members, adjourned the session. Shortly thereafter, Republican representative Paul Anderson declared that the 67 Republicans constituted a quorum in the 133-member House, thereby challenging Simon's decision. The Republicans then elected Lisa Demuth as Speaker and Harry Niska as majority leader. In the coming days, they further organized the House, held floor sessions and committee meetings, and passed a resolution concerning the vacancy in district 40B.

In response to Republican actions, Hortman stated that the DFL would continue to deny quorum until the special election in District 40B concluded and the new member was sworn in. The DFL petitioned the Minnesota Supreme Court that the election of a speaker and all actions following the secretary of state's adjournment of the session were unlawful due to the lack of a quorum. The Supreme Court ruled in favor of the DFL, ruling that quorum is 68 seats regardless of any vacancies and effectively voiding all actions taken by House Republicans, including all floor votes, the election of a speaker, and the organization of leadership and committees.

For the following days of session, the house met very briefly: each day the secretary of state took the roll, and with only the 67 House Republicans in attendance, Simon adjourned until the following day. Party leaders are in negotiations over a new power-sharing agreement. Hortman claims that Demuth refused to meet in person for negotiations, Demuth sued Simon, claiming that by adjourning session, he is ignoring a constitutional right of present members to compel the absent representatives' attendance. On February 4, the Minnesota Republican Party announced recall petitions of all 66 members of the house DFL caucus due to their failure to appear at session. DFL members continued to collect salaries, draft bills, and meet with constituents during the boycott.

The three-week boycott ended when the leaders of each party struck a deal on February 5, which included a guarantee that Brad Tabke (DFL) would be seated despite previous election contests from Republicans, and which gave Republicans the speakership and leadership of a fraud and oversight committee. On February 6, they met in the chamber with quorum for the first full session, celebrating with cheers and handshakes as Simon announced quorum. In their first official vote, they elected Lisa Demuth as speaker on a 67-65 vote, making her the first female Republican and the first person of color in the role.

=== Budget and special session ===
Legislators were required to pass a two-year budget by July 1, 2025, to avoid a government shutdown. The predicted budget surplus was lower than the previous session and a potential budget deficit was forecasted by 2029. In March, Senate Republicans proposed around $646 million in budget cuts.

The leaders of both houses and Governor Tim Walz reached an agreement setting global budget priorities on May 15, 2025, shortly before the regular session was scheduled to end. This deal included roughly $5 billion in cuts. One such cut, which will remove coverage for all undocumented adults on MinnesotaCare, triggered protests by some DFL lawmakers. Working groups of legislators continued to negotiate details on outstanding budget areas past the end of the regular session, and a special session was required to pass a budget.

The special session convened on June 9, 2025. The health budget narrowly passed, including the provision removing coverage for undocumented Minnesotans. One house Democrat (Hortman, the DFL leader) and four senate Democrats voted in favor of the bill, while Republican legislators supported it unanimously.

=== Shootings ===
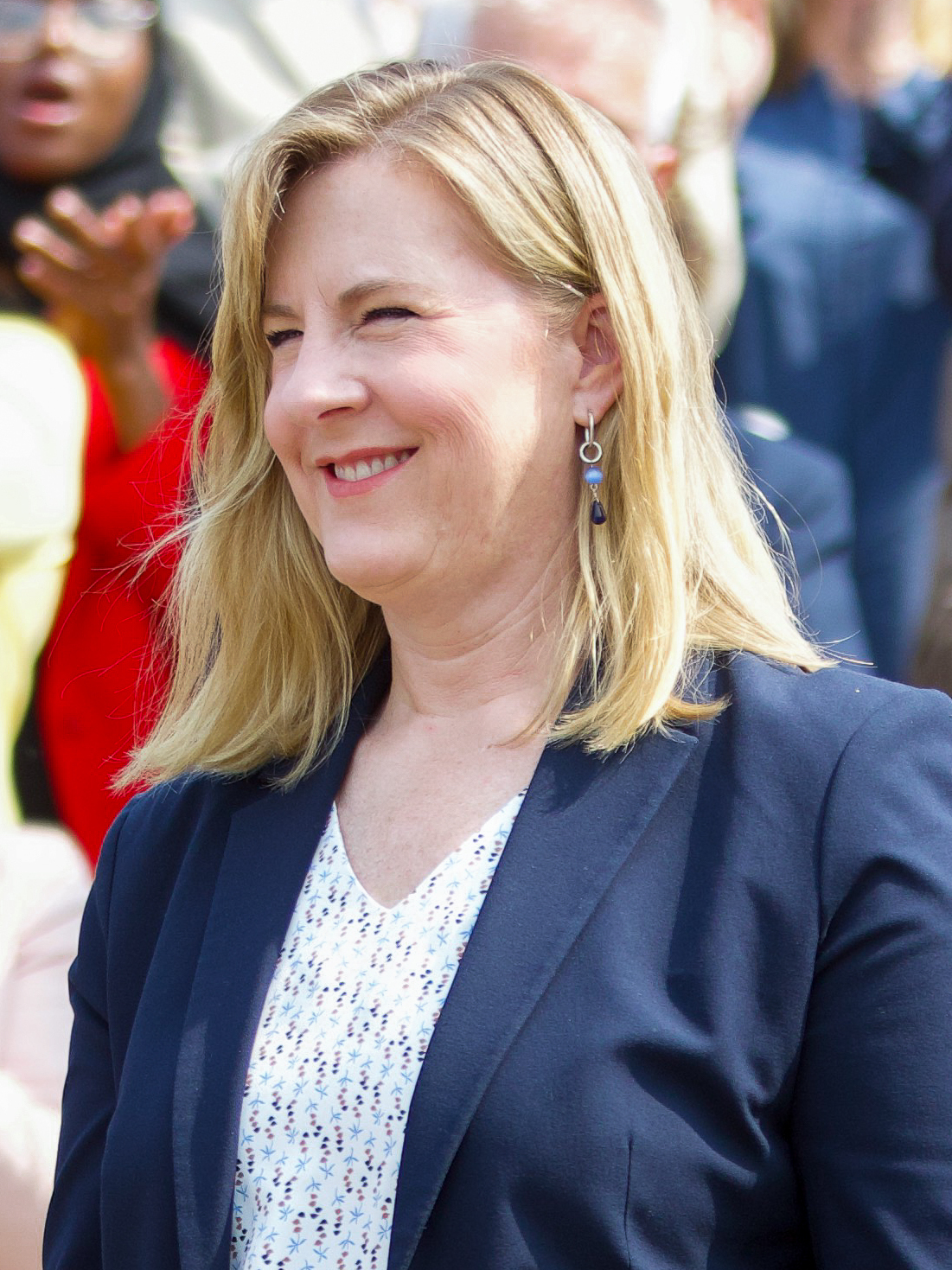
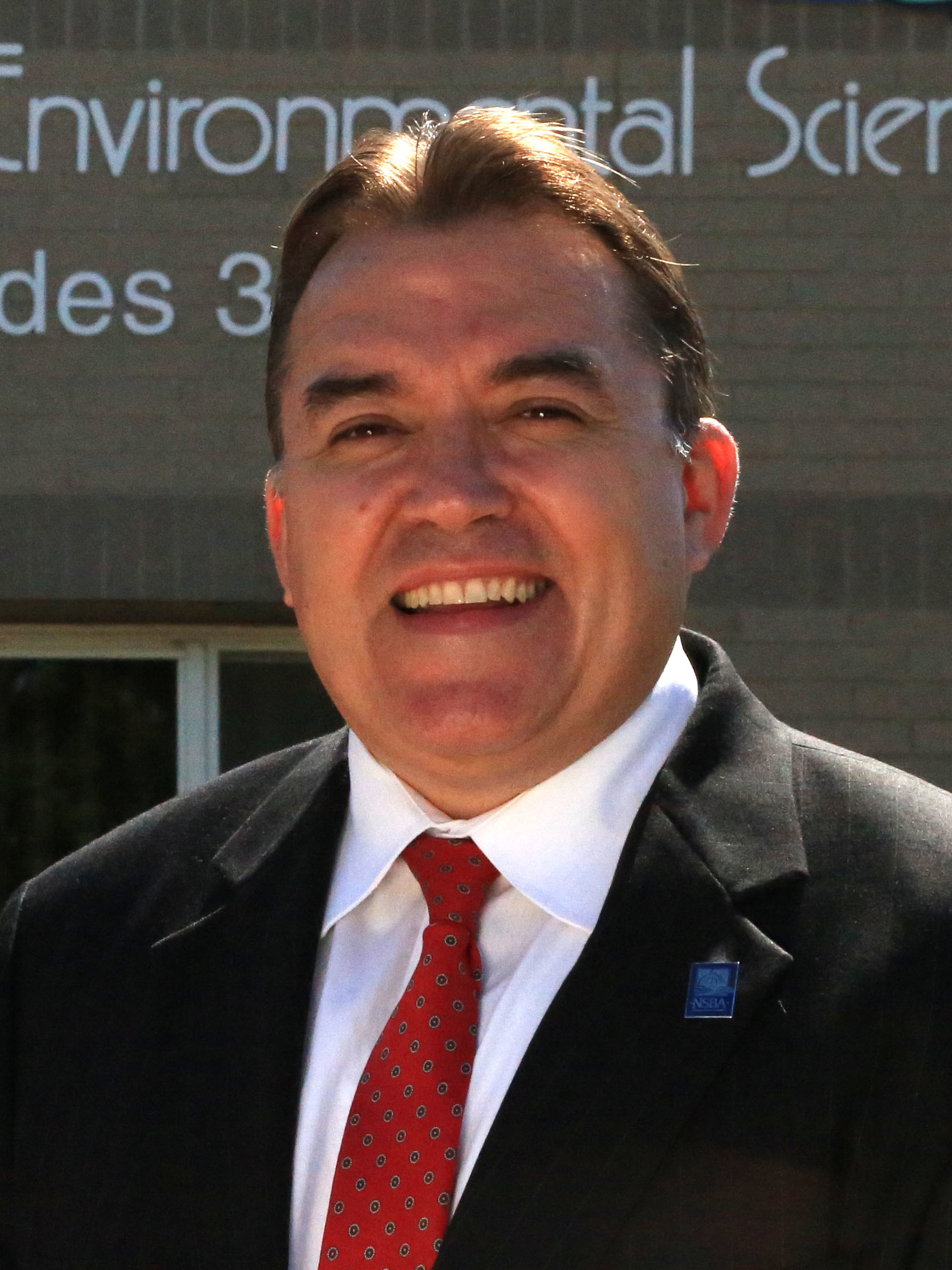
State representative Melissa Hortman (left) and her husband were killed and state senator John Hoffman (right) and his wife were injured

A few days after the conclusion of the special session, a series of targeted shootings took place, affecting DFL state legislators in the cities of Champlin and Brooklyn Park. The suspect, identified as 57-year-old Vance Boelter, allegedly impersonated a police officer during the attacks. The first incident occurred around 2:00 a.m. on June 14 in Champlin, when police received reports of gunfire at the residence of State Senator John Hoffman. Both Hoffman and his wife sustained gunshot injuries but survived the attack. Approximately 90 minutes later, a second shooting was reported in Brooklyn Park at the home of Minnesota House DFL leader Melissa Hortman. Hortman and her husband were killed in this incident.

=== 2026 session ===
The 2026 session convened on February 17, 2026. On the first day of session, there was a ceremony honoring the late Melissa Hortman. Key issues for the session include fraud and federal immigration enforcement; disagreements about both have led to tied votes in the House.

== Major legislation ==
=== 2025 session ===
==== Enacted in 2025 ====
- May 22, 2025: Additional funding for school worker unemployment aid; defunding Northern Lights Express (Laws 2025, chapter 33 - H.F. 1143 / S.F. 906)
- May 22, 2025: DWI law reform, extended ignition interlock device requirements (Laws 2025, chapter 29 - H.F. 2130 / S.F. 2068)
- June 14, 2025: Undocumented adult MinnesotaCare coverage repeal bill (Laws 2025, FIrst special session chapter 2 - H.F. 1 / S.F. 8)
- Omnibus appropriations and policy acts
  - May 23, 2025: Omnibus veterans and military affairs act (Laws 2025, chapter 30)
  - May 23, 2025: Omnibus pension act (Laws 2025, chapter 37)
  - June 14, 2025: Omnibus health/children and families appropriations act (Laws 2025, First Special Session, chapter 3 - H.F. 2 / S.F. 6)
  - June 14, 2025: Omnibus commerce finance and policy (Laws 2025, First Special Session, chapter 4 - H.F. 4 / S.F. 4)
  - June 14, 2025: Omnibus higher education finance act (Laws 2025, First Special Session, chapter 5 - S.F. 1 / H.F. 6)

==== Proposed in 2025 ====
- Ban on cell phone use in K-12 schools (H.F. 2516 /S. F. 508)
- Ban transgender inmates from state women’s prison (H.F. 435 / S.F. 1295)
- Social media sales and use tax (S.F. 3197 / H.F. 3117)
- Sports betting legalization and taxation (S.F. 757 / H.F. 1842)
- Discontinue the Northstar Commuter Rail line (H.F. 269 / S.F. 37)
- Housing permit reform (S.F. 1370 / H.F. 1667)
- Establish a temporary moratorium on certain light rail transit expenditures (H.F. 14 / S.F. 39)
- Require transparency around fees and increase regulations on the power of HOAs (H.F. 1268 / S.F. 1750)
- Authorize electronic drivers' licenses (H.F. 1335 / S.F. 2332)

=== 2025 special session ===
==== Enacted in 2025 (special) ====
- Omnibus appropriations acts
  - Workforce and labor
  - Data center regulatory
  - Transportation finance and policy
  - Tax finance and policy
  - K12 education finance and policy
  - Human services finance
  - Environment and natural resources finance and policy
  - Energy finance and policy

=== 2026 session ===
==== Enacted in 2026 ====
- Establish a nonpartisan, independent Office of the Inspector General to combat fraud

==== Proposed in 2026 ====
- Acquisition and use of facial recognition technology by government entities prohibited
- Establish a teacher mobility interstate compact
- Plastic bottle excise tax
- Establish an office of gun violence prevention
- Limit local governments from mandating HOAs
- Make grooming a felony
- Make Police impersonation a felony
- Ban assault-style weapons, increase school security, and expand mental healthcare

== Political composition ==
=== Senate ===
	Party (Shading indicates majority caucus)		Total	Vacant
	Democratic– Farmer–Labor	Republican	Total	Vacant
End of the previous Legislature	34	33	67	0
December 27, 2024 (Note: Vacancy after the death of Kari Dziedzic)	33	33	66	1
Begin 2025	33	33	66	1
February 3, 2025 (Note: Doron Clark seated. Elected in a special election on January 28, 2025.)	34	33	67	0
March 20, 2025 (Note: Justin Eichorn resigned.)	34	32	66	1
May 6, 2025 (Note: Keri Heintzeman (R) sworn in.)	34	33	67	0
July 21, 2025 (Note: Bruce Anderson (R) died.)	34	32	66	1
July 25, 2025 (Note: Nicole Mitchell resigned.)	33	32	65	2
November 18, 2025 (Note: Two newly elected senators sworn in)	34	33	67	0
Latest voting share	51%	49%		

=== House of Representatives ===
	Party (Shading indicates majority caucus)		Total	Vacant
	Democratic– Farmer–Labor	Republican	Total	Vacant
End of the previous Legislature	69	64	133	1
After the 2024 election	67	67	134	—N/a
Begin 2025 (Note: After the election of Curtis Johnson was successfully challenged in court due to residency requirements, there was a vacancy in district 40B. On March 11, 2025, David Gottfried (DFL) was elected to fill the seat.)	66	67	133	1
March 17, 2025 (Note: David Gottfried (DFL) seated.)	67	67	134	—N/a
June 14, 2025 (Note: Melissa Hortman (DFL) assassinated.)	66	67	133	1
September 26, 2025 (Note: Xp Lee (DFL) seated.)	67	67	134	—N/a
November 17, 2025 (Note: Kaohly Her and Amanda Hemmingsen-Jaeger resigned after their elections to Saint Paul mayor and Senate District 47, respectively)	65	67	132	2
February 4, 2026 (Note: Representatives Meg Luger-Nikolai and Shelley Buck sworn in after winning special elections.)	67	67	134	—N/a
June 21, 2026 (Note: Republican Joe Schomacker (District 21A) resigned in order to pursue business opportunities.)	67	66	133	1
Latest voting share	50.4%	49.6%		

== Leadership ==
=== Senate ===
The Senate began with a power-sharing agreement and two co-presiding officers on January 14, 2025, as there was a vacancy in Senate District 60. After the special election to fill the seat, the Senate reorganized under DFL leadership.

- President: Bobby Joe Champion (DFL)
- President pro tempore: Ann Rest (DFL)

==== DFL leadership ====
- Majority Leader: Erin Murphy
- Assistant Leaders:
  - Liz Boldon
  - Nick Frentz
  - Foung Hawj
  - Grant Hauschild
  - Mary Kunesh
  - Clare Oumou Verbeten
  - Bonnie Westlin

==== Republican leadership ====
- Minority Leader: Mark Johnson (R)
- Assistant Leaders:
  - Julia E. Coleman
  - Karin Housley
  - John Jasinski
  - Gary Dahms
  - Jordan Rasmusson
  - Michael Kreun

=== House of Representatives ===
Leadership of the House of Representatives was first determined on February 6, 2025, following a bipartisan power-sharing agreement. Current leadership is as follows:

- Speaker: Lisa Demuth (R)
- Speakers pro tempore:
  - Bjorn Olson (R)
  - John Huot (DFL) (Note: 2026 session only)
- Deputy speakers pro tempore:
  - Isaac Schultz (R)
  - Kaohly Her (DFL) (Note: 2025 only)

==== Republican leadership ====
- Floor Leader: Harry Niska
- Whip: Jim Nash
- Assistant Floor Leaders:
  - Ben Bakeberg
  - Bidal Duran Jr.
  - Walter Hudson
  - Jim Joy
  - Andrew Myers
  - Kristin Robbins
  - Paul Torkelson
  - Natalie Zeleznikar

==== DFL leadership ====
- DFL Leader: Zack Stephenson (Note: Melissa Hortman held this role until her assassination in July 2025.)
- Floor Leader: Jamie Long
- Whip: Athena Hollins
- Assistant Floor Leaders:
  - Nathan Coulter
  - Brion Curran
  - Heather Keeler
  - Larry Kraft
  - Kristi Pursell

== Members ==
Senate districts by party DFL Republican

=== Senate ===
District	Name	Party	Residence	First elected
1	Mark Johnson	Republican	East Grand Forks	2016
2	Steve Green	Republican	Fosston	2022
3	Grant Hauschild	DFL	Hermantown	2022
4	Rob Kupec	DFL	Moorhead	2022
5	Paul Utke	Republican	Park Rapids	2016
6	Justin Eichorn (until Mar. 20, 2025)	Republican	Grand Rapids	2016
6	Vacant (Mar. 20, 2025 - May 6, 2025)	—N/a	—N/a	—N/a
6	Keri Heintzeman since May 6, 2025	Republican	Nisswa	2025 (Note: Elected in a special election.)
7	Robert Farnsworth	Republican	Hibbing	2022
8	Jen McEwen	DFL	Duluth	2020
9	Jordan Rasmusson	Republican	Fergus Falls	2022
10	Nathan Wesenberg	Republican	Little Falls	2022
11	Jason Rarick	Republican	Pine City	2019
12	Torrey Westrom	Republican	Alexandria	2012
13	Jeff Howe	Republican	Rockville	2018
14	Aric Putnam	DFL	St. Cloud	2020
15	Gary Dahms	Republican	Redwood Falls	2010
16	Andrew Lang	Republican	Olivia	2016
17	Glenn Gruenhagen	Republican	Glencoe	2022
18	Nick Frentz	DFL	North Mankato	2016
19	John Jasinski	Republican	Faribault	2016
20	Steve Drazkowski	Republican	Mazeppa	2022
21	Bill Weber	Republican	Luverne	2012
22	Rich Draheim	Republican	Madison Lake	2016
23	Gene Dornink	Republican	Hayfield	2020
24	Carla Nelson	Republican	Rochester	2010
25	Liz Boldon	DFL	Rochester	2022
26	Jeremy Miller	Republican	Winona	2010
27	Andrew Mathews	Republican	Milaca	2016
28	Mark Koran	Republican	North Branch	2016
29	Bruce Anderson (until Jul. 21, 2025)	Republican	Buffalo Township	2012
29	Vacant (Jul. 21-Nov. 18, 2025)	—N/a	—N/a	—N/a
29	Michael Holmstrom Jr. (since Nov. 18, 2025)	Republican	Buffalo	2025
30	Eric Lucero	Republican	Saint Michael	2022
31	Cal Bahr	Republican	East Bethel	2022
32	Michael Kreun	Republican	Blaine	2022
33	Karin Housley	Republican	Stillwater	2012
34	John Hoffman	DFL	Champlin	2012
35	Jim Abeler	Republican	Anoka	2016
36	Heather Gustafson	DFL	Vadnais Heights	2022
37	Warren Limmer	Republican	Maple Grove	1995
38	Susan Pha	DFL	Brooklyn Park	2022
39	Mary Kunesh-Podein	DFL	New Brighton	2020
40	John Marty	DFL	Roseville	1986
41	Judy Seeberger	DFL	Afton	2022
42	Bonnie Westlin	DFL	Plymouth	2022
43	Ann Rest	DFL	New Hope	2000
44	Tou Xiong	DFL	Maplewood	2022
45	Ann Johnson Stewart	DFL	Wayzata	2024
46	Ron Latz	DFL	St. Louis Park	2006
47	Nicole Mitchell (until Jul. 25, 2025)	DFL	Woodbury	2022
47	Vacant (Jul. 25-Nov. 17, 2025)	—N/a	—N/a	—N/a
47	Amanda Hemmingsen-Jaeger (since Nov. 18, 2025)	DFL	Woodbury	2025
48	Julia Coleman	Republican	Chanhassen	2020
49	Steve Cwodzinski	DFL	Eden Prairie	2016
50	Alice Mann	DFL	Edina	2022
51	Melissa Halvorson Wiklund	DFL	Bloomington	2012
52	Jim Carlson	DFL	Eagan	2006 (Note: Lost re-election 2010. Elected again in 2012.)
53	Matt Klein	DFL	Mendota Heights	2016
54	Eric Pratt	Republican	Prior Lake	2012
55	Lindsey Port	DFL	Burnsville	2020
56	Erin Maye Quade	DFL	Apple Valley	2022
57	Zach Duckworth	Republican	Lakeville	2020
58	Bill Lieske	Republican	Lonsdale	2022
59	Bobby Joe Champion	DFL	Minneapolis	2012
60	Vacant (until Feb. 3, 2025)	—N/a	—N/a	—N/a
60	Doron Clark (since Feb. 3, 2025)	DFL	Minneapolis	2025
61	Scott Dibble	DFL	Minneapolis	2002
62	Omar Fateh	DFL	Minneapolis	2020
63	Zaynab Mohamed	DFL	Minneapolis	2022
64	Erin Murphy	DFL	Saint Paul	2020
65	Sandy Pappas	DFL	Saint Paul	1990
66	Clare Oumou Verbeten	DFL	Saint Paul	2022
67	Foung Hawj	DFL	Saint Paul	2012

=== House of Representatives ===
House districts by party DFL Republican

District		Name	Party	Residence	First elected
1	A	John Burkel	Republican	Badger	2020
1	B	Steve Gander	Republican	East Grand Forks	2024
2	A	Bidal Duran Jr.	Republican	Bemidji	2024
2	B	Matt Bliss	Republican	Pennington	2016
3	A	Roger Skraba	Republican	Ely	2022
3	B	Natalie Zeleznikar	Republican	Fredenberg Township	2022
4	A	Heather Keeler	DFL	Moorhead	2020
4	B	Jim Joy	Republican	Hawley	2022
5	A	Krista Knudsen	Republican	Lake Shore	2022
5	B	Mike Wiener	Republican	Long Prairie	2022
6	A	Ben Davis	Republican	Merrifield	2022
6	B	Josh Heintzeman	Republican	Nisswa	2014
7	A	Spencer Igo	Republican	Grand Rapids	2020
7	B	Cal Warwas	Republican	Eveleth	2024
8	A	Peter Johnson	DFL	Duluth	2024
8	B	Liish Kozlowski	DFL	Duluth	2022
9	A	Jeff Backer	Republican	Browns Valley	2014
9	B	Tom Murphy	Republican	Underwood	2022
10	A	Ron Kresha	Republican	Little Falls	2012
10	B	Isaac Schultz	Republican	Elmdale Township	2022
11	A	Jeff Dotseth	Republican	Kettle River	2022
11	B	Nathan Nelson	Republican	Hinckley	2019 (Note: Elected in a special election.)
12	A	Paul Anderson	Republican	Starbuck	2008
12	B	Mary Franson	Republican	Alexandria	2010
13	A	Lisa Demuth	Republican	Cold Spring	2018
13	B	Tim O'Driscoll	Republican	Sartell	2010
14	A	Bernie Perryman	Republican	St. Augusta	2022
14	B	Dan Wolgamott	DFL	St. Cloud	2018
15	A	Chris Swedzinski	Republican	Ghent	2010
15	B	Paul Torkelson	Republican	Hanska	2008
16	A	Scott Van Binsbergen	Republican	Montevideo	2024
16	B	Dave Baker	Republican	Willmar	2014
17	A	Dawn Gillman	Republican	Dassel	2022
17	B	Bobbie Harder	Republican	Henderson	2022
18	A	Erica Schwartz	Republican	Nicollet	2024
18	B	Luke Frederick	DFL	Mankato	2020
19	A	Keith Allen	Republican	Kenyon	2024
19	B	Thomas Sexton	Republican	Waseca	2024
20	A	Pam Altendorf	Republican	Red Wing	2022
20	B	Steven Jacob	Republican	Altura	2022
21	A	Joe Schomacker (until June 21, 2026)	Republican	Luverne	2010
21	A	Vacant (since June 21, 2026)	—N/a	—N/a	—N/a
21	B	Marj Fogelman	Republican	Fulda	2022
22	A	Bjorn Olson	Republican	Elmore	2020
22	B	Terry Stier	Republican	Belle Plaine	2024
23	A	Peggy Bennett	Republican	Albert Lea	2014
23	B	Patricia Mueller	Republican	Austin	2020
24	A	Duane Quam	Republican	Byron	2010
24	B	Tina Liebling	DFL	Rochester	2004
25	A	Kim Hicks	DFL	Rochester	2022
25	B	Andy Smith	DFL	Rochester	2022
26	A	Aaron Repinski	Republican	Winona	2024
26	B	Greg Davids	Republican	Preston	1991 (Note: Elected in a special election. Lost re-election in 2006. Elected again in 2008.)
27	A	Shane Mekeland	Republican	Clear Lake	2018
27	B	Bryan Lawrence	Republican	Princeton	2024
28	A	Jimmy Gordon	Republican	Isanti	2024
28	B	Max Rymer	Republican	North Branch	2024
29	A	Joe McDonald	Republican	Delano	2010
29	B	Marion O'Neill	Republican	Maple Lake	2012
30	A	Walter Hudson	Republican	Albertville	2022
30	B	Paul Novotny	Republican	Elk River	2020
31	A	Harry Niska	Republican	Ramsey	2022
31	B	Peggy Scott	Republican	Andover	2008
32	A	Nolan West	Republican	Blaine	2016
32	B	Matt Norris	DFL	Blaine	2022
33	A	Patti Anderson	Republican	Dellwood	2022
33	B	Josiah Hill	DFL	Stillwater	2022
34	A	Danny Nadeau	Republican	Rogers	2022
34	B	Melissa Hortman (until Jun. 14, 2025)	DFL	Brooklyn Park	2004
34	B	Vacant (Jun. 14, 2025-Sep. 26, 2025)	—N/a	—N/a	—N/a
34	B	Xp Lee (since Sep. 26, 2025)	DFL	Brooklyn Park	2025
35	A	Zack Stephenson	DFL	Coon Rapids	2018
35	B	Kari Rehrauer	DFL	Coon Rapids	2024
36	A	Elliott Engen	Republican	White Bear Township	2022
36	B	Brion Curran	DFL	Vadnais Heights	2022
37	A	Kristin Robbins	Republican	Maple Grove	2018
37	B	Kristin Bahner	DFL	Maple Grove	2018
38	A	Huldah Hiltsley	DFL	Brooklyn Park	2024
38	B	Samantha Vang	DFL	Brooklyn Center	2018
39	A	Erin Koegel	DFL	Spring Lake Park	2016
39	B	Sandra Feist	DFL	New Brighton	2020
40	A	Kelly Moller	DFL	Shoreview	2018
40	B	Vacant (until Mar. 18, 2025)	—N/a	—N/a	—N/a
40	B	David Gottfried (since Mar. 18, 2025)	DFL	Shoreview	2025
41	A	Wayne Johnson	Republican	Cottage Grove	2024
41	B	Tom Dippel	Republican	Cottage Grove	2024
42	A	Ned Carroll	DFL	Plymouth	2022
42	B	Ginny Klevorn	DFL	Plymouth	2018
43	A	Cedrick Frazier	DFL	New Hope	2020
43	B	Mike Freiberg	DFL	Golden Valley	2012
44	A	Peter Fischer	DFL	Maplewood	2012
44	B	Leon Lillie	DFL	North St. Paul	2004
45	A	Andrew Myers	Republican	Minnetonka Beach	2022
45	B	Patty Acomb	DFL	Minnetonka	2018
46	A	Larry Kraft	DFL	St. Louis Park	2022
46	B	Cheryl Youakim	DFL	Hopkins	2014
47	A	Amanda Hemmingsen-Jaeger(until Nov. 17, 2025)	DFL	Woodbury	2022
47	A	Vacant (Nov. 17, 2025-Feb. 4, 2026)	—N/a	—N/a	—N/a
47	A	Shelley Buck (since Feb. 4, 2026)	DFL	Woodbury	2026
47	B	Ethan Cha	DFL	Woodbury	2022
48	A	Jim Nash	Republican	Waconia	2014
48	B	Lucy Rehm	DFL	Chanhassen	2022
49	A	Alex Falconer	DFL	Eden Prairie	2016
49	B	Carlie Kotyza-Witthuhn	DFL	Eden Prairie	2018
50	A	Julie Greene	DFL	Edina	2024
50	B	Steve Elkins	DFL	Bloomington	2018
51	A	Michael Howard	DFL	Richfield	2018
51	B	Nathan Coulter	DFL	Bloomington	2022
52	A	Liz Reyer	DFL	Eagan	2020
52	B	Bianca Virnig	DFL	Egan	2023
53	A	Mary Frances Clardy	DFL	Inver Grove Heights	2022
53	B	Rick Hansen	DFL	South St. Paul	2004
54	A	Brad Tabke	DFL	Shakopee	2018
54	B	Ben Bakeberg	Republican	Jordan	2022
55	A	Jessica Hanson	DFL	Burnsville	2020
55	B	Kaela Berg	DFL	Burnsville	2020
56	A	Robert Bierman	DFL	Apple Valley	2018
56	B	John Huot	DFL	Rosemount	2018
57	A	Jon Koznick	Republican	Lakeville	2014
57	B	Jeff Witte	Republican	Lakeville	2022
58	A	Kristi Pursell	DFL	Northfield	2022
58	B	Drew Roach	Republican	Farmington	2024
59	A	Fue Lee	DFL	Minneapolis	2016
59	B	Esther Agbaje	DFL	Minneapolis	2020
60	A	Sydney Jordan	DFL	Minneapolis	2020
60	B	Mohamud Noor	DFL	Minneapolis	2018
61	A	Katie Jones	DFL	Minneapolis	2024
61	B	Jamie Long	DFL	Minneapolis	2018
62	A	Anquam Mahamoud	DFL	Minneapolis	2024
62	B	Aisha Gomez	DFL	Minneapolis	2018
63	A	Samantha Sencer-Mura	DFL	Minneapolis	2022
63	B	Emma Greenman	DFL	Minneapolis	2020
64	A	Kaohly Her(until Nov. 17, 2025)	DFL	Saint Paul	2018
64	A	Vacant (Nov. 17, 2025-Feb. 4, 2026)	—N/a	—N/a	—N/a
64	A	Meg Luger-Nikolai (since Feb. 4, 2026)	DFL	Saint Paul	2026
64	B	Dave Pinto	DFL	Saint Paul	2014
65	A	Samakab Hussein	DFL	Saint Paul	2022
65	B	María Isa Pérez-Vega	DFL	Saint Paul	2022
66	A	Leigh Finke	DFL	Saint Paul	2022
66	B	Athena Hollins	DFL	Saint Paul	2020
67	A	Liz Lee	DFL	Saint Paul	2022
67	B	Jay Xiong	DFL	Saint Paul	2018

== Changes in membership ==
=== House of Representatives ===
District	Vacated by	Description	Successor	Date seated
40B	Jamie Becker-Finn (DFL)	Becker-Finn did not seek re-election in 2024. Curtis Johnson (DFL) won the election in November 2024, but his election was nullified due to residency requirements. A special election was held on March 11. David Gottfried (DFL) was elected with close to 70% of the vote.	David Gottfried (DFL)	March 18, 2025
34B	Melissa Hortman (DFL)	A gunman impersonating a law enforcement officer killed Hortman and her husband at their home, and wounded Senator Hoffman and his wife, in separate, targeted attacks. In the special election on September 16, 2025, XP Lee (DFL) was elected with 60.9% of the vote.	Xp Lee (DFL)	September 26, 2025
47A	Amanda Hemmingsen-Jaeger (DFL)	Rep. Hemmingsen-Jaeger resigned after her election to district 47 of the Minnesota Senate. In the special election held on January 27, 2026, Shelley Buck was elected after being unopposed in the general election.	Shelley Buck (DFL)	February 4, 2026
64A	Kaohly Her (DFL)	Her resigned after being elected as the mayor of Saint Paul. At the special election held on January 27, 2026, Meg Luger-Nikolai was elected with 95% of the vote.	Meg Luger-Nikolai (DFL)	February 4, 2026
21A	Joe Schomacker	Schomacker resigned on June 21, 2026 in order to pursue business opportunities. As he resigned after the 94th Legislature adjourned, no special election was scheduled.	—N/a	—N/a

=== Senate ===
District	Vacated by	Description	Successor	Date seated
60	Kari Dziedzic (DFL)	Dziedzic died of cancer-related complications on December 27, 2024, prior to the start of session. A special election was held on January 28, 2025. Doron Clark (DFL) was elected with over 90% of the vote.	Doron Clark (DFL)	February 3, 2025
6	Justin Eichorn (R)	Eichorn resigned after being arrested for soliciting a minor for sex. A special election was held on April 29, 2025. Keri Heintzeman (R) won by 21 percentage points.	Keri Heintzeman (R)	May 6, 2025
29	Bruce Anderson (R)	Anderson died on July 21, 2025. A special election was on November 4, 2025. Michael Holmstrom Jr. was elected, receiving 62% of the vote.	Michael Holmstrom Jr.	November 18, 2025
47	Nicole Mitchell (DFL)	Mitchell resigned on July 25, 2025, after being convicted of burglary on multiple charges. In the special election on November 4, 2025, Amanda Hemmingsen-Jaeger, a sitting representative from district 47A, was elected with 62% of the vote.	Amanda Hemmingsen-Jaeger	November 18, 2025

== Committees ==
=== Senate committees ===
The session began with senate committees co-chaired by members of each party, as control was tied until the seat for District 60 was filled. After the seat was filled in early February, membership elected DFL leadership of senate committees

Minnesota Senate committees
Committee	Chair	Vice chair	Ranking Minority Member
Agriculture, Veterans, Broadband and Rural Development	Aric Putnam	Rob Kupec	Torrey Westrom
Agriculture, Veterans, Broadband and Rural Development: Subcommittee on Veterans	Aric Putnam (DFL, co-chair)	Republican co-chair vacant (Note: Bruce Anderson served in this role prior to his death on July 21, 2025)	—N/a
Capital Investment	Sandy Pappas	Susan Pha	Karin Housley
Commerce and Consumer Protection	Matt Klein	Judy Seeberger	Gary Dahms
Education Finance	Mary Kunesh	Heather Gustafson	Jason Rarick
Education Policy	Steve Cwodzinski	Erin Maye Quade	Julia Coleman
Elections	Jim Carlson	Bonnie Westlin	Mark Koran
Energy, Utilities, Environment, and Climate	Nick Frentz	Tou Xiong	Andrew Mathews
Environment, Climate, and Legacy	Foung Hawj	Jen McEwen	Steve Green (Note: Justin Eichorn served in the role prior to his resignation in March 2025)
Finance	John Marty	Nick Frentz	Eric Pratt
Health and Human Services	Melissa Wiklund	Alice Mann	Paul Utke
Higher Education	Omar Fateh	Aric Putnam	Zach Duckworth
Housing and Homelessness Prevention	Lindsey Port	Liz Boldon	Eric Lucero
Human Services	John Hoffman	Omar Fateh	Jordan Rasmusson
Jobs and Economic Development	Bobby Joe Champion	Zaynab Mohamed	Rich Draheim
Judiciary and Public Safety	Ron Latz	Clare Oumou Verbeten	Warren Limmer
Labor	Jen McEwen	Grant Hauschild	Gene Dornink
Rules and Administration	Erin Murphy	Ann Rest	Mark Johnson
Rules and Administration: Subcommittee on the Federal Impact on Minnesotans and Economic Stability	Lindsey Port	Rob Kupec	Carla Nelson
State and Local Government	Tou Xiong	Heather Gustafson Erin Maye Quade	Andrew Lang
Taxes	Ann Rest	Matt Klein	Bill Weber
Transportation	Scott Dibble	Ann Johnson Stewart	John Jasinski
Source: Minnesota State Senate

=== House committees ===
The initial plan was to adopt a bipartisan approach to House committee leadership as well, with standing committees and divisions co-chaired by members from the DFL and Republican parties. Committee memberships will be equally divided between the two parties. Committee and division co-chairs were announced on November 25, 2024.

On February 6, 2025, the house met with quorum for the first time. Committees have been established with equal numbers of DFL and Republican members on each committee. Until David Gottfried was seated in District 40B, one DFL member on each committee was unable to vote, and the Republican co-chair designates acted as chair. Starting March 18, DFL and Republican leaders switch off running committee meetings and setting agendas and all committee members are able to vote.

Minnesota House of Representatives committees
Republican co-chairs acted as chairs until March 18, 2025, while they held a 1-seat majority in the House.
Committee	DFL co-chair	Republican co-chair
Rules and Legislative Administration	Jamie Long	Harry Niska
Ways and Means	Zack Stephenson	Paul Torkelson
Agriculture Finance and Policy	Rick Hansen	Paul Anderson
Capital Investment	Fue Lee	Mary Franson
Children and Families Finance and Policy	Carlie Kotyza-Witthuhn	Nolan West
Commerce Finance and Policy	Erin Koegel (Note: Kaohly Her before her resignation)	Tim O'Driscoll
Education Finance	Cheryl Youakim	Ron Kresha
Education Policy	Sydney Jordan	Peggy Bennett
Energy Finance and Policy	Patty Acomb	Chris Swedzinski
Environment and Natural Resources Finance and Policy	Peter Fischer	Josh Heintzeman
Ethics	Kelly Moller	Greg Davids
Elections Finance and Government Operations	Mike Freiberg	Duane Quam
Fraud Prevention and State Agency Oversight Policy	—N/a	Kristin Robbins
Health Finance and Policy	Robert Bierman	Jeff Backer
Higher Education Finance and Policy	Dan Wolgamott	Marion Rarick
Housing Finance and Policy	Michael Howard	Spencer Igo
Human Services Finance and Policy	Mohamud Noor	Joe Schomacker
Judiciary Finance and Civil Law	Tina Liebling	Peggy Scott
Labor and Workforce Development Finance and Policy	Dave Pinto	Dave Baker
Legacy Finance	Samantha Vang	Joe McDonald
Public Safety Finance and Policy	Kelly Moller	Paul Novotny
State Government Finance and Policy	Ginny Klevorn	Jim Nash
Veterans and Military Affairs Division	Jay Xiong	Matt Bliss
Taxes	Aisha Gomez	Greg Davids
Transportation Finance and Policy	Erin Koegel	Jon Koznick

=== Joint commissions ===
Committee	Chair	Vice chair	Ref.
Legislative Commission on Pensions and Retirement	Sen. Nick Frentz	Rep. Leon Lillie, Sen. Jeff Howe (Executive committee)	
Legislative Coordinating Committee	Rep. Zack Stephenson	Sen. Bobby Joe Champion	
Legislative-Citizen Commission on Minnesota Resources (Note: This commission also has citizen members and leadership appointed by the governor.)	Sen. Foung Hawj, Rep. Sydney Jordan	Sen. Steve Green, Rep. Josh Heintzeman	
