= 2025 Minnesota elections =

Elections in the U.S. state of Minnesota

- November 4, 2025

Elections were held in the U.S. state of Minnesota on November 4, 2025, for various nonpartisan municipal offices. There were also township elections and several legislative special elections for the Minnesota House and Senate.

Elections to Minnesota's various townships were held on March 11, 2025. Primary elections for the fall general election were on August 12, 2025, where necessary.

== Timing ==
According to Minnesota state statute, special elections may only be held on five days in the year. Though exceptions do occur, the standard dates in 2025 are:

- February 11
- April 8
- May 13
- August 12
- November 4

== State legislative special elections ==
Six special elections to the 94th Minnesota Legislature were held in 2025, tying a record set in 1994 for the most special legislative special elections in a year in Minnesota.

=== Senate district 60 special election ===
A special election was held on January 28, 2025 to fill the 60th State Senate district, which had been vacated by the death of DFLer Kari Dziedzic due to cancer. DFL nominee Doron Clark defeated Republican nominee Abigail Wolters.

A primary election was held on January 14, 2025. In the DFL primary, Clark narrowly won the primary over activist Monica Meyer and a field of five other candidates. In the Republican primary, Wolters defeated Republican Christopher Robin Zimmerman by a wide margin.

DFL primary results by precinct: Clark: 35–39%; 40-44%; 45–49%; 50–54%; 60–64%; Meyer: 30–34%; 35–39%; 40–44%; 45–49%; 50–54%; Wagenius: 35–39%; 40–44%; 70–74%

Senate District 60 Special DFL Primary
Party	Candidate	Votes	%
Democratic (DFL)	Doron Clark	2,073	38.13
Democratic (DFL)	Monica Meyer	1,882	34.62
Democratic (DFL)	Peter Wagenius	1,262	23.22
Democratic (DFL)	Amal Karim	93	1.71
Democratic (DFL)	Iris Grace Altamirano	74	1.36
Democratic (DFL)	Joshua Preston	29	0.53
Democratic (DFL)	Emilio César Rodríguez	23	0.42
Total votes		5,436	100

Senate District 60 Special Republican Primary
Party	Candidate	Votes	%
Republican	Abigail Wolters	153	72.17
Republican	Christopher Robin Zimmerman	59	27.83
Total votes		212	100

Clark: 80–84% 85–89% 90–94% 95–100%

Senate District 60 Special Election
Party	Candidate	Votes	%
Democratic (DFL)	Doron Clark	7,783	90.91
Republican	Abigail Wolters	746	8.71
Write-in		32	0.37
Total votes		8,561	100

=== House district 40B special election ===
A special election was held on March 11, 2025, to fill legislative district 40B of the Minnesota House of Representatives, located in Roseville and Shoreview in Ramsey County. The district was vacated after the election of Curtis Johnson (DFL) was nullified in a supreme court case brought by his Republican opponent, Paul Wikstrom, because Johnson did not live within the district. This case and the resulting vacancy shifted control of the Minnesota House from a tie to a Republican majority. DFL candidate David Gottfried, a pro-bono specialist who dropped out of the race before the 2024 primary, defeated Wikstrom in the special election.

Gottfried: 60–70% 70–80%

Originally, Governor Tim Walz set January 28, 2025 as the date for special election to fill this vacancy. The Minnesota Supreme Court ruled that this election was called prematurely. After waiting the requisite three weeks from the start of session, Walz set a new date for March 11.

House District 40B special election (unofficial results)
Party	Candidate	Votes	%	±%
Democratic (DFL)	David Gottfried	9,352	70.15%	+4.96%
Republican	Paul Wikstrom	3,966	29.75%	–4.80%
Write-in		13	0.10%	–0.16%
Total votes		13,331	100.00%	

=== Senate district 6 special election ===
A special election was held on April 29, 2025 to fill the 6th state senate district, which had been vacated after Republican Justin Eichorn was arrested during a sting operation on suspicion of soliciting a minor for sex. Republican businesswoman Keri Heintzeman defeated DFLer Denise Slipy.

A primary election was held on April 15. In the primary election, Heintzeman defeated a wide field of candidates which included former Minnesota Republican Party chair Jennifer Carnahan and Josh Gazelka, the son of former Senate Majority Leader Paul Gazelka.

Senate District 6 Special Republican Primary
Party	Candidate	Votes	%
Republican	Keri Heintzeman	3,404	46.77
Republican	John A. Howe	1,127	15.49
Republican	Jennifer Carnahan	812	11.16
Republican	Josh Gazelka	679	9.33
Republican	Steve Cotariu	458	6.29
Republican	Angel Zierden	407	5.59
Republican	Doug Kern	363	4.99
Republican	Matthew Zinda	28	0.38
Total votes		7,278	100.00

Senate District 6 Special Election
Party	Candidate	Votes	%	±%
Republican	Keri Heintzeman	12,751	60.27	−3.23
Democratic (DFL)	Denise Slipy	8,376	39.59	+3.15
Write-in		30	0.14	+0.08
Total votes		21,157	100	N/A
Republican hold				

=== House district 34B special election ===
A special election was held on September 16, 2025 to fill district 34B, which was vacated due to the assassination of former speaker Melissa Hortman. The Democratic nominee, Xp Lee, defeated Republican Ruth Bittner, who was uncontested in the Republican primary.

A primary election was held on August 12, 2025, to determine the DFL nominee for the district. Former Brooklyn Park city council member Xp Lee defeated current Brooklyn Park city council member Christian Eriksen and Hennepin County prosecutor Erickson Saye for the nomination.

House District 34B Special Democratic-Farmer-Labor primary
Party	Candidate	Votes	%
Democratic (DFL)	Xp Lee	1,186	59.15%
Democratic (DFL)	Christian Eriksen	489	24.39%
Democratic (DFL)	Erickson Saye	330	16.46%
Total votes		2,005	100.00%

Primary results by county
Town	Eriksen		Lee		Saye		Total
Anoka	19	15.20%	88	70.40%	18	14.40%	125
Hennepin	470	25.00%	1,098	58.40%	312	16.60%	1,880

House District 34B special election
Party	Candidate	Votes	%	±%
Democratic (DFL)	Xp Lee	4,331	60.82%	−2.26%
Republican	Ruth Bittner	2,785	39.11%	+2.37%
Write-in		5	0.07%	-0.11%
Total votes		7,121	100%	N/A
Democratic (DFL) hold				

General election results by county
Locality	XP Lee Democratic		Ruth Bittner Republican		Write-in Various		Margin		Total votes cast
Locality	#	%	#	%	#	%	#	%	Total votes cast
Anoka	289	54.43%	242	45.57%	0	0.00%	47	8.86%	531
Hennepin	4,042	61.34%	2,543	38.59%	5	0.08%	1,499	22.75%	6,590
Totals	4,331	60.82%	2,785	39.11%	5	0.07%	1,546	21.71%	7,121

=== Senate district 29 special election ===
A special election was held on November 4, 2025 to fill the 29th Minnesota Senate district, which was vacated upon the death of Republican Bruce Anderson. Republican Michael Holmstrom Jr. defeated DFLer Louis McNutt by a 25 point margin.

A primary election was held on August 26, 2025, to determine the Republican nominee for the district. Holmstrom faced fellow Republicans Rachel Davis and Bradley Kurtz. Holmstrom Jr. won the primary.

Prior to the primary, an endorsement convention was held on August 5 by the Wright County Republican Party, with Holmstrom Jr. receiving the party endorsement. Following the endorsement four Republican candidates withdrew: Wright County Commissioner Tina Diedrick, Delano City Council Member Jason Franzen, Melinda Mihajlov, and Monticello City Council Member Kip Christianson.

Special Republican primary
Party	Candidate	Votes	%
Republican	Michael Holmstrom Jr.	2,090	73.38
Republican	Bradley Kurtz	621	21.80
Republican	Rachel Davis	137	4.81
Total votes		2,848	100.0

Senate district 29 special election
Party	Candidate	Votes	%	±%
Republican	Michael Holmstrom Jr.	12,328	62.23%	−5.81%
Democratic (DFL)	Louis McNutt	7,459	37.65%	+5.76%
Write-in		22	0.11%	+0.06%
Total votes		19,809	100.00%	

General election results by county
Locality	Michael Holmstrom Jr. Republican		Louis McNutt Democratic		Write-in Various		Margin		Total votes cast
Locality	#	%	#	%	#	%	#	%	Total votes cast
Hennepin	43	49.43%	44	50.57%	0	0.00%	1	1.14%	87
Meeker	226	83.09%	46	16.91%	0	0.00%	180	66.18%	272
Wright	12,059	62.00%	7,369	37.89%	22	0.11%	4,690	24.11%	19,450
Totals	12,328	62.23%	7,459	37.65%	22	0.11%	4,869	24.58%	19,809

=== Senate district 47 special election ===
A special election was held on November 4, 2025 to fill the 47th Minnesota Senate district, which was vacated when DFL senator Nicole Mitchell resigned after being convicted of burglary. DFL state representative Amanda Hemmingsen-Jaeger defeated Republican Dwight Dorau, who was uncontested in the Republican primary, by a 23 point margin.

A primary election was held on August 26, 2025, to determine the DFL nominee for the district. In the primary, Hemmingsen-Jaeger defeated fellow representative Ethan Cha.

Special Democratic-Farmer-Labor Primary
Party	Candidate	Votes	%
Democratic (DFL)	Amanda Hemmingsen-Jaeger	1,978	82.28
Democratic (DFL)	Ethan Cha	426	17.72
Total votes		2,404	100.0

Senate district 47 special election
Party	Candidate	Votes	%	±%
Democratic (DFL)	Amanda Hemmingsen-Jaeger	13,527	61.69%	+2.98%
Republican	Dwight Dorau	8,383	38.23%	−3.01%
Write-in		18	0.08%	+0.04%
Total votes		21,928	100.00%	

General election results by county
Locality	Amanda Hemmingsen-Jaeger Democratic		Dwight Dorau Republican		Write-in Various		Margin		Total votes cast
Locality	#	%	#	%	#	%	#	%	Total votes cast
Ramsey	1,465	65.20%	774	34.45%	8	0.36%	691	30.75%	2,247
Washington	12,062	61.29%	7,609	38.66%	10	0.05%	4,453	22.63%	19,681
Totals	13,527	61.69%	8,383	38.23%	18	0.08%	5,144	23.46%	21,928

== Local elections ==
Seventeen municipalities and twenty-one school districts have regularly scheduled elections in 2025. There are also over 70 municipal and school board special elections, including seat vacancies and ballot questions.

=== Hennepin County ===
==== Minneapolis ====
Regularly scheduled elections were held in Minneapolis for mayor, city council, park board, and the board of estimate and taxation concurrent with the fall general election. Minneapolis uses ranked-choice voting and does not hold primary elections.

In the mayoral election, incumbent mayor Jacob Frey was re-elected to a third term. In the city council election, progressives maintained a majority of seats.

==== Bloomington ====
Bloomington held an election for half of their six-member city council, with one at-large seat and the first and second districts. Bloomington uses ranked-choice voting and did not have a primary election. Bloomington also had a school board election, using plurality block voting.

=== Ramsey County ===
==== Saint Paul mayor ====
A regularly scheduled mayoral election was held in Saint Paul, Minnesota, concurrent with the fall general election. Incumbent mayor Melvin Carter III, first elected in 2017, sought a third term. Carter was defeated for re-election by state representative Kaohly Her. This was the last municipal general election to be held in an off-year in Saint Paul.

==== Saint Paul city council special election ====
A special election was held on August 12, 2025, for the 4th ward of the Saint Paul City Council. The seat was vacated upon the resignation of Council president Mitra Jalali. Activist Molly Coleman was elected in the first round of ranked-choice voting with 52% of the vote. The other three candidates were Saint Paul school board member Chauntyll Allen, public health educator Cole Hanson, and consultant Carolyn Will.

2025 Saint Paul City Council Ward 4 special election
Candidate	Votes	%
Molly Coleman	3,359	52.36
Carolyn Will	1,369	21.34
Cole Hanson	1,124	17.52
Chauntyll Allen	552	8.60
Write-in	11	0.17

=== Saint Louis County ===
==== Duluth ====
Regularly scheduled elections were held on November 4 for four seats on the Duluth City Council: two districts at-large and the 2nd and 4th districts. A nonpartisan primary was held on August 13 for the at-large seats and the 2nd district. In addition, Duluth residents approved a "Renter Right to Repair" ballot question that encourages timely repairs to rental homes by landlords.

Elections were also held for the board of Duluth Public Schools, ISD 709. A primary was held on August 13 for the at-large seats.

== See also ==
- List of special elections to the Minnesota Senate
- List of special elections to the Minnesota House of Representatives
- 2025 United States state legislative elections
