= Chris Ford (politician) =

American politician

Member-elect of the Minnesota Senate from the 32nd district
- Assuming office January 12, 2027
- Succeeding: Michael Kreun

Personal details
- Party: Democratic
- Website: www.chrisfordformn.com

Chris Ford is an American politician of the Minnesota Democratic Party who is the representative-elect for the 32nd district in the Minnesota State Senate. He was elected at the 2026 election. He unseated incumbent Republican Michael Kreun. He is a firefighter.
