= Shelley Buck =

American politician

- Pte Wicota (Dakota)
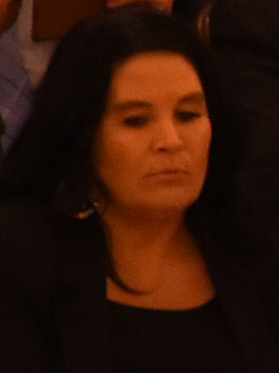
- Buck in 2019

Member of the Minnesota House of Representatives from the 47A district
- Incumbent
- Assumed office February 3, 2026
- Preceded by: Amanda Hemmingsen-Jaeger

Personal details
- Citizenship: Prairie Island Indian Community; United States
- Party: Democratic (DFL)
- Children: 2
- Education: Indiana University Bloomington (BS); Concordia University, St. Paul (MA); University of Tulsa (MJIL)

Shelley Buck (Dakota: Pte Wicota) is an American nonprofit executive and politician who represents District 47A in the Minnesota House of Representatives. Since January 2023, she has served as the president of Owámniyomni Okhódayapi ("Friends of the Falls"), a Dakota-led community organization working on restoring Owámniyomni. Before that, she spent 12 years on the Prairie Island Tribal Council, including six years as its president.

== Education ==
Buck has a Bachelor of Science in accounting from Indiana University Bloomington, a Master of Arts in sports management from Concordia University, St. Paul, and a Master of Jurisprudence in Indian tribal law from the University of Tulsa.

== Career ==
Buck is an enrolled member of the Prairie Island Indian Community. She served on the Prairie Island Tribal Council for 12 years, including stints as the tribe's president.

In 2023, Buck became the president of Owámniyomni Okhódayapi, a nonprofit organization formerly known as Friends of the Falls. The leadership transition occurred when the organization's founders turned control over to Dakota members. Under Buck's leadership, the organization works to restore the area surrounding the Upper Lock at St. Anthony Falls on the Mississippi River. The group advocates for converting the site into a place of education, healing, and cultural connection.

=== Minnesota House of Representatives ===
After Amanda Hemmingsen-Jaeger was elected to the Minnesota Senate in a November 2025 special election, Buck announced her campaign for the Minnesota House of Representatives in District 47A. She named affordability, environmental protection, and gun safety as her top three issues. Buck won a three-way primary for the DFL nomination, defeating advocates David Azcona and Juli Servatius with 87% of the vote, and had no opponent in the general election. On February 3, 2026, she was sworn in alongside Meg Luger-Nikolai, who was also elected in a January special election.

== Personal life ==
Buck lives in the South Maplewood area and has two daughters.

== See also ==
- List of Native American politicians
- Native American women in politics
