= MinnesotaCare =

Public health insurance program in Minnesota, U.S.

MinnesotaCare is a public health insurance program in the U.S. state of Minnesota for low-income individuals and families who lack employee-sponsored health insurance and do not qualify for Medical Assistance (Minnesota's Medicaid program). It is administered by the Minnesota Department of Human Services. Enrollees pay a monthly fee based on income and family size, among other factors. As of 2024, roughly 100,000 Minnesotans are enrolled in MinnesotaCare.

== History ==
MinnesotaCare was established in 1992 by Governor Arne Carlson with bipartisan legislative support. The founding legislation pledged that the state would help pay for medical care for residents up to 200% of the federal poverty level. To finance the program, the state created the Health Care Access Fund, originally funded by a 2% tax on the gross revenues of health care providers (often called the “provider tax”) and a smaller tax on health plan premiums. In 1995, the state obtained a federal Medicaid waiver that allowed some MinnesotaCare enrollees and costs to be partially funded with federal Medicaid dollars. The creation of the Children's Health Insurance Program (CHIP) in 1997 absorbed many lower-income kids and pregnant women, leaving MinnesotaCare mostly for adults.

In 2014, Minnesota received federal approval to operate MinnesotaCare as a Basic Health Program (BHP) under section 1331 of the Affordable Care Act. This meant that the program could be largely funded by federal dollars, and by the late 2010s, federal payments and enrollee premiums were financing about 90% of program costs, with the remainder coming from the state's provider tax fund.

On June 9, 2025, the Minnesota legislature passed a bill repealing undocumented adults' eligibility for MinnesotaCare after Republicans threatened to force a government shutdown otherwise. The vote was largely on party lines, with DFL House caucus leader Melissa Hortman joining all Republicans in the House and DFL Senators Grant Hauschild, Ann Rest, Rob Kupec, and Majority Leader Erin Murphy joining all Republicans in the Senate. On June 14, 2025, Governor Tim Walz signed the bill into law.

== MinnesotaCare coverage, premiums and funding ==
MinnesotaCare coverage includes "doctor visits, hospitalization, prescriptions, eye exams, eyeglasses, dental care" and other services. Services are provided through prepaid health plans, who negotiate reimbursement rates with health care providers.

Public funding covers 94% of the actuarial value cost for a MinnesotaCare plan. Enrollees cover 6% of the plan's cost in the form of cost sharing for services and a monthly premium based on a sliding income scale. As of October 2018, MinnesotaCare monthly premiums range from $0 for those with incomes up to 34% of Federal Poverty Guidelines (FPG) to $12 for those with incomes at 100% FPG to $80 for those at 200% FPG.

In fiscal year 2017, the MinnesotaCare program paid $397.2 million for health care services provided to enrollees. State funds covered less than three percent of the cost.

== Managed care organizations ==
According to Minnesota Department of Human Services, in 2018, the following health plans were available for MinnesotaCare applicants:

- HealthPartners
- Hennepin Health
- Itasca Medical Care
- PrimeWest Health
- South Country Health Alliance
- UCare

== Proposed expansions ==
=== Raising income limit ===
In 2016, State Senator Tony Lourey and State Representative Jennifer Schultz proposed increasing the income limit for MinnesotaCare eligibility from 200% FPG to 275% FPG. This change would have raised the annual income limit for a family of four from $48,600 to $66,825 under 2016 guidelines.

In his 2017 State of the State address, Governor Mark Dayton proposed raising the eligibility limit for MinnesotaCare to 400% FPG. This would have allowed families of four earning up to $98,400 under 2017 guidelines to purchase MinnesotaCare coverage.

=== "Buy in" proposal ===
In 2016, the DFL-controlled Minnesota Senate passed legislation to begin the process of allowing Minnesotans with incomes exceeding the limit for traditional MinnesotaCare to "buy in" to MinnesotaCare coverage.

The 2016 legislation authorized the state to seek federal waivers necessary to allow the program to operate. Operational costs for the program and per member per month premium prices were not disclosed. The proposal did not become law.

With Dayton's support, DFL legislators introduced a similar proposal in 2017.

In 2018, the Dayton administration estimated the average statewide cost of MinnesotaCare buy-in to be $659 per person per month, or $7,908 per year, for a silver-level health plan. Silver-level plans generally qualify as high-deductible plans, with individual deductibles exceeding $3,000 and family deductibles exceeding $11,000.

In comparison, for 2018, the Kaiser Family Foundation estimated the average cost of a privately sold silver-level health plan at $326 per person per month, or $3,912 per year, with similar deductibles.

To start the buy-in program, Dayton proposed spending roughly $100,000,000 in public funding for a financial reserve to back up the government-run insurance option. In addition, his administration estimated $13,000,000 in annual operating costs.

Dayton argued the buy-in plans would be eligible for federal premium tax credits (PTC) for those under 400% FPG, but this would require federal approval. Healthcare experts suggest a buy-in plan would not meet the definition of a "health plan" under federal regulations and therefore would not qualify for PTC.

Dayton left office in January 2019, but Governor Walz continues to support a buy-in option for MinnesotaCare and supported it in his 2018 gubernatorial campaign.

Critics have expressed three primary concerns about a MinnesotaCare buy-in. They argue low healthcare provider reimbursement rates set by the government for MinnesotaCare will cause many providers to reject patients with public option coverage. Were providers mandated to accept public option coverage, they argue, rural hospitals and clinics would be driven to bankruptcy.

Critics have also questioned the feasibility of modifying the state-run MNsure marketplace to sell the buy-in plan due to MNsure's technological deficiencies.

In addition, critics question the affordability of a buy-in based on the Dayton administration's premium estimate, which is more than double current premiums for comparable value plans in the private market.
