= Doron Clark =

American politician, born 1977

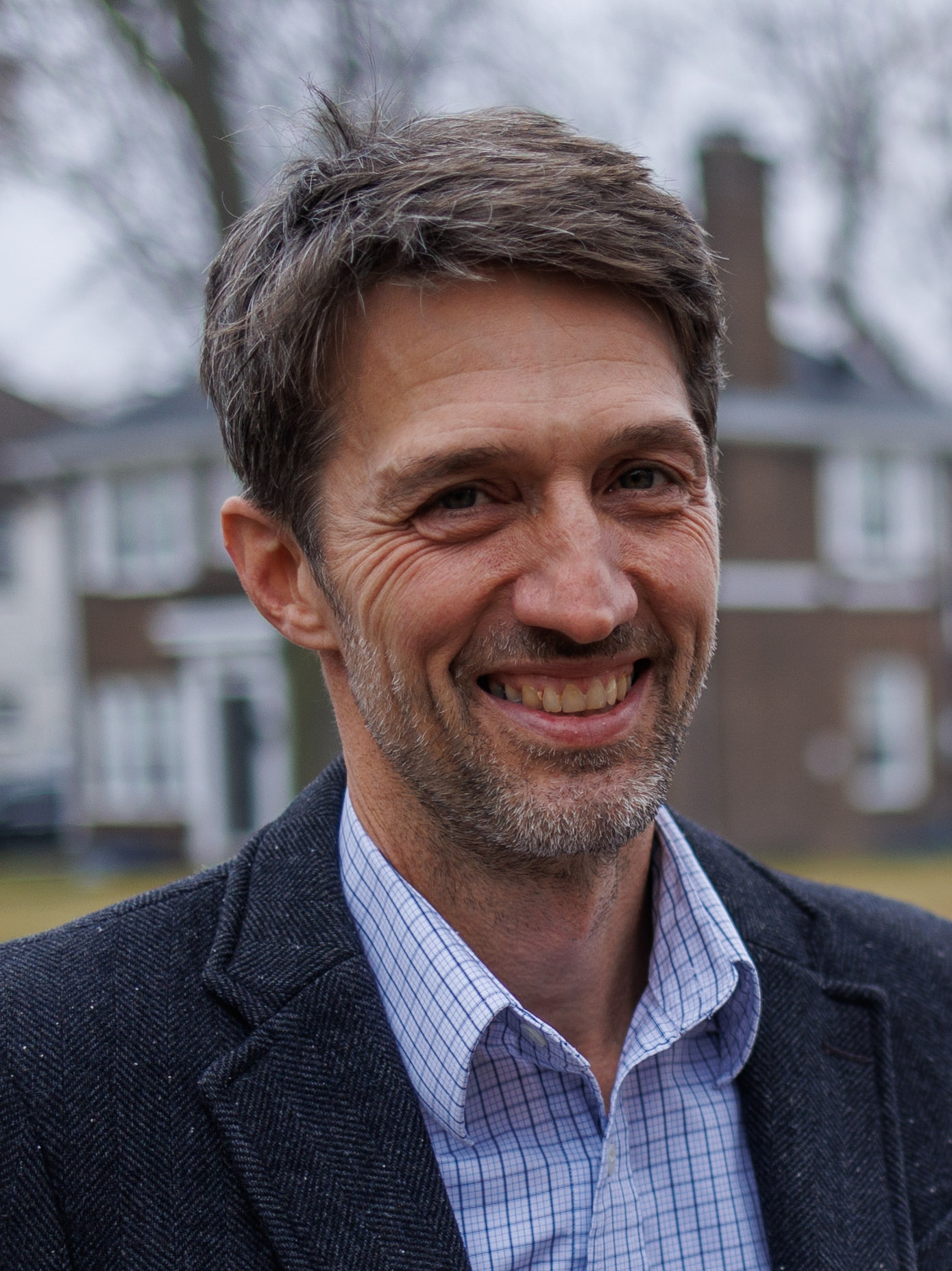
- Clark in 2024

Member of the Minnesota Senate from the 60th district
- Incumbent
- Assumed office February 3, 2025
- Preceded by: Kari Dziedzic

Personal details
- Born: 1977 (age 48–49)
- Party: Democratic (DFL)
- Spouse: Molly
- Children: 2
- Education: Hamline University

Doron Clark (born 1977) is an American politician and member of the Minnesota Senate. A member of the Minnesota Democratic–Farmer–Labor Party (DFL), he represents District 60, which includes parts of Northeast and Southeast Minneapolis in Hennepin County and part of the University of Minnesota.

== Early life, education, and career ==
Clark was born in December 1977 and grew up on a sheep farm near Eyota, Minnesota. He graduated from Hamline University in 2000 with degrees in religion and economics.

Clark began a campaign to represent Ward 1 in the Minneapolis City Council in 2009 but dropped out before candidate filing. Before his election, he worked in the ethics department at Medtronic and served a two-year term as chair of the Senate District 60 DFL.

== Minnesota Senate ==
Clark was elected in a special election on January 28, 2025. On January 14, he won a crowded DFL primary with 38% of the vote. Two weeks later, he defeated Republican nominee Abigail Wolters in the general election with 91% of the vote. He succeeded former Minnesota Senate Majority Leader Kari Dziedzic, who died of ovarian cancer on December 27, 2024. His election returned control of the Minnesota Senate to the DFL with a one-seat majority; the session began with the DFL and the Republican Party tied at 33 seats each.

On February 3, 2025, Clark was sworn in, and the Senate reorganized under DFL leadership. He started the session on the Education Finance, Higher Education, Judiciary and Public Safety, and Housing and Homelessness Prevention Committees.

== Electoral history ==
2025 Senate District 60 special, DFL primary
Party	Candidate	Votes	%
Democratic (DFL)	Doron Clark	2,073	38.13
Democratic (DFL)	Monica Meyer	1,882	34.62
Democratic (DFL)	Peter Wagenius	1,262	23.22
Democratic (DFL)	Amal Karim	93	1.71
Democratic (DFL)	Iris Grace Altamirano	74	1.36
Democratic (DFL)	Joshua Preston	29	0.53
Democratic (DFL)	Emilio César Rodríguez	23	0.42
Total votes		5,436	100

2025 Senate District 60 special election
Party	Candidate	Votes	%
Democratic (DFL)	Doron Clark	7,783	90.91
Republican	Abigail Wolters	746	8.71
Write-in		32	0.37
Total votes		8,561	100

== Personal life ==
Clark lives in Minneapolis with his wife, Molly. He has two daughters. He is a long-distance runner who has competed in multiple marathons and coaches cross country at Yinghua Academy.
