= David Gottfried (politician) =

American politician

Member of the Minnesota House of Representatives from the 40B district
- Incumbent
- Assumed office March 17, 2025
- Preceded by: Jamie Becker-Finn

Personal details
- Born: Roseville, Minnesota, U.S.
- Party: Democratic (DFL)
- Spouse: Haylee
- Education: Saint Olaf College; Humphrey School of Public Affairs

David Gottfried is an American politician. A member of the Minnesota Democratic-Farmer-Labor Party, he has served in the Minnesota House of Representatives since March 18, 2025, representing parts of Ramsey County. Gottfried was first elected by special election.

== Early life, education, and career ==
Gottfried was born in Roseville, Minnesota, and attended Roseville public schools. He received a bachelor's degree in vocal performance from St. Olaf College and a Masters of Public Policy from the Humphrey School of Public Affairs at the University of Minnesota. Before entering electoral politics, Gottfried worked as a pro bono specialist at a local legal firm.

== Minnesota House of Representatives ==
After Representative Jamie Becker-Finn announced her retirement from Minnesota House of Representatives, two candidates emerged for the seat: Gottfried and Curtis Johnson. After the DFL endorsed Johnson, Gottfried withdrew from the race and did not appear on the primary ballot that August. Johnson was elected in November 2024 by over 7,000 votes, but after a judge ruled he did not meet residency requirements in the district, Johnson's election was invalidated and the seat remained vacant.

Governor Tim Walz called a special election for January 28, 2025, and amid a crowded field of candidates, Gottfried won the DFL endorsement. The other candidates then withdrew from the race. After the writ of election was ruled invalid, a new date was set for March 11, 2025, and Gottfried defeated Republican nominee Paul Wikstrom by a 40-point margin. His election returned the Minnesota House of Representatives to a tie between DFL and Republican control after the vacancy had given Republicans a one-seat majority.

Gottfried was sworn in on March 17, 2025. He sits on the Agriculture Finance and Policy, Education Policy, and Environment and Natural Resources Finance and Policy Committees.

== Personal life ==
Gottfried lives in Shoreview, Minnesota, with his wife, Haylee.

== Electoral history ==
2025 House District 40B special election
Party	Candidate	Votes	%	±%
Democratic (DFL)	David Gottfried	9,352	70.15%	+4.96%
Republican	Paul Wikstrom	3,966	29.75%	–4.80%
Write-in		13	0.10%	–0.16%
Total votes		13,331	100.00%	
