= 2006 Minnesota Senate election =

Minnesota Senate election, 2006
- November 7, 2006

All 67 seats in the Minnesota Senate 34 seats needed for a majority
	Majority party	Minority party
Leader	Dean Johnson (lost re-election)	Dick Day
Party	Democratic (DFL)	Republican
Leader since	January 13, 2004	July 9, 1997
Leader's seat	13th–Willmar	26th–Owatonna
Last election	35 seats, 49.69%	31 seats, 45.71%
Seats before	38	29
Seats won	44	23
Seat change	▲6	▼6
Popular vote	1,183,319	925,978
Percentage	55.31%	43.28%
Swing	▲5.62 pp	▼2.43 pp
Majority Leader before election
Dean Johnson
Democratic (DFL)
Elected Majority Leader
Larry Pogemiller
Democratic (DFL)

The 2006 Minnesota Senate election was held in the U.S. state of Minnesota on November 7, 2006, to elect members to the Senate of the 85th and 86th Minnesota Legislatures. A primary election was held in several districts on September 12, 2006.

The Minnesota Democratic–Farmer–Labor Party (DFL) won a majority of seats, remaining the majority party, followed by the Republican Party of Minnesota. The new Legislature convened on January 3, 2007.

== Predictions ==
Source	Ranking	As of
Rothenberg	Safe D	November 4, 2006

== Results ==
Summary of the November 7, 2006 Minnesota Senate election results
Party	Candidates	Votes			Seats		
Party	Candidates	No.	%	∆pp	No.	∆No.	%
Minnesota Democratic–Farmer–Labor Party	66	1,183,319	55.31	▲5.62	44	▲6	65.67
Republican Party of Minnesota	66	925,978	43.28	▼2.43	23	▼6	34.33
Independence Party of Minnesota	7	13,886	0.65	▼2.73	0	Steady	0.00
Green Party of Minnesota	1	5,431	0.25	▼0.64	0	Steady	0.00
Independent	1	5,428	0.25	▲0.13	0	Steady	0.00
Write-in	N/A	5,280	0.25	▲0.08	0	Steady	0.00
Total		2,139,322	100.00	±0.00	67	±0	100.00
Invalid/blank votes		78,496	3.54	▼1.17			
Turnout (out of 3,667,707 eligible voters)		2,217,818	60.47	▼4.42			
Source: Minnesota Secretary of State, Minnesota Legislative Reference Library

== See also ==
- Minnesota House of Representatives election, 2006
- Minnesota gubernatorial election, 2006
- Minnesota elections, 2006
