= Amanda Hemmingsen-Jaeger =

American politician

Member of the Minnesota Senate from the 47th district
- Incumbent
- Assumed office November 18, 2025
- Preceded by: Nicole Mitchell

Member of the Minnesota House of Representatives from the 47A district
- In office January 3, 2023 – November 18, 2025
- Preceded by: Jim Nash
- Succeeded by: Shelley Buck

Personal details
- Born: Rochester, Minnesota, U.S.
- Party: Democratic (DFL)
- Children: 2
- Education: University of Minnesota (BS); Humphrey School of Public Affairs (MS); Iowa State University (MS)
- Occupation: Scientist; Policy analyst; Legislator
- Website: Official website Campaign website

Amanda Hemmingsen-Jaeger is an American politician serving in the Minnesota Senate since 2025. A member of the Minnesota Democratic-Farmer-Labor Party (DFL), Hemmingsen-Jaeger represents District 47 in the eastern Twin Cities metropolitan area, which includes the cities of Woodbury and Maplewood and parts of Ramsey and Washington Counties.

== Early life, education and career ==
Hemmingsen-Jaeger attended Wabasha Public Schools as a child. She got her bachelor's degree in cell biology and development from the University of Minnesota, and her master's in genetics from Iowa State University. Hemmingsen-Jaeger graduated from the Humphrey School of Public Affairs in 2016 with a master's in science, technology and environmental policy.

Hemmingsen-Jaeger worked as a forensic scientist for the Minnesota Bureau of Criminal Apprehension from 2011 to 2020. She has worked as a DVS business analyst and legislative analyst for the Minnesota Department of Public Safety and as a FFAID legislative and policy analyst for the Minnesota Department of Human Services. Hemmingsen-Jaeger also served on a number of state councils, including the Metropolitan Council advisory committee for the Gold Line and the Woodbury for Justice and Equality commission.

== Minnesota House of Representatives ==
Hemmingsen-Jaeger was elected to the Minnesota House of Representatives in 2022. She first ran after redistricting and after two-term DFL incumbent Steve Sandell announced he would not seek reelection.

Hemmingsen-Jaeger serves on the Children and Families Finance and Policy, Climate and Energy Finance and Policy, Health Finance and Policy, and Workforce Development Finance and Policy Committees.

== Minnesota Senate ==
Hemmingsen-Jaeger was elected to the Minnesota Senate in a November 2025 special election to succeed Nicole Mitchell, who resigned after being convicted of burglary charges.

== Electoral history ==
2022 Minnesota State House - District 47A
Party	Candidate	Votes	%
Democratic (DFL)	Amanda Hemmingsen-Jaeger	11,426	60.18
Republican	Bob Lawrence	7,550	39.77
Write-in		10	0.05
Total votes		18,986	100.0
Democratic (DFL) hold			

2024 Minnesota State House - District 47A
Party	Candidate	Votes	%
Democratic (DFL)	Amanda Hemmingsen-Jaeger (incumbent)	14,106	60.62
Republican	Teresa Whitson	9,143	39.29
Write-in		21	0.09
Total votes		23,270	100.00
Democratic (DFL) hold			

2025 Minnesota Senate Special - District 47
Party	Candidate	Votes	%
Democratic (DFL)	Amanda Hemmingsen-Jaeger	13,527	61.69
Republican	Dwight Dorau	8,383	38.23
Write-in		18	0.08
Total votes		21,928	100.0
Democratic (DFL) hold			

== Personal life ==
Hemmingsen-Jaeger lives in Woodbury, Minnesota, with her spouse and their two children.
