= Keri Heintzeman =

American politician

Member of the Minnesota Senate from the 6th district
- Incumbent
- Assumed office May 6, 2025
- Preceded by: Justin Eichorn

Personal details
- Party: Republican
- Spouse: Josh Heintzeman
- Children: 6

Keri Heintzeman is an American politician. A member of the Republican Party, she has served in the Minnesota Senate since May 2025, representing District 6. Heintzeman won a special election for the seat on April 29, 2025, after Senator Justin Eichorn resigned.

She is married to Josh Heintzeman, who represents District 6B in the Minnesota House of Representatives. They have six children and live in Nisswa, Minnesota.

== Electoral history ==
2025 Senate District 6 Special Republican Primary
Party	Candidate	Votes	%
Republican	Keri Heintzeman	3,404	46.77
Republican	John A. Howe	1,127	15.49
Republican	Jennifer Carnahan	812	11.16
Republican	Josh Gazelka	679	9.33
Republican	Steve Cotariu	458	6.29
Republican	Angel Zierden	407	5.59
Republican	Doug Kern	363	4.99
Republican	Matthew Zinda	28	0.38
Total votes		7,278	100.00

2025 Senate District 6 Special Election
Party	Candidate	Votes	%	±%
Republican	Keri Heintzeman	12,751	60.27	−3.23
Democratic (DFL)	Denise Slipy	8,376	39.59	+3.15
Write-in		30	0.14	+0.08
Total votes		21,157	100	N/A
Republican hold				
