= Clare Oumou Verbeten =

American politician

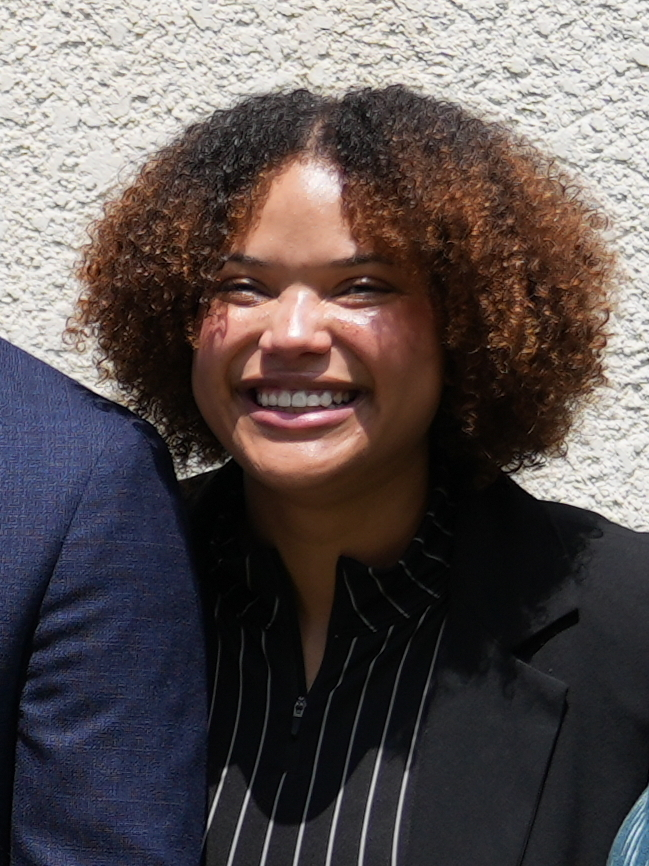

Member of the Minnesota Senate from the 66 district
- Incumbent
- Assumed office January 3, 2023
- Preceded by: John Marty

Personal details
- Born: Minnesota, U.S.
- Party: Democratic (DFL)
- Education: American University (BA)

Clare Oumou Verbeten (/ˈuːmuː vərˈbeɪtən/ OO-moo vər-BAY-tən) is an American politician serving as a member of the Minnesota Senate for the 66th district since 2023. She and Erin Maye Quade were the first openly LGBTQ women and first Black women elected to the Minnesota Senate.

== Early life and education ==
Oumou Verbeten was born and raised in Minnesota. She grew up in Roseville. Her mother is originally from Senegal. Oumou Verbeten earned a Bachelor of Arts degree in law and society from American University in 2016.

== Career ==
As a college student, Oumou Verbeten worked as an intern for the Minnesota Democratic–Farmer–Labor Party, the National Immigrant Women's Advocacy Project, Women Winning, and the Democratic National Committee. She returned to the Minnesota DFL in 2016 as deputy party affairs director. In 2017 and 2018, she was the deputy political director for Tim Walz's gubernatorial campaign. After the campaign, Oumou Verbeten worked as deputy political director of the North Central States Regional Council of Carpenters and as a community affairs specialist for Mortenson Construction. From 2019 to 2022, she served as an equity and inclusion program manager for the city of Saint Paul, Minnesota.

Oumou Verbeten was elected to the State Senate in 2022. During the 93rd Minnesota Legislature, numerous bills she sponsored and supported were enacted, including bills banning no-knock warrants, allowing for free phone calls from prisons, and a cap of five years on probation. She was elected to be an Assistant Majority Leader in March 2024 and serves on the following committees:

- Education Finance
- Higher Education
- Judiciary and Public Safety
- Labor
