= Michael Kreun =

American politician

Member of the Minnesota Senate from the 32nd district
- Incumbent
- Assumed office January 3, 2023
- Preceded by: Mark Koran
- Succeeded by: Chris Ford (elect)

Personal details
- Born: Michael Eugene Kreun
- Party: Republican
- Education: Minnesota State University Moorhead (BA); University of North Dakota (JD)

Michael Eugene Kreun is an American attorney and politician representing the 32nd district in the Minnesota Senate since 2023.

== Education ==
Kreun earned a Bachelor of Arts degree from Minnesota State University Moorhead and a Juris Doctor from the University of North Dakota School of Law.

== Career ==
Outside of politics, Kreun works as a lawyer. He also served as a member of the Spring Lake Park School Board and Coon Creek Watershed Board. Kreun was elected to the Minnesota Senate in November 2022.

He was unseated at the 2026 election by Democrat Chris Ford.
