= Michael Holmstrom Jr. =

American politician

Member of the Minnesota Senate from the 29 district
- Incumbent
- Assumed office November 18, 2025
- Preceded by: Bruce Anderson

Personal details
- Party: Republican
- Website: State Senate website Campaign website

Michael Holmstrom Jr. is an American politician serving since 2025 as a member of the Minnesota Senate. A member of the Republican Party of Minnesota, Holmstrom represents District 29 in central Minnesota, located primarily in Wright County.

== Minnesota Senate ==
Holstrom was elected to the Minnesota Senate in a special election on November 4, 2025. The district was vacated upon the death of Republican Bruce Anderson. After winning the Republican primary election in August 2025, Holstrom defeated DFL nominee Louis McNutt with 62.1% of the vote. He was sworn in on November 18, 2025.

== Electoral history ==
2025 Minnesota Senate district 29 special Republican primary
Party	Candidate	Votes	%
Republican	Michael Holmstrom Jr.	2,090	73.38
Republican	Bradley Kurtz	621	21.80
Republican	Rachel Davis	137	4.81
Total votes		2,848	100.0

2025 Minnesota Senate district 29 special election
Party	Candidate	Votes	%	±%
Republican	Michael Holmstrom Jr.	12,328	62.23%	−5.81%
Democratic (DFL)	Louis McNutt	7,459	37.65%	+5.76%
Write-in		22	0.11%	+0.06%
Total votes		19,809	100.00%	

== Personal life ==
Holmstrom lives in Buffalo, Minnesota.
