= Josh Heintzeman =

American politician

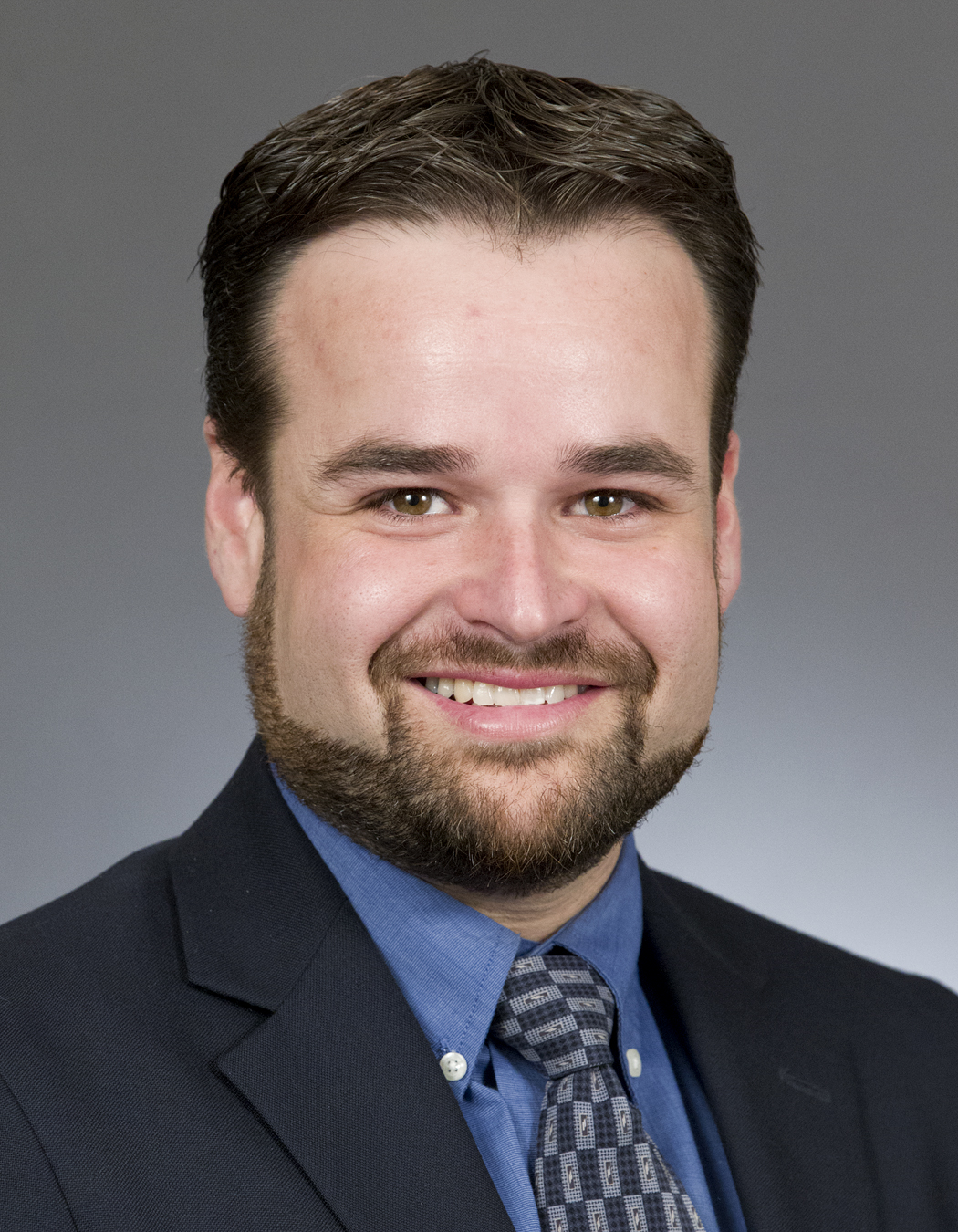

Member of the Minnesota House of Representatives
- Incumbent
- Assumed office January 6, 2015
- Preceded by: John Ward
- Constituency: District 6B (2023–present); District10A (2015–2023)

Personal details
- Born: December 5, 1977 (age 48) Bloomington, Minnesota, U.S.
- Party: Republican
- Spouse: Keri Heintzeman
- Children: 6
- Education: Central Lakes College (AA)
- Occupation: Small business owner; Legislator
- Website: Government website Campaign website

Joshua Heintzeman (/ˈhaɪntsmən/; born December 5, 1977) is a Minnesota politician serving since 2015 in the Minnesota House of Representatives. A member of the Republican Party of Minnesota, Heintzeman represents District 6B, which includes the city of Brainerd and parts of Crow Wing County in central Minnesota.

== Early life, education, and career ==
Heintzeman was born in Bloomington, Minnesota, and his family moved to Motley, Minnesota, when he was an infant. He graduated from Central Lakes College in Brainerd, Minnesota, with an associate degree in business.

Heintzeman served as the Thirty Lakes Watershed District Manager and is a member of the Brainerd Chamber of Commerce. He also chaired the Crow Wing County Human Rights Commission and the Crow Wing County Republicans. He runs a family-owned custom wood interiors business.

== Minnesota House of Representatives ==
Heintzeman was elected to the Minnesota House of Representatives in 2014, defeating four-term DFL incumbent John Ward, and has been reelected every two years since.

Heintzeman serves as the minority lead for the Environment and Natural Resources Finance and Policy Committee and sits on the Legacy Finance and Ways and Means Committees. From 2019 to 2020, he served as an assistant minority leader, and has served on the Legislative-Citizen Commission on Minnesota Resources.

=== Environment and natural resources ===
As co-chair of the Legislative-Citizen Commission on Minnesota Resources, Heintzeman advocated using lottery money proceeds for local public works projects such as wastewater treatment plants, and supported using funding to build a National Loon Center in Crosslake, Minnesota. He authored legislation to fund a field test to detect chronic wasting disease in live deer, and has supported a government buyout of deer farms in the state.

Heintzeman offered an amendment to a 2020 bonding bill that would have blocked efforts to challenge the Enbridge Line 3 pipeline project. He has been critical of Governor Tim Walz's efforts to use rule-making to adopt stricter car emission standards. Heintzeman has opposed state efforts to regulate PFAS chemicals, arguing action should be taken at the federal level.

=== Other political positions ===
Heintzeman said he believes private businesses should have the right to refuse services to same-sex couples, citing religious objections as a reason to deny service. He has voiced concerns over legalizing sports betting in Minnesota due to gambling addiction.

Heintzeman authored legislation to exempt military pensions from state income taxes. He has been critical of the Affordable Care Act. Heintzeman signed on to a letter calling on the University of Minnesota to stop participating in research on "aborted human fetal organs". In 2020, he was targeted by activist Ben Dorr, who posted a video clip confronting Heintzeman with his six-year-old son for allegedly "voting to kill babies".

== Electoral history ==
2014 Minnesota State House - District 10A
Party	Candidate	Votes	%
Republican	Joshua Heintzeman	8,646	53.37
Democratic (DFL)	John Ward (incumbent)	7,539	46.54
Write-in		15	0.09
Total votes		16,200	100.00
Republican gain from Democratic (DFL)			

2016 Minnesota State House - District 10A
Party	Candidate	Votes	%
Republican	Joshua Heintzeman (incumbent)	12,919	59.40
Democratic (DFL)	Quinn Nystrom	8,831	40.60
Write-in		27	0.12
Total votes		21,777	100.0
Republican hold			

2018 Minnesota State House - District 10A
Party	Candidate	Votes	%
Republican	Joshua Heintzeman (incumbent)	11,907	62.23
Democratic (DFL)	Dale Menk	7,211	37.69
Write-in		16	0.08
Total votes		19,134	100.0
Republican hold			

2020 Minnesota State House - District 10A
Party	Candidate	Votes	%
Republican	Joshua Heintzeman (incumbent)	15,674	64.93
Democratic (DFL)	Dale Menk	8,443	34.98
Write-in		23	0.10
Total votes		24,140	100.0
Republican hold			

2022 Minnesota State House - District 6B
Party	Candidate	Votes	%
Republican	Joshua Heintzeman (incumbent)	12,623	65.22
Democratic (DFL)	Sally Boos	6,698	34.61
Write-in		33	0.17
Total votes		19,354	100.0
Republican hold			

== Personal life ==
Heintzeman married his wife, Keri, on June 26, 1999. They have six children and reside in Nisswa, Minnesota. Heintzeman and his wife homeschool their children.
