= Nick Frentz =

American politician (born 1963)

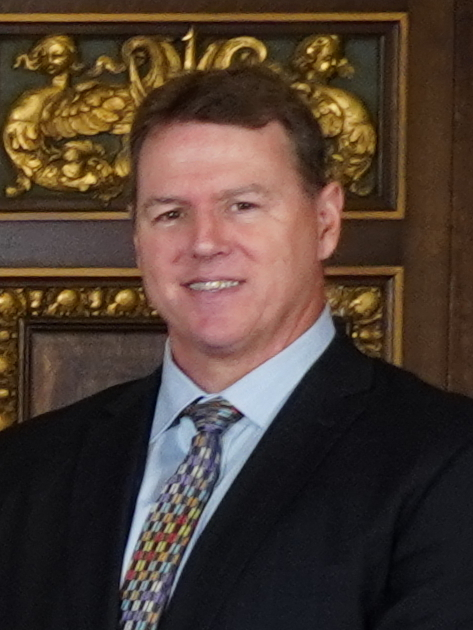

Member of the Minnesota Senate from the 18th district
- Incumbent
- Assumed office January 3, 2023
- Preceded by: Scott Newman

Member of the Minnesota Senate from the 19th district
- In office January 3, 2017 – January 3, 2023
- Preceded by: Kathy Sheran
- Succeeded by: John Jasinski

Personal details
- Born: June 29, 1963 (age 63) Japan
- Party: Democratic (DFL)
- Spouse: Jill (m. 1989)
- Children: 4
- Education: Macalester College (BA); William Mitchell College of Law (JD)

Nick A. Frentz (born June 29, 1963) is an American politician and member of the Minnesota Senate. A member of the Minnesota Democratic–Farmer–Labor Party (DFL), he represents District 18 in south-central Minnesota.

== Early life, education, and career ==
Frentz was born on June 29, 1963, and grew up in Davis, California, where he graduated from high school. He is the son of a Mankato native.

Frentz attended Macalester College, graduating in 1984, and William Mitchell College of Law, graduating in 1987.

Frentz is a partner of Maschka, Riedy, Ries, and Frentz. Previously, he was a partner of Frentz and Frentz Law Offices, founded by his uncle and father, in Mankato. He is also a minority owner of Tandem Bagels, a local bakery and coffeehouse.

== Minnesota Senate ==
Frentz was elected to the Minnesota Senate in 2016. He served as assistant minority leader in 2021-22. In 2023, he became assistant majority leader and chair of the Energy, Utilities, Environment and Climate Committee.

== Personal life ==
Frentz and his wife, Jill, married in 1989. They have four children and reside in North Mankato. He is Lutheran.
