= Minnesota's 19th Senate district =

American legislative district

District 19 is an electoral district of the Minnesota Senate. It covers portions of Hennepin and Wright counties in the northwestern Twin Cities metropolitan area.

== Senators ==
- Amy Koch (January 5, 2006 – present)
- Mark Ourada ( – January 5, 2006)
