= Julia Coleman (politician) =

American politician (born 1991)

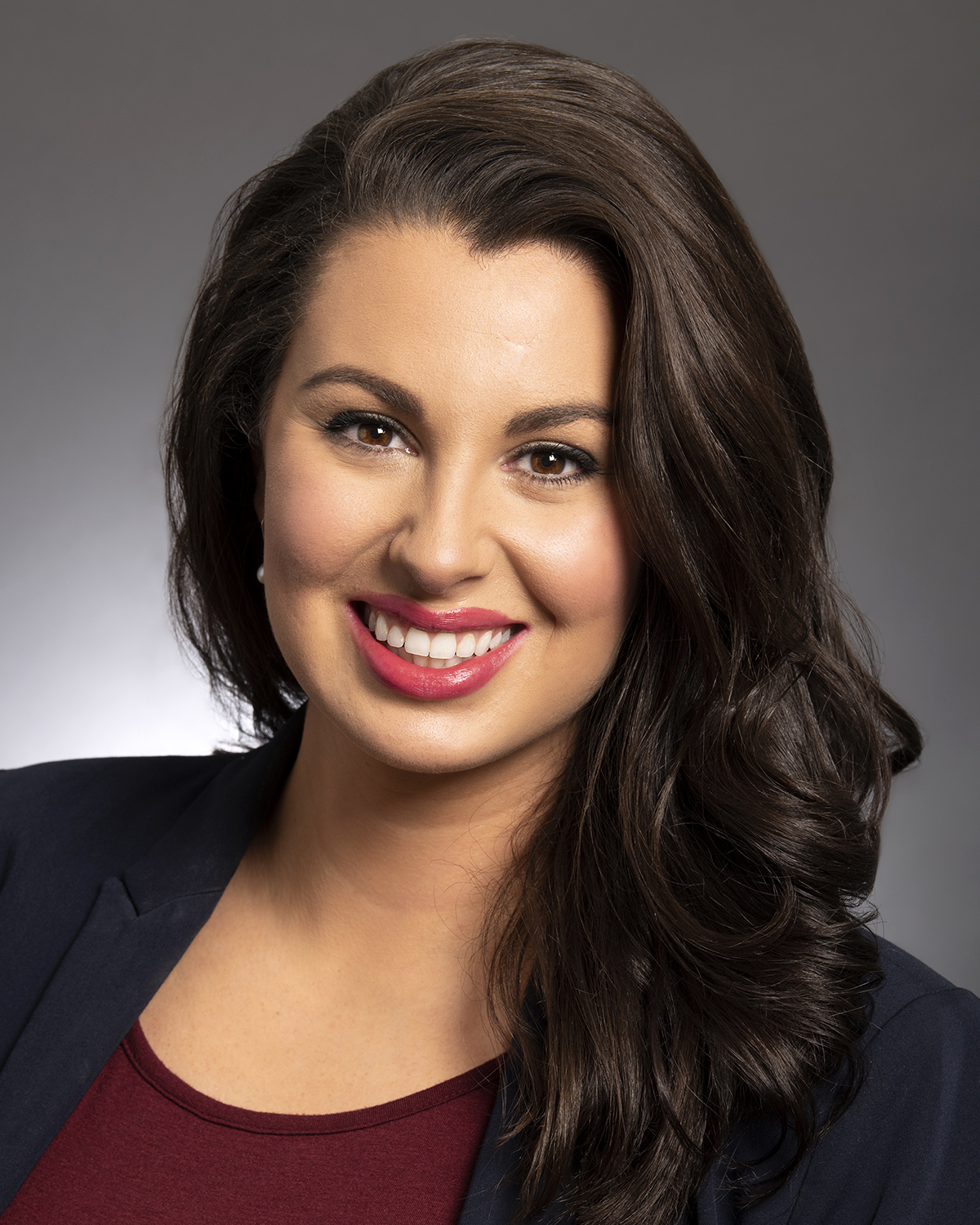

Member of the Minnesota Senate
- Incumbent
- Assumed office January 5, 2021
- Preceded by: Scott Jensen
- Constituency: 47th district (2021–2023); 48th district (2023–present)

Personal details
- Born: Julia Erin Schliesing; December 19, 1991 (age 34)
- Party: Republican
- Spouse: Jacob Coleman (m. 2018)
- Children: 3
- Relatives: Norm Coleman (father-in-law)
- Education: University of Minnesota (BA)

Julia Erin Coleman (née Schliesing; born December 19, 1991) is an American politician and member of the Minnesota Senate. A Republican, she has represented Carver County in the southwestern Twin Cities metropolitan area since 2021.

== Early life, education, and career ==
Coleman was born on December 19, 1991, and raised in Maplewood. She graduated from Hill-Murray School in 2010, and the University of Minnesota, Twin Cities.

== Minnesota Senate ==
In 2018, Coleman was elected to the Chanhassen City Council. Coleman was elected to the Minnesota Senate in 2020, replacing fellow Republican Scott Jensen, who did not seek reelection. She currently serves as Assistant Minority Leader.

== Personal life ==
Coleman and her husband, Jacob, reside in Waconia. They have three children. Coleman is the daughter-in-law of Norm Coleman, a former United States Senator from Minnesota.
