= Minnesota Senate =

Upper house of the Minnesota legislature

Coordinates: 44°57′19″N 93°6′10″W

- 94th Minnesota Legislature

Type
- Type: Upper house of the Minnesota Legislature
- Term limits: None

History
- New session started: January 3, 2023

Leadership
- President: Bobby Joe Champion (DFL) since January 3, 2023
- President pro tempore: Ann Rest (DFL) since January 3, 2023
- Majority Leader: Erin Murphy (DFL) since February 6, 2024
- Minority Leader: Mark Johnson (R) since January 3, 2023

Structure
- Seats: 67
- Political groups: DFL (34); Republican (33)
- Length of term: 4 years when elected in years ending in 2 and 6. 2 years when elected in years ending in 0.
- Authority: Article IV, Minnesota Constitution
- Salary: $51,750/year + per diem

Elections
- Voting system: First-past-the-post
- Last election: November 3, 2026
- Next election: November 5, 2030
- Redistricting: Legislative control

Meeting place
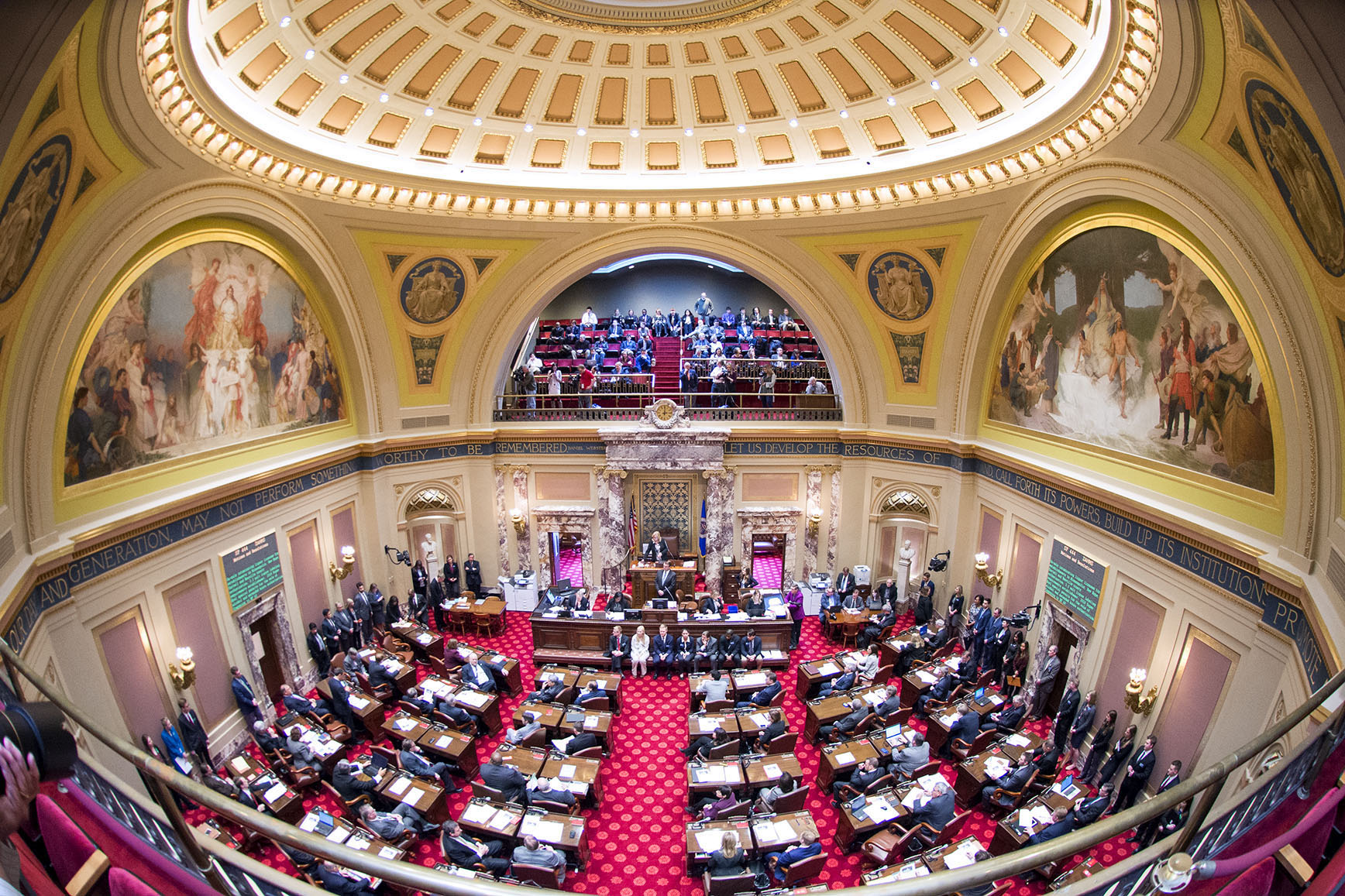
- Senate chamber Minnesota State Capitol; Saint Paul, Minnesota

Website
- https://www.senate.mn/

Rules
- Temporary Rules of the Senate

The Minnesota Senate is the upper house of the legislature of the U.S. state of Minnesota. At 67 members, half as many as the Minnesota House of Representatives, it is the largest upper house of any U.S. state legislature. Floor sessions are held in the west wing of the State Capitol in Saint Paul. Committee hearings, as well as offices for senators and staff, are located north of the State Capitol in the Minnesota Senate Building. Each member of the Minnesota Senate represents approximately 85,000 constituents.

== History ==
The Minnesota Senate held its first regular session on December 2, 1857.

== Powers ==
In addition to its legislative powers, certain appointments by the governor are subject to the Senate's advice and consent. As state law provides for hundreds of executive appointments, the vast majority of appointees serve without being confirmed by the Senate; only in rare instances does the Senate reject appointees. It has rejected only nine executive appointments since 2000.

== Elections ==
Each Senate district is split between an A and B House district (e.g., Senate District 41 contains House districts 41A and 41B). The Minnesota Constitution forbids House districts that are within more than one Senate district.

To account for decennial redistricting, members run for one two-year term and two four-year terms each decade. Senators are elected to four-year terms in years ending in 2 and 6, and to two-year terms in years ending in 0. Districts are redrawn after the decennial United States Census in time for the primary and general elections in years ending in 2. The most recent election was held on November 3, 2026.

== Leadership ==
From statehood through 1972, the lieutenant governor served as president of the Senate. In 1972, voters approved a constitutional amendment that provided for the Senate to elect its own president beginning January 1973. The president, who presides over official Senate proceedings, also acts as the parliamentarian and oversees the secretary of the senate. The majority leader is responsible for managing and scheduling the business of the Senate and oversees partisan and nonpartisan staff. The current majority leader is Erin Murphy, a Democrat from Saint Paul. The current minority leader is Mark Johnson, a Republican from East Grand Forks. Each caucus also selects its own leaders and deputy leaders.

== Minnesota Senate Building ==
Committee hearings mostly take place in the Minnesota Senate Building, a 293,000-square-foot (27,200 m^{2}) office building that opened in January 2016. The $90 million office building, which is north of the State Capitol across University Avenue, includes three committee hearing rooms, offices for all senators and staff, a raised terrace overlooking the State Capitol, and a 264-space underground parking facility.

The 2016 session was held in the newly constructed Minnesota Senate Building due to an extensive restoration at the State Capitol. It was the first time the Senate held a regular session outside the Capitol since it opened in 1905.

== Composition ==
=== Historical composition ===
Years	Party (Shading indicates majority caucus)			Total	Vacant
Years	Democratic– Farmer–Labor	Republican	Independent	Total	Vacant
2001–2003	41	25	0	67	0
2003–2007	35	31	0	67	0
2007–2011	44	23	0	67	0
2011–2013	30	37	0	67	0
2013–2017	39	28	0	67	0
2017-2021	33	34	0	67	0
2021–2023	31	34	2 (Note: Caucused with Republicans)	67	0
2023–2027	34	33	0	67	0

=== Current composition ===
94th Minnesota Legislature (2025-2027)

	Party (Shading indicates majority caucus)			Total	Vacant
	Republican	Independent	Democratic– Farmer–Labor	Total	Vacant
End of the previous Legislature	34	1	31	66	1
Begin 2023	33	0	34	67	0
December 27, 2024 (Note: Democrat Kari Dziedzic (District 60) died.)	33	0	33	66	1
February 3, 2025 (Note: Democrat Doron Clark seated to succeed Dziedzic. Elected in a special election on January 28, 2025.)	33	0	34	67	0
March 20, 2025 (Note: Republican Justin Eichorn (District 6) resigned on March 20, 2025, after being arrested during a sting operation on suspicion of soliciting a minor for sex.)	32	0	34	66	1
May 6, 2025 (Note: Republican Keri Heintzeman sworn in to succeed Eichorn.)	33	0	34	67	0
July 21, 2025 (Note: Republican Bruce Anderson (District 29) died.)	32	0	34	66	1
July 25, 2025 (Note: Democrat Nicole Mitchell (District 47) resigned after being convicted of felony burglary charges.)	32	0	33	65	2
November 18, 2025 (Note: Republican Michael Holmstrom Jr. and Democrat Amanda Hemmingsen-Jaeger were sworn in to succeed Anderson and Mitchell, respectively.)	33	0	34	67	0
Latest voting share	49.3%		50.7%		

=== Current members ===
Senate districts Republican DFL

District	Name	Party	Residence	Start
1	Mark Johnson	Republican	East Grand Forks	2016
2	Steve Green	Republican	Fosston	2022
3	Grant Hauschild	DFL	Hermantown	2022
4	Rob Kupec	DFL	Moorhead	2022
5	Paul Utke	Republican	Park Rapids	2016
6	Keri Heintzeman	Republican	Nisswa	2025 (Note: Elected in a special election.)
7	Robert Farnsworth	Republican	Hibbing	2022
8	Jen McEwen	DFL	Duluth	2020
9	Jordan Rasmusson	Republican	Fergus Falls	2022
10	Nathan Wesenberg	Republican	Little Falls	2022
11	Jason Rarick	Republican	Pine City	2019
12	Torrey Westrom	Republican	Alexandria	2012
13	Jeff Howe	Republican	Rockville	2018
14	Aric Putnam	DFL	St. Cloud	2020
15	Gary Dahms	Republican	Redwood Falls	2010
16	Andrew Lang	Republican	Olivia	2016
17	Glenn Gruenhagen	Republican	Glencoe	2022
18	Nick Frentz	DFL	North Mankato	2016
19	John Jasinski	Republican	Faribault	2016
20	Steve Drazkowski	Republican	Mazeppa	2022
21	Bill Weber	Republican	Luverne	2012
22	Rich Draheim	Republican	Madison Lake	2016
23	Gene Dornink	Republican	Hayfield	2020
24	Carla Nelson	Republican	Rochester	2010
25	Liz Boldon	DFL	Rochester	2022
26	Jeremy Miller	Republican	Winona	2010
27	Andrew Mathews	Republican	Milaca	2016
28	Mark Koran	Republican	North Branch	2016
29	Michael Holmstrom Jr.	Republican	Buffalo	2025
30	Eric Lucero	Republican	Saint Michael	2022
31	Cal Bahr	Republican	East Bethel	2022
32	Michael Kreun	Republican	Blaine	2022
33	Karin Housley	Republican	Stillwater	2012
34	John Hoffman	DFL	Champlin	2012
35	Jim Abeler	Republican	Anoka	2016
36	Heather Gustafson	DFL	Vadnais Heights	2022
37	Warren Limmer	Republican	Maple Grove	1995
38	Susan Pha	DFL	Brooklyn Park	2022
39	Mary Kunesh	DFL	New Brighton	2020
40	John Marty	DFL	Roseville	1986
41	Judy Seeberger	DFL	Afton	2022
42	Bonnie Westlin	DFL	Plymouth	2022
43	Ann Rest	DFL	New Hope	2000
44	Tou Xiong	DFL	Maplewood	2022
45	Ann Johnson Stewart	DFL	Minnetonka	2024
46	Ron Latz	DFL	St. Louis Park	2006
47	Amanda Hemmingsen-Jaeger	DFL	Woodbury	2025
48	Julia Coleman	Republican	Chanhassen	2020
49	Steve Cwodzinski	DFL	Eden Prairie	2016
50	Alice Mann	DFL	Edina	2022
51	Melissa Halvorson Wiklund	DFL	Bloomington	2012
52	Jim Carlson (Note: Carlson previously served in the state senate from 2006–2010.)	DFL	Eagan	2012
53	Matt Klein	DFL	Mendota Heights	2016
54	Eric Pratt	Republican	Prior Lake	2012
55	Lindsey Port	DFL	Burnsville	2020
56	Erin Maye Quade	DFL	Apple Valley	2022
57	Zach Duckworth	Republican	Lakeville	2020
58	Bill Lieske	Republican	Lonsdale	2022
59	Bobby Joe Champion	DFL	Minneapolis	2012
60	Doron Clark	DFL	Minneapolis	2025
61	Scott Dibble	DFL	Minneapolis	2002
62	Omar Fateh	DFL	Minneapolis	2020
63	Zaynab Mohamed	DFL	Minneapolis	2022
64	Erin Murphy	DFL	Saint Paul	2020
65	Sandy Pappas	DFL	Saint Paul	1990
66	Clare Oumou Verbeten	DFL	Saint Paul	2022
67	Foung Hawj	DFL	Saint Paul	2012

== Committees ==
Minnesota Senate Committee Assignments, 94th Legislature
Committee	Chair	Vice Chair	Ranking Minority Member
Agriculture, Veterans, Broadband, and Rural Development	Aric Putnam	Rob Kupec	Torrey Westrom
Agriculture, Veterans, Broadband, and Rural Development - Subcommittee on Veterans	Aric Putnam	None	None
Capital Investment	Sandy Pappas	Susan Pha	Karin Housley
Commerce and Consumer Protection	Matt Klein	Judy Seeberger	Gary Dahms
Education Finance	Mary Kunesh	Heather Gustafson	Jason Rarick
Education Policy	Steve Cwodzinski	Erin Maye Quade	Julia Coleman
Elections	Jim Carlson	Bonnie Westlin	Mark Koran
Energy, Utilities, Environment, and Climate	Nick Frentz	Tou Xiong	Andrew Mathews
Environment, Climate, and Legacy	Foung Hawj	Jen McEwen	Steve Green
Finance	John Marty	Nick Frentz	Eric Pratt
Health and Human Services	Melissa Wiklund	Alice Mann	Paul Utke
Higher Education	Omar Fateh	Aric Putnam	Zach Duckworth
Housing and Homelessness Prevention	Lindsey Port	Liz Boldon	Eric Lucero
Human Services	John Hoffman	Omar Fateh	Jordan Rasmusson
Jobs and Economic Development	Bobby Joe Champion	Zaynab Mohamed	Rich Draheim
Judiciary and Public Safety	Ron Latz	Clare Oumou Verbeten	Warren Limmer
Labor	Jen McEwen	Grant Hauschild	Gene Dornink
Rules and Administration	Erin Murphy	Ann Rest	Mark Johnson
State and Local Government	Tou Xiong	Heather Gustafson, Erin Maye Quade	Andrew Lang
Taxes	Ann Rest	Matt Klein	Bill Weber
Transportation	Scott Dibble	Ann Johnson Stewart	John Jasinski

== See also ==
- Minnesota House of Representatives
- Minnesota Legislature
- Past composition of the Senate
  - Political party strength in Minnesota
- List of Minnesota state legislatures
