= Ethan Cha =

American politician

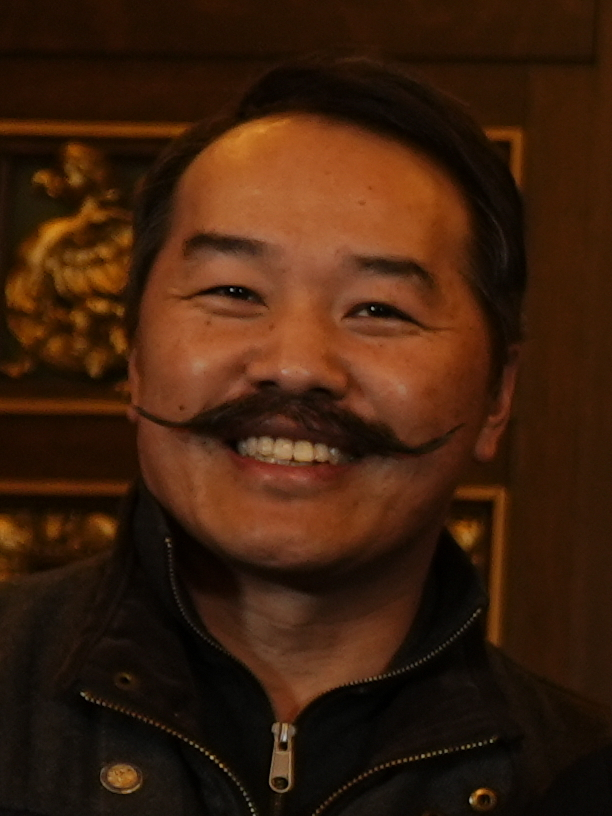

Member of the Minnesota House of Representatives from the 47B district
- Incumbent
- Assumed office January 3, 2023
- Preceded by: redistricted

Personal details
- Party: Democratic (DFL)
- Children: 3
- Occupation: Legislator
- Website: Government website Campaign website

Ethan Cha is an American politician serving in the Minnesota House of Representatives since 2023. A member of the Minnesota Democratic-Farmer-Labor Party (DFL), Cha represents District 47B in the southeast Twin Cities metropolitan area, which includes the city of Woodbury and parts of Washington County.

== Early life, education, and career ==
Cha was born in a Thai refugee camp and immigrated to the United States as a child. He grew up in Minnesota and attended Saint Paul public schools, where he learned English.

Cha lived in California for many years and moved back to Minnesota in 2021 to care for his elderly parents.

== Minnesota House of Representatives ==
Cha was elected to the Minnesota House of Representatives in 2022. He first ran in an open seat after the 2022 legislative redistricting and defeated former state representative Kelly Fenton, who represented Woodbury from 2015 to 2019.

Cha sits on the Agriculture Finance and Policy, Commerce Finance and Policy, Housing Finance and Policy, and Legacy Finance Committees.

Cha, who is Hmong, is the chair of the Minnesota Asian and Pacific Caucus in the Minnesota Legislature, which advocated for an anti-hate crime bill in the wake of an increase in anti-East-Asian sentiment related to COVID-19's origins.

=== Political positions ===
Cha ran on a platform concentrating on education, combatting climate change, and defending abortion access.

== Electoral history ==
2022 Minnesota State House - District 47B
Party	Candidate	Votes	%
Democratic (DFL)	Ethan Cha	10,627	53.13
Republican	Kelly Fenton	9,362	46.81
Write-in		13	0.06
Total votes		20,002	100.0
Democratic (DFL) hold			

2024 Minnesota State House - District 47B
Party	Candidate	Votes	%
Democratic (DFL)	Ethan Cha	14,202	54.41
Republican	Dwight Dorau	11,867	45.46
Write-in		35	0.13
Total votes		26,104	100.0
Democratic (DFL) hold			

== Personal life ==
Cha lives in Woodbury, Minnesota, and has three children, He identifies as Hmong.
