= Nicole Mitchell (politician) =

American politician and meteorologist

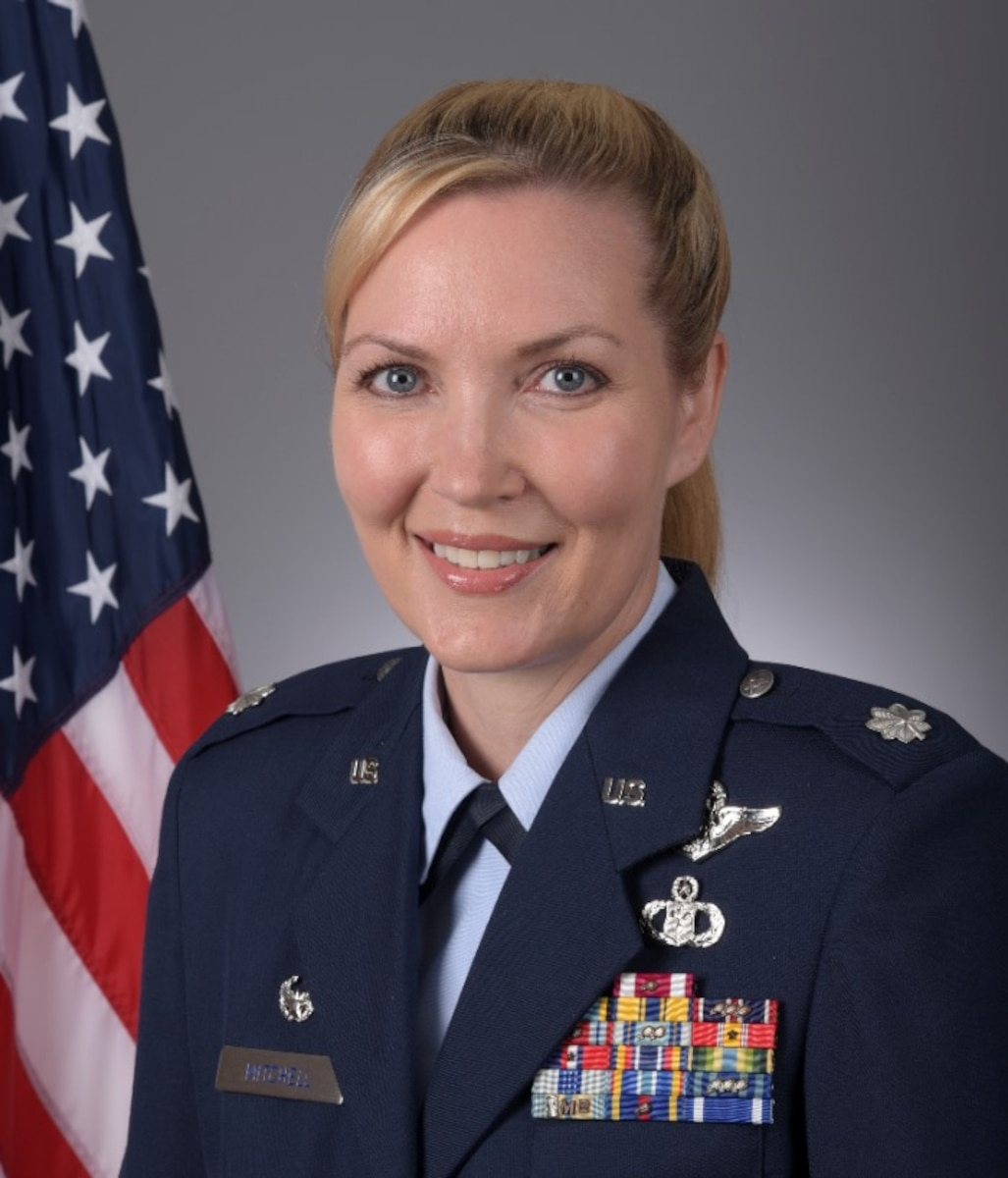
- U.S. Air Force official portrait, 2021

Member of the Minnesota Senate from the 47th district
- In office January 3, 2023 – July 25, 2025
- Preceded by: Susan Kent (redistricted)
- Succeeded by: Amanda Hemmingsen-Jaeger

Personal details
- Born: Nicole Lynn Mitchell; October 10, 1974 (age 52) Fargo, North Dakota, U.S.
- Party: Democratic (DFL)
- Education: Air University; University of Minnesota (BA); Georgia State University (JD)

Military service
- Allegiance: United States
- Branch/service: United States Air Force
- Years of service: 1992–2024
- Rank: Lieutenant Colonel
- Unit: Minnesota Air National Guard; United States Air Force Reserve; Wisconsin Air National Guard
- Commands: 126th Weather Flight
- Battles/wars: War in Afghanistan; Iraq War
- Awards: Master Officers' Aircrew Badge; Master Meteorologist Badge; Meritorious Service Medal (with 2 bronze oak leaf clusters); Aerial Achievement Medal (with 1 silver oak leaf clusters); Air and Space Commendation Medal; Combat Readiness Medal (with 1 bronze oak leaf cluster); Air Reserve Forces Meritorious Service Medal (with 2 bronze oak leaf clusters)

Nicole Lynn Mitchell (born October 10, 1974) is an American politician, military officer, and meteorologist. She represented the cities of Woodbury and Maplewood in the Minnesota Senate as a member of the Minnesota Democratic–Farmer–Labor Party until her resignation on July 25, 2025. Mitchell was also a lieutenant colonel in the Wisconsin Air National Guard, commanding the 126th Weather Flight, and previously served in the United States Air Force Reserve and the Minnesota Air National Guard.

Before entering politics, Mitchell was a broadcast news meteorologist. She worked at the Weather Channel from 2004 to 2011 and with Al Jazeera America from 2013 to 2016. After some time as a freelance meteorologist at CBS News (working at WCBS-TV in New York City and WFOR-TV in Miami), she returned to her home state of Minnesota in 2017 to become a meteorologist for KSTP-TV in the Minneapolis–Saint Paul media market. She also appeared on Minnesota Public Radio.

In 2022, Mitchell was elected as a state senator for District 47. In 2025, she resigned from the Minnesota Legislature after she was convicted of felony burglary charges for breaking into her stepmother's home. Following the conviction, she also retired from U.S. Air Force in late 2024 in order to receive honorable discharge.

In 2026, Mitchell ran for a seat on the Woodbury City Council and was elected.

== Early life ==
Mitchell was born in Fargo, North Dakota. Her family later moved to Woodbury, Minnesota, where she graduated from Woodbury High School in 1992. She studied meteorology at the Community College of the Air Force of Air University and earned a BA in communications from the University of Minnesota.

== Military career ==
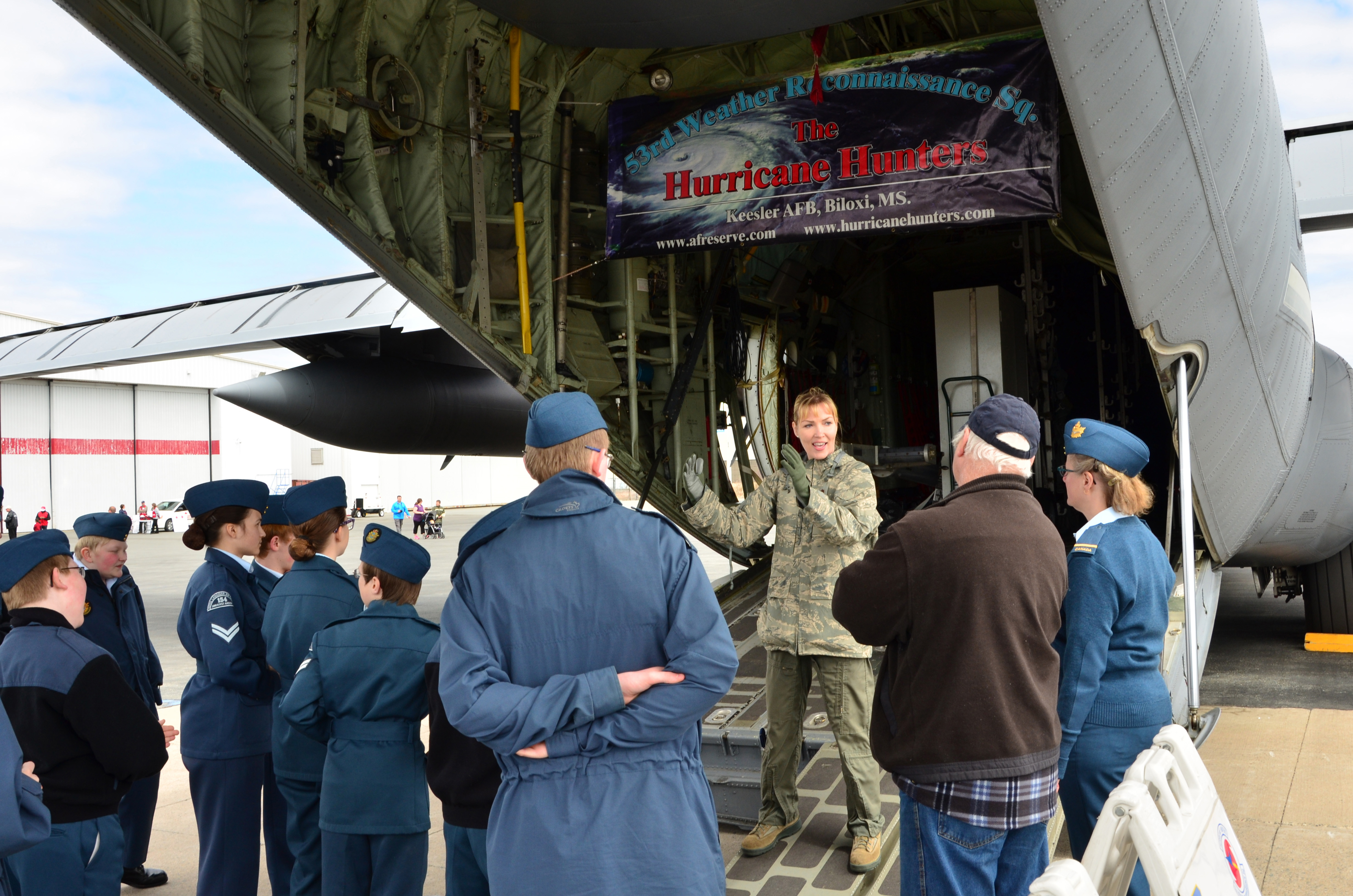
Mitchell briefing Royal Canadian Air Cadets in 2015

Mitchell served in the United States Air Force Reserve (USAFR) and Air National Guard (ANG). She enlisted in the Minnesota ANG in 1992 and reached the rank of technical sergeant before commissioning into the USAFR in 2002. She was assigned to the 53rd Weather Reconnaissance Squadron—commonly known as the "Hurricane Hunters"—at Keesler Air Force Base, Mississippi, as an aerial reconnaissance weather officer, attaining over 1,700 aircrew hours in the WC-130. Mitchell remained in the USAFR until 2019, attaining the rank of major. She then joined the Wisconsin ANG, assuming command of the 126th Weather Flight at Volk Field Air National Guard Base and being promoted to lieutenant colonel in 2020.

Mitchell earned, among other awards, the Meritorious Service Medal (with two bronze oak leaf clusters denoting three awards), Aerial Achievement Medal (with one silver oak leaf cluster denoting six awards), and the Air and Space Commendation Medal.

== Meteorology career ==
=== The Weather Channel ===
Mitchell began working with The Weather Channel in 2004. She co-anchored the channel's morning show, Your Weather Today, from 2004 to 2008. She then moved to co-host of Evening Edition alongside Paul Goodloe from 2008 to 2010.

The Weather Channel terminated Mitchell in 2011. She filed a lawsuit against the channel in the United States District Court for the Northern District of Georgia in 2011, alleging that she had been terminated because the new owners disapproved of the time required by her simultaneous duties as a captain in the Air Force Reserve Command as part of the "Hurricane Hunters" team.

=== Al Jazeera America ===
In 2013, Mitchell began work on the weather team at Al Jazeera America. Mitchell delivered the weather segments in the morning from 7:00 a.m. to 9:00 a.m. Eastern Time and during large weather events. She was the chief meteorologist of the channel until it ceased operation on April 12, 2016.

=== CBS News ===
Beginning in the spring of 2016, Mitchell freelanced with CBS News, appearing on WCBS-TV in New York City, along with contributions to the national network show CBS This Morning. She also traveled south to Miami, filling in for Lissette Gonzalez at WFOR-TV while she was on maternity leave.

=== KSTP-TV Minneapolis-Saint Paul ===
Mitchell returned to her home state of Minnesota to join the Minneapolis-Saint Paul station KSTP-TV in 2017. She appeared on a variety of KSTP newscasts as a freelance meteorologist.

=== Minnesota Public Radio ===
Mitchell appeared on the Minnesota Public Radio (MPR) show Morning Edition from November 2019 to January 2022, in the role of meteorologist alongside anchor Cathy Wurzer. On January 7, 2022, she announced on Twitter that she was leaving MPR to explore a candidacy for the Minnesota Senate.

== Political career ==
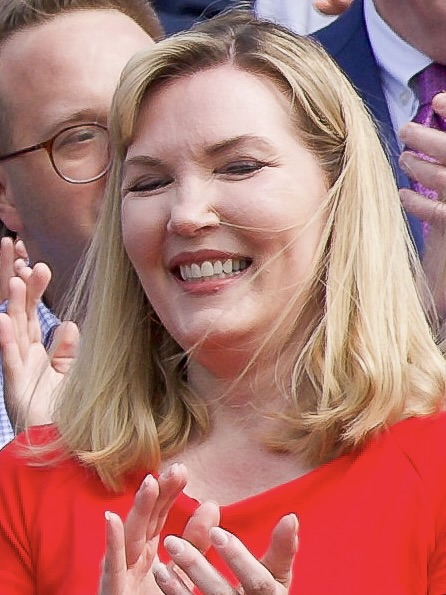
Mitchell in 2023

Mitchell ran as the Democratic–Farmer–Labor Party candidate for District 47 in the 2022 Minnesota Senate election. She defeated Republican candidate Dwight Dorau by winning 58.1 percent of the vote to 41.2 percent. She served a portion of her four-year term from 2023 until resignation in 2025. She represented the cities of Woodbury and Maplewood.

== Arrest and conviction ==
On April 22, 2024, Mitchell was arrested at 4:45 a.m. in Detroit Lakes, Minnesota, by police who were responding to a burglary call. The following day she was charged with first-degree burglary. According to the charging documents, she entered her stepmother's home in an attempt to steal several items. Mitchell stated that she was only interested in things that were of "sentimental value" to her, which included the ashes of her late father. Mitchell's stepmother disputed Mitchell's statement and said that she was fearful of Mitchell.

Senate Democrats stripped Mitchell of committee assignments but did not express support for her resignation. State DFL chairman Ken Martin stated that he would like her to resign by June 8, allowing her seat to be filled in a special election. Mitchell stated that she would not resign, and continued to vote in the 2024 legislative session.

Mitchell was subjected to a Senate ethics inquiry on May 7. The committee declined to take any actions until after her court appearance on June 10. The following week, Republicans in the Minnesota State Senate introduced a motion to expel her, but the motion failed, with Mitchell providing the tie-breaking vote. In mid-2024, the Minnesotan conservative news website Alpha News sued the Detroit Lakes Police Department to compel the release of the body-worn camera footage of Mitchell's arrest. Becker County District Court Judge Gretchen D. Thilmony initially denied the request, citing the potential for the footage to prejudice the jury against Mitchell. In April 2025, the Minnesota Court of Appeals reversed Thilmony's decision and remanded the case, ordering the lower court to "apply a different balancing test". The prosecution then used the footage in its case against Mitchell, rendering it a de facto public record, and it was released publicly shortly thereafter. The recording shows an "intruder dressed all in black beside [the victim's] bed" who was "[the victim's] stepdaughter, Nicole". When confronted by law enforcement officers, Mitchell surrendered peacefully and said she had done "something bad".

On August 8, 2025, a popular crime-focused YouTube Channel released the bodycam footage from the night Mitchell was caught burglarizing the home of Mitchell's Stepmother. In the bodycam footage, it shows police finding Mitchell in the basement by police dressed in a 'Lego Burglar' looking fashion, with all black clothing topped with a black beanie. Further in the bodycam video, a black backpack was found halfway wedged through the basement window. In the backpack, two stolen laptops were found. One was a personal laptop, the other being a State of Michigan employee laptop. The contents of the two laptops are not known.

=== Trial, conviction, and resignation ===
In July 2025, Mitchell stood trial in Becker County, where she was found guilty on charges of first-degree burglary and felony possession of burglary tools. Following her conviction, she resigned from the Minnesota Senate effective July 25.

=== Sentencing and release ===
On September 23, 2025, Becker County Judge Michael Fritz sentenced Mitchell to 180 days in county jail. Mitchell's defense team requested that the judge stay the sentence until they could appeal it; Fritz declined, saying, "there is no reason [...] to believe [the sentence] would be overturned" and that it "remains good law". The defense further requested that the court reduce Mitchell's two felony convictions to misdemeanors; Fritz declined, saying, "There is no legal authority that allows or instructs this court to weigh those consequences and reduce the criminal sentence mandated by statute." Fritz did authorize Mitchell for a work release program, which would permit her to leave the jail during the day to work and return in the evening. He also permitted Mitchell to serve her time in Ramsey County, rather than Becker County, where the crime occurred and where she was convicted. Mitchell's attorney reported that Mitchell has "struggled to find work" but did "recently land a job in fast food". Mitchell began her sentence in October 2025.

Mitchell was released early from her 180-day sentence on January 25, 2026. She appealed both her criminal conviction and the $26,318.03 restitution she was ordered to pay the victim.

== Woodbury City Council ==
During the November 2026 elections, Mitchell was elected to the Woodbury City Council. She finished 2nd in a 10-person field, defeating incumbent City Council Member Steve Morris by 101 votes.

== Personal life ==
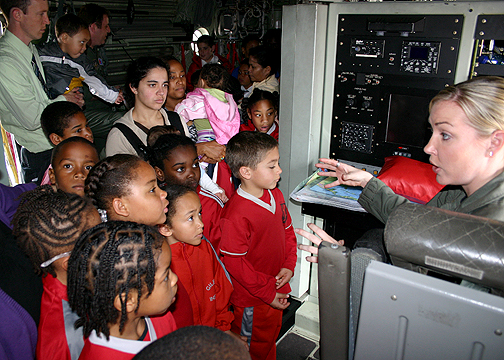
Mitchell making a presentation to schoolchildren in Bermuda in 2010

Mitchell has volunteered with Big Brothers Big Sisters of America and as a Court Appointed Special Advocate (CASA) for abused and neglected children. She was a licensed foster care provider. She received her Juris Doctor degree from the Georgia State University College of Law in 2010.

== See also ==
- Minnesota National Guard
