= Xp Lee =

American politician

- Lee in 2026

Member of the Minnesota House of Representatives from the 34B district
- Incumbent
- Assumed office September 26, 2025
- Preceded by: Melissa Hortman

Member of the Brooklyn Park City Council for the East District
- In office February 22, 2022 – December 31, 2024
- Preceded by: Lisa Jacobson
- Succeeded by: Amanda Cheng Xiong

Personal details
- Born: Xiongpao Lee; December 1978 (age 47) Nong Khai, Thailand
- Party: Democratic (DFL)
- Education: University of South Carolina, Upstate (BA)

Xiongpao "Xp" Lee (pronounced /ˈɛks ˈpiː/; born December 1978) is an American politician serving since 2025 in the Minnesota House of Representatives. A member of the Minnesota Democratic–Farmer–Labor Party (DFL), Lee has represented District 34B since winning a special election after the assassination of Melissa Hortman. He was previously a city council member in Brooklyn Park.

== Early life and career ==
Lee was born in a refugee camp in Nong Khai, Thailand, in December 1978 after his Hmong family was displaced from Laos during the Vietnam War. He spent part of his childhood in California before his family moved to South Carolina, where his father worked as a mechanic. He earned a bachelor's degree in graphic design from the University of South Carolina Upstate.

Lee moved to Minnesota after graduating from college, becoming involved in the nonprofit community and volunteering at the Center for Hmong Arts and Talent. He founded the Hmong American Census Network to work on outreach efforts in the Hmong-American community for the 2020 United States census. He then worked at the Minnesota Department of Health as a community coordinator during the COVID-19 pandemic, and as a policy and special programs manager for the Minnesota Council on Foundations.

== Political career ==
=== Brooklyn Park City Council ===
In 2022, Lee ran for a special election to the Brooklyn Park City Council to serve the remainder of Lisa Jacobson's term after she was elected mayor. At the time, he served as a member of the city's planning commission. He placed first with 45.5% of the vote, defeating LaDawn Severin, Benjamin Osemenam, and Abraham Bah. His election marked the first time the city's councilmembers were majority nonwhite.

Lee did not run for reelection to Brooklyn Park City Council in 2024, and was succeeded by Amanda Cheng Xiong.

=== Minnesota House of Representatives ===
Lee won the 2025 special election in District 34B of the Minnesota House of Representatives, taking 60.9% of the vote over Republican nominee Ruth Bittner. The seat became vacant upon the June 14, 2025, assassination of incumbent representative Melissa Hortman. Lee received the DFL's endorsement and won the primary election on August 12.

Lee named healthcare, education, and infrastructure among his top priorities, and supports a planned biotechnology district in Brooklyn Park, the conversion of Minnesota State Highway 252 to a freeway, and the planned extension of Metro Transit's light rail Blue Line.

== Electoral history ==
=== Brooklyn Park City Council (2022) ===
2022 Brooklyn Park City Council East District special election results
Candidate	Votes	%
Xp Lee	803	45.54%
LaDawn Severin	596	33.81%
Benjamin Osemenam	186	10.55%
Abraham Bah	178	10.10%
Total votes	1,763	100.00%

=== Minnesota House (2025) ===
2025 Minnesota House of Representatives District 34B special DFL primary election results
Party	Candidate	Votes	%
Democratic (DFL)	Xp Lee	1,186	59.15%
Democratic (DFL)	Christian Eriksen	489	24.39%
Democratic (DFL)	Erickson Saye	330	16.46%
Total votes		2,005	100.0%

2025 Minnesota House of Representatives District 34B special election results
Party	Candidate	Votes	%	±%
Democratic (DFL)	Xp Lee	4,331	60.9%	−2.26
Republican	Ruth Bittner	2,785	39.1%	+2.37
Write-in		5	0.07%	-0.11
Total votes		7,116	100%	
Democratic (DFL) hold				
