= Bruce Anderson (politician) =

American politician (1950–2025)

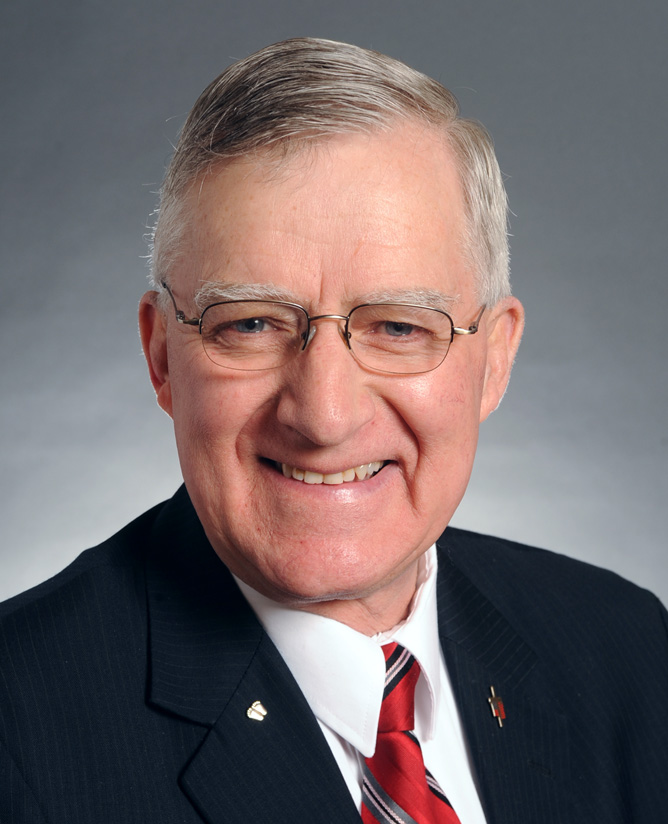
- Official portrait, 2012

Member of the Minnesota Senate from the 29th district
- In office January 8, 2013 – July 21, 2025
- Preceded by: Amy Koch (redistricted)
- Succeeded by: Michael Holmstrom Jr.

Member of the Minnesota House of Representatives
- In office January 3, 1995 – January 7, 2013
- Preceded by: Stephanie Klinzing
- Succeeded by: Marion O'Neill (redistricted)
- Constituency: District 19B (1995–2003); District 19A (2003–2013)

Personal details
- Born: Bruce Douglas Anderson; March 12, 1950 Saint Paul, Minnesota, U.S.
- Died: July 21, 2025 (aged 75)
- Party: Republican
- Spouse(s): Dottie (died 2006) Ruth
- Children: 8
- Education: North Hennepin Junior College; Willmar Technical College (AA); Crown College; Northwestern College (BA)

Bruce Douglas Anderson (March 12, 1950 – July 21, 2025) was an American politician and member of the Minnesota Senate. A member of the Republican Party of Minnesota, he represented District 29, which includes portions of Hennepin and Wright Counties in central Minnesota.

== Early life, education, and career ==
Anderson attended North Hennepin Junior College in Brooklyn Park in 1968–69, and received aviation electronics training during his time in the United States Navy in 1970–73. He received an A.A. in agribusiness from Willmar Technical College in 1976, and later earned a B.S. in business management from Northwestern College. He was a sales manager for Centra Sota Cooperative from 1976 to 1986. He was a member of the Minnesota Governor's Advisory Board for Technology for Persons with Disabilities in the 1990s.

Anderson was a member of the Minnesota Air National Guard, and a former Master Sergeant in the United States Air National Guard. He was the 1990 Republican-endorsed candidate for the United States House of Representatives in the old 6th Congressional District.

== Minnesota Legislature ==
Anderson was first elected to the House in 1994, and was reelected every two years through 2010. Before the 2002 legislative redistricting, he represented the old District 19B. He was a member of the House Public Safety Policy and Oversight Committee and the Rules and Legislative Administration Committee. He also served on the Finance subcommittees for the Bioscience and Workforce Development Policy and Oversight Division, the Capital Investment Finance Division, and the Energy Finance and Policy Division.

Anderson was first elected to the Minnesota Senate in 2012.

== Personal life and death ==
Anderson was married to Dottie until her death in September 2006. He later married Ruth. He had five children and resided in Buffalo Township, Minnesota.

Anderson died on July 21, 2025, at the age of 75, while still in office.
