= List of special elections to the Minnesota Senate =

This is a list of special elections to the Minnesota Senate. Such elections are called by the governor of Minnesota to fill vacancies that occur when a member of the Minnesota Senate dies or resigns before the next general election. Winners of these elections serve the remainder of the term and are usually candidates in the next election for their districts.

General elections are held in November of the second year following the decennial United States Census and every four years thereafter. New Legislatures convene on the first Tuesday following the first Monday of the following year.

The first special election to the Minnesota Senate occurred in 1861 after the resignation of George Watson.

== List of special elections ==
District	Legislature	Date	Predecessor	Winner	Cause
64	69th	November 5, 1974	Edward G. Novak (DFL)	Peter P. Stumpf Jr. (DFL)	Resigned to accept appointment as Commissioner of Public Safety
47	69th	November 5, 1974	Stan Thorup (DFL)	Eugene Merriam (DFL)	Resigned to become a district court judge
36	69th	December 14, 1974	Jim Lord (DFL)	Robert Schmitz (DFL)	Resigned after election as state treasurer.
33	69th	February 1, 1975	Harold Krieger (I-R)	Nancy Brataas (I-R)	Resigned to become a district court judge
21	70th	November 1, 1977	Alec Olson	Alvin Setzepfandt	Resigned to accept appointment as lieutenant governor
49	70th	December 3, 1977	John Milton (DFL)	Delores Knaak (I-R)	Resigned effective November 1, 1977
13	70th	December 19, 1978	Win Borden (DFL)	David E. Rued (I-R)	Resigned to work for the Minnesota Association of Commerce and Industry
41	71st	June 19, 1979	Robert Lewis (DFL)	Irving Stern (DFL)	Death (heart attack)
55	71st	November 6, 1979	Eugene Stokowski (DFL)	Anne Stokowski (DFL)	Death (heart attack)
66	71st	January 8, 1980	John Chenoweth (DFL)	Emery Barrette (I-R)	Retired to become the director of the Minneapolis Employees Retirement Fund (MERF)
16	71st	February 22, 1980	Ed Schrom (DFL)	Ben Omann (I-R)	Death
20	72nd	May 12, 1981	James Nichols (DFL)	Randy Kamrath (I-R)	Resigned to focus on his family and farm
8	74th	February 5, 1985	James Ulland (I-R)	James Gustafson (I-R)	Resigned on January 9, 1985 to become the Senior Vice President for First Bank System
4	75th	November 3, 1987	Gerald Willet (DFL)	Bob Decker (I-R}	Resigned to accept appointment as commissioner of the Minnesota Pollution Control Agency
37	76th	November 8, 1988	Darril Wegscheid (DFL)	Patricia Pariseau (I-R)	Resigned to devote time to his career at 3M
48	76th	December 20, 1988	Tad Jude (I-R)	Pat McGowan (I-R)	Resigned after election to the Hennepin County Board of Commissioners
24	76th	February 3, 1990	Glen Taylor (I-R)	Mark Piepho (I-R)	Retired with plans to run for governor; did not end up running
61	76th	February 10, 1990	Donna Peterson (DFL)	Carol Flynn (DFL)	Resigned to become a lobbyist for the University of Minnesota
42	77th	January 4, 1992	Don Storm (I-R)	Roy Terwilliger (I-R)	Resigned to accept appointment to the Minnesota Public Utilities Commission.
31	79th	November 8, 1994	Duane Benson (I-R)	Kenric Scheevel (I-R)	Retired to become executive director for the Minnesota Business Partnership
19	79th	November 8, 1994	Betty Adkins (DFL)	Mark Ourada (I-R)	Resigned after injuries sustained in a car crash
47	79th	December 29, 1994	Bill Luther (DFL)	Don Kramer (I-R)	Resigned after election to Minnesota's 6th congressional district
16	79th	December 29, 1994	Joanne Benson (I-R)	Dave Kleis (I-R)	Resigned upon election as Lieutenant Governor of Minnesota
33	79th	February 2, 1995	Pat McGowan (I-R)	Warren Limmer (R)	Resigned after upon election to be Hennepin County Sheriff
14	79th	February 6, 1996	Joe Bertram (DFL)	Michelle Fischbach (R)	Resigned amidst expulsion procedures after pleading guilty to bribery and threats after shoplifting a leather vest
26	81st	March 30, 1999	Tracy Beckman (DFL)	Donald Ziegler (R)	Resigned to accept appointment as Minnesota State Director of the Farm Service Agency
32	81st	April 13, 1999	Steven Morse (DFL)	Bob Kierlin (R)	Resigned to accept appointment as Deputy Commissioner of the Minnesota Department of Natural Resources.
18	81st	November 2, 1999	Janet Johnson (DFL)	Twyla Ring (DFL)	Death (brain tumor)
4	81st	December 14, 1999	David Ten Eyck (DFL)	Tony Kinkel (DFL)	Resigned to accept appointment to the Crow Wing County District Court
7	82nd	January 29, 2002	Sam Solon (DFL)	Yvonne Prettner Solon (DFL)	Death (melanoma)
67	82nd	January 29, 2002	Randy Kelly (DFL)	Mee Moua (DFL)	Resigned upon election to the mayoralty of Saint Paul
37	83rd	July 13, 2004	David Knutson (R)	Chris Gerlach (R)	Resigned to accept appointment to the Minnesota 1st Judicial District Court
19	84th	November 22, 2005	Mark Ourada (R)	Amy Koch (R)	Resigned to take a position with non-profit Center for Energy and Economic Development
43	84th	November 22, 2005	David Gaither (R)	Terri Bonoff (DFL)	Resigned to accept appointment as Chief of Staff to Governor Tim Pawlenty
15	84th	December 27, 2005	Dave Kleis (R)	Tarryl Clark (DFL)	Resigned upon election to the mayoralty of Saint Cloud
25	85th	January 3, 2008	Tom Neuville (R)	Kevin Dahle (DFL)	Resigned to accept appointment to the Minnesota 3rd Judicial District Court
63	86th	November 4, 2008	Dan Larson (DFL)	Ken Kelash (DFL)	Resigned to become a lobbyist
16	86th	November 4, 2008	Betsy Wergin (R)	Lisa Fobbe (DFL)	Resigned to serve on the Minnesota Public Utilities Commission
26	86th	January 26, 2010	Dick Day (R)	Mike Parry (R)	Resign to become a full-time lobbyist for the state's two horse-racing tracks
66	87th	April 10, 2011	Ellen Anderson (DFL)	Mary Jo McGuire (DFL)	Resigned to accept a position as chair of the Minnesota Public Utilities Commission
61	87th	October 10, 2011	Linda Berglin (DFL)	Jeff Hayden (DFL)	Resigned to accept a job as a Hennepin County health policy program manager
46	87th	October 10, 2011	Linda Scheid (DFL)	Chris Eaton (DFL)	Death (ovarian cancer)
59	87th	January 10, 2012	Larry Pogemiller (DFL)	Kari Dziedzic (DFL)	Resigned to accept appointment as Director of Higher Education
20	87th	April 10, 2012	Gary Kubly (DFL)	Lyle Koenen (DFL)	Death (amyotrophic lateral sclerosis)
35	89th	February 9, 2016	Branden Petersen (R)	Jim Abeler (R)	Resigned effective October 31, 2015
54	90th	February 12, 2018	Dan Schoen (DFL)	Karla Bigham (DFL)	Resigned due to allegations of sexual harassment
13	90th	November 6, 2018	Michelle Fischbach (R)	Jeff Howe (R)	Resigned to accept appointment as lieutenant governor
11	91st	February 5, 2019	Tony Lourey (DFL)	Jason Rarick (R)	Resigned to accept appointment as Commissioner of Human Services
45	93rd	November 5, 2024	Kelly Morrison (DFL)	Ann Johnson Stewart (DFL)	Resigned to run for Minnesota's 3rd congressional district
60	94th	January 28, 2025	Kari Dziedzic (DFL)	Doron Clark (DFL)	Death (ovarian cancer)
6	94th	April 29, 2025	Justin Eichorn (R)	Keri Heintzeman (R)	Resigned after facing charges for soliciting a minor for sex
29	94th	November 4, 2025	Bruce Anderson (R)	TBD	Death
47	94th	November 4, 2025	Nicole Mitchell (DFL)	TBD	Resigned after being convicted of burglary
Source: Minnesota Legislature

== Results ==
=== District 67 (2002) ===
Party	Candidate	Votes	%
Democratic (DFL)	Mee Moua	3,055	51.19
Republican	Greg Copeland	1,738	29.12
Independence	Jack Tomczak	1,055	17.68
Green	Jeff Davis	105	1.76
Write-in		15	0.25
Total votes		5,968	100

=== District 25 (2008) ===
Party	Candidate	Votes	%
Democratic (DFL)	Kevin Dahle	6,802	55.15
Republican	Ray Cox	5,225	42.37
Independence	Vance Norgaard	296	2.40
Write-in		10	0.08
Total votes		12,333	100

=== District 66 (2011) ===
Party	Candidate	Votes	%
Democratic (DFL)	Mary Jo McGuire	4,059	80.25
Republican	Greg Copeland	991	19.59
Write-in		8	0.16
Total votes		5,058	100
Democratic (DFL) hold			

=== District 46 (2011) ===
Party	Candidate	Votes	%
Democratic (DFL)	Chris Eaton	3,374	61.85
Republican	Cory Jensen	1,782	32.67
Independence	Matt Brillhart	292	5.35
Write-in		7	0.13
Total votes		5,455	100
Democratic (DFL) hold			

=== District 61 (2011) ===
Party	Candidate	Votes	%
Democratic (DFL)	Jeff Hayden	1,856	68.24
Green	Farheen Hakeem	595	21.88
Republican	Bruce Lundeen	221	8.13
Independence	Matt Brillhart	44	1.62
Write-in		4	0.15
Total votes		2,720	100
Democratic (DFL) hold			

=== District 59 (2012) ===
DFL primary election
Party	Candidate	Votes	%
Democratic (DFL)	Kari Dziedzic	1,965	32.11
Democratic (DFL)	Mohamud Noor	1,626	26.57
Democratic (DFL)	Peter Wagenius	1,089	17.80
Democratic (DFL)	Paul Ostrow	792	12.94
Democratic (DFL)	Jacob Frey	473	7.73
Democratic (DFL)	Alicia Frosch	36	0.59
Total votes		5,981	100

General election
Party	Candidate	Votes	%
Democratic (DFL)	Kari Dziedzic	3,393	79.41
Republican	Ben Schwanke	824	19.28
Write-in		56	1.31
Total votes		3,381	100
Democratic (DFL) hold			

=== District 20 (2012) ===
Party	Candidate	Votes	%
Democratic (DFL)	Lyle Koenen	3,914	54.41
Republican	Kathleen Fowke	2,912	40.48
Independence	Leon Greenslit	364	5.06
Write-in		3	0.04
Total votes		3,381	100
Democratic (DFL) hold			

=== District 35 (2016) ===
Party	Candidate	Votes	%
Republican	Jim Abeler	3,914	73.69
Democratic (DFL)	Roger Johnson	947	21.56
Legal Marijuana Now	Zach Phelps	180	4.10
Write-in		29	0.66
Total votes		4,393	100
Republican hold			

=== District 54 (2018) ===
Party	Candidate	Votes	%
Democratic (DFL)	Karla Bigham	7,343	50.73
Republican	Denny McNamara	6,813	47.06
Libertarian	Emily Mellingen	313	2.16
Write-in		7	0.05
Total votes		14,476	100
Democratic (DFL) hold			

=== District 13 (2018) ===
Party	Candidate	Votes	%
Republican	Jeff Howe	21,714	57.38
Democratic (DFL)	Joe Perske	16,108	42.57
Write-in		20	0.05
Total votes		37,842	100
Republican hold			

=== District 11 (2019) ===
Party	Candidate	Votes	%
Republican	Jason Rarick	8,127	52.02
Democratic (DFL)	Stu Lourey	7,171	45.90
Legal Marijuana Now	John Birrenbach	298	1.91
Write-in		27	0.17
Total votes		15,623	100
Republican gain from Democratic (DFL)			

=== District 45 (2024) ===
Party	Candidate	Votes	%
Democratic (DFL)	Ann Johnson Stewart	29,791	52.43
Republican	Kathleen Fowke	26,969	47.47
Write-in		58	0.10
Total votes		56,818	100
Democratic (DFL) hold			

=== District 60 (2025) ===
Senate District 60 Special Election
Party	Candidate	Votes	%
Democratic (DFL)	Doron Clark	7,783	90.91
Republican	Abigail Wolters	746	8.71
Write-in		32	0.37
Total votes		8,561	100

== See also ==
- List of special elections to the Minnesota House of Representatives
