= 2011 Minnesota elections =

Elections in the U.S. state of Minnesota

- November 8, 2011

The 2011 Minnesota elections took place on November 8, 2011 in the U.S. State of Minnesota to elect various nonpartisan municipal offices. There were also township elections and several legislative special elections for the Minnesota House and Senate.

== State legislative special elections ==
Four special elections to the 87th Minnesota Legislature were held for 2025.

=== House district 5B special election ===
A special election was held on February 15, 2011 to fill House district 5B, which had been vacated by the resignation of DFLer Tony Sertich, who had been appointed to the Iron Range Resources and Rehabilitation Board. DFL nominee Carly Melin defeated Republican Paul Jacobson and Independence nominee Cynthia Kafut-Hagen by a wide margin.

House district 5B Special Democratic-Farmer-Labor Primary
Party	Candidate	Votes	%
Democratic (DFL)	Carly Melin	2,005	50.14
Democratic (DFL)	Shelley Robinson	1,180	29.51
Democratic (DFL)	Raymond Lee Pierce	402	10.05
Democratic (DFL)	Jeff Kletscher	317	7.93
Democratic (DFL)	John J. Spanish	95	2.38
Total votes		3,999	100.0

House district 5B Special Election
Party	Candidate	Votes	%
Democratic (DFL)	Carly Melin	4,526	60.39
Republican	Paul Jacobson	2,658	35.46
Independence	Cynthia Kafut-Hagen	298	3.98
Write-in		13	0.17
Total votes		7,595	100.0

=== Senate district 66 special election ===
A special election was held on April 10, 2011 to fill the 66th State Senate district, which had been vacated by the resignation of DFLer Ellen Anderson who was appointed to the Minnesota Public Utilities Commission. DFL nominee Mary Jo McGuire defeated Republican Greg Copeland by a wide margin.

Senate District 66 Special Democratic-Farmer-Labor primary
Party	Candidate	Votes	%
Democratic (DFL)	Mary Jo McGuire	2,006	54.07
Democratic (DFL)	John Lesch	1,350	36.39
Democratic (DFL)	Steven Marchese	354	9.54
Total votes		3,710	100.0

Senate district 66 Special Election
Party	Candidate	Votes	%
Democratic (DFL)	Mary Jo McGuire	4,059	80.25
Republican	Greg Copeland	991	19.59
Write-in		8	0.16
Total votes		5,058	100.0

=== Senate district 46 special election ===
A special election was held on January 28, 2025 to fill the 46th State Senate district, which had been vacated by the death of DFLer Linda Scheid due to cancer. DFL nominee Chris Eaton defeated Republican Cory Jensen and Independence nominee Tom Reynolds by a wide margin.

Senate District 46 Special Democratic-Farmer-Labor primary
Party	Candidate	Votes	%
Democratic (DFL)	Chris Eaton	1,374	88.82
Democratic (DFL)	Timothy A. Davis Sr.	173	11.18
Total votes		1,547	100.0

Senate District 46 Special Republican primary
Party	Candidate	Votes	%
Republican	Cory Jensen	736	85.19
Republican	Ryan Sibinski	128	14.81
Total votes		864	100.0

Senate district 46 Special Election
Party	Candidate	Votes	%
Democratic (DFL)	Chris Eaton	3,374	61.85
Republican	Cory Jensen	1,782	32.67
Independence	Tom Reynolds	292	5.35
Write-in		7	0.13
Total votes		5,455	100.0

=== Senate district 61 special election ===
A special election was held on January 28, 2025 to fill the 61st State Senate district, which had been vacated by the resignation of DFLer Linda Berglin, who was hired as a Hennepin County health policy program manager. DFL nominee Jeff Hayden defeated Green Party nominee Farheen Hakeem, Republican Bruce A. Lundeen, and Independence nominee Matt Brillhart by a wide margin.

Senate District 61 Special Democratic-Farmer-Labor primary
Party	Candidate	Votes	%
Democratic (DFL)	Jeff Hayden	1,361	57.69
Democratic (DFL)	Sadik Warfa	666	28.23
Democratic (DFL)	Paulette Will	173	7.33
Democratic (DFL)	Elsa Batica	62	2.63
Democratic (DFL)	Kristian Heuer	50	2.12
Democratic (DFL)	Kyle Wilson	47	1.99
Total votes		2,359	100.0

Senate district 61 Special Election
Party	Candidate	Votes	%
Democratic (DFL)	Jeff Hayden	1,856	68.24
Green	Farheen Hakeem	595	21.88
Republican	Cory Bruce A. Lundeen	221	8.13
Independence	Matt Brillhart	44	1.62
Write-in		4	0.15
Total votes		2,720	100.0

== Local elections ==
=== Hennepin County ===
==== Brooklyn Park mayor ====
Brooklyn Park held a special election on April 30, 2011 to replace Steve Lampi, who had died from cancer shortly after beginning his third term. Twelve candidates filed to succeed Lampi, with former city councillor and 2010 mayoral candidate Jeff Lunde winning roughly 31% of the vote. Lunde defeated activist Billy Bushop, Lauri Hilgers, former mayor Jim Krautkremer, former city councillors Mark Mata and Jeanette Meyer, activist and consultant Boyd Morson, former city councillor Tony Pistilli, infectious disease researcher Wynfred Russell, independent contractor Scott Scheid, local comedian Joe Tanner, and activist Tait Turnquist.

Instead of being scheduled on a tuesday, when elections are normally held, the special election was held on a Saturday in an effort to increase voter turnout.

=== Ramsey County ===
==== St. Paul City Council ====
St. Paul held regularly scheduled elections for the city council.

=== St. Louis County ===
==== Duluth Mayor ====
A regularly scheduled mayoral election was held in Duluth, Minnesota, concurrent with the fall general election. Incumbent mayor Don Ness, first elected in 2007, was re-elected without opposition.

==== Duluth city council ====
Regularly scheduled elections were held in 5 districts of the Duluth City Council, concurrent with the fall general election.

A special election was held in the 4th district, concurrent with the fall general election, Garry Krause was elected with a 3 point margin.

==== Duluth ballot question ====
A regularly scheduled ballot question was voted on, concurrent with the fall general election. The ballot proposed creating a "Parks Fund" to provide funding to Duluth's parks and recreation facilities. The measure passed with 57% of the vote.

== See also ==
- List of special elections to the Minnesota Senate
- List of special elections to the Minnesota House of Representatives
