= Minnesota's 64th Senate district =

American legislative district

Minnesota's 64th State Senate district
Senator
Erin Murphy; DFL–Saint Paul
since January 5, 2021
- Demographics: 81.1% White; 7% Black; 3.8% Hispanic; 4.1% Asian; 0.3% Native American; 1.2% Other; 2.7% Multiracial
- Population (2020): 68,861

The 64th district of the Minnesota Senate encompasses the south-western corner of Minnesota's State Capital, and the county seat of Ramsey, Saint Paul. It has formerly included Mahnomen, Norman, Beltrami, Koochiching, and Lake of the Woods counties. The district is currently served by Democratic-Farmer-Labor Senator and current Senate Majority leader Erin Murphy.

== List of senators ==
Session	Image	Senator	Party	Term start	Term end	Home	Counties represented
39th		Albert L. Hanson	Nonpartisan Election	January 4, 1915	January 5, 1919	Ada	Mahnomen, and Norman
40th		Albert L. Hanson	Nonpartisan Election	January 4, 1915	January 5, 1919	Ada	Mahnomen, and Norman
41st		John L. Wold	Nonpartisan Election	January 6, 1919	December 31, 1922	Twin Valley	Mahnomen, and Norman
42nd		John L. Wold	Nonpartisan Election	January 6, 1919	December 31, 1922	Twin Valley	Mahnomen, and Norman
43rd		J. W. Nelson	Nonpartisan Election	January 1, 1923	January 2, 1927	Manhomen	Mahnomen, and Norman
44th		J. W. Nelson	Nonpartisan Election	January 1, 1923	January 2, 1927	Manhomen	Mahnomen, and Norman
45th		Peter Sharpe	Nonpartisan Election	January 3, 1927	January 4, 1931	Ada	Mahnomen, and Norman
46th		Peter Sharpe	Nonpartisan Election	January 3, 1927	January 4, 1931	Ada	Mahnomen, and Norman
47th		Herman F. Sprung	Nonpartisan Election-Liberal Caucus	January 5, 1931	January 1, 1939	Ada	Mahnomen, and Norman
48th		Herman F. Sprung	Nonpartisan Election-Liberal Caucus	January 5, 1931	January 1, 1939	Ada	Mahnomen, and Norman
49th		Herman F. Sprung	Nonpartisan Election-Liberal Caucus	January 5, 1931	January 1, 1939	Ada	Mahnomen, and Norman
50th		Herman F. Sprung	Nonpartisan Election-Liberal Caucus	January 5, 1931	January 1, 1939	Ada	Mahnomen, and Norman
51st		Norman J. Larson	Nonpartisan Election	January 2, 1939	January 6, 1963	Ada	Mahnomen, and Norman
52nd		Norman J. Larson	Nonpartisan Election	January 2, 1939	January 6, 1963	Ada	Mahnomen, and Norman
53rd		Norman J. Larson	Nonpartisan Election	January 2, 1939	January 6, 1963	Ada	Mahnomen, and Norman
54th		Norman J. Larson	Nonpartisan Election	January 2, 1939	January 6, 1963	Ada	Mahnomen, and Norman
55th		Norman J. Larson	Nonpartisan Election	January 2, 1939	January 6, 1963	Ada	Mahnomen, and Norman
56th		Norman J. Larson	Nonpartisan Election	January 2, 1939	January 6, 1963	Ada	Mahnomen, and Norman
57th		Norman J. Larson	Nonpartisan Election - Conservative Caucus	January 2, 1939	January 6, 1963	Ada	Mahnomen, and Norman
58th		Norman J. Larson	Nonpartisan Election - Conservative Caucus	January 2, 1939	January 6, 1963	Ada	Mahnomen, and Norman
59th		Norman J. Larson	Nonpartisan Election - Conservative Caucus	January 2, 1939	January 6, 1963	Ada	Mahnomen, and Norman
60th		Norman J. Larson	Nonpartisan Election - Conservative Caucus	January 2, 1939	January 6, 1963	Ada	Mahnomen, and Norman
61st		Norman J. Larson	Nonpartisan Election - Conservative Caucus	January 2, 1939	January 6, 1963	Ada	Mahnomen, and Norman
62nd		Norman J. Larson	Nonpartisan Election - Conservative Caucus	January 2, 1939	January 6, 1963	Ada	Mahnomen, and Norman
63rd		John Henry McKee Sr.	Nonpartisan Election - Conservative Caucus	January 7, 1963	January 1, 1967	Bemidji	Beltrami, Koochiching and Lake of the Woods
64th		John Henry McKee Sr.	Nonpartisan Election - Conservative Caucus	January 7, 1963	January 1, 1967	Bemidji	Beltrami, Koochiching and Lake of the Woods
65th		Gene S. Mammenga	Nonpartisan Election-Liberal Caucus	January 2, 1967	December 31, 1972	Bemidji	Beltrami, Koochiching and Lake of the Woods
66th		Gene S. Mammenga	Nonpartisan Election-Liberal Caucus	January 2, 1967	December 31, 1972	Bemidji	Beltrami, Koochiching and Lake of the Woods
67th		Gene S. Mammenga	Nonpartisan Election-Liberal Caucus	January 2, 1967	December 31, 1972	Bemidji	Beltrami, Koochiching and Lake of the Woods
68th		Edward G. Novak	Nonpartisan Election - Democratic-Farmer-Labor Caucus	January 1, 1973	June 10, 1974	Saint Paul	Ramsey
69th		Peter P. Stumpf Jr.	Democratic-Farmer-Labor	January 7, 1975	January 2, 1983	Saint Paul	Ramsey
70th		Peter P. Stumpf Jr.	Democratic-Farmer-Labor	January 7, 1975	January 2, 1983	Saint Paul	Ramsey
71st		Peter P. Stumpf Jr.	Democratic-Farmer-Labor	January 7, 1975	January 2, 1983	Saint Paul	Ramsey
72nd		Peter P. Stumpf Jr.	Democratic-Farmer-Labor	January 7, 1975	January 2, 1983	Saint Paul	Ramsey
73rd		Ronald B. Sieloff	Independent Republican	January 3, 1983	January 4, 1987	Saint Paul	Ramsey
74th		Ronald B. Sieloff	Independent Republican	January 3, 1983	January 4, 1987	Saint Paul	Ramsey
75th		Dick Cohen	Democratic-Farmer-Labor	January 5, 1987	January 1, 2021	Saint Paul	Ramsey
76th		Dick Cohen	Democratic-Farmer-Labor	January 5, 1987	January 1, 2021	Saint Paul	Ramsey
77th		Dick Cohen	Democratic-Farmer-Labor	January 5, 1987	January 1, 2021	Saint Paul	Ramsey
78th		Dick Cohen	Democratic-Farmer-Labor	January 5, 1987	January 1, 2021	Saint Paul	Ramsey
79th		Dick Cohen	Democratic-Farmer-Labor	January 5, 1987	January 1, 2021	Saint Paul	Ramsey
80th		Dick Cohen	Democratic-Farmer-Labor	January 5, 1987	January 1, 2021	Saint Paul	Ramsey
81st		Dick Cohen	Democratic-Farmer-Labor	January 5, 1987	January 1, 2021	Saint Paul	Ramsey
82nd		Dick Cohen	Democratic-Farmer-Labor	January 5, 1987	January 1, 2021	Saint Paul	Ramsey
83rd		Dick Cohen	Democratic-Farmer-Labor	January 5, 1987	January 1, 2021	Saint Paul	Ramsey
84th		Dick Cohen	Democratic-Farmer-Labor	January 5, 1987	January 1, 2021	Saint Paul	Ramsey
85th		Dick Cohen	Democratic-Farmer-Labor	January 5, 1987	January 1, 2021	Saint Paul	Ramsey
86th		Dick Cohen	Democratic-Farmer-Labor	January 5, 1987	January 1, 2021	Saint Paul	Ramsey
87th		Dick Cohen	Democratic-Farmer-Labor	January 5, 1987	January 1, 2021	Saint Paul	Ramsey
88th		Dick Cohen	Democratic-Farmer-Labor	January 5, 1987	January 1, 2021	Saint Paul	Ramsey
90th		Dick Cohen	Democratic-Farmer-Labor	January 5, 1987	January 1, 2021	Saint Paul	Ramsey
91st		Dick Cohen	Democratic-Farmer-Labor	January 5, 1987	January 1, 2021	Saint Paul	Ramsey
92nd		Erin Murphy	Democratic-Farmer-Labor	January 5, 2021	Incumbent	Saint Paul	Ramsey
93rd		Erin Murphy	Democratic-Farmer-Labor	January 5, 2021	Incumbent	Saint Paul	Ramsey
94th		Erin Murphy	Democratic-Farmer-Labor	January 5, 2021	Incumbent	Saint Paul	Ramsey

== Recent elections ==
=== 2022 ===
The candidate filing deadline was May 31, 2022. The general election was held on November 8, 2022, resulting in Murphy's victory.

2022 Minnesota Senate election
Party	Candidate	Votes	%
Democratic (DFL)	Erin Murphy	36,686	84.2
Republican	Robert Bushard	6,823	15.7
Write-in	N/A	65	0.1
Total votes		43,574	100.0
Democratic (DFL) hold			

=== 2020 ===
The candidate filing deadline was June 6, 2020. The general election was held on November 3, 2020, resulting in Murphy's victory.

2020 Minnesota Senate election
Party	Candidate	Votes	%
Democratic (DFL)	Erin Murphy	40,206	78.7
Republican	Sharon Anderson	7,488	14.6
Legal Marijuana Now	Patricia Jirovec McArdell	3,281	6.4
Write-in	N/A	139	0.3
Total votes		51,114	100.0
Democratic (DFL) hold			

=== 2016 ===
The candidate filing deadline was May 31, 2016. The general election was held on November 8, 2016, resulting in Cohen's victory.

Minnesota State Senate election, 2008
Party	Candidate	Votes	%
Democratic (DFL)	Dick Cohen	36,757	76.8
Republican	Ian Baird	11,078	23.2
Total votes		47,835	100.0
Democratic (DFL) hold			

=== 2012 ===
Elections for the Minnesota State Senate occurred after state-wide redistricting from 2010. The signature-filing deadline for candidates wishing to run in this election was June 5, 2012. Dick Cohen defeated Sharon Anderson and Scott Larson in the general election.

Minnesota State Senate election, 2012
Party	Candidate	Votes	%
Democratic (DFL)	Dick Cohen	33,008	69.8
Republican	Sharon Anderson	9,068	19.2
Independent	Scott Larson	5,196	11
Total votes		47,272	100.0
Democratic (DFL) hold			
