= John Lesch =

American politician (born 1973)

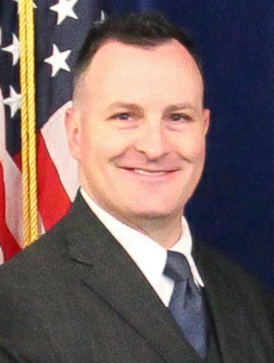

Member of the Minnesota House of Representatives from the 66B district 66A (2003–2013)
- In office January 7, 2003 – January 5, 2021
- Preceded by: redrawn district
- Succeeded by: Athena Hollins

Personal details
- Born: January 15, 1973 (age 53) Minneapolis, Minnesota
- Party: Minnesota Democratic–Farmer–Labor Party
- Spouse: Melissa Reed
- Children: 2
- Education: Saint Louis University; Hamline University
- Occupation: Attorney

John Lesch (born January 15, 1973) is a Minnesota politician and former member of the Minnesota House of Representatives. A member of the Minnesota Democratic–Farmer–Labor Party (DFL), he last represented 66B, which included portions of Saint Paul in Ramsey County, in the Twin Cities metropolitan area. He is a prosecuting attorney for Saint Paul.

== Early life, education, and career ==
Lesch attended St. Louis University, graduating with degrees in philosophy and psychology, and later a Juris Doctor degree from Hamline University School of Law. Through high school and college, he spent three years at the seminary with the Redemptorists Order of Catholic Priests and Brothers.

Before running for the Minnesota House of Representatives, Lesch interned for former Democratic-Farmer-Labor Party (DFL) Representative Andy Dawkins in 1997 and 1998. He worked on several campaigns and chaired the Senate District 66 DFL Party from 2000 to 2002. He was also a legislative aide to former St. Paul Council member and then Mayor Chris Coleman. When Representative Tom Osthoff announced his retirement in 2002, he decided to run for the House.

== Political career ==
=== Minnesota House of Representatives ===
Lesch was first elected in 2002 and has been reelected every two years since.

On November 16, 2010, incoming Minority Leader Paul Thissen announced that Lesch would be one of four minority whips during the 2011–12 legislative session.

Lesch has served on several committees including:

- Crime Victims Sub Committee 2007-2009
- Saint Paul Delegation 2007
- Crime Victims and Criminal Records Division 2009-11
- Chair of Civil Law 2013-15

==== Animal legislation ====
===== Dangerous dogs =====
In June 2007, Lesch proposed legislation to ban five breeds of dogs identified as especially aggressive by the Centers for Disease Control: Rottweilers, pit bulls, Akitas, Chow Chows, and wolf hybrids. Mixes of these breeds were also banned under the bill. A study published in the Journal of the American Veterinary Medical Association in 2000 found that half of the 238 human deaths it identified as dog-related over the preceding 20-year period involved either pit bull-type dogs or Rottweilers. Opponents to Lesch's proposal argued that bite statistics are a consequence more of the popularity of certain breeds than of any predisposition to aggression. Opponents also identified owner behavior as the determining factor in canine aggression and pointed to the difficulty of identifying a dog of mixed breed without genetic testing.

Lesch's proposed legislation did not make it out of committee.

===== Dog/cat breeder bill =====
This was passed in 2014 and creates a system of licensing and inspection for commercial breeders through the Board of Animal Health. The bill is intended to reduce the number of kitten and puppy mills in the state and mandate the proper treatment of animals.

===== Beagle Freedom Bill =====
On May 21, 2014, Minnesota became the first state to pass the "Beagle Freedom Bill". It was included in the omnibus supplemental budget bill. The authors, Lesch and Senator Scott Dibble, link taxpayer-funded laboratories and educational institutions that use dogs and cats for research with nonprofit animal rescues. The animals can be placed for adoption when they are no longer needed for research.

===== Revenge porn =====
In 2015, Lesch began pursuing a overhaul of Minnesota's criminal defamation laws in the wake of the Minnesota Court of Appeals' striking down of that statute, thereby depleting protections from online harassment, including so-called "revenge porn", which Lesch claims he had been motivated to address in policy since reading about the 2013 death of Rhetea Parsons. The bill Lesch's working group produced included nine sections of law and, in addition to correcting the criminal defamation statute that the Minnesota Court of Appeals had struck down, included the civil causes of action for "Nonconsensual Dissemination of Private Sexual Images" and criminal penalties for the same conduct. The law was immediately challenged and brought to the court of appeals, which struck it down on free speech grounds, but Lesch prevailed upon Minnesota Attorney General Keith Ellison to appeal the ruling to the Minnesota Supreme Court, which unanimously ruled the law constitutional. "The fact that we will see justice in some of [the cases] in the future because of this ruling is such great news", Lesch said. "To have [the law] come through and be vindicated by the Supreme Court today is one of my greatest legislative accomplishments in the past 18 years, if not the greatest."

== Trip to Iraq and other international travel ==
In February 2006, Lesch made a personal trip to Iraq at his own expense with the stated intention to learn as much as possible about the war there in as little time as possible. His plans to blog the trip soon leaked to the press and the trip became a several-day news story. "While it is true that most folks would choose more stable settings for their vacation, I believe the Iraq war is the seminal conflict for our age", Lesch wrote in announcing his departure. "What happens there today will affect many generations of Americans and Iraqis". Lesch received some praise, in the local press for making the trip, but mostly sharp criticism. He said he had wanted to see firsthand what conditions were like there, and that the trip was the most rewarding he had ever taken. Despite the substantial criticism the trip received, Lesch said he had no regrets about it.

In August 2007, Lesch participated in a Legislative Exchange sponsored by the State Department to study diplomacy among emerging leaders in the Philippines. During this trip, he spent time in Manila and Cebu.

In September 2009, Lesch and other state legislators from around the country went to New Zealand. The trip was sponsored by the American Council of Young Political Leaders (ACYPL) and focused on energy development and health care.

== Controversies ==
=== Campaign funds violation ===
On August 1, 2017, the Minnesota Campaign Finance Board ruled that Lesch and his campaign committee made a series of improper money transfers between 2010 and 2013 and failed to keep adequate records. The Board fined Lesch's campaign committee $5,000 and Lesch personally $15,000.

The amount of the fine is one of the larger civil penalties levied against a lawmaker for campaign violations in the state, according to the board's executive director, Jeff Sigurdson. The board often levies penalties against lawmakers for incorrect bookkeeping or other matters, but rarely finds cases of officials using campaign money for their own benefit. The board concluded that Lesch transferred $11,000 in campaign contributions from his campaign account to his personal account at times when there otherwise would have been "insufficient funds". Lesch has repaid just over $2,000.

Lesch denied he did anything improper. "The board's conclusion that funds were converted to personal use is unfounded", he said. "It remains based solely on the absence of receipts. I deny using any campaign funds for personal purposes."

=== Defamatory letter lawsuit ===
On January 3, 2018, Lesch sent recently inaugurated St. Paul Mayor Melvin Carter a defamatory letter about incoming St. Paul City Attorney Lyndsey Olson. Olson sued Lesch for defamation.

Saying he wrote the letter as part of his duties as a representative, Lesch claimed legislative immunity under the Speech or Debate Clause of the Minnesota Constitution and filed a motion to dismiss the suit. The Minnesota Supreme Court affirmed the lower courts' holding that Lesch was not acting in his official capacity at the time, and that legislative immunity did not attach, denying his motion to dismiss the suit.

Lesch later settled with Olson. The settlement included a public apology to Olson and Carter for his defamatory statements as well as other undisclosed financial terms. The apology was published in the Pioneer Press in June 2022.

== Runs for other offices ==
=== United States Senate ===
In February 2007, Lesch said he was considering running for the United States Senate seat held by Norm Coleman. No campaign announcement was ever made.

=== Minnesota Senate ===
In March 2011, newly elected Minnesota Governor Mark Dayton appointed District 66 State Senator Ellen Anderson chair of the Minnesota Public Utilities Commission. After she announced her resignation from the Senate, effective March 21, 2011, a number of people announced their campaigns for the seat, including Lesch, former DFL State Representative Mary Jo McGuire, DFL Attorney Steve Marchese, and Republican Greg Copeland. The primary election was on March 29, 2011, and the general election on April 12.

Since the district leans heavily towards the DFL, the key election was the DFL primary. During the primary campaign, Representative Alice Hausman endorsed McGuire. Lesch lost the primary to McGuire, 54% to 36%. McGuire won the general election.

=== Minnesota Attorney General ===
On April 4, 2017, Lesch announced that he would run for Minnesota Attorney General if the current Attorney General, Lori Swanson, decided to run for governor. On September 15, 2017, six weeks after agreeing to pay $20,000 in fines to the Minnesota Campaign Finance Board for misusing campaign funds, he announced that he was withdrawing from the race. He said the Campaign Finance Board allegations had nothing to do with his withdrawal, but that the time was not right for him personally or politically to run for higher office, especially since it was unknown whether Swanson would run for reelection.

== Electoral history ==
Minnesota Legislature - Senate District 66 - 2011 Special Election - DFL Primary
Party	Candidate	Votes	%
Democratic (DFL)	Mary Jo McGuire	2,006	54.07
Democratic (DFL)	John Lesch	1,350	36.39
Democratic (DFL)	Steven Marchese	354	9.54

2010 Minnesota Legislature - House District 66A
Party	Candidate	Votes	%
Democratic (DFL)	John Lesch	4,894	71.2
Republican	Chris Conner	1,952	28.4

2008 Minnesota Legislature - House District 66A
Party	Candidate	Votes	%
Democratic (DFL)	John Lesch	9,001	76.8
Republican	Gilbert A. Higuera	2,665	22.7

2006 Minnesota Legislature - House District 66A
Party	Candidate	Votes	%
Democratic (DFL)	John Lesch	6,007	77.5
Republican	David R. Buehler	1,712	22.1

2004 Minnesota Legislature - House District 66A
Party	Candidate	Votes	%
Democratic (DFL)	John Lesch	8,850	74.6
Republican	Greg Copeland	1,712	22.1

2002 Minnesota Legislature - House District 66A
Party	Candidate	Votes	%
Democratic (DFL)	John Lesch	6,489	71.5
Republican	Greg Copeland	2,550	28.1

== Personal life ==
In late December 2011, Lesch proposed to Melissa Reed, a lobbyist for the City of Minneapolis at the Minneapolis Holidazzle Parade, in the presence of Minneapolis Mayor R.T. Rybak, Saint Paul Mayor Chris Coleman and a crowd of others. They married in September 2012. Lesch was married previously and has a child by that marriage.

=== Enlistment in National Guard ===
On October 8, 2009, it was reported that Lesch had joined the Minnesota National Guard as an infantry officer. As a practicing attorney, Lesch would normally join the military as a member of JAG or Judge Advocate General's Corps. He completed his Basic Training and Advanced Infantry Training at Fort Benning, Georgia, on February 12, 2010, graduating with a 90% rank in physical performance and rifle marksmanship. Lesch was commissioned at Ft. Benning on September 2, 2010, graduating 7th in a class of over 100. He maintains a rank of 2nd Lieutenant (O-1) and leads a platoon of light infantry soldiers with the 34th Infantry Division (Red Bulls).

While attending Officer Candidate School, Lesch commenced his reelection campaign for the Minnesota House of Representatives via Facebook and Twitter. Minnesota's Campaign Finance and Public Disclosure Board determined there are no restrictions on running for office while in the military, and no complaint was brought against Lesch. The military's own rules about political activity are complicated, however. Although neither the Army nor Minnesota National Guard has issued a formal statement regarding Lesch's campaign activities and no complaints have been made, unintentional violations of those rules can easily occur.
