= 2016 Minnesota Senate district 35 special election =

District 35 special election, 2016
- February 9, 2016

The District 35 seat in the Minnesota Senate
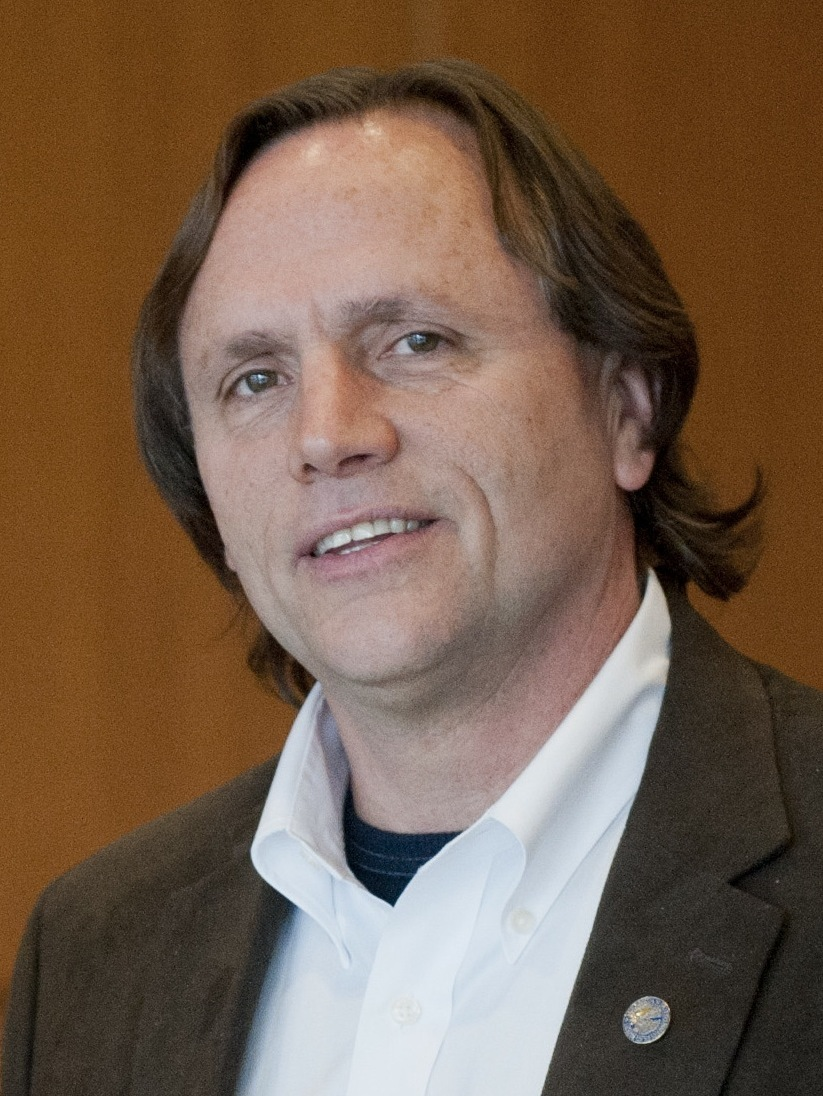
		DFL
Nominee	Jim Abeler	Roger Johnson
Party	Republican	Democratic (DFL)
Popular vote	3,237	947
Percentage	73.69%	21.56%
- Precinct Results; Abeler: 60-70% 70-80% 80-90%
Senator before election
Branden Petersen
Republican
Elected Senator
Jim Abeler
Republican

A special election was held in the U.S. state of Minnesota on February 9, 2016, to elect a new senator for District 35 in the Minnesota Senate, caused by the resignation of Senator Branden Petersen, effective on October 31, 2015. A primary election was held on January 12, 2016, to nominate a Republican Party of Minnesota candidate. Former state representative Jim Abeler, the Republican nominee, won the special election.

== Candidates ==
=== Republican Party of Minnesota ===
The Senate District 35 Republican Party held a convention to endorse a candidate on November 14. Andy Aplikowski won the endorsement after four rounds of balloting. Former state representative Jim Abeler said he would continue to seek the Republican nomination. Don Huizenga was undecided on whether he would continue to seek the nomination, but ultimately did not file a candidacy. Brad Sunderland said he would abide by the endorsement.

- Jim Abeler, former state representative and candidate for the 2014 U.S. Senate Republican nomination
- Andy Aplikowski, party activist

==== Withdrawn ====
- Alex Huffman, business owner and former U.S. Army serviceman
- Don Huizenga, party activist
- Reid Oines
- Brad Sunderland, chair of the Senate District 35 Republican Party

=== Minnesota Democratic–Farmer–Labor Party ===
The Senate District 35 Democratic–Farmer–Labor Party endorsed Roger Johnson on December 16, 2015.

- Roger Johnson, community activist

=== Legal Marijuana Now Party ===
- Zach Phelps

== Primary election results ==
District 35 special primary election, 2016
Party	Candidate	Votes	%
Republican Party of Minnesota	Jim Abeler	2,818	60.93
Republican Party of Minnesota	Andy Aplikowski	1,807	39.07
Republican Party of Minnesota	Subtotal	4,625	100.00
Minnesota Democratic–Farmer–Labor Party	Roger Johnson	282	100.00
Total		4,907	100.00

== Results ==
Minnesota Senate District 35 special election, 2016
Party	Candidate	Votes	%	∆pp
Republican Party of Minnesota	Jim Abeler	3,237	73.69	+19.48
Minnesota Democratic–Farmer–Labor Party	Roger Johnson	947	21.56	−24.07
Legal Marijuana Now Party	Zach Phelps	180	4.10	+4.10
Write-in	N/A	29	0.66	+0.50
Total		4,393	100.00	±0.00

== Previous election results ==
Minnesota Senate election, 2012: District 35
Party	Candidate	Votes	%	∆pp
Republican Party of Minnesota	Branden Petersen	22,874	54.21	−6.38
Minnesota Democratic–Farmer–Labor Party	Peter Perovich	19,253	45.63	+6.33
Write-in	N/A	69	0.16	+0.05
Total		42,196	100.00	±0.00

== See also ==
- List of special elections to the Minnesota Senate
