= Jeff Howell =

Jeff Howell may refer to:

- Jeff Howell (baseball) (born 1983), American baseball player on the 2014 Washington Nationals season spring training roster
- Jeff Howell (journalist) (fl. c. 1990), voice actor and host of The Monsters in the Morning radio show
- Jeff Howell (musician) (fl. c. 1990), former member of The Outlaws
- Jeff Howell (actor) (fl. 1990s), American actor in the film Two Evil Eyes

== See also ==
- Jeff Howe, Minnesota politician
