= Senator Stumpf =

Senator Stumpf may refer to:

- LeRoy Stumpf (born 1944), Minnesota State Senate
- Peter P. Stumpf Jr. (1948–2010), Minnesota State Senate

== See also ==
- Herman Stump (1837–1917), Maryland State Senate
