= Athena Hollins =

American state politician (born 1983)

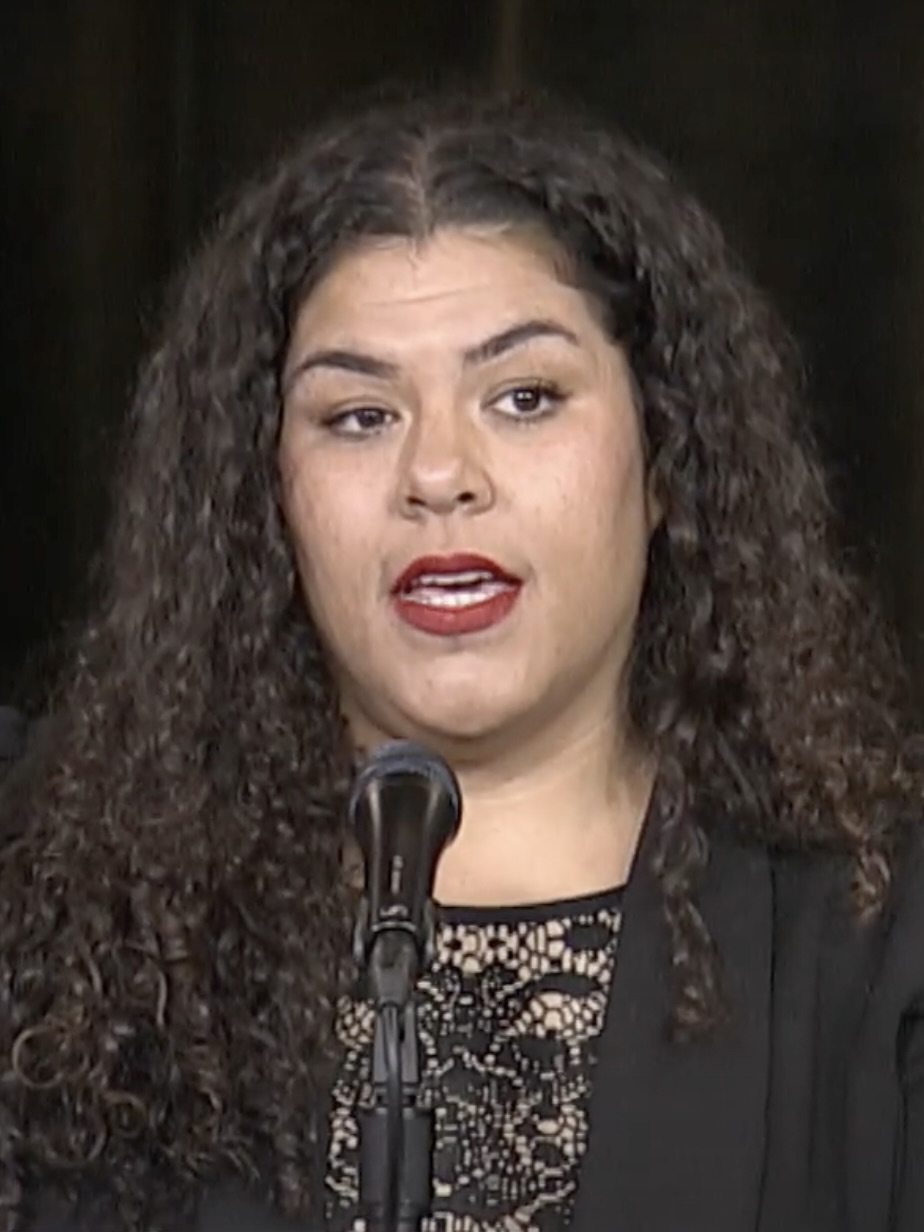
- Hollins in 2024

Majority Whip of the Minnesota House of Representatives
- In office January 3, 2023 – January 14, 2025
- Preceded by: Kaohly Her

Member of the Minnesota House of Representatives from the 66B district
- Incumbent
- Assumed office January 5, 2021
- Preceded by: John Lesch

Personal details
- Born: October 18, 1983 (age 42) Hawaii, U.S.
- Party: Democratic (DFL)
- Spouse: married
- Children: 2
- Education: Reed College (B.A.); University of Saint Thomas (J.D.)
- Occupation: Attorney; Legislator
- Website: Government website Campaign website

Athena Hollins (born October 18, 1983) is an American politician serving in the Minnesota House of Representatives since 2021. A member of the Minnesota Democratic–Farmer–Labor Party (DFL), Hollins represents District 66B, which includes parts of Saint Paul in Ramsey County, Minnesota.

From 2023 to 2025, Hollins served as majority whip for the House DFL caucus.

== Early life, education, and career ==
Born in Hawaii, Hollins attended Reed College, graduating with a B.A. in psychology, and the University of Saint Thomas, graduating with a J.D. in 2011.

After graduating from law school, Hollins practiced family law and estate planning. She served as president of the Payne-Phalen Community Council. She works in community relations and diversity and inclusion, serving as a senior director of diversity and foundations.

== Minnesota House of Representatives ==
Hollins was elected to the Minnesota House of Representatives in 2020 and was reelected in 2022. She challenged nine-term DFL incumbent John Lesch for the DFL endorsement and lost, but defeated him in the primary election.

Hollins serves as the majority whip for the House DFL caucus and vice chair of the Rules and Legislative Administration Committee. She sits on the Climate and Energy Finance and Policy and Public Safety Finance and Policy Committees, as well as the Property Tax Division of the Taxes Committee. Hollins is a member of the House People of Color & Indigenous (POCI) Caucus, the Black Maternal Health Caucus, and the Queer Caucus.

Hollins authored a bill to ban the use of conversion therapy for minors and vulnerable adults, which passed the House floor in 2021 and 2023. She also introduced legislation to ban the "gay panic defense" used to plead down murder charges against LGBTQ victims. Hollins sponsored successful legislation to eliminate the statute of limitations on reporting sexual assault.

In 2021, Hollins introduced legislation to ban the use of no-knock warrants in the state of Minnesota, however lawmakers ended up approving a less restrictive policy. After the police killing of Amir Locke, she introduced a bill to further limit no-knocks, which Governor Walz stated he would sign if it came to his desk. That proposal passed the House floor in 2022 as part of a larger public safety bill, but was opposed by Senate Republicans and chair of the Senate Public Safety Committee, Warren Limmer. Hollins has been critical of the Minnesota Police and Peace Officer's Association, stating the MPPOA has been "steadfast in support of the status quo".

Hollins signed on to a letter calling on the Biden administration to stop Line 3, a tar sands pipeline proposed to cut through Minnesota tribal lands. She authored legislation requiring manufacturers to disclose when PFAS chemicals are added to their products, and a bill to jump-start the battery industry for storing renewable energy. Hollins supports legalizing marijuana and expunging prior convictions.

=== Awards ===
Hollins received the Joan and Walter Mondale Award for Public Service at the 2025 Humphrey-Mondale Awards.

== Electoral history ==
2020 DFL Primary for Minnesota State House - District 66B
Party	Candidate	Votes	%
Democratic (DFL)	Athena Hollins	2,974	60.73
Democratic (DFL)	John Lesch (incumbent)	1,923	39.27
Total votes		4,897	100.00

2020 Minnesota State House - District 66B
Party	Candidate	Votes	%
Democratic (DFL)	Athena Hollins	12,871	78.59
Republican	Mikki Murray	3,449	21.06
Write-in		57	0.35
Total votes		16,377	100.0
Democratic (DFL) hold			

2022 Minnesota State House - District 66B
Party	Candidate	Votes	%
Democratic (DFL)	Athena Hollins (incumbent)	8,640	78.42
Republican	Jay Hill	2,364	21.46
Write-in		14	0.13
Total votes		11,018	100.0
Democratic (DFL) hold			

2024 Minnesota State House - District 66B
Party	Candidate	Votes	%
Democratic (DFL)	Athena Hollins (incumbent)	10,864	76.12
Republican	Greg Copeland	3,370	23.61
Write-in		38	0.27
Total votes		14,272	100.0
Democratic (DFL) hold			

== Personal life ==
Hollins lives in the Payne-Phalen neighborhood of Saint Paul, Minnesota, with her spouse.
