= 2018 Minnesota Senate district 13 special election =

District 13 special election, 2018
- November 6, 2018

Minnesota Senate District 13
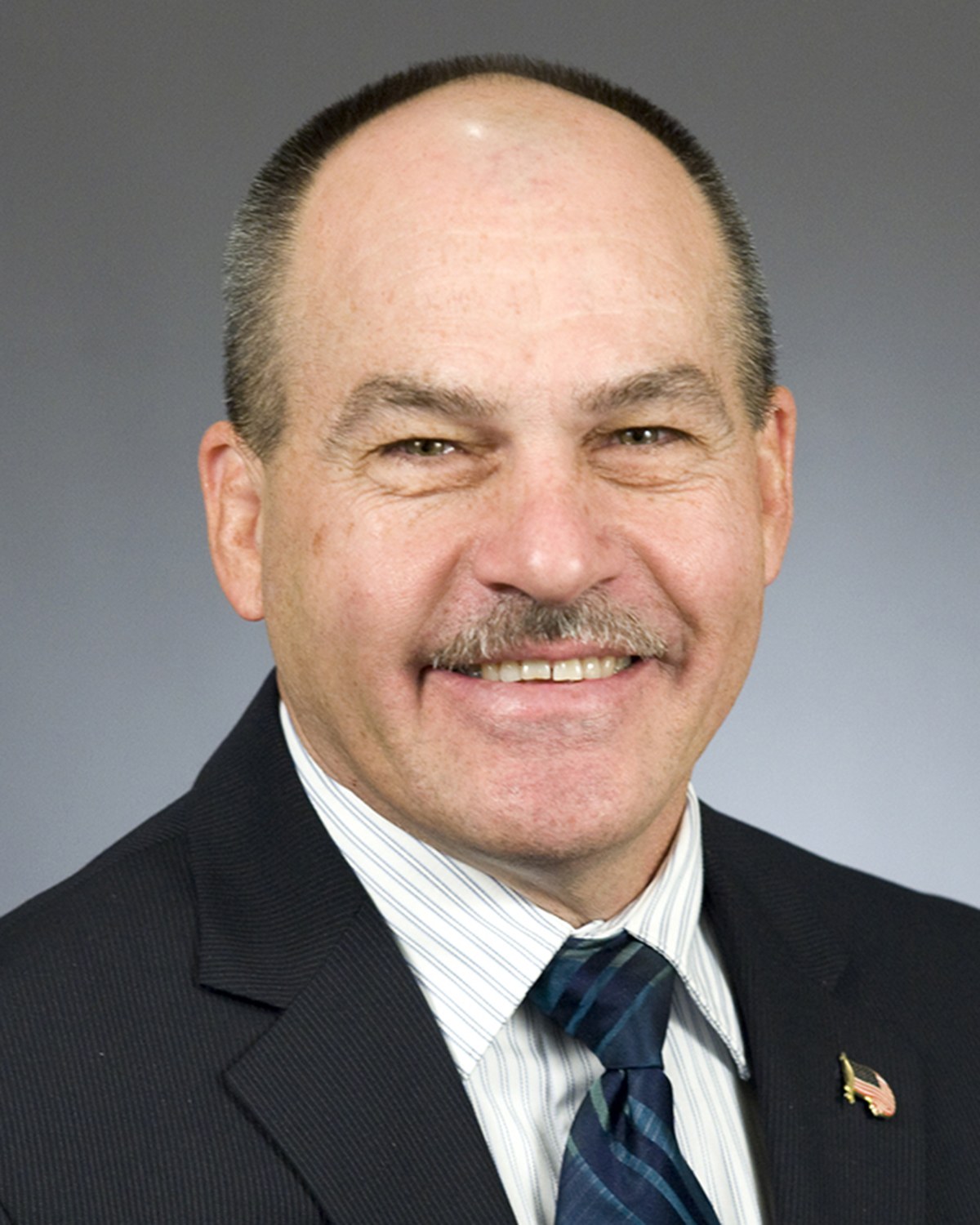

Nominee	Jeff Howe	Joe Perske
Party	Republican	Democratic (DFL)
Popular vote	21,714	16,108
Percentage	57.38%	42.57%
Senator before election
Michelle Fischbach
Republican
Elected Senator
Jeff Howe
Republican

A special election was held in the U.S. state of Minnesota on November 6, 2018, to elect a new senator for District 13 in the Minnesota Senate, caused by the resignation of Republican Senator Michelle Fischbach effective on May 25, 2018. The special election determined which political party would control the Senate given that Fischbach's resignation left it equally divided between the Republicans and the DFL. Jeff Howe won the special election, preserving a Republican one-seat majority. The special election coincided with the 2018 general election.

== Background ==
Location of District 13 and its cities and townships.

In early January 2018, Republican Senator Michelle Fischbach became lieutenant governor after Democratic–Farmer–Labor (DFL) Lieutenant Governor Tina Smith resigned to be appointed to the U.S. Senate. As president of the Senate, Fischbach was first in line to succeed her. She did not resign from the Senate, citing a Senate counsel opinion that she could both hold her Senate seat and be lieutenant governor. Several DFLers disagreed, including Senate Minority Leader Tom Bakk and Minnesota Attorney General Lori Swanson, asserting that holding both positions violated constitutional separation of powers.

On January 12, 2018, Destiny Dusosky, then-chair of the Senate District 13 DFL, filed a lawsuit challenging Fischbach's ability to remain in the Senate. The lawsuit was dismissed without prejudice on February 12, 2018, by Chief Judge John Guthmann of the Minnesota Second District Court in Ramsey County, who said the lawsuit was premature as it was unclear whether the Senate would allow her to continue to serve once the Legislature reconvened later that month. Guthmann also denied a request for a temporary restraining order to prevent Fischbach from serving in the Senate. Dusosky filed a second lawsuit in April 2018, charging that Fischbach's status in the Senate was still undetermined.

On May 25, 2018, Fischbach resigned from the Senate and took the oath of office as lieutenant governor. She said the end of the legislative session and Governor Mark Dayton's pledge that he would not call a special session prompted her decision to resign. Following Fischbach's resignation, Dusosky withdrew her lawsuit. Fischbach said she would not run in the special election.

District 13 includes parts of Benton and Stearns counties. Fischbach became its senator in February 1996 after winning a special election. In the last election in 2016, she won 69% of the vote.

== Candidates ==
The candidate filing period was from May 29 through June 5, 2018. A primary election was not held.

=== Republican Party of Minnesota ===
- Jeff Howe, member of the Minnesota House of Representatives since 2013

=== Minnesota Democratic–Farmer–Labor Party ===
- Joe Perske, member of the Stearns County Board of Commissioners since 2017; DFL nominee for Minnesota's 6th congressional district in 2014; former mayor and City Council member of Sartell, Minnesota

==== Withdrawn ====
- Michael Willemsen, group home site supervisor; DFL nominee for District 13 in 2016

== Results ==
Candidate	Party	Votes	%
Jeff Howe	Republican Party of Minnesota	21,714	57.38
Joe Perske	Minnesota Democratic–Farmer–Labor Party	16,108	42.57
N/A	Write-ins	20	0.05
Total		37,842	100.00
Source: Minnesota Secretary of State

== See also ==
- List of special elections to the Minnesota Senate
