= Dick Cohen =

American politician

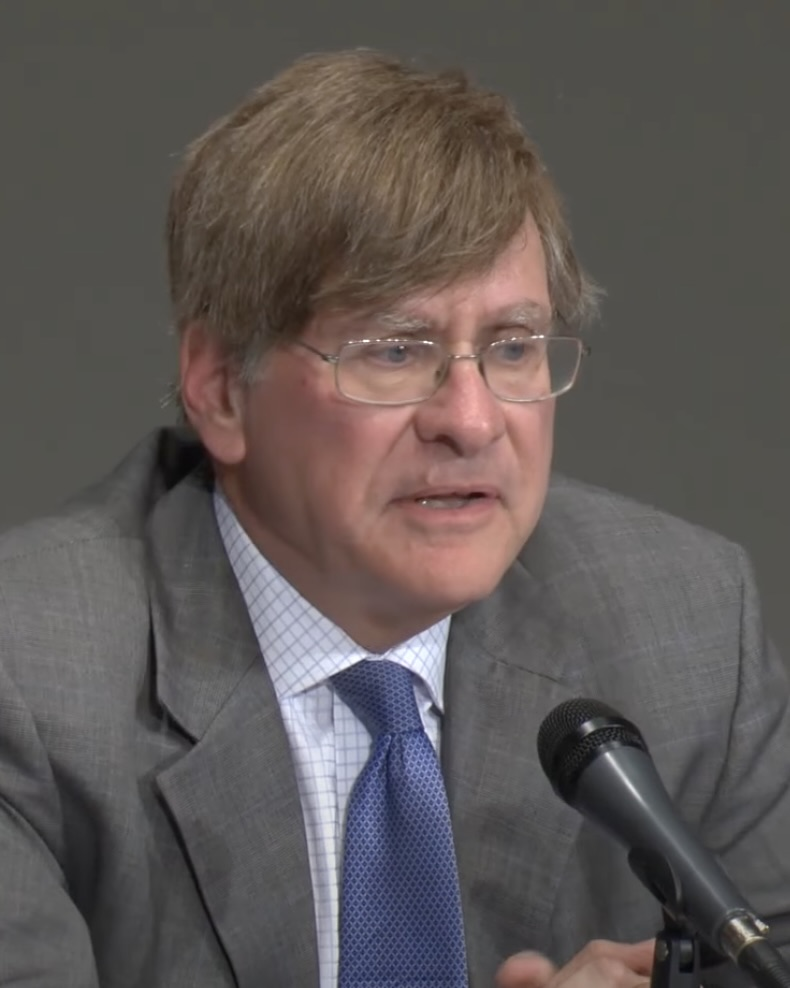

Member of the Minnesota Senate from the 64th district
- In office January 6, 1987 – January 5, 2021
- Preceded by: Ron Sieloff
- Succeeded by: Erin Murphy

Member of the Minnesota House of Representatives from the 64B district
- In office January 4, 1983 – January 5, 1987
- Preceded by: redrawn district
- Succeeded by: Howard Orenstein

Member of the Minnesota House of Representatives from the 63B district
- In office January 4, 1977 – January 2, 1979
- Preceded by: Ron Sieloff
- Succeeded by: John Drew

Personal details
- Born: December 10, 1949 (age 76) Saint Paul, Minnesota
- Party: Minnesota Democratic–Farmer–Labor Party
- Education: Northwestern University; William Mitchell College of Law
- Occupation: attorney, legislator

Richard J. Cohen (born December 10, 1949) is a Minnesota politician and a former member of the Minnesota Senate. A member of the Minnesota Democratic–Farmer–Labor Party (DFL), he represented District 64, which includes portions of the city of Saint Paul in Ramsey County.

== Early life and education ==
Cohen was born in Saint Paul and graduated from Highland Park High School. He earned his B.A. from Northwestern University in Evanston, Illinois, and his J.D. from William Mitchell College of Law in Saint Paul.

== Minnesota Legislature ==
Cohen was first elected to the Minnesota Legislature in 1976. He served as a member of the Minnesota House of Representatives for District 63B and, after redistricting in 1982, for District 64B. He was elected senator for District 64 in 1986, gaining the lone Republican-held Senate seat within the Twin Cities. He was reelected in the 1990, 1992, 1996, 2000, 2002, 2006, 2010, 2012, and 2016 elections.

Cohen was chair of the Senate Finance Committee from 2003 to 2011 and chair of the Senate State Government Finance Committee from 1997 to 2001.

On November 3, 2009, President Barack Obama announced Cohen's appointment to the President's Committee on the Arts and Humanities. Cohen is considered by many to be the leading champion for the arts in the Minnesota Legislature. He led the campaign to include funding for the arts in the Clean Water, Land and Legacy constitutional amendment that Minnesota voters approved in 2008.

In 2019, Erin Murphy announced that she would be running to unseat Cohen in the DFL primary.

On November 17, Cohen announced that he would not be running for re-election in 2020.

== Personal life ==
Cohen serves on the board of the Saint Paul Chamber Orchestra. He previously served on the Guthrie Theater board.

== Electoral history ==
Minnesota Senate 64th district election, 2012
Party	Candidate	Votes	%	±%
Democratic (DFL)	Dick Cohen (incumbent)	33,008	69.67	
Republican	Sharon Anderson	9,069	19.14	
Independent	Scott Larson	5,196	10.97	

Minnesota Senate 64th district election, 2010
Party	Candidate	Votes	%	±%
Democratic (DFL)	Dick Cohen (incumbent)	23,854	70.74	−5.74pp
Republican	Tony Hernandez	9,817	29.11	+5.77pp

Minnesota Senate 64th district election, 2006
Party	Candidate	Votes	%	±%
Democratic (DFL)	Dick Cohen (incumbent)	27,427	76.48	+4.65pp
Republican	Christine Van Tassel	8,369	23.34	−4.61pp

Minnesota Senate 64th district election, 2002
Party	Candidate	Votes	%	±%
Democratic (DFL)	Dick Cohen (incumbent)	27,408	71.83	
Republican	Christopher Johnston	10,664	27.95	

Minnesota Senate 64th district election, 2000
Party	Candidate	Votes	%	±%
Democratic (DFL)	Dick Cohen (incumbent)	26,215	72.31	+11.27pp
Republican	Chris Berg	10,039	27.69	−6.48pp

Minnesota Senate 64th district election, 1996
Party	Candidate	Votes	%	±%
Democratic (DFL)	Dick Cohen (incumbent)	22,539	61.04	−1.40pp
Republican	Joe Zappa	12,618	34.17	+3.52pp

Minnesota Senate 64th district election, 1992
Party	Candidate	Votes	%	±%
Democratic (DFL)	Dick Cohen (incumbent)	25,025	62.44	
Ind.-Republican	Joseph P. McCabe	12,285	30.65	

Minnesota Senate 64th district election, 1990
Party	Candidate	Votes	%	±%
Democratic (DFL)	Dick Cohen (incumbent)	10,841	69.33	+21.73pp
Ind.-Republican	G. Hess	3,702	23.68	−19.22pp

Minnesota Senate 64th district election, 1986
Party	Candidate	Votes	%	±%
Democratic (DFL)	Dick Cohen	11,499	47.6	
Ind.-Republican	Bill Ridley	10,408	42.9	
