= John Rose (Minnesota politician) =

American politician

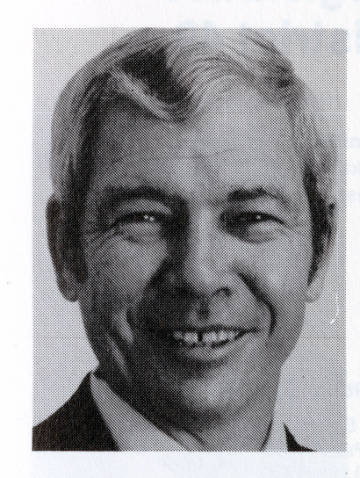
- Rose in 1982

Member of the Minnesota House of Representatives from the 63A district
- In office January 4, 1983 – July 19, 1988
- Preceded by: Kathleen Vellenga
- Succeeded by: Mary Jo McGuire

Member of the Minnesota House of Representatives from the 48B district
- In office January 4, 1977 – January 3, 1983
- Preceded by: Ray W. Faricy
- Succeeded by: Orlando J. Heinitz

Personal details
- Born: John T. Rose; April 22, 1934 Mankato, Minnesota
- Died: July 19, 1988 (aged 54) Maplewood, Minnesota
- Cause of death: Surgical complications
- Party: Independent-Republican
- Spouse: Marilyn Rose
- Children: Kathy (Rose) Gilman, Julie Rose, Daniel Rose, Keith Rose
- Education: Minnesota State University, Mankato
- Profession: Teacher, farmer

Military service
- Allegiance: USA
- Branch/service: Marines

John T. Rose (April 22, 1934 – July 19, 1988) was an American state representative and former teacher from Minnesota. Prior to entering politics, Rose taught at Emmet D. Williams Elementary school and St. Rose of Lima Catholic School in Roseville as a physical education teacher.

== Political career ==
Rose was elected to the Minnesota House of Representatives in 1976 as an Independent-Republican, and was re-elected for five more consecutive terms. He served on committees related to natural resources, energy, and education. He was a member of the House of Representatives from 1977 until 1988.

== Personal life and education ==
Rose attended Mankato State Teachers College where he earned both a Bachelor of Science and a Master of Science in education. Prior to receiving his collegiate education, Rose served in the United States Marine Corps during the Korean War.

He and his wife Marilyn had four children: Kathy, Julie, Dan, and Keith.

Rose was an avid hunter and outdoorsman, who owned 160 acres of hunting and farm land in rural Minnesota.

== Death ==
He died while serving his sixth term on July 19, 1988, aged 54, from complications following an intestinal surgery at St. John's Northeast Hospital in Maplewood, Minnesota.

== Legacy ==
The Guidant John Rose Minnesota Oval in Roseville, Minnesota is named after him for his work in politics as well as his support of youth sports in Roseville. He is praised as being a politician who worked across the aisle to get votes for legislation important to the constituents of his district.
