= Mary Jo McGuire =

American politician (born 1956)

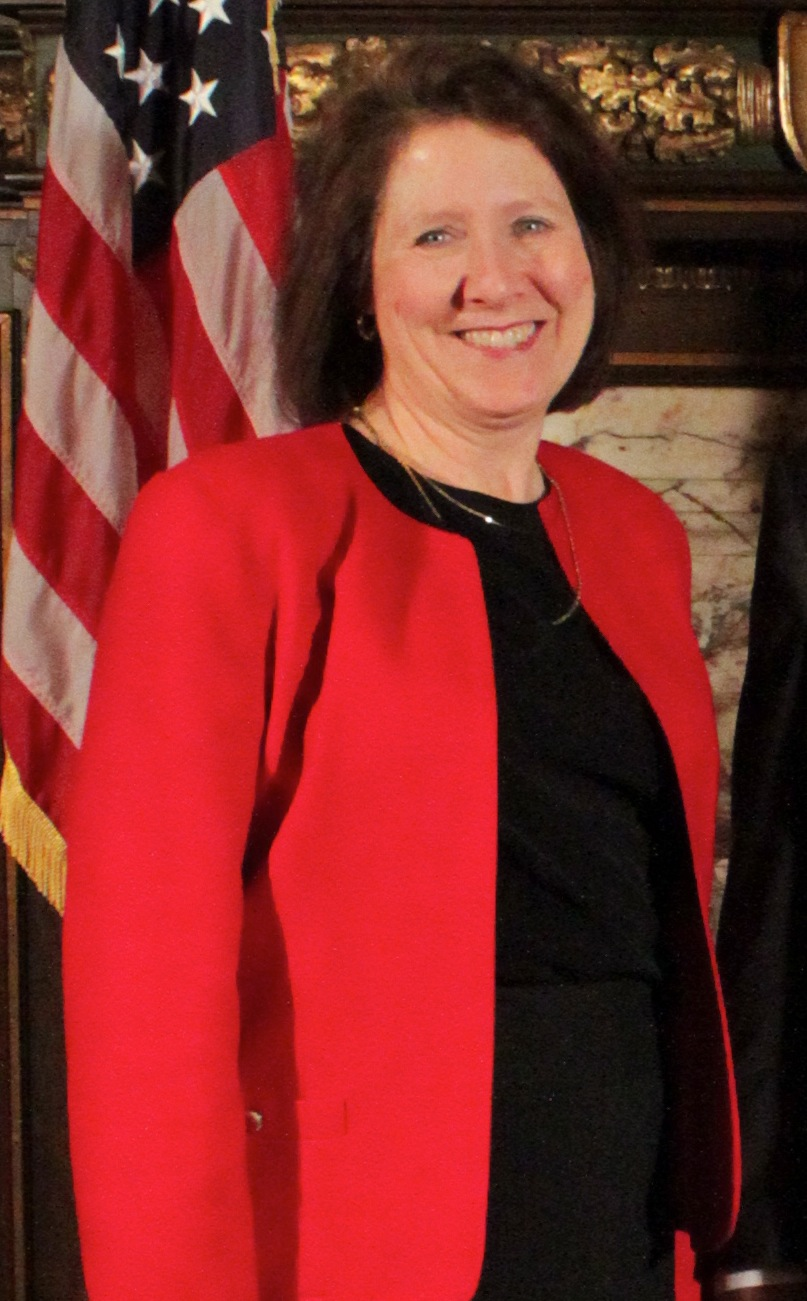
- McGuire in 2012

Member of the Minnesota Senate from the 66th district
- In office April 18, 2011 – January 7, 2013
- Preceded by: Ellen Anderson
- Succeeded by: district redrawn

Member of the Minnesota House of Representatives from the 63A and 54A district
- In office January 3, 1989 – January 6, 2003
- Preceded by: John Rose
- Succeeded by: Alice Hausman

Personal details
- Born: July 29, 1956 (age 70)
- Party: Minnesota Democratic-Farmer-Labor Party
- Education: College of St. Catherine (BA); Hamline University (JD); Harvard University (MPA)
- Profession: attorney, educator, legislator

Mary Jo McGuire (born July 29, 1956) is an American politician and former member of the Minnesota Senate who represented District 66, which included portions of Ramsey County in the Twin Cities metropolitan area. She previously served in the Minnesota House of Representatives from 1989 to 2003, representing District 54A. Prior to the 1992 legislative redistricting, the area was known as District 63A. She currently serves on the Ramsey County Board and was reelected in 2020.

== Professional background ==
A Democrat, McGuire is an attorney and an adjunct professor in the Master of Arts in Organizational Leadership and Political Science departments at St. Catherine University in Saint Paul, and the state director for Project Citizen, a part of the Learning Law and Democracy Foundation. She is also the co-founder and CEO of Great Women's Gear, an online resource for outdoor enthusiasts.

== Service in the Minnesota House ==
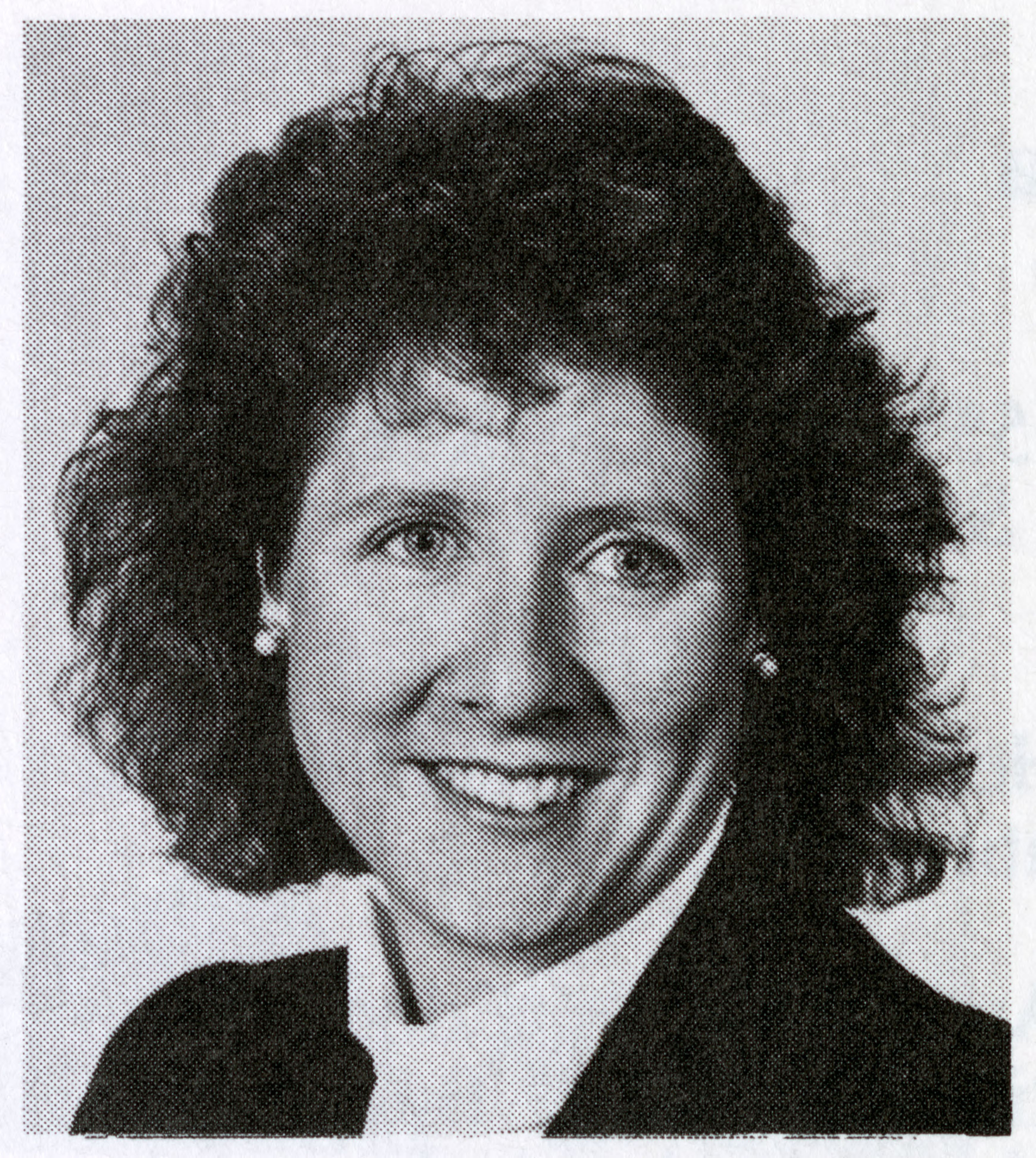
Representative Mary Jo McGuire, 1991-1992 Legislative Session, Minnesota Legislature.

McGuire was first elected to the House in 1988, winning a seat that became vacant after the death of Rep. John Rose on July 19, 1988. She was an assistant majority leader during the 1993–1994 Biennium, and was chair of the Judiciary Subcommittee on Data Practices from 1993 to 1999.

During her time in office, McGuire served on the House's Appropriations, Crime Prevention, Education, Environment and Natural Resources, Environment and Natural Resources Finance, Ethics, Family and Early Childhood Education Finance, Governmental Operations, Housing, Judiciary, Judiciary Finance, Labor-Management Relations, Local Government and Metropolitan Affairs, and Rules and Legislative Administration committees. She was also a member of various subcommittees relevant to each committee.

== 2011 state senate campaign ==
On March 14, 2011, McGuire announced her candidacy for the open Senate District 66 seat. The vacancy arose after Senator Ellen Anderson resigned to accept appointment by Minnesota Governor Mark Dayton as chair of the Minnesota Public Utilities Commission. A DFL Primary was held on March 29, 2011, with McGuire challenging District 66A Rep. John Lesch and attorney Steven Marchese. Prior to the primary election, she received the endorsement of District 66B Rep. Alice Hausman, with whom she had previously served in the House. She subsequently won the primary, garnering 54.07% to Lesch's 36.39% and Marchese's 9.54%. She won the April 12, 2011, special election, garnering 80.25% to GOP challenger Greg Copeland's 19.59% She was sworn in on April 18, 2011.

== Service in the Minnesota Senate ==
McGuire served on the Senate's Energy, Utilities and Telecommunications Committee and the Local Government and Elections Committee.

== Education and early career ==
A lifelong resident of Falcon Heights, McGuire graduated from Alexander Ramsey High School in Roseville, then went on to the College of St. Catherine, receiving her BA in Business Administration in 1978. She went on to the John F. Kennedy School of Government at Harvard University in Cambridge, Massachusetts, receiving her MPA in 1998. She earned her JD from Hamline University School of Law in Saint Paul in 1988. After graduating, she served as a criminal investigator with the Saint Paul City Attorney's Office, and was the director of the Neighborhood Mediation Project.

Minnesota House of Representatives
Preceded by John Rose	Member of the Minnesota House of Representatives from the 63A district 1989–1993	Succeeded by Jean Wagenius
Preceded by Don Valento	Member of the Minnesota House of Representatives from the 54A district 1993–2003	Succeeded by Mindy Greiling
Minnesota Senate
Preceded by Ellen Anderson	Member of the Minnesota Senate from the 66th district 2011–2013	Succeeded by John Marty
