= Stanley N. Thorup =

American politician (1929-1997)

Stanley N. Thorup (September 19, 1929 – September 10, 1997) was an American lawyer and politician.

Thorup was born in Leal, Barnes County, North Dakota. He went to Marshall High School in Minneapolis, Minnesota and served in the United States Army. Thorup graduated from Hamline University and received his law degree from William Mitchell College of Law. He served as a law clerk for the Minnesota Supreme Court. Thorup lived in Blaine, Minnesota with his wife and family and practiced law in Blaine, Minnesota. Thorup served in the Minnesota Senate from 1971 to 1974 and was a Democrat. He served as a Minnesota Municipal Court Judge for Blaine and Spring Lake Park, Minnesota from 1962 to 1969 and as the Anoka County District Court Judge from 1974 to 1997. Thorup died from a heart attack at his cabin on Lake Margaret in Brainerd, Minnesota.
