= Dave Kleis =

American politician

Mayor of St. Cloud, Minnesota
- In office November 21, 2005 – 2025
- Preceded by: John Ellenbecker
- Succeeded by: Jake Anderson

Member of the Minnesota Senate
- In office January 9, 1995 – November 21, 2005
- Preceded by: Joanne Benson
- Succeeded by: Tarryl Clark

Personal details
- Born: January 21, 1964 (age 62)
- Party: Independent
- Other political affiliations: Republican
- Education: St. Cloud State University
- Occupation: Small Business Owner

Dave Kleis (born January 21, 1964) is an American small business owner and politician who served as the mayor of St. Cloud, Minnesota, from 2005 to 2025.

Kleis served in the Minnesota State Senate from 1995 to 2005 as a Republican. In the 2005 St. Cloud mayoral election he defeated incumbent John Ellenbecker.
