= Linda Scheid =

American politician (1942–2011)

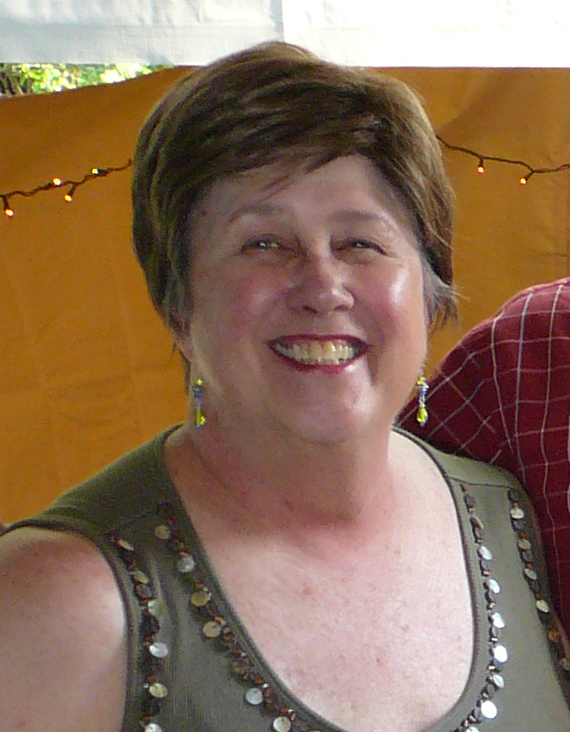

Member of the Minnesota Senate from the 46th district
- In office January 7, 1997 – June 15, 2011
- Preceded by: Don Kramer
- Succeeded by: Chris Eaton

Member of the Minnesota House of Representatives from the 47A district
- In office January 4, 1983 – November 11, 1991

Member of the Minnesota House of Representatives from the 45A district
- In office January 4, 1977 – January 2, 1979

Personal details
- Born: June 16, 1942 Saint Louis Park, Minnesota
- Died: June 15, 2011 (aged 68) Brooklyn Park, Minnesota
- Party: Minnesota Democratic-Farmer-Labor Party
- Children: 2
- Education: Coe College; William Mitchell College of Law
- Occupation: Attorney, Teacher, Legislator

Linda J. Scheid (June 16, 1942 – June 15, 2011) was a Minnesota politician and a member of the Minnesota Senate who represented District 46, which includes portions of the northwestern suburbs of Hennepin County in the Twin Cities metro area. A Democrat, she was first elected to the Senate in 1996, and was re-elected in 2000, 2002, 2006 and 2010. Prior to the 2002 redistricting, the area was known as District 47. She died of cancer on June 15, 2011. Her seat was won in special election on October 18, 2011 by Senator Chris Eaton.

== Leadership in the Minnesota House and Senate ==
Before being elected to the Senate, Scheid served in the Minnesota House of Representatives, representing District 45A from 1977–79, and, after the 1982 redistricting, District 47A from 1983-91. While in the House, she was chair of the General Legislation, Veterans Affairs and Gaming Subcommittee on Elections from 1987-91. She resigned her House seat on November 1, 1991, to become Vice President for Community Affairs with Burnet Realty.

Scheid was a member of the Senate's Commerce and Consumer Protection, Education, and Judiciary and Public Safety committees. She also served on the Rules and Administration Subcommittee for Ethical Conduct. She was chair of the Senate Commerce and Consumer Protection Committee from 2003-11. She was also chair of the Jobs, Energy and Community Development Committee from 2003-05 (called the Jobs, Housing and Community Development Committee during the 2003 session).

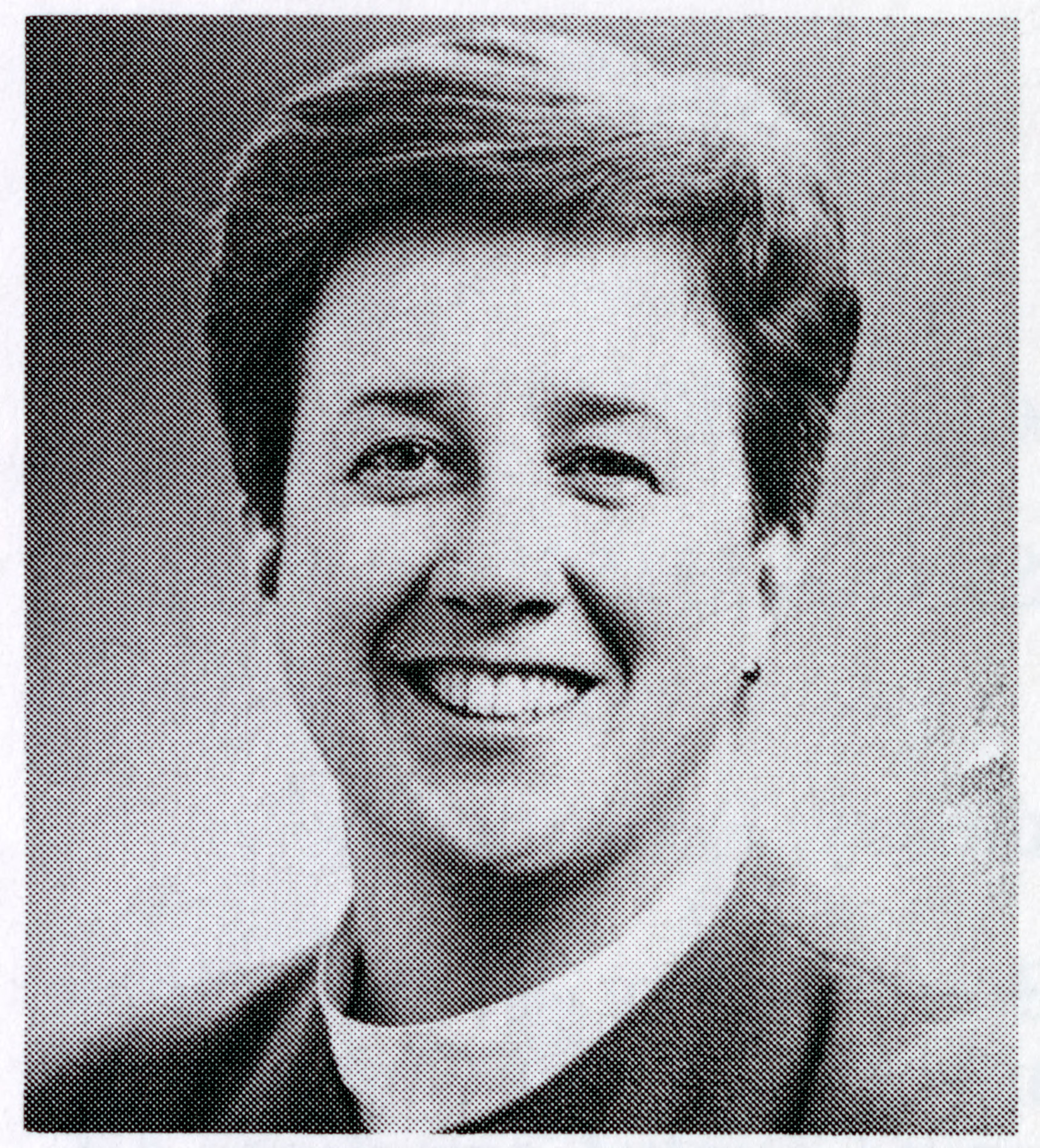
Portrait of Representative Linda J. Scheid, 1991-1992 Legislative Session, Minnesota Legislature.

Her special legislative concerns included public school funding, property tax reform, parent involvement in student learning, crime prevention, health care, election and ethics issues, jobs and economic development, E-16 education, funding for roads and transit, and business.

== Health ==
In 1999, doctors at the Mayo Clinic discovered a growth on Scheid's left kidney. The growth was removed, along with 20 percent of her kidney. During a checkup in 2005, doctors found another growth in her ovaries and diagnosed her with ovarian cancer. After surgery and chemotherapy, the cancer entered remission, but returned in 2010. In early May 2011, treatments became ineffective, and she decided to stop chemotherapy. She spent her last weeks at home with her family and friends, where she was in hospice care until her death on June 15, 2011, one day before her birthday.

== Education and community service ==
Scheid attended St. Louis Park High School in St. Louis Park, then went on to Coe College in Cedar Rapids, Iowa, where she received her B.A. in German and English. She later attended William Mitchell College of Law in Saint Paul, where she earned her J.D.

After college, Scheid served in the United States Peace Corps, teaching English in Asmara, Ethiopia. She was a member of Brooklyn Park's Minnesota Bicentennial Task Force from 1975-76. She was also a member of the League of Women Voters, the Minneapolis Girls' Club, and the Mrs. Jaycees, of which she was a former state vice president.
