= Andy Dawkins =

American politician and attorney

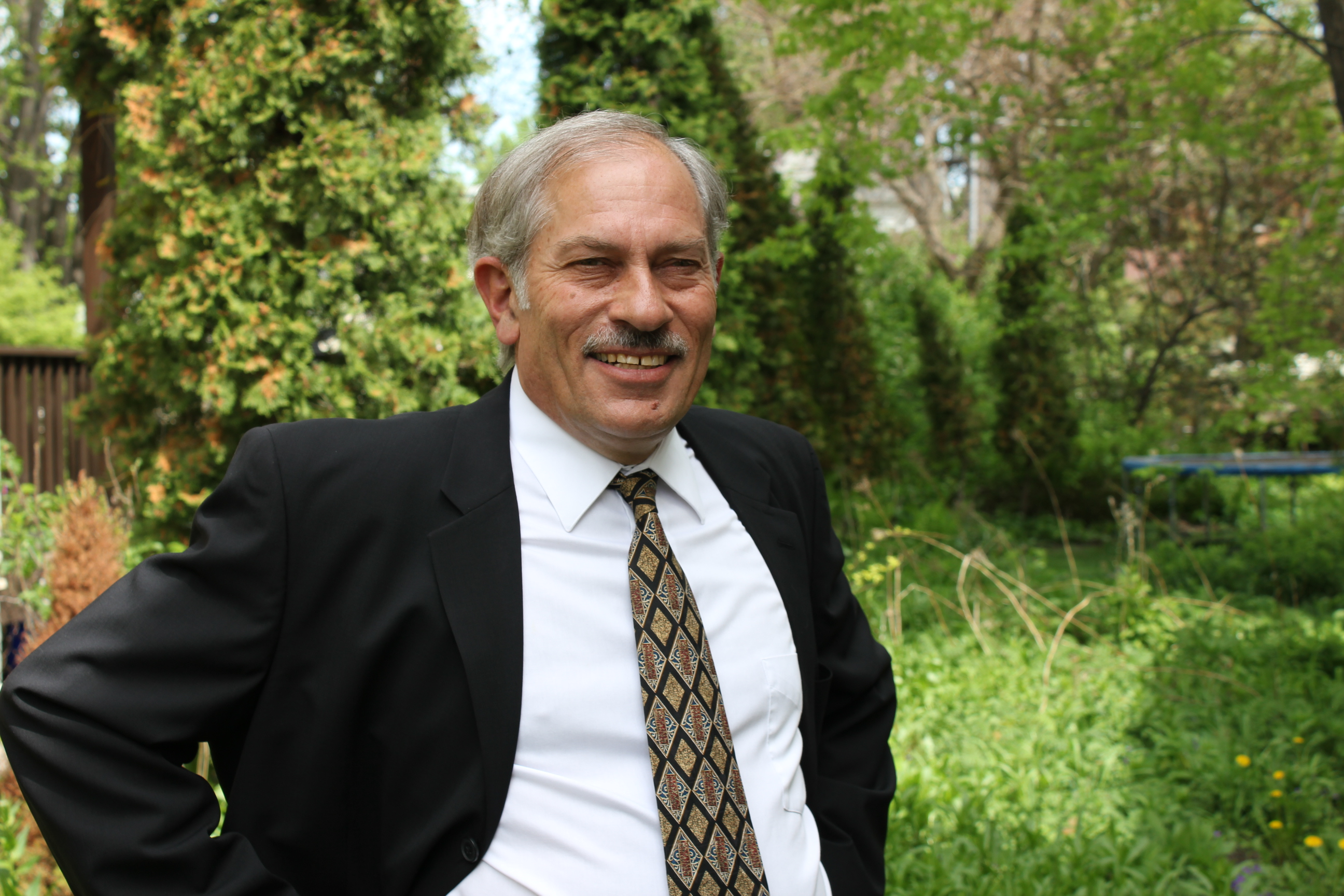
- Andy Dawkins in 2014

Member of the Minnesota House of Representatives from the 65A district
- In office 1987–2003
- Preceded by: Fred Norton
- Succeeded by: Cy Thao

Personal details
- Born: July 29, 1950 (age 76)
- Party: Green (2014-present); Democratic-DFL (1987-2014)
- Spouse: Ellen R. Anderson (m. 1995; div. 2018)
- Children: 2
- Education: Hamline University; Temple University Beasley School of Law
- Profession: Attorney
- Website: Dawkins for Attorney General

Andrew J. Dawkins (born July 29, 1950) is an American politician and attorney from Minnesota. Dawkins is a former member of the Minnesota House of Representatives from Saint Paul. Running as a Democrat, Dawkins was first elected in 1986 to represent District 65A, and was reelected every two years until opting not to seek reelection in 2002. In 1993, he ran an unsuccessful campaign for mayor of Saint Paul against Norm Coleman. He married Ellen Anderson, a Minnesota state senator from St. Paul, in 1995; they divorced in 2018. He was the Green Party of Minnesota nominee for Minnesota Attorney General in the 2014 election, earning 1.5% of the vote and restoring the party's minor-party status.

== Biography ==
Originally from Chicago, Dawkins came to Minnesota in the late 1960s to attend the Hamline University School of Law in St. Paul. During law school, he moved to Philadelphia to work with homeless youth, but intended to return to Minnesota. In 1978, he established a neighborhood law practice in Saint Paul's Frogtown neighborhood and set a personal goal of gaining election to the Legislature within 10 years. Before joining the Legislature, Dawkins said it was important to him that he get to know the neighborhood and its residents' concerns, so he volunteered for a number of community organizations and the Minnesota Democratic–Farmer–Labor Party.

First elected to the House in a November 1987 special election, Dawkins filled the District 65A seat vacated by former Speaker of the House Fred Norton (DFL-St. Paul) upon Norton's appointment to the state Court of Appeals.

After leaving the legislature in 2003, Dawkins led the department of Neighborhood Housing and Property Improvement for the city of Saint Paul for several years. In 2006, he began working as an attorney at the law firm of Mansfield, Tanick, and Cohen.

In June 2014, Dawkins announced that he would run for Minnesota Attorney General under the Minnesota Green Party banner. While Dawkins' 1.49% of the vote in the November election re-qualified the Green Party for minor-party status, he failed to meet the 5% threshold to elevate it to the major-party status it once held in Minnesota.

== Minnesota House of Representatives ==
Dawkins served on several House committees during his time in the Minnesota House, including those governing capital investment, family and civil law, energy and regulated industries, environment and natural resources, financial institutions and insurance, housing, jobs and economic development, and taxes.

He also sponsored youth works legislation to provide college tuition to students volunteering in communities, much like the AmeriCorps program; the Great Northern Corridor economic development project; and a homeownership program for urban and low-income residents. Dawkins also sponsored several measures in an effort to raise awareness of drug crimes and prostitution problems in Frogtown and to study racial bias in the state court system.

== Positions ==
=== Money in Politics ===
As a DFL State Legislator for 15 years, Dawkins saw firsthand how money dictated what got done in government:

I had enough seniority as a democrat to be the tax chair in the Minnesota Legislature but I was told 'Dawkins you'll never be the tax chair 'cause you pissed off the real-estate industry, you pissed off the bankers, and you tried to do the tax stuff the right way for the little guys and they’re not going to let you be the tax chair'. I was told that I'm not going to be the tax chair unless I can get these big lobbyists to support me to be the tax chair. Minnesota's no different than Washington; big money runs our country on every level these days.

Who gets to run, who gets elected, what gets enacted, who gets served by what gets enacted is all ruled by big money these days. I would get the million dollars once in a while for a little housing program or start a youth program ... but when you're talking about the hundreds of millions of dollars that's at play all the time in politics; if the insurance companies don't like your bill then it ain't gonna move, if you don't write something in so that they come out o.k. the bankers and the finance industries and the lenders will put a stop to it, it's up and down the line.

=== Sulfide/Copper Nickel Mining ===
Dawkins is strongly opposed to the Polymet Mining Corporation and Twin Metals Minnesota LLC proposed sulfide/copper-nickel mines in northern Minnesota. Because of the threat of acid mine drainage to the Boundary Waters Canoe Area Wilderness and the short term nature of the jobs these mines will create, Dawkins had this to say:

I don't think we need to do any sort of sulfide mining, period ... the whole thing is about profit for foreign investors, and to then argue there's a few jobs in the mining industry, well, compare that to the amount of jobs we'd get if we keep doing renewables and sustainables. Until we have that debate, I'm totally against.

=== Electoral reform ===
In 1994, Dawkins accepted the Twin Cities Area New Party's nomination alongside his state representative candidacy under the Minnesota Democratic–Farmer–Labor Party. However, state law prohibited fusion voting, resulting in the 1997 US Supreme Court decision Timmons v. Twin Cities Area New Party, which upheld such laws as beyond the scope of the First Amendment's freedom of association. Dawkins supported Saint Paul's instant-runoff voting ballot initiative. While running for Minnesota Attorney General, Dawkins endorsed ranked-choice voting.

=== Cannabis Legalization ===
Dawkins supports legalizing "sensible" use of recreational marijuana.

== Electoral history ==
2000 Minnesota State Representative District 65A General Election
Party	Candidate	Votes	%	±%
Democratic (DFL)	Andy Dawkins	6963	64%	
Independence	Cy Thao	2517	23.13%	
Republican	Fred Tennison	1400	12.87%	

1998 Minnesota State Representative District 65A General Election
Party	Candidate	Votes	%	±%
Democratic (DFL)	Andy Dawkins	6620	78.4%	
Republican	Fred Tennison	1790	21.2%	

1996 Minnesota State Representative District 65A General Election
Party	Candidate	Votes	%	±%
Democratic (DFL)	Andy Dawkins	8185	82%	
Republican	Fred Tennison	1791	17.95%	

1994 Minnesota State Representative District 65A General Election
Party	Candidate	Votes	%	±%
Democratic (DFL)	Andy Dawkins	5735	79.74%	
Republican	David Haspel	1457	20.25%	

1992 Minnesota State Representative District 65A General Election
Party	Candidate	Votes	%	±%
Democratic (DFL)	Andy Dawkins	8417	78.7%	
Republican	Eunice Smith	2278	21.3%	

1990 Minnesota State Representative District 65A General Election
Party	Candidate	Votes	%	±%
Democratic (DFL)	Andy Dawkins	6069	77%	
Republican	Eunice Smith	1813	23%	

1988 Minnesota State Representative District 65A General Election
Party	Candidate	Votes	%	±%
Democratic (DFL)	Andy Dawkins	8019	77.6%	
Republican	Eunice Smith	2294	22.4%	

1987 Minnesota State Representative District 65A Special Election
Party	Candidate	Votes	%	±%
Democratic (DFL)	Andy Dawkins	1950	77%	
Republican	Eunice Smith	589	23%	

== See also ==
- Politics of Minnesota
- Green Party of Minnesota
- Green Party of the United States
- Green Politics
- Frogtown
