= Tarryl Clark =

American politician (born 1961)

Tarryl L. Clark
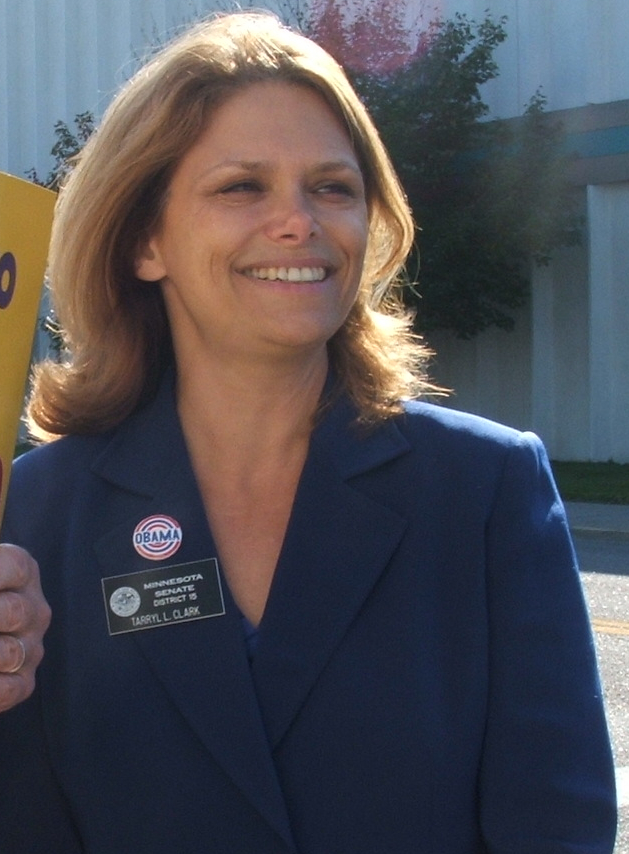
- Clark in 2008

Member of the Minnesota Senate from the 15th district
- In office January 6, 2006 – January 3, 2011
- Preceded by: Dave Kleis
- Succeeded by: John Pederson

Personal details
- Born: July 31, 1961 (age 65) Norfolk, Virginia, U.S.
- Party: Democratic (DFL)
- Spouse: Doug Clark
- Children: 2
- Education: Drake University; Arizona State University; William Mitchell College of Law
- Occupation: community activist, attorney, legislator
- Website: tarrylclark.com

Tarryl Lynn Clark (born July 31, 1961) is an American activist, attorney, politician and a former member of the Minnesota Senate. A Democrat, she represented District 15, including portions of Benton, Sherburne, and Stearns counties, from 2006 to 2011. She was a Democratic-Farmer-Labor Party nominee for United States Congress in 2010, unsuccessfully challenging incumbent Republican Michele Bachmann.

In 2011, Clark sought the Democratic nomination to challenge Republican congressman Chip Cravaack in Minnesota's 8th congressional district, but lost the endorsement to Rick Nolan, who went on to win the August 2012 primary.

== Early life and education ==
Clark was born in Norfolk, Virginia, where her father was serving in the United States Navy. She is the oldest of four children. She has three brothers, two of whom also went on to serve in the Navy.

While growing up, Clark was active in her school, church and community, joining Girl Scouts and 4-H. She frequently volunteered in her church, where she sang in the choir, taught Sunday school, and was one of the first female acolytes in her parish.

Clark attended Drake University and graduated with a B.A. in Sociology. She later earned a Master's Degree in Education from Arizona State University. In 1992, she graduated cum laude from the William Mitchell College of Law in St. Paul, Minnesota, and she is a licensed attorney.

== Early career ==
In 1983, Clark developed the Young Adult Program at the Center for Youth Resources to help teenagers and young mothers develop needed skills to get jobs and raise families. Working with the Land of Lakes Girl Scouts, she developed a teen outreach program to mentor young girls. As a Program Coordinator at the YWCA, she developed and led a teen pregnancy prevention program.

In 1990, Clark was a founding member of Central Minnesota's Habitat for Humanity. She became the organization's first director, growing the volunteer base from 0 to 400. She and her husband remain active with Habitat.

As Executive Director of the Minnesota Community Action Partnership from 1998 to 2006, Clark worked with Community Action agencies and Head Start Programs across Minnesota. She traveled to towns and cities across Minnesota, talking with community leaders and volunteers about helping people through activities like Meals on Wheels, emergency shelters, and other local and regional efforts.

In 2003, after the death of DFL Associate Chair Mary McEvoy in the plane crash that also claimed the lives of Senator Paul and Sheila Wellstone, Clark was elected Associate Chair of the Minnesota Democratic-Farmer-Labor Party (DFL).

== Political career ==
=== State Senate ===
In December 2005, Clark won a special election to succeed outgoing Republican Senator Dave Kleis, who was elected mayor of St. Cloud. She was reelected to a full four-year term in the 2006 general election. Clark received the highest number of votes of any candidate in any race in Senate District 15: 15,581, representing 56.3% of the vote. Clark's district included portions of Benton, Sherburne, and Stearns counties.

In 2006, Clark was elected Senate Assistant Majority Leader by her colleagues.

Clark was a member of the Senate's Education, Higher Education, and Rules & Administration committees. She also served on the Finance subcommittees for the E-12 Education Budget and Policy Division, and for the Higher Education Budget and Policy Division, and on the Rules & Administration subcommittees for Conference Committees, and for Permanent and Joint Rules.

=== 2010 U.S. Congressional campaign ===
In July 2009, Clark announced her candidacy for the 2010 Democratic nomination in Minnesota's 6th Congressional District, a seat held then by Representative Michele Bachmann. After just 22 weeks in the race, Clark reported raising more than $600,000 in 2009 from more than 5,000 individual donors.

On January 28, 2010, Clark formally launched her campaign and embarked on a 6-day "Working for You" Tour of Minnesota's 6th District.

Clark was endorsed by several high-profile elected officials, including Vice President Walter Mondale, Senator Al Franken, and Representative Jim Oberstar, as well as former 6th District candidates Patty Wetterling and El Tinklenberg. Democratic Representatives Keith Ellison and Collin Peterson contributed to Clark's campaign.

Clark received the Democratic-Farmer-Labor (DFL) endorsement in March 2010. She was also endorsed by nearly every prominent union in the state, including Minnesota AFL-CIO, Education Minnesota, Teamsters Joint Council 32, AFSCME Council 5, AFSCME Council 65, North Central States Regional Council of Carpenters, UNITE HERE Minnesota, Laborers District Council of Minnesota and North Dakota, SEIU Minnesota State Council, Minnesota Nurses Association, International Union of Operating Engineers (IUOE) Local 49, Take Action Minnesota, and the Saint Cloud State College Democrats. Clark was also endorsed by EMILY's List, womenwinning, and the Women's Campaign Forum. In July 2010, the Minnesota Police and Peace Officers Association endorsed Clark over Bachmann. A spokesman for the organization said that its board of directors was "conservative in nature" but had endorsed Clark because of her "clear record of supporting our profession." She also received the endorsement of the St. Cloud Times newspaper.

Clark was defeated by Bachmann 52% to 38%.

=== 2012 U.S. Congressional campaign ===
On May 8, 2011, Clark announced that she was seeking the DFL nomination for Minnesota's 8th district in 2012. The seat was then held by Chip Cravaack, who defeated Jim Oberstar in 2010. On August 14, 2012, Clark lost the primary election to Rick Nolan.

2018 Stearns County Commissioner campaign

On November 6, 2018, Clark won election to the Stearns County board of commissioners representing the first district.

== Leadership awards ==
In February 2010, Clark was recognized by the St. Cloud Times as one of the area's "10 most influential people of the decade."

In 2009, Clark received two awards for her legislation achievements: the Legislator of Distinction award for supporting city-friendly legislation by the League of Minnesota Cities; and the Legislator of the Year by the Minnesota Association of Professional Employees.

In 2008, Clark was honored by Central Minnesota Habitat for Humanity for her contribution to Women Build 2008.

== Personal life ==
Clark and her husband, Doug, have two sons, Colin and Nathan. They have lived in St. Cloud for over 20 years. She attends St. John's Church in St. Cloud and is an active member of the St. Cloud Rotary.
