= Chokio-Alberta High School =

Location
- 311 1st St W Chokio, Minnesota 56221; United States

Information
- Type: Public
- Established: 1967
- School district: ISD 771
- Principal: Tate Jerome
- Teaching staff: 7.50 (FTE)
- Grades: 7-12
- Student to teacher ratio: 9.20
- Color
- Mascot: Spartans
- Song: Wave the Flag
- Website: www.chokioalberta.k12.mn.us

Chokio-Alberta High School is a public high school with students in grades Pre-K through twelve, located in Chokio, Minnesota, United States. The school was formed as a merger between Chokio elementary school and Alberta High School. The school's mascot is the Spartans, though when playing with Morris Area High School they are known as the MACA Tigers.
