= Chris Eaton (politician) =

American politician (born 1954)

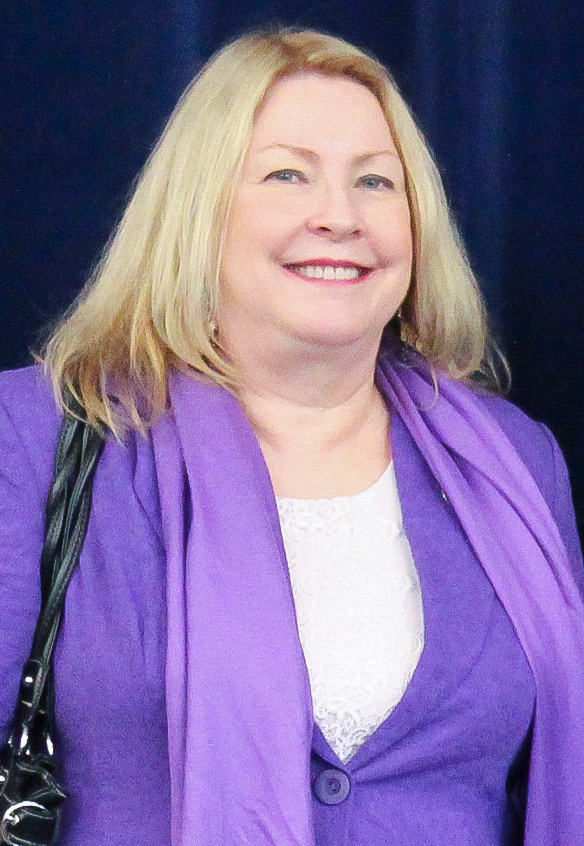

Member of the Minnesota Senate from the 40th district 46th (2011–2013)
- In office October 28, 2011 – January 2023
- Preceded by: Linda Scheid

Personal details
- Born: January 5, 1954 (age 72) Mankato, Minnesota
- Party: Minnesota Democratic–Farmer–Labor Party
- Spouse: Tim Willson
- Children: 2
- Education: Anoka-Ramsey Community College
- Occupation: registered nurse, legislator

Christine Ann "Chris" Eaton (born January 5, 1954) is an American politician and former member of the Minnesota Senate. A member of the Minnesota Democratic–Farmer–Labor Party (DFL), she represented District 40, which includes the cities of Brooklyn Center and Brooklyn Park in Hennepin County in the Twin Cities metropolitan area.

== Early life, education, and career ==
Eaton is a graduate of Anoka-Ramsey Community College, where she earned her nursing degree.

Eaton is a registered nurse and a member of the Minnesota Nurses Association. She has been Director of Health Services at Mental Health Resources since 2009, and previously worked as a nurse at Ramsey County Mental Health Initiative from 1998 to 2008, and as a nurse and human services tech at Anoka Metro Regional Treatment Center from 1991 to 1998.

== Minnesota Senate ==
Eaton won a special election held on October 18, 2011, filling a seat that was vacated following the death of long-time Senator Linda Scheid on June 15, 2011. Following redistricting Eaton was placed in District 40. She ran unopposed in 2012 and was reelected in 2016. Eaton was reelected in 2020, and served on the following committees:

- Environment and Natural Resources Finance
- Health and Human Services Finance and Policy
- Ranking Minority Chair of Human Services Licensing Policy

== Personal life ==
Eaton and her husband, Tim Willson, are the parents of two children. He was mayor of Brooklyn Center, but lost the mayoral election in 2018 to Mike Elliot.
