= Edward G. Novak =

American politician (1917-2002)

Member of the Minnesota Senate from the 64th district previously 38th, 47th, 45th
- Preceded by: Boleslaw G. Novak
- Succeeded by: Peter P. Stumpf Jr.

Personal details
- Born: April 16, 1917 Saint Paul, Minnesota
- Died: November 4, 2002 (aged 85) Saint Paul, Minnesota
- Party: = Democratic (DFL)

Edward G. Novak (April 16, 1917 - November 4, 2002) was an American politician, attorney, and FBI agent. A member of the Minnesota Democratic-Farmer-Labor Party, he served in the Minnesota Senate from 1959 to 1974.

== Early life and career ==
Novak was born in Saint Paul, Minnesota, on April 16, 1917. His father Boleslaw G. "Bill" Novak, a grocery store owner, served in the Minnesota House of Representatives from 1915 to 1918 and the Minnesota Senate from 1935 to 1958 as a member of the nonpartisan liberal caucus. Edward graduated from Cretin High School, a Catholic school in Saint Paul. He later attended some school at the College of St. Thomas and the University of Minnesota before receiving a law degree from the St. Paul College of Law. Prior to his political career, he worked in several government agencies, including as an enforcement officer with the War Assets Administration and as an FBI agent in the 1940s.

== Minnesota Senate ==
Novak was elected to the Minnesota Senate in 1958, directly succeeding his father in district 38. As a senator, he represented parts of Ramsey County for a decade and a half; before the state returned to partisan elections, he was a nonpartisan member of the liberal caucus. He opposed a general sales tax and wrote a 1969 ballot question that, if it had passed, would have consolidated Saint Paul, its closest suburbs, and Ramsey County into a single city-county government. In June 1974, he left office to accept an appointment as the commissioner of the Minnesota Department of Public Safety, triggering a special election that November. At the time of his appointment, Novak was the chairman of the Senate Finance Committee.

== Personal life ==
Novak lived his whole life in Saint Paul, much of it with his wife Maridee. He had three children and two grandchildren. He died of cancer in his Saint Paul home on November 4, 2002.
