= Jim Abeler =

American politician (born 1954)

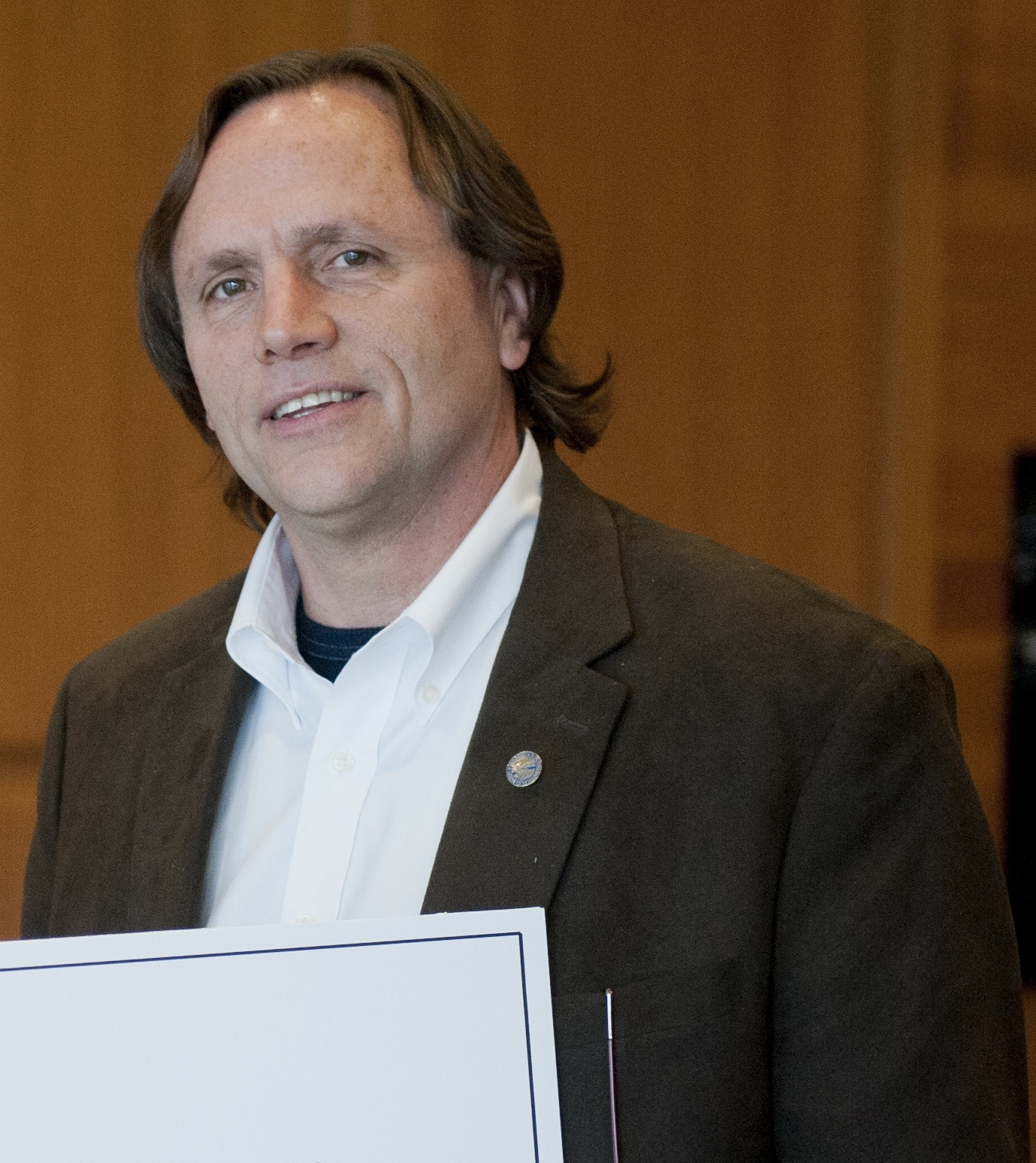
- Abeler in 2012

Member of the Minnesota Senate from the 35th district
- Incumbent
- Assumed office February 22, 2016
- Preceded by: Branden Petersen
- Succeeded by: Angela Nelson (elect)

Member of the Minnesota House of Representatives from the 35A district 48B (2003-2013), 49A (1999-2003)
- In office January 5, 1999 – January 5, 2015
- Preceded by: Charlie Weaver
- Succeeded by: Abigail Whelan

Personal details
- Born: May 18, 1954 (age 72) Minneapolis, Minnesota, U.S.
- Party: Republican
- Spouse: Barb
- Children: 6
- Education: University of Minnesota; Hamline University; Northwestern College of Chiropractic
- Occupation: Chiropractor

James J. Abeler II (/ˈeɪblər/ AY-blər; born May 18, 1954) is a Minnesota politician and member of the Minnesota Senate. A member of the Republican Party of Minnesota, he represents District 35 in the northern Twin Cities metropolitan area. He formerly represented District 35A in the Minnesota House of Representatives.

== Early life and education ==
Abeler was born in Minneapolis. He graduated from Anoka High School in Anoka, then attended the University of Minnesota and Hamline University in Saint Paul. He earned his D.C. from Northwestern College of Chiropractic in Bloomington in 1979. In the late 1990s, he founded PACT Charter School in Anoka.

== Minnesota Legislature ==
=== Minnesota House of Representatives ===
Abeler was first elected to the Minnesota House of Representatives in 1998 and was reelected every two years until 2014, when he ran unsuccessfully in the Republican primary for the U.S. Senate. Before the 2002 legislative redistricting, he represented the old District 49A. He chaired the Health Policy and Finance Subcommittee for the Health Care Cost Containment Division during the 2005-06 biennium.

=== Minnesota Senate ===
Abeler won election to the Minnesota Senate in a special election on February 9, 2016 and took office on February 22. In 2022, he gained notoriety for unwittingly approving a DFL-sponsored bill that legalized THC edibles derived from hemp.

== 2014 U.S. Senate campaign ==
Abeler was a candidate in the 2014 U.S. Senate election in Minnesota. He lost the Republican nomination to Mike McFadden.

== Political stances ==
Abeler formed the MN Autism Council in 2018. He was subsequently criticized for appointing Wayne Rohde, cofounder of the Vaccine Safety Council of Minnesota, to the council in 2019. Rohde is a prominent vaccine skeptic and an executive for Health Choice, which advocates for health conditions in children "caused by side effects of vaccine choices."

During the COVID-19 pandemic, in November 2020, Abeler opened a bar called Nucky's Speakeasy as a co-owner. He had owned the Anoka building in which it opened since 1994. The bar was named after Atlantic City racketeer Enoch Lewis "Nucky" Johnson.

== Personal life ==
Abeler is married to Barb and they have six children. He is a Baptist and a chiropractor.
