= Jeff Howe =

American politician

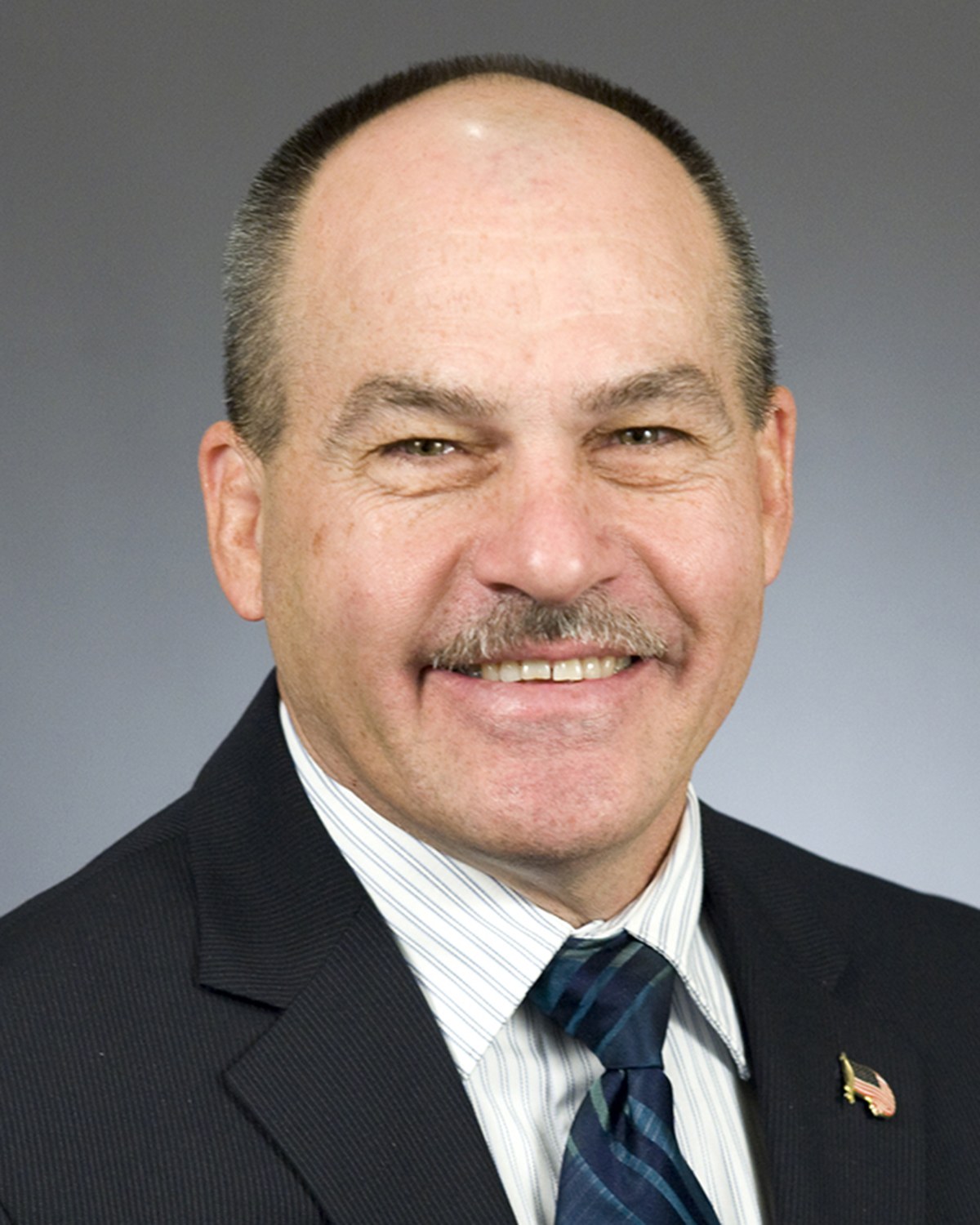

Member of the Minnesota Senate from the 13th district
- Incumbent
- Assumed office December 11, 2018
- Preceded by: Michelle Fischbach

Member of the Minnesota House of Representatives from the 13A district
- In office January 8, 2013 – December 10, 2018
- Preceded by: Larry Hosch (District 14B)
- Succeeded by: Lisa Demuth

Personal details
- Born: June 15, 1959 (age 67) Morris, Minnesota, U.S.
- Party: Republican
- Spouse: Sheri Howe
- Children: 4
- Education: St. Cloud State University (BA)
- Occupation: consultant

Jeff Howe (/haʊ/ HOW; born June 15, 1959) is an American politician and member of the Minnesota Senate. A member of the Republican Party of Minnesota, he represents District 13 in central Minnesota. He is a former member of the Minnesota House of Representatives, representing District 13A.

== Early life, education, and career ==
Howe grew up on a farm near Chokio, Minnesota, and graduated from Chokio-Alberta High School. He attended St. Cloud State University, graduating with a Bachelor of Arts.

Howe was a member of the United States Armed Forces for 38 years, first in the Navy and later in the Minnesota Army National Guard. He retired in 2017 with the rank of lieutenant colonel. He was a member of the Rockville city council and is now a consultant.

== Minnesota Legislature ==
Howe was first elected to the Minnesota House of Representatives in 2012. He did not seek reelection in 2018 in order to seek election to the Minnesota Senate, which he won. After being reelected in 2020 and 2022, Howe announced on November 24, 2025, that he would not seek reelection in 2026 and would retire at the end of his term in January 2027.

== Personal life ==
Howe is married to Sheri Howe. They have four children and reside in Rockville, Minnesota. His brother John Howe is a former Minnesota state senator. He is Lutheran.
