= Ron Sieloff =

American politician

Member of the Minnesota Senate from the 64th district
- In office 1983–1986

Member of the Minnesota Senate from the 63rd district
- In office 1977–1982

Member of the Minnesota House of Representatives from the 63B district
- In office 1975–1976

Personal details
- Born: May 30, 1944 (age 82) Thief River Falls, Minnesota, U.S.
- Party: Republican
- Education: William Mitchell College of Law
- Occupation: attorney

Ronald B. Sieloff (born May 30, 1944) is an American politician in the state of Minnesota. He served in the Minnesota House of Representatives and Minnesota Senate.
