= Branden Petersen =

American politician (born 1986)

Member of the Minnesota Senate from the 35th district
- In office January 8, 2013 – October 31, 2015
- Preceded by: redrawn district
- Succeeded by: Jim Abeler

Member of the Minnesota House of Representatives from the 49B district
- In office January 4, 2011 – January 7, 2013
- Preceded by: Jerry Newton
- Succeeded by: district redrawn

Personal details
- Born: February 4, 1986 (age 40)
- Party: Republican Party of Minnesota
- Spouse: Jessica Erickson (m. 2010)
- Children: 2
- Occupation: sales manager, legislator

Branden Petersen (born February 4, 1986) is a Minnesota politician and former member of the Minnesota Senate. A member of the Republican Party of Minnesota, he represented District 35, which includes portions of Anoka County in the northern Twin Cities metropolitan area. From 2011 to 2013 he was a member of the Minnesota House of Representatives representing District 49B.

== Early life and education ==
Petersen has lived in his district since he was eight years old, playing Little League and Legion Baseball. He is a graduate of Coon Rapids High School in Coon Rapids.

== Minnesota Legislature ==
Petersen was elected to the House in 2010. His legislative priorities include funding equity for schools with high needs but insufficient revenue and "value-added" teacher evaluations that measure effectiveness by student progress rather than teacher proficiency. Petersen also believes the state needs to learn to budget and make ends meet in a tougher economy just as his constituents have had to do, calling it "kitchen table budgeting."

Petersen was the chief author of legislation to link teacher evaluations to student achievement for the first time in state history. He authored legislation to cut income taxes and coauthored the 21st Century Voter ID bill and a repeal of the Legacy sales tax.

Petersen has a 90% rating from Minnesota Majority and is one of six members of the House of Representatives to receive a 100% rating from the Minnesota Chamber of Commerce in 2011. The Anoka County Watchdog has called Petersen Coon Rapids's most conservative House member ever.

On February 21, 2012, Petersen announced his intention to run in the new Senate District 35 encompassing Andover, Ramsey and Anoka. He received endorsements from North Star Tea Party Patriots Chair Walter Hudson, RNC committeewoman Pat Anderson, Rep. Peggy Scott, and Sen. Michelle Benson. He was elected to the Senate in November 2012, defeating DFLer Peter Perovich.

In 2013, he cosponsored a bill to legalize same-sex marriage in the state of Minnesota, which passed the Senate on May 13 with Petersen the only Republican voting for it. Two years earlier he voted in favor of amending the Minnesota constitution to ban same-sex marriage.

Petersen resigned from the Senate on October 31, 2015.

== Campaign finance violations ==
On July 6, 2017, the Minnesota Campaign Finance and Public Disclosure Board released its findings and orders related to violations Petersen and his campaign committed, including spending $8020 in campaign funds on private expenses, contributions accepted above legal limits, and failure to file timely reports. Petersen expressed remorse and agreed to civil penalties and repayment of funds spent or accepted in violation of the law.
