= Don Kramer (politician) =

American businessman and politician from Minnesota

Don Kramer (born December 12, 1940) was an American businessman and politician.

From Brooklyn Center, Minnesota, Kramer received a bachelor's degree from Saint John's University and a master's degree from University of North Dakota. He was a small business owner. In December 1994, he was elected to the Minnesota Senate in a special election and served there in 1996 and 1996. He was a Republican.
