= Ellen Anderson =

American politician

Ellen R. Anderson
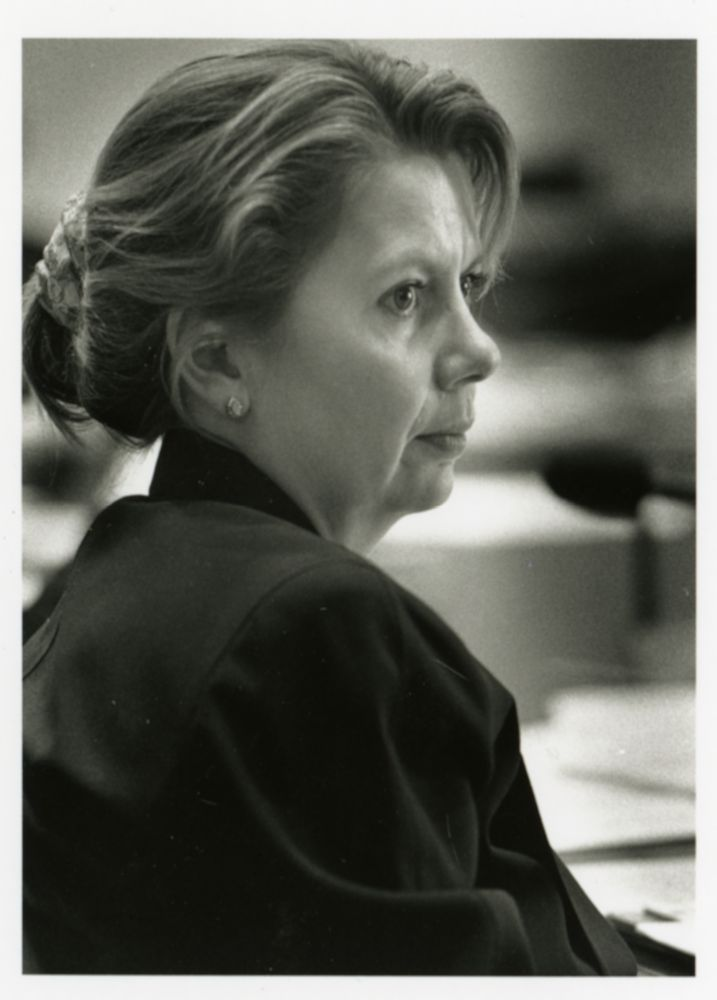
- Anderson in 1993

Chair of the Minnesota Public Utilities Commission
- In office March 20, 2011 – January 30, 2012
- Preceded by: David C. Boyd
- Succeeded by: Phyllis Reha (acting)

Member of the Minnesota Senate from the 66th district
- In office January 5, 1993 – March 20, 2011
- Preceded by: Gene Waldorf
- Succeeded by: Mary Jo McGuire

Personal details
- Born: November 25, 1959 (age 66) Gary, Indiana, U.S.
- Party: Democratic
- Spouse: Andy Dawkins (m. 1995; div. 2018)
- Education: Carleton College; University of Minnesota Law School
- Profession: Attorney, legislator

Ellen Anderson (born November 25, 1959) is a Minnesota politician, and an advisor to former Minnesota Governor Mark Dayton.

Anderson is a former member of the Minnesota Senate who represented District 66, which includes the northern portion of the city of Saint Paul, as well as the entire city of Falcon Heights in Ramsey County, which is in the Twin Cities metropolitan area. A Democrat, she was first elected in 1992, and was re-elected in 1996, 2000, 2002, 2006 and 2010.

Anderson was a member of the Senate's Energy, Utilities and Telecommunications, Finance, Higher Education, and Local Government and Elections committees. In December 2008, she was appointed by Senate Majority Leader Larry Pogemiller to the Minnesota Lessard Outdoor Heritage Council.

On March 9, 2011, Dayton announced her appointment as chair of the Minnesota Public Utilities Commission. She resigned her Senate seat effective March 20, 2011. A special election was held on April 12, 2011, to fill the vacancy. Anderson was ousted as PUC chair on January 30, 2012, when the Republican-controlled Minnesota Senate voted not to confirm her appointment. Dayton subsequently appointed her to a position as a staff advisor on energy issues.

In 1995, Anderson married Andy Dawkins, who served as a state representative from Saint Paul from 1987 to 2003. They divorced in 2018.
