= Peter P. Stumpf Jr. =

American politician (1948–2010)

Peter P. Stumpf Jr. (March 2, 1948 – December 3, 2010) was an American politician and businessman.

Stumpf was born in Saint Paul, Minnesota, and graduated from Nazareth Hall Preparatory Seminary. He received his bachelor's degree in political science and secondary education from the University of St. Thomas in 1971 and attended graduate school at the University of Minnesota in 1972. Stumpf was involved with Stumpf Realty. He served on the Ramsey County Study Commission from 1973 to 1974 and on the Minnesota Metropolitan Transit Commission in 1983 and 1984. A Democrat, Stumpf served in the Minnesota Senate from 1975 to 1982.
