= Minnesota Public Utilities Commission =

The Minnesota Public Utilities Commission (MPUC) is an independent regulatory agency within the U.S. state of Minnesota responsible for the oversight and regulation of public utilities, including electric, natural gas, and telecommunications services. Created by the Minnesota Legislature, the commission's primary mission is to ensure that residents of Minnesota have access to safe, adequate, and efficient utility services at fair, reasonable rates. It plays a significant role in balancing the needs of consumers, the environment, and utility companies.

== History ==
The MPUC traces its origins to 1871 when the Minnesota Legislature established the Office of the Railroad Commissioner to oversee railroad safety and operations. The regulatory framework underwent several changes in subsequent years, including the expansion of the board's composition and powers, eventually evolving into the Railroad and Warehouse Commissioners in 1885. This entity would serve as the predecessor to the MPUC, acquiring additional oversight duties like regulating telephone rates in 1915 and natural gas and electric utilities in 1974.

In 1967, a significant reorganization led to the creation of the Department of Public Service, which included the Public Service Commission as one of its branches. The Commission was transformed yet again in 1980 into the MPUC as an independent state agency, separating it from the Department of Public Service. This move was influenced by a Legislative Auditor's report that recommended structural changes to improve efficiency.

Today, the MPUC’s scope has been further broadened to include responsibilities like the siting and permitting of large electric generating plants and transmission lines, as defined by legislation passed in 2005.

== Responsibilities and functions ==
=== Rate setting ===
One of the MPUC's most crucial functions is the setting of rates for utility services. The commission reviews rate proposals submitted by utility companies and determines whether they are just and reasonable for both the companies and the consumers.

=== Quality assurance ===
The commission ensures that utilities meet state and federal quality standards. It evaluates the performance and reliability of utility services, ensuring that they are both safe and efficient.

=== Licensing and certification ===
Utility companies operating within the state must obtain licenses or certificates from the MPUC. The commission reviews applications and grants approvals based on various criteria, including the company's financial stability and technical capability.

=== Consumer protection ===
The MPUC provides a forum for resolving disputes between consumers and utility providers. It also disseminates information to educate consumers on their rights and responsibilities, as well as on how to conserve energy and reduce utility costs.

=== Environmental stewardship ===
Increasingly, the MPUC has a role in encouraging and regulating the use of renewable resources. It reviews and approves plans submitted by utility companies that outline how they intend to meet state environmental goals.

== Structure ==
The Minnesota Public Utilities Commission is composed of five commissioners, appointed by the Governor and confirmed by the Senate. Each commissioner serves a staggered six-year term. The commission is supported by an administrative staff and various specialized departments that assist in research, analysis, and enforcement activities.

== Regulatory framework ==
The actions and decisions of the MPUC are governed by state statutes and administrative rules. These laws outline the commission's powers and duties and provide the framework within which it operates. While the MPUC is a state agency, it also interacts with federal agencies like the Federal Energy Regulatory Commission (FERC) and adheres to federal regulations where applicable.
