= 2014 Minnesota House of Representatives election =

- November 4, 2014

All 134 seats in the Minnesota House of Representatives 68 seats needed for a majority
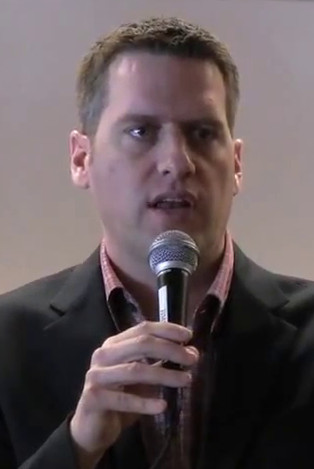

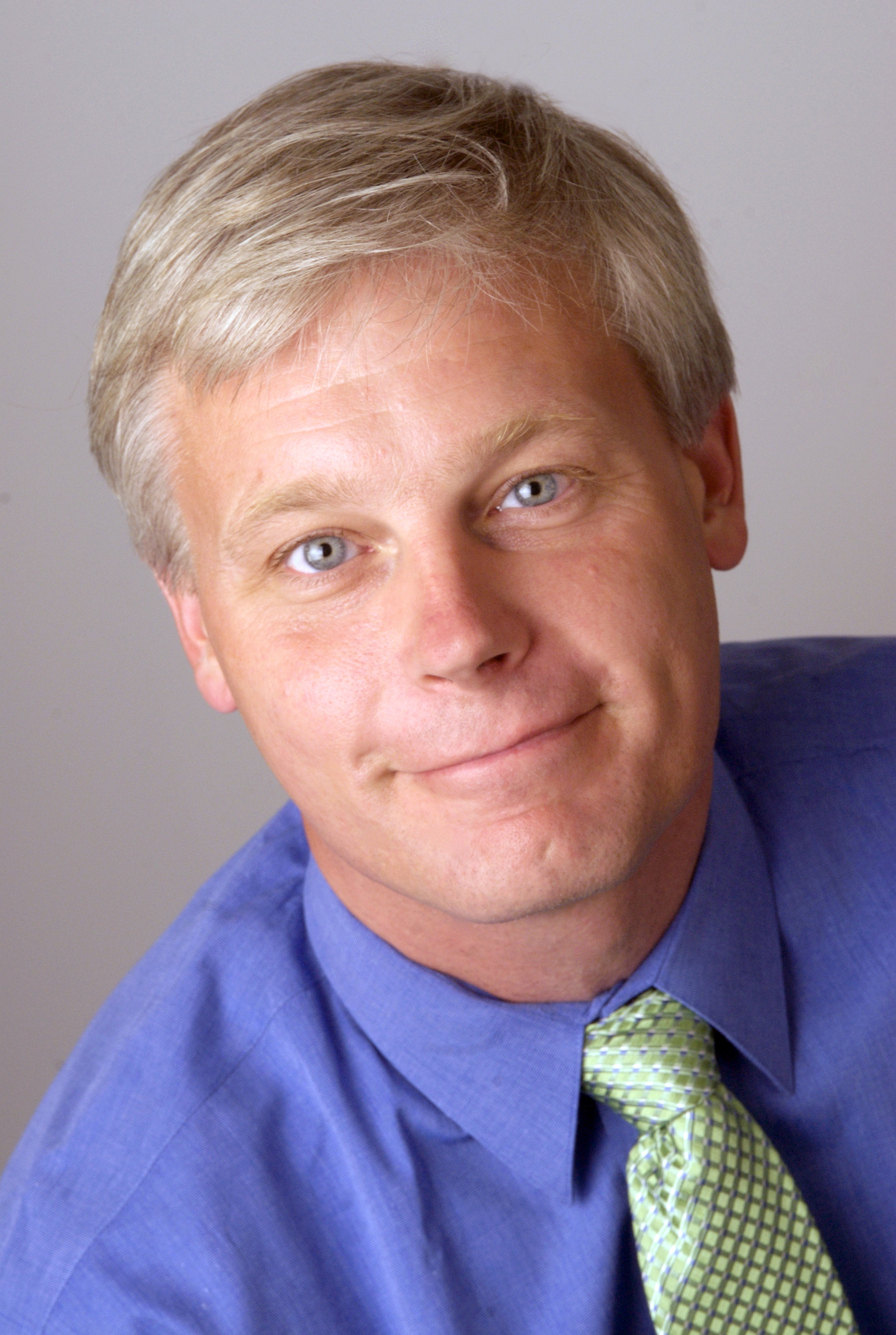
	Majority party	Minority party
Leader	Kurt Daudt	Paul Thissen
Party	Republican	Democratic (DFL)
Leader since	January 8, 2013	January 4, 2011
Leader's seat	31A–Crown	61B–Minneapolis
Last election	61 seats, 45.13%	73 seats, 53.74%
Seats won	72	62
Seat change	▲11	▼11
Popular vote	958,667	944,961
Percentage	50.01%	49.30%
Swing	▲4.88 pp	▼4.44 pp
Speaker before election
Paul Thissen
Democratic (DFL)
Elected Speaker
Kurt Daudt
Republican

The 2014 Minnesota House of Representatives election was held in the U.S. state of Minnesota on November 4, 2014, to elect members to the House of Representatives of the 89th Minnesota Legislature. A primary election was held in several districts on August 12, 2014.

The Republican Party of Minnesota won a majority of seats, defeating the majority of the Minnesota Democratic–Farmer–Labor Party (DFL). This was the first election for the DFL since it won a majority of seats in the 2012 election, after losing a majority to the Republicans in the 2010 election. The new Legislature convened on January 6, 2015.

== Retiring members ==
=== DFL ===
- John Benson, 44B
- Kathy Brynaert, 19B
- Tom Huntley, 7A
- Michael Paymar, 64B
- Steve Simon, 46B

=== Republican ===
- Jim Abeler, 35A
- Mike Beard, 55A
- Mike Benson, 26B
- David FitzSimmons, 30B
- Mary Liz Holberg, 58A
- Andrea Kieffer, 53B
- Ernie Leidiger, 47A
- Pam Myhra, 56A
- Kelby Woodard, 20A
- Kurt Zellers, 34B

== Predictions ==
Source	Ranking	As of
Governing	Lean D	October 20, 2014

=== Competitive districts ===
According to an analysis by the Star Tribune, based on past election results, fundraising, and other factors, 16 seats were vulnerable to switching parties. 14 were held by the DFL and two by the Republicans. According to MinnPost, 15 seats had the best chance of switching parties, based on the district's political lean (as calculated by MinnPost), previous election results, and the strength of the respective candidates. 13 were held by the DFL and two by the Republicans.

District	Incumbent	Party	Star Tribune (September 7, 2014)	MinnPost (October 28, 2014)	Result
1B	Deb Kiel	Republican	Yes	Yes	Hold
2A	Roger Erickson	DFL	Yes	Yes	Republican gain
2B	Steve Green	Republican	No	Yes	Hold
4A	Ben Lien	DFL	Yes	No	Hold
10B	Joe Radinovich	DFL	Yes	Yes	Republican gain
11B	Tim Faust	DFL	Yes	Yes	Republican gain
12A	Jay McNamar	DFL	Yes	Yes	Republican gain
14B	Zach Dorholt	DFL	Yes	Yes	Republican gain
17A	Andrew Falk	DFL	No	Yes	Republican gain
17B	Mary Sawatzky	DFL	Yes	Yes	Republican gain
27A	Shannon Savick	DFL	Yes	Yes	Republican gain
36A	Mark Uglem	Republican	Yes	No	Hold
48A	Yvonne Selcer	DFL	Yes	Yes	Hold
49A	Ron Erhardt	DFL	Yes	No	Hold
49B	Paul Rosenthal	DFL	Yes	Yes	Hold
51A	Sandra Masin	DFL	Yes	Yes	Hold
51B	Laurie Halverson	DFL	Yes	Yes	Hold
56B	Will Morgan	DFL	Yes	Yes	Republican gain

== Primary election results ==
District	Party	Candidates	Votes	%
5A	Republican	Phillip Nelson	1,289	100.00
5A	DFL	John Persell	1,544	84.60
5A	DFL	Lavern Pederson	281	15.40
6A	Republican	Roger Weber	977	100.00
6A	DFL	Carly Melin	2,979	80.04
6A	DFL	John Finken	743	19.96
7B	Republican	Travis Silvers	371	57.43
7B	Republican	Carla Bayerl	275	42.57
7B	DFL	Erik Simonson	1,601	100.00
12A	Republican	Jeff Backer	1,777	55.55
12A	Republican	Nancy Taffe	1,422	44.45
12A	DFL	Jay McNamar	1,512	100.00
30B	Republican	Eric Lucero	1,363	63.99
30B	Republican	Kevin Kasel	767	36.01
30B	DFL	Sharon Shimek	361	100.00
35A	Republican	Abigail Whelan	1,794	80.70
35A	Republican	Justin Boals	429	19.30
35A	DFL	Peter Perovich	781	100.00
44B	Republican	Ryan Rutzick	1,393	100.00
44B	DFL	Jon Applebaum	1,053	37.58
44B	DFL	Tony Wagner	1,016	36.26
44B	DFL	Jon Tollefson	733	26.16
47A	Republican	Jim Nash	1,406	59.93
47A	Republican	Bob Frey	940	40.07
47A	DFL	Matthew Gieseke	474	100.00
48B	Republican	Jenifer Loon	1,925	60.63
48B	Republican	Sheila Kihne	1,250	39.37
48B	DFL	Joan Howe-Pullis	671	100.00
51A	Republican	Andrea Todd-Harlin	891	55.90
51A	Republican	Victor Lake	703	44.10
51A	DFL	Sandra Masin	970	100.00
55A	Independence	Derek Thury	21	100.00
55A	Republican	Bob Loonan	721	50.60
55A	Republican	Bruce Mackenthun	704	49.40
55A	DFL	Jay Whiting	512	82.85
55A	DFL	Ronald Gray	106	17.15
60B	Republican	Abdimalik Askar	91	81.25
60B	Republican	Abdulkarim Godah	21	18.75
60B	DFL	Phyllis Kahn	2,332	54.47
60B	DFL	Mohamud Noor	1,949	45.53
63B	Republican	Andres Hortillosa	543	100.00
63B	DFL	Jean Wagenius	2,166	91.08
63B	DFL	Roger Kittelson	212	8.92

Source: Minnesota Secretary of State

== General election ==
=== Opinion polling ===
Polling firm/client	Polling period	Sample size	Margin of error	DFL	Republican	Other	Undecided
SurveyUSA/KSTP-TV	October 27–30, 2014	596 LV	± 4.1%	44%	43%	5%	7%
SurveyUSA/KSTP-TV	October 14–16, 2014	597 LV	± 4.1%	46%	42%	5%	6%
SurveyUSA/KSTP-TV	September 30 – October 2, 2014	577 LV	± 4.2%	46%	42%	5%	7%
SurveyUSA/KSTP-TV	August 19–21, 2014	600 LV	± 4.1%	43%	45%	5%	8%
Public Policy Polling	June 12–15, 2014	633 RV	± 3.9%	46%	41%	—	14%
SurveyUSA/KSTP-TV	June 5–9, 2014	1017 LV	± 3.1%	42%	45%	5%	8%
Public Policy Polling	May 17–19, 2013	712	± 3.7%	47%	41%	—	12%

=== Results ===
Districts won

Summary of the November 4, 2014 Minnesota House of Representatives election results
Party	Candidates	Votes			Seats		
Party	Candidates	No.	%	∆pp	No.	∆No.	%
Republican Party of Minnesota	133	958,667	50.01	▲4.88	72	▲11	53.73
Minnesota Democratic–Farmer–Labor Party	126	944,961	49.30	▼4.44	62	▼11	46.27
Independence Party of Minnesota	4	2,846	0.15	▼0.35	0	Steady	0.00
Green Party of Minnesota	2	2,001	0.10	▲0.10	0	Steady	0.00
Constitution Party of Minnesota	1	1,924	0.10	▼0.03	0	Steady	0.00
Write-in	N/A	6,455	0.34	▼0.02	0	Steady	0.00
Total		1,916,854	100.00	±0.00	134	±0	100.00
Invalid/blank votes		75,712	3.80	▼3.60			
Turnout (out of 3,945,136 eligible voters)		1,992,566	50.51	▼25.91			
Source: Minnesota Secretary of State, Minnesota Legislative Reference Library

=== District results ===
District	Incumbent			Candidates				
District	Name	Party	First elected	Name	Party	Votes	%	Winner Party
1A	Dan Fabian	Republican	2010	Dan Fabian	Republican	9,942	67.09	Republican
1A	Dan Fabian	Republican	2010	Bruce Patterson	DFL	4,864	32.82	Republican
1B	Deb Kiel	Republican	2010	Deb Kiel	Republican	7,176	55.61	Republican
1B	Deb Kiel	Republican	2010	Eric Bergeson	DFL	5,721	44.34	Republican
2A	Roger Erickson	DFL	2012	Dave Hancock	Republican	7,839	52.36	Republican
2A	Roger Erickson	DFL	2012	Roger Erickson	DFL	7,109	47.49	Republican
2B	Steve Green	Republican	2012	Steve Green	Republican	8,335	57.16	Republican
2B	Steve Green	Republican	2012	David Sobieski	DFL	6,236	42.77	Republican
3A	David Dill	DFL	2002	David Dill	DFL	12,067	65.55	DFL
3A	David Dill	DFL	2002	Eric Johnson	Republican	6,297	34.21	DFL
3B	Mary Murphy	DFL	1976	Mary Murphy	DFL	9,956	62.16	DFL
3B	Mary Murphy	DFL	1976	Wade Flemling	Republican	6,041	37.72	DFL
4A	Ben Lien	DFL	2012	Ben Lien	DFL	6,713	58.34	DFL
4A	Ben Lien	DFL	2012	Brian Gramer	Republican	4,772	41.47	DFL
4B	Paul Marquart	DFL	2000	Paul Marquart	DFL	9,135	65.84	DFL
4B	Paul Marquart	DFL	2000	Jared LaDuke	Republican	4,734	34.12	DFL
5A	John Persell	DFL	2008	John Persell	DFL	7,871	55.16	DFL
5A	John Persell	DFL	2008	Phillip Nelson	Republican	6,385	44.74	DFL
5B	Tom Anzelc	DFL	2006	Tom Anzelc	DFL	9,449	56.54	DFL
5B	Tom Anzelc	DFL	2006	Justin Eichorn	Republican	7,241	43.33	DFL
6A	Carly Melin	DFL	2011*	Carly Melin	DFL	11,257	69.38	DFL
6A	Carly Melin	DFL	2011*	Roger Weber	Republican	4,930	30.39	DFL
6B	Jason Metsa	DFL	2012	Jason Metsa	DFL	11,363	64.11	DFL
6B	Jason Metsa	DFL	2012	Matt Matasich	Republican	6,334	35.73	DFL
7A	Tom Huntley‡	DFL	1992	Jennifer Schultz	DFL	9,658	62.11	DFL
7A	Tom Huntley‡	DFL	1992	Becky Hall	Republican	5,175	33.28	DFL
7A	Tom Huntley‡	DFL	1992	Kristine Osbakken	Green	693	4.46	DFL
7B	Erik Simonson	DFL	2012	Erik Simonson	DFL	9,435	71.05	DFL
7B	Erik Simonson	DFL	2012	Travis Silvers	Republican	3,803	28.64	DFL
8A	Bud Nornes	Republican	1996	Bud Nornes	Republican	9,739	64.69	Republican
8A	Bud Nornes	Republican	1996	Jim Miltich	DFL	5,303	35.22	Republican
8B	Mary Franson	Republican	2010	Mary Franson	Republican	9,270	58.41	Republican
8B	Mary Franson	Republican	2010	Jay Sieling	DFL	6,565	41.36	Republican
9A	Mark Anderson	Republican	2012	Mark Anderson	Republican	9,336	63.89	Republican
9A	Mark Anderson	Republican	2012	Dan Bye	DFL	5,263	36.02	Republican
9B	Ron Kresha	Republican	2012	Ron Kresha	Republican	8,449	56.42	Republican
9B	Ron Kresha	Republican	2012	Al Doty	DFL	6,518	43.53	Republican
10A	John Ward	DFL	2006	Josh Heintzeman	Republican	8,646	53.37	Republican
10A	John Ward	DFL	2006	John Ward	DFL	7,539	46.54	Republican
10B	Joe Radinovich	DFL	2012	Dale Lueck	Republican	9,209	51.86	Republican
10B	Joe Radinovich	DFL	2012	Joe Radinovich	DFL	8,523	48.00	Republican
11A	Mike Sundin	DFL	2012	Mike Sundin	DFL	9,493	62.35	DFL
11A	Mike Sundin	DFL	2012	Tim Hafvenstein	Republican	5,717	37.55	DFL
11B	Tim Faust	DFL	2006, 2012†	Jason Rarick	Republican	7,545	53.67	Republican
11B	Tim Faust	DFL	2006, 2012†	Tim Faust	DFL	6,488	46.15	Republican
12A	Jay McNamar	DFL	2012	Jeff Backer	Republican	8,725	51.85	Republican
12A	Jay McNamar	DFL	2012	Jay McNamar	DFL	8,065	47.93	Republican
12B	Paul Anderson	Republican	2008	Paul Anderson	Republican	9,920	67.84	Republican
12B	Paul Anderson	Republican	2008	Gordy Wagner	DFL	4,694	32.10	Republican
13A	Jeff Howe	Republican	2012	Jeff Howe	Republican	8,562	60.51	Republican
13A	Jeff Howe	Republican	2012	Emily Jensen	DFL	5,572	39.38	Republican
13B	Tim O'Driscoll	Republican	2010	Tim O'Driscoll	Republican	11,284	97.48	Republican
14A	Tama Theis	Republican	2013*	Tama Theis	Republican	7,292	54.90	Republican
14A	Tama Theis	Republican	2013*	Dan Wolgamott	DFL	5,972	44.96	Republican
14B	Zach Dorholt	DFL	2012	Jim Knoblach	Republican	5,674	50.15	Republican
14B	Zach Dorholt	DFL	2012	Zach Dorholt	DFL	5,605	49.54	Republican
15A	Sondra Erickson	Republican	1998*, 2010†	Sondra Erickson	Republican	8,348	63.01	Republican
15A	Sondra Erickson	Republican	1998*, 2010†	Jim Rittenour	DFL	4,876	36.80	Republican
15B	Jim Newberger	Republican	2012	Jim Newberger	Republican	9,166	63.93	Republican
15B	Jim Newberger	Republican	2012	Brian Johnson	DFL	5,154	35.95	Republican
16A	Chris Swedzinski	Republican	2010	Chris Swedzinski	Republican	8,642	61.72	Republican
16A	Chris Swedzinski	Republican	2010	Laurie Driessen	DFL	5,355	38.24	Republican
16B	Paul Torkelson	Republican	2008	Paul Torkelson	Republican	9,053	64.94	Republican
16B	Paul Torkelson	Republican	2008	James Kanne	DFL	4,872	34.95	Republican
17A	Andrew Falk	DFL	2008	Tim Miller	Republican	8,453	55.37	Republican
17A	Andrew Falk	DFL	2008	Andrew Falk	DFL	6,789	44.47	Republican
17B	Mary Sawatzky	DFL	2012	Dave Baker	Republican	7,807	50.66	Republican
17B	Mary Sawatzky	DFL	2012	Mary Sawatzky	DFL	7,593	49.27	Republican
18A	Dean Urdahl	Republican	2002	Dean Urdahl	Republican	9,965	67.22	Republican
18A	Dean Urdahl	Republican	2002	Steven Schiroo	DFL	4,808	32.43	Republican
18B	Glenn Gruenhagen	Republican	2010	Glenn Gruenhagen	Republican	8,801	63.94	Republican
18B	Glenn Gruenhagen	Republican	2010	John Lipke	DFL	4,939	35.88	Republican
19A	Clark Johnson	DFL	2013*	Clark Johnson	DFL	7,458	54.08	DFL
19A	Clark Johnson	DFL	2013*	Kim Spears	Republican	6,313	45.78	DFL
19B	Kathy Brynaert‡	DFL	2006	Jack Considine	DFL	6,258	55.96	DFL
19B	Kathy Brynaert‡	DFL	2006	David Kruse	Republican	4,905	43.87	DFL
20A	Kelby Woodard‡	Republican	2010	Bob Vogel	Republican	8,836	64.29	Republican
20A	Kelby Woodard‡	Republican	2010	Thomas Lofgren	DFL	4,881	35.52	Republican
20B	David Bly	DFL	2006, 2012†	David Bly	DFL	8,300	57.97	DFL
20B	David Bly	DFL	2006, 2012†	Dan Matejcek	Republican	5,985	41.80	DFL
21A	Tim Kelly	Republican	2008	Tim Kelly	Republican	9,204	62.17	Republican
21A	Tim Kelly	Republican	2008	Lynn Schoen	DFL	5,593	37.78	Republican
21B	Steve Drazkowski	Republican	2007*	Steve Drazkowski	Republican	9,075	63.33	Republican
21B	Steve Drazkowski	Republican	2007*	M.A. Schneider	DFL	5,213	36.38	Republican
22A	Joe Schomacker	Republican	2010	Joe Schomacker	Republican	9,779	66.71	Republican
22A	Joe Schomacker	Republican	2010	Diane Slyter	DFL	4,868	33.21	Republican
22B	Rod Hamilton	Republican	2004	Rod Hamilton	Republican	8,243	66.19	Republican
22B	Rod Hamilton	Republican	2004	Cheryl Avenel-Navara	DFL	4,200	33.72	Republican
23A	Bob Gunther	Republican	1995*	Bob Gunther	Republican	9,232	61.66	Republican
23A	Bob Gunther	Republican	1995*	Pat Bacon	DFL	5,735	38.30	Republican
23B	Tony Cornish	Republican	2002	Tony Cornish	Republican	11,339	96.11	Republican
24A	John Petersburg	Republican	2012	John Petersburg	Republican	7,202	54.73	Republican
24A	John Petersburg	Republican	2012	Beverly Cashman	DFL	5,949	45.21	Republican
24B	Patti Fritz	DFL	2004	Brian Daniels	Republican	6,163	50.85	Republican
24B	Patti Fritz	DFL	2004	Patti Fritz	DFL	5,942	49.02	Republican
25A	Duane Quam	Republican	2010	Duane Quam	Republican	10,970	96.24	Republican
25B	Kim Norton	DFL	2006	Kim Norton	DFL	9,844	94.91	DFL
26A	Tina Liebling	DFL	2004	Tina Liebling	DFL	6,244	55.23	DFL
26A	Tina Liebling	DFL	2004	Breanna Bly	Republican	5,050	44.67	DFL
26B	Mike Benson‡	Republican	2010	Nels Pierson	Republican	9,251	59.85	Republican
26B	Mike Benson‡	Republican	2010	Richard Wright	DFL	6,188	40.03	Republican
27A	Shannon Savick	DFL	2012	Peggy Bennett	Republican	8,155	53.04	Republican
27A	Shannon Savick	DFL	2012	Shannon Savick	DFL	6,139	39.93	Republican
27A	Shannon Savick	DFL	2012	Thomas Price	Independence	1,066	6.93	Republican
27B	Jeanne Poppe	DFL	2004	Jeanne Poppe	DFL	6,498	54.10	DFL
27B	Jeanne Poppe	DFL	2004	Dennis Schminke	Republican	5,501	45.80	DFL
28A	Gene Pelowski	DFL	1986	Gene Pelowski	DFL	7,279	62.70	DFL
28A	Gene Pelowski	DFL	1986	Lynae Hahn	Republican	4,307	37.10	DFL
28B	Greg Davids	Republican	1991*, 2008†	Greg Davids	Republican	9,013	55.88	Republican
28B	Greg Davids	Republican	1991*, 2008†	Jon Pieper	DFL	7,090	43.96	Republican
29A	Joe McDonald	Republican	2010	Joe McDonald	Republican	11,839	96.80	Republican
29B	Marion O'Neill	Republican	2012	Marion O'Neill	Republican	10,196	96.77	Republican
30A	Nick Zerwas	Republican	2012	Nick Zerwas	Republican	9,349	68.51	Republican
30A	Nick Zerwas	Republican	2012	Brenden Ellingboe	DFL	4,279	31.35	Republican
30B	David FitzSimmons‡	Republican	2012	Eric Lucero	Republican	9,005	67.75	Republican
30B	David FitzSimmons‡	Republican	2012	Sharon Shimek	DFL	4,256	32.02	Republican
31A	Kurt Daudt	Republican	2010	Kurt Daudt	Republican	10,363	96.67	Republican
31B	Tom Hackbarth	Republican	1994, 1998†	Tom Hackbarth	Republican	9,726	64.47	Republican
31B	Tom Hackbarth	Republican	1994, 1998†	JD Holmquist	DFL	5,339	35.39	Republican
32A	Brian Johnson	Republican	2012	Brian Johnson	Republican	8,006	57.48	Republican
32A	Brian Johnson	Republican	2012	Paul Gammel	DFL	5,907	42.41	Republican
32B	Bob Barrett	Republican	2010	Bob Barrett	Republican	8,459	55.73	Republican
32B	Bob Barrett	Republican	2010	Laurie Warner	DFL	6,707	44.19	Republican
33A	Jerry Hertaus	Republican	2012	Jerry Hertaus	Republican	12,003	65.70	Republican
33A	Jerry Hertaus	Republican	2012	Todd Mikkelson	DFL	6,246	34.19	Republican
33B	Cindy Pugh	Republican	2012	Cindy Pugh	Republican	10,934	61.22	Republican
33B	Cindy Pugh	Republican	2012	Paul Alegi	DFL	6,911	38.69	Republican
34A	Joyce Peppin	Republican	2004	Joyce Peppin	Republican	12,411	97.05	Republican
34B	Kurt Zellers‡	Republican	2003*	Dennis Smith	Republican	9,016	56.36	Republican
34B	Kurt Zellers‡	Republican	2003*	David Hoden	DFL	6,965	43.54	Republican
35A	Jim Abeler‡	Republican	1998	Abigail Whelan	Republican	7,808	59.95	Republican
35A	Jim Abeler‡	Republican	1998	Peter Perovich	DFL	5,192	39.86	Republican
35B	Peggy Scott	Republican	2008	Peggy Scott	Republican	10,034	65.97	Republican
35B	Peggy Scott	Republican	2008	Sam Beard	DFL	5,162	33.94	Republican
36A	Mark Uglem	Republican	2012	Mark Uglem	Republican	8,080	58.95	Republican
36A	Mark Uglem	Republican	2012	Jefferson Fietek	DFL	5,608	40.92	Republican
36B	Melissa Hortman	DFL	2004	Melissa Hortman	DFL	7,407	51.90	DFL
36B	Melissa Hortman	DFL	2004	Peter Crema	Republican	6,851	48.00	DFL
37A	Jerry Newton	DFL	2008, 2012†	Jerry Newton	DFL	6,934	52.45	DFL
37A	Jerry Newton	DFL	2008, 2012†	Mandy Benz	Republican	6,275	47.46	DFL
37B	Tim Sanders	Republican	2008	Tim Sanders	Republican	7,602	55.40	Republican
37B	Tim Sanders	Republican	2008	Susan Witt	DFL	6,111	44.54	Republican
38A	Linda Runbeck	Republican	1989*, 2010†	Linda Runbeck	Republican	9,213	62.19	Republican
38A	Linda Runbeck	Republican	1989*, 2010†	Patrick Davern	DFL	5,586	37.71	Republican
38B	Matt Dean	Republican	2004	Matt Dean	Republican	9,529	56.07	Republican
38B	Matt Dean	Republican	2004	Greg Pariseau	DFL	7,444	43.80	Republican
39A	Bob Dettmer	Republican	2006	Bob Dettmer	Republican	9,730	58.02	Republican
39A	Bob Dettmer	Republican	2006	Tim Stender	DFL	7,028	41.91	Republican
39B	Kathy Lohmer	Republican	2010	Kathy Lohmer	Republican	9,531	54.56	Republican
39B	Kathy Lohmer	Republican	2010	Tom DeGree	DFL	7,926	45.37	Republican
40A	Mike Nelson	DFL	2002	Mike Nelson	DFL	5,711	64.85	DFL
40A	Mike Nelson	DFL	2002	Chuck Sutphen	Republican	3,077	34.94	DFL
40B	Debra Hilstrom	DFL	2000	Debra Hilstrom	DFL	6,778	67.36	DFL
40B	Debra Hilstrom	DFL	2000	Mali Marvin	Republican	3,265	32.45	DFL
41A	Connie Bernardy	DFL	2000, 2012†	Connie Bernardy	DFL	8,265	60.16	DFL
41A	Connie Bernardy	DFL	2000, 2012†	Jeff Phillips	Republican	5,451	39.68	DFL
41B	Carolyn Laine	DFL	2006	Carolyn Laine	DFL	8,322	57.38	DFL
41B	Carolyn Laine	DFL	2006	Camden Pike	Republican	4,248	29.29	DFL
41B	Carolyn Laine	DFL	2006	Tim Utz	Constitution	1,924	13.27	DFL
42A	Barb Yarusso	DFL	2012	Barb Yarusso	DFL	8,766	50.55	DFL
42A	Barb Yarusso	DFL	2012	Randy Jessup	Republican	8,546	49.28	DFL
42B	Jason Isaacson	DFL	2012	Jason Isaacson	DFL	8,814	52.30	DFL
42B	Jason Isaacson	DFL	2012	Heidi Gunderson	Republican	8,014	47.55	DFL
43A	Peter Fischer	DFL	2012	Peter Fischer	DFL	8,314	50.64	DFL
43A	Peter Fischer	DFL	2012	Stacey Stout	Republican	8,068	49.14	DFL
43B	Leon Lillie	DFL	2004	Leon Lillie	DFL	7,891	58.08	DFL
43B	Leon Lillie	DFL	2004	Justice Whitethorn	Republican	5,672	41.75	DFL
44A	Sarah Anderson	Republican	2006	Sarah Anderson	Republican	9,377	55.51	Republican
44A	Sarah Anderson	Republican	2006	Audrey Britton	DFL	7,504	44.43	Republican
44B	John Benson‡	DFL	2006	Jon Applebaum	DFL	9,507	51.30	DFL
44B	John Benson‡	DFL	2006	Ryan Rutzick	Republican	8,981	48.46	DFL
45A	Lyndon Carlson	DFL	1972	Lyndon Carlson	DFL	7,988	56.52	DFL
45A	Lyndon Carlson	DFL	1972	Richard Lieberman	Republican	6,117	43.28	DFL
45B	Mike Freiberg	DFL	2012	Mike Freiberg	DFL	10,750	66.94	DFL
45B	Mike Freiberg	DFL	2012	Alma Wetzker	Republican	5,281	32.89	DFL
46A	Ryan Winkler	DFL	2006	Ryan Winkler	DFL	10,666	66.17	DFL
46A	Ryan Winkler	DFL	2006	Timothy Manthey	Republican	5,425	33.66	DFL
46B	Steve Simon‡	DFL	2004	Cheryl Youakim	DFL	9,525	68.50	DFL
46B	Steve Simon‡	DFL	2004	Bryan Bjornson	Republican	4,353	31.30	DFL
47A	Ernie Leidiger‡	Republican	2010	Jim Nash	Republican	10,934	67.63	Republican
47A	Ernie Leidiger‡	Republican	2010	Matthew Gieseke	DFL	5,186	32.08	Republican
47B	Joe Hoppe	Republican	2002	Joe Hoppe	Republican	11,340	97.18	Republican
48A	Yvonne Selcer	DFL	2012	Yvonne Selcer	DFL	9,606	50.04	DFL
48A	Yvonne Selcer	DFL	2012	Kirk Stensrud	Republican	9,565	49.83	DFL
48B	Jenifer Loon	Republican	2008	Jenifer Loon	Republican	10,294	64.42	Republican
48B	Jenifer Loon	Republican	2008	Joan Howe-Pullis	DFL	5,661	35.43	Republican
49A	Ron Erhardt	DFL	1990, 2012†	Ron Erhardt	DFL	10,206	51.38	DFL
49A	Ron Erhardt	DFL	1990, 2012†	Dario Anselmo	Republican	9,645	48.55	DFL
49B	Paul Rosenthal	DFL	2008, 2012†	Paul Rosenthal	DFL	10,171	52.80	DFL
49B	Paul Rosenthal	DFL	2008, 2012†	Barb Sutter	Republican	9,075	47.11	DFL
50A	Linda Slocum	DFL	2006	Linda Slocum	DFL	8,260	64.72	DFL
50A	Linda Slocum	DFL	2006	Dean Mumbleau	Republican	4,481	35.11	DFL
50B	Ann Lenczewski	DFL	1998	Ann Lenczewski	DFL	10,060	65.60	DFL
50B	Ann Lenczewski	DFL	1998	Zavier Bicott	Republican	5,251	34.24	DFL
51A	Sandra Masin	DFL	2006, 2012†	Sandra Masin	DFL	7,262	51.47	DFL
51A	Sandra Masin	DFL	2006, 2012†	Andrea Todd-Harlin	Republican	6,821	48.34	DFL
51B	Laurie Halverson	DFL	2012	Laurie Halverson	DFL	8,757	51.09	DFL
51B	Laurie Halverson	DFL	2012	Jen Wilson	Republican	8,366	48.80	DFL
52A	Rick Hansen	DFL	2004	Rick Hansen	DFL	9,777	59.38	DFL
52A	Rick Hansen	DFL	2004	Joe Blum	Republican	6,661	40.46	DFL
52B	Joe Atkins	DFL	2002	Joe Atkins	DFL	9,831	64.47	DFL
52B	Joe Atkins	DFL	2002	Don Lee	Republican	5,405	35.45	DFL
53A	JoAnn Ward	DFL	2012	JoAnn Ward	DFL	8,420	58.36	DFL
53A	JoAnn Ward	DFL	2012	Lukas Czech	Republican	5,983	41.47	DFL
53B	Andrea Kieffer‡	Republican	2010	Kelly Fenton	Republican	8,634	56.93	Republican
53B	Andrea Kieffer‡	Republican	2010	Kay Hendrickson	DFL	6,515	42.96	Republican
54A	Dan Schoen	DFL	2012	Dan Schoen	DFL	7,047	55.52	DFL
54A	Dan Schoen	DFL	2012	Matthew Kowalski	Republican	5,629	44.35	DFL
54B	Denny McNamara	Republican	2002	Denny McNamara	Republican	8,853	60.54	Republican
54B	Denny McNamara	Republican	2002	Donald Slaten	DFL	5,750	39.32	Republican
55A	Mike Beard‡	Republican	2002	Bob Loonan	Republican	6,439	56.75	Republican
55A	Mike Beard‡	Republican	2002	Jay Whiting	DFL	4,398	38.76	Republican
55A	Mike Beard‡	Republican	2002	Derek Thury	Independence	500	4.41	Republican
55B	Tony Albright	Republican	2012	Tony Albright	Republican	9,278	61.00	Republican
55B	Tony Albright	Republican	2012	Kevin Burkart	DFL	5,422	35.65	Republican
55B	Tony Albright	Republican	2012	Josh Ondich	Independence	507	3.33	Republican
56A	Pam Myhra‡	Republican	2010	Drew Christensen	Republican	7,498	55.81	Republican
56A	Pam Myhra‡	Republican	2010	Dan Kimmel	DFL	5,913	44.01	Republican
56B	Will Morgan	DFL	2006, 2012†	Roz Peterson	Republican	7,856	53.99	Republican
56B	Will Morgan	DFL	2006, 2012†	Will Morgan	DFL	6,669	45.83	Republican
57A	Tara Mack	Republican	2008	Tara Mack	Republican	8,347	58.44	Republican
57A	Tara Mack	Republican	2008	Bruce Folken	DFL	5,931	41.52	Republican
57B	Anna Wills	Republican	2012	Anna Wills	Republican	9,083	58.40	Republican
57B	Anna Wills	Republican	2012	Denise Packard	DFL	6,458	41.53	Republican
58A	Mary Liz Holberg‡	Republican	1998	Jon Koznick	Republican	8,021	55.28	Republican
58A	Mary Liz Holberg‡	Republican	1998	Amy Willingham	DFL	6,476	44.63	Republican
58B	Pat Garofalo	Republican	2004	Pat Garofalo	Republican	8,878	63.85	Republican
58B	Pat Garofalo	Republican	2004	Marla Vagts	DFL	5,008	36.02	Republican
59A	Joe Mullery	DFL	1996	Joe Mullery	DFL	7,358	81.98	DFL
59A	Joe Mullery	DFL	1996	Fred Statema	Republican	1,547	17.24	DFL
59B	Raymond Dehn	DFL	2012	Raymond Dehn	DFL	8,671	78.10	DFL
59B	Raymond Dehn	DFL	2012	Margaret Martin	Republican	2,378	21.42	DFL
60A	Diane Loeffler	DFL	2004	Diane Loeffler	DFL	11,819	82.42	DFL
60A	Diane Loeffler	DFL	2004	Brent Millsop	Republican	2,472	17.24	DFL
60B	Phyllis Kahn	DFL	1972	Phyllis Kahn	DFL	7,908	76.89	DFL
60B	Phyllis Kahn	DFL	1972	Abdimalik Askar	Republican	2,298	22.34	DFL
61A	Frank Hornstein	DFL	2002	Frank Hornstein	DFL	14,239	80.79	DFL
61A	Frank Hornstein	DFL	2002	Frank Taylor	Republican	3,341	18.96	DFL
61B	Paul Thissen	DFL	2002	Paul Thissen	DFL	14,740	80.94	DFL
61B	Paul Thissen	DFL	2002	Tom Gallagher	Republican	3,445	18.92	DFL
62A	Karen Clark	DFL	1980	Karen Clark	DFL	6,632	82.13	DFL
62A	Karen Clark	DFL	1980	Yolandita Colon	Independence	773	9.57	DFL
62A	Karen Clark	DFL	1980	Bruce Lundeen	Republican	650	8.05	DFL
62B	Susan Allen	DFL	2012*	Susan Allen	DFL	11,495	88.66	DFL
62B	Susan Allen	DFL	2012*	Julie Hanson	Republican	1,417	10.93	DFL
63A	Jim Davnie	DFL	2000	Jim Davnie	DFL	15,026	86.44	DFL
63A	Jim Davnie	DFL	2000	Kyle Bragg	Republican	2,297	13.21	DFL
63B	Jean Wagenius	DFL	1986	Jean Wagenius	DFL	12,447	75.06	DFL
63B	Jean Wagenius	DFL	1986	Andres Hortillosa	Republican	4,086	24.64	DFL
64A	Erin Murphy	DFL	2006	Erin Murphy	DFL	13,193	81.21	DFL
64A	Erin Murphy	DFL	2006	Andrew Brown	Republican	3,009	18.52	DFL
64B	Michael Paymar‡	DFL	1996	Dave Pinto	DFL	13,356	73.49	DFL
64B	Michael Paymar‡	DFL	1996	Daniel Surman	Republican	4,771	26.25	DFL
65A	Rena Moran	DFL	2010	Rena Moran	DFL	6,626	71.20	DFL
65A	Rena Moran	DFL	2010	Anthony Meschke	Republican	1,358	14.59	DFL
65A	Rena Moran	DFL	2010	Lena Buggs	Green	1,308	14.06	DFL
65B	Carlos Mariani	DFL	1990	Carlos Mariani	DFL	8,590	77.54	DFL
65B	Carlos Mariani	DFL	1990	Tony Athen	Republican	2,427	21.91	DFL
66A	Alice Hausman	DFL	1989*	Alice Hausman	DFL	11,100	67.09	DFL
66A	Alice Hausman	DFL	1989*	Jon Heyer	Republican	5,421	32.76	DFL
66B	John Lesch	DFL	2002	John Lesch	DFL	7,047	76.41	DFL
66B	John Lesch	DFL	2002	Lizz Paulson	Republican	2,127	23.06	DFL
67A	Tim Mahoney	DFL	1998	Tim Mahoney	DFL	5,400	72.43	DFL
67A	Tim Mahoney	DFL	1998	Andrew Livingston	Republican	2,032	27.26	DFL
67B	Sheldon Johnson	DFL	2000	Sheldon Johnson	DFL	6,222	72.82	DFL
67B	Sheldon Johnson	DFL	2000	John Quinn	Republican	2,289	26.79	DFL

*Elected in a special election.
†Elected to non-consecutive terms.
‡Retiring; not seeking re-election.

Withdrawn candidates

The following sought election but later withdrew and did not file an affidavit of candidacy.

District	Candidates	Party
7A	Gary Anderson	DFL
7A	Donna Bergstrom	Republican
7A	Pete Johnson	DFL
7A	Linda Krug	DFL
8B	Sue Nelson	Republican
11A	James Hamilton	Republican
14B	Paul Brandmire	Republican
17A	Gary Nelson	Republican
19B	Karen Foreman	DFL
20A	Cary Coop	DFL
20A	Benjamin Rohloff	Republican
24A	Craig Brenden	DFL
24B	Deb Salonek	Libertarian
27A	Milan Hart	Republican
31A	Mark Korin	Republican
34B	Dean Henke	Republican
35A	Don Huizenga	Republican
35A	Jason Tossey	Republican
37A	Chris Stolarzyk	Republican
42B	Michelle Manke	Republican
46B	Eric Margolis	DFL
47A	Keith Pickering	DFL
49A	Polly Peterson Bowles	Republican
64B	Matthew Bergeron	DFL
64B	Greta Bergstrom	DFL
64B	Beth Fraser	DFL
64B	Matt Freeman	DFL
64B	Melanie McMahon	DFL
64B	Gloria Zaiger	DFL

=== Seats changing parties ===
Seat gains and holds by party

Party	Incumbent	District	First elected	Defeated by	Party
DFL	Zach Dorholt	14B	2012	Jim Knoblach	Republican
DFL	Roger Erickson	2A	2012	Dave Hancock	Republican
DFL	Andrew Falk	17A	2008	Tim Miller	Republican
DFL	Tim Faust	11B	2006, 2012*	Jason Rarick	Republican
DFL	Patti Fritz	24B	2004	Brian Daniels	Republican
DFL	Jay McNamar	12A	2012	Jeff Backer	Republican
DFL	Will Morgan	56B	2006, 2012*	Roz Peterson	Republican
DFL	Joe Radinovich	10B	2012	Dale Lueck	Republican
DFL	Shannon Savick	27A	2012	Peggy Bennett	Republican
DFL	Mary Sawatzky	17B	2012	Dave Baker	Republican
DFL	John Ward	10A	2006	Josh Heintzeman	Republican

*Elected to non-consecutive terms.

== Analysis ==
The Republicans made most of their gains in rural districts, continuing a trend of rural districts leaning more towards the Republicans and suburban districts leaning more towards the DFL. Of the 11 districts they gained from the DFL, 10 are outside of the Twin Cities metropolitan area.

Seven rural DFL incumbents who voted for legalizing same-sex marriage lost their seats, despite their districts having supported a proposed constitutional amendment in 2012 to ban it. Yet two rural DFL incumbents who voted against legalizing same-sex marriage also lost their seats.

Split-ticket voters determined the outcome of several key races. Nearly 450,000 voters chose one party's candidate for a House seat, but then switched to pick a different party's candidate for the United States Senate or governor. Eight of the 11 districts the DFL lost featured at least some ticket splitting between DFL candidate for governor Mark Dayton and/or U.S. Senate candidate Al Franken and the Republican House candidate. Nearly all of the DFL candidates who lost came from districts in which many voters supported Republicans in previous elections, including candidates for governor Republican Tom Emmer over Democrat Mark Dayton in 2010 and presidential candidates Republican Mitt Romney over Democratic president Barack Obama in 2012.

Outside and party spending reached large levels in several House districts compared to what has been spent in the past as Republican groups focused their attention on the House rather than statewide races. In some races, spending reached $500,000.

Turnout was the lowest in more than 20 years, with slightly over 50 percent of eligible voters having voted. Turnout across the state was lower compared to 2010. It was slightly lower in the Twin Cities and surrounding suburbs, helping suburban DFL candidates win in those areas. In rural Minnesota, turnout was down by about 10 percentage points since 2010. Much of the drop-off was among DFL voters, while those who did vote in those districts were likely over the age of 45.

== See also ==
- Minnesota Senate election, 2012
- Minnesota gubernatorial election, 2014
- Minnesota elections, 2014
