= 2012 Minnesota House of Representatives election =

- November 6, 2012

All 134 seats in the Minnesota House of Representatives 68 seats needed for a majority
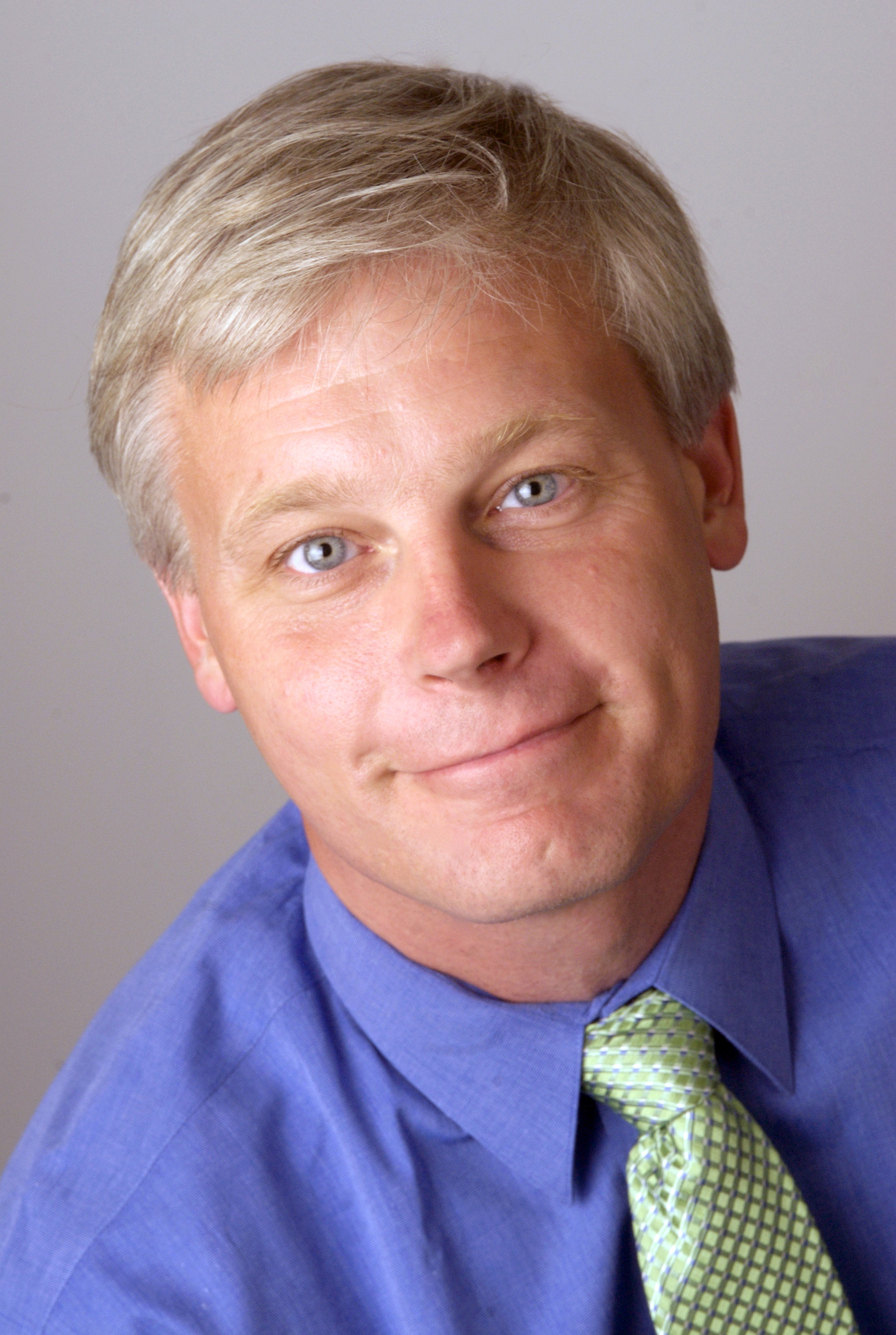

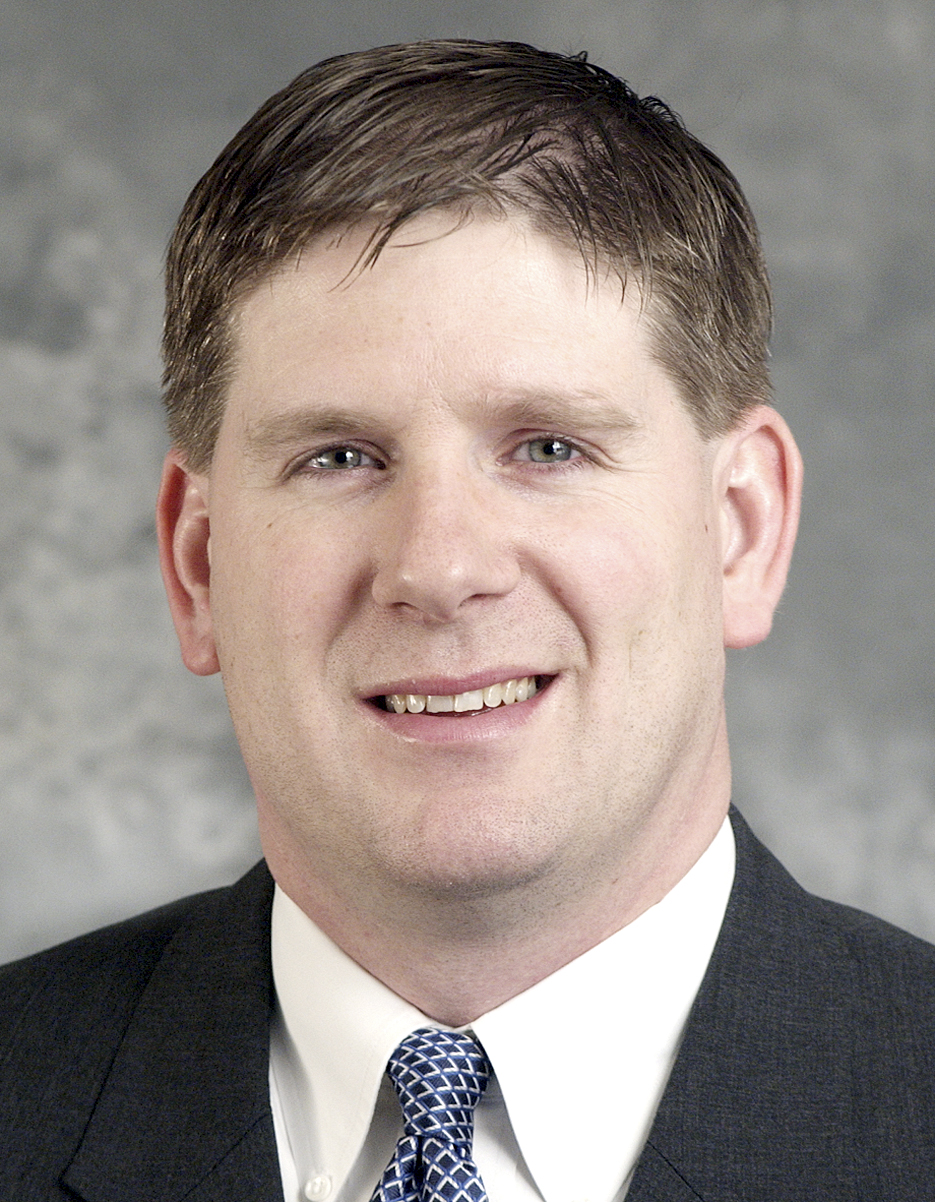
	Majority party	Minority party
Leader	Paul Thissen	Kurt Zellers
Party	Democratic (DFL)	Republican
Leader since	January 4, 2011	June 23, 2009
Leader's seat	61B–Minneapolis	34B–Maple Grove
Last election	62 seats, 48.49%	72 seats, 50.44%
Seats won	73	61
Seat change	▲11	▼11
Popular vote	1,468,364	1,233,214
Percentage	53.74%	45.13%
Swing	▲5.25 pp	▼5.31 pp
Speaker before election
Kurt Zellers
Republican
Elected Speaker
Paul Thissen
Democratic (DFL)

The 2012 Minnesota House of Representatives election was held in the U.S. state of Minnesota on November 6, 2012, to elect members to the House of Representatives of the 88th Minnesota Legislature. A primary election was held in several districts on August 14, 2012.

The Minnesota Democratic–Farmer–Labor Party (DFL) won a majority of seats, defeating the majority of the Republican Party of Minnesota. This was the first election for the Republicans since it won a majority of seats in the 2010 election, after losing a majority to the DFL in the 2006 election. The new Legislature convened on January 8, 2013.

== Primary election results ==
District	Party	Candidates	Votes	%
2B	Republican	Steve Green	790	53.45
2B	Republican	David Collins	688	46.55
2B	DFL	Brita Sailer	1,188	100.00
4A	Republican	Travis Reimche	768	69.44
4A	Republican	Ken Lucier	262	23.69
4A	Republican	Benjamin Larson	76	6.87
4A	DFL	Ben Lien	853	74.30
4A	DFL	Sue Wiger	295	25.70
6B	Republican	Jesse Colangelo	689	64.21
6B	Republican	Dan Darbo	384	35.79
6B	DFL	Jason Metsa	3,396	53.96
6B	DFL	Lorrie Janatopoulos	2,590	41.16
6B	DFL	Dave Meyer	307	4.88
7A	Republican	Therese Bower	400	100.00
7A	DFL	Tom Huntley	3,337	81.51
7A	DFL	Brandon Clokey	757	18.49
8B	Republican	Mary Franson	1,167	100.00
8B	DFL	Bob Cunniff	1,342	75.82
8B	DFL	Bruce Campbell	428	24.18
10B	Republican	Dale Lueck	1,538	100.00
10B	DFL	Joe Radinovich	2,422	76.00
10B	DFL	David Schaaf	765	24.00
11A	Independence	Cory Pylkka	27	100.00
11A	Republican	Jim Putnam	621	100.00
11A	DFL	Mike Sundin	2,364	57.60
11A	DFL	Bruce Ahlgren	1,740	42.40
11B	Republican	Ben Wiener	1,848	57.39
11B	Republican	Mitch Pangerl	1,372	42.61
11B	DFL	Tim Faust	2,193	62.57
11B	DFL	Nathan Johnson	1,312	37.43
15B	Republican	Jim Newberger	679	100.00
15B	DFL	Brian Johnson	480	77.80
15B	DFL	Bruno Gad	137	22.20
17B	Independence	Zachary Liebl	63	100.00
17B	Republican	Bruce Vogel	689	100.00
17B	DFL	Mary Sawatzky	1,994	65.92
17B	DFL	Jessica Rohloff	1,031	34.08
24A	Republican	John Petersburg	1,488	66.10
24A	Republican	Larry Johnson	763	33.90
24A	DFL	Craig Brenden	484	100.00
33B	Republican	Cindy Pugh	2,251	70.34
33B	Republican	Steve Smith	949	29.66
33B	DFL	Denise Bader	681	100.00
35B	Republican	Peggy Scott	987	100.00
35B	DFL	Sam Scott	497	70.80
35B	DFL	Samuel Beard	205	29.20
37B	Republican	Tim Sanders	978	89.72
37B	Republican	Torey Hall	112	10.28
37B	DFL	Jon Chlebeck	522	100.00
43A	Republican	Stacey Stout	774	100.00
43A	DFL	Peter Fischer	1,534	53.67
43A	DFL	Bob Hill	1,324	46.33
43B	Republican	Kevin Klein	336	55.45
43B	Republican	Bob Zick	270	44.55
43B	DFL	Leon Lillie	1,224	100.00
51A	Republican	Diane Anderson	979	100.00
51A	DFL	Sandra Masin	828	88.09
51A	DFL	Milton Walden	112	11.91
52A	Republican	Joe Blum	704	53.74
52A	Republican	David Meisinger	606	46.26
52A	DFL	Rick Hansen	1,242	100.00
55B	Republican	Tony Albright	897	78.75
55B	Republican	Tim Jesperson	242	21.25
55B	DFL	Travis Burton	449	100.00
59A	Republican	Cindy Lilly	225	100.00
59A	DFL	Joe Mullery	1,441	77.27
59A	DFL	Marcus Harcus	424	22.73
59B	Republican	Gary Mazzotta	98	55.37
59B	Republican	Bill McGaughey	79	44.63
59B	DFL	Raymond Dehn	877	37.15
59B	DFL	Terra Cole	857	36.30
59B	DFL	Ian Alexander	627	26.56

Source: Minnesota Secretary of State

== General election ==
=== Opinion polling ===
Polling firm/client	Polling period	Sample size	Margin of error (pp)	Republican	DFL	Independence	Other	Undecided
SurveyUSA/KSTP-TV	November 1–3, 2012	556 LV	±4.2	40%	48%	6%	6%	1%
SurveyUSA/KSTP-TV	October 26–28, 2012	574 LV	±4.2	40%	45%	8%	6%	1%
SurveyUSA/KSTP-TV	October 12–14, 2012	550 LV	±4.3	36%	45%	8%	3%	9%
Public Policy Polling	October 5–8, 2012	937 LV	±3.2	40%	52%	—	—	8%
Public Policy Polling	September 10–11, 2012	824 LV	±3.4	44%	47%	—	—	9%
SurveyUSA/KSTP-TV	September 6–9, 2012	551 LV	±4.3	38%	45%	6%	3%	9%
SurveyUSA/KSTP-TV	July 17–19, 2012	552 LV	±4.3	40%	45%	8%	2%	6%
Public Policy Polling	May 31 – June 3, 2012	973	±3.1	36%	48%	—	—	16%
Public Policy Polling	January 21–22, 2012	1,236	±2.8	39%	48%	—	—	14%
Public Policy Polling	May 27–30, 2011	1,179	±2.9	40%	49%	—	—	11%

=== Predictions ===
Source	Ranking	As of
Governing	Tossup	October 24, 2012

== Results ==
Districts won.

Summary of the November 6, 2012 Minnesota House of Representatives election results
Party	Candidates	Votes			Seats		
Party	Candidates	No.	%	∆pp	No.	∆No.	%
Minnesota Democratic–Farmer–Labor Party	132	1,468,364	53.74	▲5.25	73	▲11	54.48
Republican Party of Minnesota	132	1,233,214	45.13	▼5.31	61	▼11	45.52
Independence Party of Minnesota	10	13,585	0.50	▼0.10	0	Steady	0.00
Constitution Party of Minnesota	2	3,626	0.13	▲0.06	0	Steady	0.00
Ecology Democracy Party	1	1,423	0.05	▲0.05	0	Steady	0.00
Independent	1	2,303	0.08	▼0.09	0	Steady	0.00
Write-in	N/A	9,918	0.36	▲0.18	0	Steady	0.00
Total		2,732,433	100.00	±0.00	134	±0	100.00
Invalid/blank votes		218,347	7.40	▲4.13			
Turnout (out of 3,861,043 eligible voters)		2,950,780	76.42	▲20.59			
Source: Minnesota Secretary of State, Minnesota Legislative Reference Library

=== District results ===
District	Candidates	Party	Votes	%	Winner Party
1A	Dan Fabian	Republican	11,146	60.17	Republican
1A	Bruce Patterson	DFL	7,370	39.78	Republican
1B	Deb Kiel	Republican	9,401	51.90	Republican
1B	Marc Demers	DFL	8,685	47.95	Republican
2A	Roger Erickson	DFL	10,730	54.60	DFL
2A	Dave Hancock	Republican	8,901	45.29	DFL
2B	Steve Green	Republican	9,759	50.96	Republican
2B	Brita Sailer	DFL	9,376	48.96	Republican
3A	David Dill	DFL	14,671	66.75	DFL
3A	Jim Tuomala	Republican	7,228	32.88	DFL
3B	Mary Murphy	DFL	14,366	64.93	DFL
3B	Keith MacDonald	Republican	7,727	34.93	DFL
4A	Ben Lien	DFL	10,011	54.80	DFL
4A	Travis Reimche	Republican	8,218	44.99	DFL
4B	Paul Marquart	DFL	12,637	65.23	DFL
4B	Paul Sandman	Republican	6,719	34.68	DFL
5A	John Persell	DFL	10,901	56.12	DFL
5A	Larry Howes	Republican	8,497	43.75	DFL
5B	Tom Anzelc	DFL	11,162	53.41	DFL
5B	Carolyn McElfatrick	Republican	9,707	46.45	DFL
6A	Carly Melin	DFL	14,589	70.79	DFL
6A	Roger Weber	Republican	5,989	29.06	DFL
6B	Jason Metsa	DFL	15,146	68.17	DFL
6B	Jesse Colangelo	Republican	7,012	31.56	DFL
7A	Tom Huntley	DFL	15,622	70.88	DFL
7A	Therese Bower	Republican	6,302	28.59	DFL
7B	Erik Simonson	DFL	12,450	62.49	DFL
7B	Travis Silvers	Republican	4,345	21.81	DFL
8A	Bud Nornes	Republican	13,190	62.77	Republican
8A	Chester Nettestad	DFL	7,800	37.12	Republican
8B	Mary Franson	Republican	10,642	49.98	Republican
8B	Bob Cunniff	DFL	10,630	49.93	Republican
9A	Mark Anderson	Republican	10,972	57.97	Republican
9A	Don Niles	DFL	7,922	41.86	Republican
9B	Ron Kresha	Republican	9,881	52.97	Republican
9B	Adrian Welle	DFL	8,751	46.91	Republican
10A	John Ward	DFL	11,789	56.98	DFL
10A	Chris Kellett	Republican	8,872	42.88	DFL
10B	Joe Radinovich	DFL	11,087	50.69	DFL
10B	Dale Lueck	Republican	10,764	49.22	DFL
11A	Mike Sundin	DFL	12,610	63.87	DFL
11A	Jim Putnam	Republican	5,931	30.04	DFL
11A	Cory Pylkka	Independence	1,164	5.90	DFL
11B	Tim Faust	DFL	9,396	51.23	DFL
11B	Ben Wiener	Republican	8,908	48.57	DFL
12A	Jay McNamar	DFL	10,092	47.49	DFL
12A	Scott Dutcher	Republican	9,837	46.29	DFL
12A	Dave Holman	Independence	1,305	6.14	DFL
12B	Paul Anderson	Republican	13,043	66.33	Republican
12B	Rick Rosenfield	DFL	6,611	33.62	Republican
13A	Jeff Howe	Republican	12,073	59.08	Republican
13A	Richard Bohannon	DFL	8,337	40.80	Republican
13B	Tim O'Driscoll	Republican	12,076	60.22	Republican
13B	Shannon Schroeder	DFL	7,946	39.62	Republican
14A	Steve Gottwalt	Republican	10,269	53.90	Republican
14A	Anne Nolan	DFL	8,726	45.80	Republican
14B	Zach Dorholt	DFL	10,017	56.22	DFL
14B	King Banaian	Republican	7,749	43.49	DFL
15A	Sondra Erickson	Republican	10,027	52.36	Republican
15A	Joe Walsh	DFL	9,106	47.55	Republican
15B	Jim Newberger	Republican	11,414	57.77	Republican
15B	Brian Johnson	DFL	8,316	42.09	Republican
16A	Chris Swedzinski	Republican	10,991	56.72	Republican
16A	Al Kruse	DFL	8,363	43.16	Republican
16B	Paul Torkelson	Republican	11,243	56.14	Republican
16B	James Kanne	DFL	6,466	32.29	Republican
16B	Jerry Pagel	Independent	2,303	11.50	Republican
17A	Andrew Falk	DFL	10,489	53.86	DFL
17A	Tim Miller	Republican	8,956	45.99	DFL
17B	Mary Sawatzky	DFL	9,370	48.30	DFL
17B	Bruce Vogel	Republican	8,562	44.13	DFL
17B	Zachary Liebl	Independence	1,457	7.51	DFL
18A	Dean Urdahl	Republican	11,744	58.28	Republican
18A	Nancy Larson	DFL	8,372	41.55	Republican
18B	Glenn Gruenhagen	Republican	11,053	58.00	Republican
18B	Logan Campa	DFL	7,971	41.83	Republican
19A	Terry Morrow	DFL	17,263	97.65	DFL
19B	Kathy Brynaert	DFL	11,897	63.93	DFL
19B	Thad Shunkwiler	Republican	6,660	35.79	DFL
20A	Kelby Woodard	Republican	10,878	54.46	Republican
20A	Ryan Wolf	DFL	9,071	45.41	Republican
20B	David Bly	DFL	11,700	56.90	DFL
20B	Brian Wermerskirchen	Republican	8,843	43.00	DFL
21A	Tim Kelly	Republican	12,174	57.49	Republican
21A	John Bacon	DFL	8,969	42.35	Republican
21B	Steve Drazkowski	Republican	11,759	57.95	Republican
21B	Bruce Montplaisir	DFL	8,511	41.94	Republican
22A	Joe Schomacker	Republican	11,555	59.01	Republican
22A	Eugene Short	DFL	8,006	40.88	Republican
22B	Rod Hamilton	Republican	10,165	60.06	Republican
22B	Cheryl Avenel-Navara	DFL	6,745	39.85	Republican
23A	Bob Gunther	Republican	11,544	56.39	Republican
23A	Kevin Labenz	DFL	8,908	43.51	Republican
23B	Tony Cornish	Republican	16,278	96.25	Republican
24A	John Petersburg	Republican	9,906	52.18	Republican
24A	Craig Brenden	DFL	9,036	47.60	Republican
24B	Patti Fritz	DFL	9,988	56.71	DFL
24B	Dan Kaiser	Republican	7,608	43.20	DFL
25A	Duane Quam	Republican	11,056	54.55	Republican
25A	John Vossen	DFL	9,188	45.34	Republican
25B	Kim Norton	DFL	11,869	57.53	DFL
25B	Melissa Valeriano	Republican	8,725	42.29	DFL
26A	Tina Liebling	DFL	10,484	58.80	DFL
26A	Breanna Bly	Republican	7,306	40.97	DFL
26B	Mike Benson	Republican	12,427	57.10	Republican
26B	Pat Stallman	DFL	9,295	42.71	Republican
27A	Shannon Savick	DFL	9,743	47.70	DFL
27A	Rich Murray	Republican	9,090	44.50	DFL
27A	William Wagner	Independence	1,574	7.71	DFL
27B	Jeanne Poppe	DFL	11,486	62.78	DFL
27B	Nathan Neitzell	Republican	6,792	37.12	DFL
28A	Gene Pelowski	DFL	12,969	66.68	DFL
28A	Adam Pace	Republican	6,435	33.08	DFL
28B	Greg Davids	Republican	12,006	58.22	Republican
28B	Ken Tschumper	DFL	8,542	41.42	Republican
29A	Joe McDonald	Republican	13,002	61.94	Republican
29A	Susann Dye	DFL	7,954	37.89	Republican
29B	Marion O'Neill	Republican	9,654	50.15	Republican
29B	Barrett Chrissis	DFL	8,136	42.26	Republican
29B	Eugene Newcombe	Independence	1,429	7.42	Republican
30A	Nick Zerwas	Republican	12,723	63.74	Republican
30A	Holly Neuman	DFL	7,217	36.16	Republican
30B	David FitzSimmons	Republican	12,022	61.84	Republican
30B	Sharon Shimek	DFL	7,386	37.99	Republican
31A	Kurt Daudt	Republican	11,990	60.42	Republican
31A	Ryan Fiereck	DFL	7,823	39.42	Republican
31B	Tom Hackbarth	Republican	13,101	60.84	Republican
31B	Louise Fay Woodberry	DFL	8,391	38.97	Republican
32A	Brian Johnson	Republican	10,014	51.37	Republican
32A	Paul Gammel	DFL	8,601	44.13	Republican
32A	Paul Bergley	Constitution	851	4.37	Republican
32B	Bob Barrett	Republican	10,644	50.87	Republican
32B	Rick Olseen	DFL	10,251	49.00	Republican
33A	Jerry Hertaus	Republican	14,717	62.09	Republican
33A	Todd Mikkelson	DFL	8,963	37.81	Republican
33B	Cindy Pugh	Republican	13,211	54.36	Republican
33B	Denise Bader	DFL	11,053	45.48	Republican
34A	Joyce Peppin	Republican	14,386	64.24	Republican
34A	Adam Fisher	DFL	7,983	35.65	Republican
34B	Kurt Zellers	Republican	12,802	54.52	Republican
34B	David Hoden	DFL	10,652	45.36	Republican
35A	Jim Abeler	Republican	11,906	58.71	Republican
35A	Andy Hillebregt	DFL	6,755	33.31	Republican
35A	Justin Boals	Independence	1,587	7.83	Republican
35B	Peggy Scott	Republican	13,120	59.09	Republican
35B	Sam Scott	DFL	9,052	40.77	Republican
36A	Mark Uglem	Republican	10,691	51.00	Republican
36A	Grace Baltich	DFL	10,235	48.83	Republican
36B	Melissa Hortman	DFL	11,679	55.22	DFL
36B	Andrew Reinhardt	Republican	8,555	40.45	DFL
36B	Andrew Kratoska	Independence	891	4.21	DFL
37A	Jerry Newton	DFL	11,843	57.18	DFL
37A	Mandy Benz	Republican	8,830	42.64	DFL
37B	Tim Sanders	Republican	11,416	53.90	Republican
37B	Jon Chlebeck	DFL	9,723	45.90	Republican
38A	Linda Runbeck	Republican	12,197	58.00	Republican
38A	Patrick Davern	DFL	8,802	41.85	Republican
38B	Matt Dean	Republican	12,374	52.30	Republican
38B	Greg Pariseau	DFL	11,248	47.54	Republican
39A	Bob Dettmer	Republican	13,033	57.41	Republican
39A	John Bruno	DFL	9,638	42.45	Republican
39B	Kathy Lohmer	Republican	12,100	52.99	Republican
39B	Tom DeGree	DFL	10,707	46.89	Republican
40A	Mike Nelson	DFL	11,972	97.18	DFL
40B	Debra Hilstrom	DFL	12,024	71.24	DFL
40B	Richard Cushing	Republican	4,810	28.50	DFL
41A	Connie Bernardy	DFL	12,653	61.65	DFL
41A	Dale Helm	Republican	7,829	38.15	DFL
41B	Carolyn Laine	DFL	11,943	58.50	DFL
41B	Laura Palmer	Republican	5,669	27.77	DFL
41B	Tim Utz	Constitution	2,775	13.59	DFL
42A	Barb Yarusso	DFL	12,122	53.30	DFL
42A	Russ Bertsch	Republican	10,591	46.56	DFL
42B	Jason Isaacson	DFL	12,884	57.53	DFL
42B	Ken Rubenzer	Republican	9,462	42.25	DFL
43A	Peter Fischer	DFL	11,616	52.71	DFL
43A	Stacey Stout	Republican	10,374	47.08	DFL
43B	Leon Lillie	DFL	12,445	60.42	DFL
43B	Kevin Klein	Republican	8,111	39.38	DFL
44A	Sarah Anderson	Republican	12,114	51.22	Republican
44A	Audrey Britton	DFL	11,506	48.65	Republican
44B	John Benson	DFL	13,754	55.82	DFL
44B	Mark Stefan	Republican	10,848	44.03	DFL
45A	Lyndon Carlson	DFL	12,520	59.59	DFL
45A	Jeff Pauley	Republican	8,459	40.26	DFL
45B	Mike Freiberg	DFL	15,053	65.95	DFL
45B	Reid Johnson	Republican	7,740	33.91	DFL
46A	Ryan Winkler	DFL	15,249	65.89	DFL
46A	John Swanson	Republican	7,860	33.96	DFL
46B	Steve Simon	DFL	14,956	69.98	DFL
46B	David Arvidson	Republican	6,372	29.81	DFL
47A	Ernie Leidiger	Republican	12,938	62.53	Republican
47A	Keith Pickering	DFL	7,718	37.30	Republican
47B	Joe Hoppe	Republican	16,391	97.15	Republican
48A	Yvonne Selcer	DFL	12,458	50.34	DFL
48A	Kirk Stensrud	Republican	12,256	49.52	DFL
48B	Jenifer Loon	Republican	12,787	58.91	Republican
48B	Tori Hill	DFL	8,891	40.96	Republican
49A	Ron Erhardt	DFL	14,101	55.79	DFL
49A	Bill Glahn	Republican	11,139	44.07	DFL
49B	Paul Rosenthal	DFL	13,560	53.31	DFL
49B	Terry Jacobson	Republican	11,840	46.55	DFL
50A	Linda Slocum	DFL	12,036	62.14	DFL
50A	Craig Marston	Republican	5,864	30.28	DFL
50A	Joseph Koch	Independence	1,439	7.43	DFL
50B	Ann Lenczewski	DFL	14,800	65.27	DFL
50B	Richard Bohnen	Republican	7,836	34.56	DFL
51A	Sandra Masin	DFL	11,724	55.49	DFL
51A	Diane Anderson	Republican	9,354	44.28	DFL
51B	Laurie Halverson	DFL	12,210	51.88	DFL
51B	Doug Wardlow	Republican	11,298	48.01	DFL
52A	Rick Hansen	DFL	13,732	62.45	DFL
52A	Joe Blum	Republican	8,216	37.36	DFL
52B	Joe Atkins	DFL	14,493	66.02	DFL
52B	Paul Tuschy	Republican	7,430	33.85	DFL
53A	JoAnn Ward	DFL	11,932	56.19	DFL
53A	Pam Cunningham	Republican	9,269	43.65	DFL
53B	Andrea Kieffer	Republican	12,060	54.84	Republican
53B	Ann Marie Metzger	DFL	9,909	45.06	Republican
54A	Dan Schoen	DFL	11,069	54.82	DFL
54A	Derrick Lehrke	Republican	7,664	37.96	DFL
54A	Ron Lischeid	Independence	1,428	7.07	DFL
54B	Denny McNamara	Republican	12,493	57.43	Republican
54B	Joanna Bayers	DFL	9,228	42.42	Republican
55A	Mike Beard	Republican	10,008	54.55	Republican
55A	Chuck Berg	DFL	8,294	45.21	Republican
55B	Tony Albright	Republican	13,569	63.39	Republican
55B	Travis Burton	DFL	7,808	36.48	Republican
56A	Pam Myhra	Republican	10,905	53.93	Republican
56A	Dave John Jensen	DFL	9,278	45.88	Republican
56B	Will Morgan	DFL	10,685	50.32	DFL
56B	Roz Peterson	Republican	10,515	49.52	DFL
57A	Tara Mack	Republican	11,420	53.37	Republican
57A	Roberta Gibbons	DFL	9,941	46.46	Republican
57B	Anna Wills	Republican	11,906	53.18	Republican
57B	Jeff Wilfahrt	DFL	10,452	46.69	Republican
58A	Mary Liz Holberg	Republican	12,419	59.09	Republican
58A	Colin Lee	DFL	8,574	40.80	Republican
58B	Pat Garofalo	Republican	12,520	59.47	Republican
58B	Jim Arlt	DFL	8,512	40.44	Republican
59A	Joe Mullery	DFL	14,017	84.00	DFL
59A	Cindy Lilly	Republican	2,577	15.44	DFL
59B	Raymond Dehn	DFL	12,790	72.39	DFL
59B	Gary Mazzotta	Republican	3,346	18.94	DFL
59B	Anthony Hilton	Ecology; Democracy	1,423	8.05	DFL
60A	Diane Loeffler	DFL	17,021	81.87	DFL
60A	Brent Millsop	Republican	3,687	17.73	DFL
60B	Phyllis Kahn	DFL	12,472	77.98	DFL
60B	Kody Zalewski	Republican	3,392	21.21	DFL
61A	Frank Hornstein	DFL	19,663	80.22	DFL
61A	Devin Gawnemark	Republican	4,787	19.53	DFL
61B	Paul Thissen	DFL	19,748	81.39	DFL
61B	Nate Atkins	Republican	4,448	18.33	DFL
62A	Karen Clark	DFL	12,672	89.56	DFL
62A	Kurt Hanna	Republican	1,410	9.97	DFL
62B	Susan Allen	DFL	16,318	88.63	DFL
62B	Tom Johnson	Republican	2,025	11.00	DFL
63A	Jim Davnie	DFL	19,680	85.42	DFL
63A	Kirk Brink	Republican	3,289	14.28	DFL
63B	Jean Wagenius	DFL	17,181	76.38	DFL
63B	Matt Ashley	Republican	5,240	23.30	DFL
64A	Erin Murphy	DFL	17,828	78.77	DFL
64A	Andrew Ojeda	Republican	4,737	20.93	DFL
64B	Michael Paymar	DFL	17,273	72.11	DFL
64B	Brandon Carmack	Republican	6,612	27.60	DFL
65A	Rena Moran	DFL	13,263	84.40	DFL
65A	Daniel Lipp	Republican	2,387	15.19	DFL
65B	Carlos Mariani	DFL	13,176	77.96	DFL
65B	Carlos Conway	Republican	3,653	21.62	DFL
66A	Alice Hausman	DFL	14,160	62.97	DFL
66A	Mark Fotsch	Republican	6,984	31.06	DFL
66A	Dave Thomas	Independence	1,311	5.83	DFL
66B	John Lesch	DFL	11,504	79.20	DFL
66B	Ben Blomgren	Republican	2,951	20.32	DFL
67A	Tim Mahoney	DFL	10,533	77.84	DFL
67A	Cathy Hennelly	Republican	2,941	21.73	DFL
67B	Sheldon Johnson	DFL	11,318	75.77	DFL
67B	John Quinn	Republican	3,569	23.89	DFL

== See also ==
- Minnesota Senate election, 2012
- Minnesota gubernatorial election, 2010
- Minnesota elections, 2012
