= 2020 Minnesota House of Representatives election =

- November 3, 2020

All 134 seats in the Minnesota House of Representatives 68 seats needed for a majority
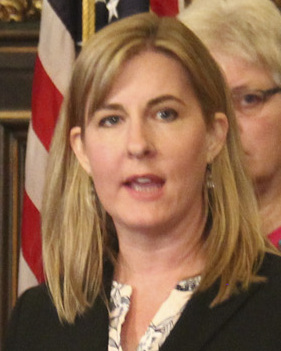

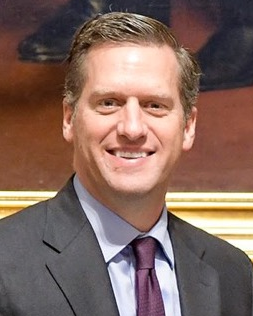
	Majority party	Minority party
Leader	Melissa Hortman	Kurt Daudt
Party	Democratic (DFL)	Republican
Leader since	January 3, 2017	January 8, 2013
Leader's seat	36B–Brooklyn Park	31A–Crown
Last election	75 seats, 54.40%	59 seats, 45.09%
Seats won	70	64
Seat change	▼5	▲5
Popular vote	1,601,357	1,510,928
Percentage	51.06%	48.17%
Swing	▼3.34 pp	▲3.09 pp
Speaker before election
Melissa Hortman
Democratic (DFL)
Elected Speaker
Melissa Hortman
Democratic (DFL)

The 2020 Minnesota House of Representatives election was held in the U.S. state of Minnesota on November 3, 2020, to elect members to the House of Representatives of the 92nd Minnesota Legislature. A primary election was held in several districts on August 11, 2020. The election coincided with the election of the other house of the Legislature, the Senate, and other elections.

== Background ==
The last election in 2018 resulted in the Minnesota Democratic–Farmer–Labor Party (DFL) winning a majority of 75 seats, ending four years of a Republican majority. As there was no Senate election, this resulted in split control of the Legislature, with Republicans holding a majority in the Senate they won in 2016.

== Electoral system ==
The 134 members of the House of Representatives were elected from single-member districts via first-past-the-post voting for two-year terms. Contested nominations of recognized major parties (DFL, Grassroots–Legalize Cannabis, Legal Marijuana Now, and Republican) for each district were determined by an open primary election. Minor party candidates were nominated by petition. Write-in candidates must have filed a request with the secretary of state's office for votes for them to be counted. The filing period was from May 19 to June 2, 2020.

== Retiring members ==
Retiring incumbents (light red and light blue) by district.

=== DFL ===
- Ben Lien, 4A
- Jack Considine, 19B
- Duane Sauke, 25B
- Lyndon Carlson, 45A
- Laurie Halverson, 51B
- Hunter Cantrell, 56A
- Alice Mann, 56B
- Jean Wagenius, 63B
- Tim Mahoney, 67A

=== Republican ===
- Dan Fabian, 1A
- Sandy Layman, 5B
- Bud Nornes, 8A
- Bob Vogel, 20A
- Bob Gunther, 23A
- Linda Runbeck, 38A

== Primary elections results ==
A primary election was held in 23 districts to nominate Republican and DFL candidates. 11 Republican nominations and 12 DFL nominations were contested. Nine incumbents were opposed for their party's nomination. DFL incumbents Raymond Dehn in District 59B and John Lesch in District 66B were not renominated.

Primary results by district
District		Party	Candidates	Votes	%
1A		Republican	John Burkel	3,167	90.85
1A		Republican	David Lion	193	5.54
1A		Republican	Brian Meehan	126	3.61
1A		DFL	Connie Lindstrom	1,821	100.00
4A		Republican	Edwin Hahn	848	100.00
4A		DFL	Heather Keeler	1,888	66.32
4A		DFL	Chuck Hendrickson	959	33.68
15B		Republican	Shane Mekeland	1,867	71.89
15B		Republican	John Ulrick	730	28.11
15B		DFL	Ron Thiessen	1,024	100.00
16B		Republican	Paul Torkelson	2,621	78.83
16B		Republican	Tammy Houle	704	21.17
16B		DFL	Mindy Kimmel	1,953	100.00
17A		LMN	Ed Engelmann	50	100.00
17A		Republican	Tim Miller	2,672	100.00
17A		DFL	Ben Dolan	1,593	80.17
17A		DFL	Robert Wright	394	19.83
23	A	Republican	Bjorn Olson	2,484	57.34
23	A	Republican	Michael Sukalski	1,848	42.66
23	A	DFL	Pat Bacon	1,409	100.00
23	B	Republican	Jeremy Munson	3,045	79.40
23	B	Republican	Yvonne Simon	790	20.60
23	B	DFL	Leroy McClelland	1,781	100.00
27A		Republican	Peggy Bennett	2,018	100.00
27A		DFL	Thomas Martinez	1,705	70.45
27A		DFL	Joe Pacovsky	715	29.55
31A		Republican	Kurt Daudt	1,940	86.45
31A		Republican	Beau Hullermann	304	13.55
31A		DFL	Brad Brown	1,277	100.00
32B		Republican	Anne Neu	1,559	80.94
32B		Republican	Joelle Walmsley	367	19.06
32B		DFL	Katie Malchow	1,926	100.00
33B		Republican	Andrew Myers	2,222	70.47
33B		Republican	Marianne Stebbins	931	29.53
33B		DFL	Kelly Morrison	4,778	100.00
38A		Republican	Donald Raleigh	1,508	55.79
38A		Republican	Doug Malsom	788	29.15
38A		Republican	Kelly Gunderson	407	15.06
38A		DFL	Kris Fredrick	2,808	100.00
39A		Republican	Bob Dettmer	1,573	100.00
39A		DFL	Ann Mozey	3,260	91.21
39A		DFL	Chuck Fitzer	314	8.79
45A		Republican	Jesse Pfliger	1,181	100.00
45A		DFL	Cedrick Frazier	3,697	68.77
45A		DFL	Daonna Depoister	1,679	31.23
51	A	Republican	Patrick Zurick	1,180	100.00
51	A	DFL	Sandra Masin	3,145	81.73
51	A	DFL	Justin Clark	703	18.27
51	B	Republican	Fern Smith	1,134	100.00
51	B	DFL	Liz Reyer	3,173	63.54
51	B	DFL	Mike Maguire	1,821	36.46
55A		LMN	Ryan Martin	40	100.00
55A		Republican	Erik Mortensen	1,673	55.00
55A		Republican	Bob Loonan	1,369	45.00
55A		DFL	Brad Tabke	2,056	100.00
56A		Republican	Pam Myhra	1,622	91.95
56A		Republican	Basil Martin	142	8.05
56A		DFL	Jess Hanson	3,149	100.00
59B		Republican	Alan Shilepsky	402	100.00
59B		DFL	Esther Agbaje	4,443	48.24
59B		DFL	Raymond Dehn	3,836	41.65
59B		DFL	Isaiah Whitmore	932	10.12
63	A	LMN	David Wiester	87	100.00
63	A	Republican	Penny Arcos	475	100.00
63	A	DFL	Jim Davnie	11,563	79.61
63	A	DFL	April Kane	2,961	20.39
63	B	LMN	Dennis Schuller	73	100.00
63	B	Republican	Frank Pafko	775	100.00
63	B	DFL	Emma Greenman	7,380	63.98
63	B	DFL	Jerome Evans	3,032	26.29
63	B	DFL	Husniyah Dent Bradley	1,123	9.74
66B		Republican	Mikki Murray	470	100.00
66B		DFL	Athena Hollins	2,974	60.73
66B		DFL	John Lesch	1,923	39.27
67A		Republican	John Stromenger	416	100.00
67A		DFL	John Thompson	1,603	59.33
67A		DFL	Hoang Murphy	1,099	40.67
Source: Minnesota Secretary of State

== Predictions ==
Source	Ranking	As of
The Cook Political Report	Lean D	October 21, 2020

== Results ==
Districts won

Party	Candidates	Votes			Seats		
Party	Candidates	No.	%	+/−	No.	+/−	%
Minnesota Democratic–Farmer–Labor Party	133	1,601,357	51.06	−3.34	70	−5	52.24
Republican Party of Minnesota	130	1,510,928	48.17	+3.09	64	+5	47.76
Legal Marijuana Now Party	5	8,780	0.28	+0.28	0	0	0.00
Grassroots–Legalize Cannabis Party	1	4,054	0.13	+0.13	0	0	0.00
Veterans Party of Minnesota	3	3,455	0.11	+0.11	0	0	0.00
Green Party of Minnesota	1	1,804	0.06	+0.06	0	0	0.00
Write-in	N/A	6,136	0.20	+0.04	0	0	0.00
Total		3,136,514	100.00	±0.00	134	±0	100.00
Invalid/blank votes		157,266	4.77	+2.55			
Turnout (out of 4,118,462 eligible voters)		3,293,780	79.98	+15.73			
Source: Minnesota Secretary of State, Star Tribune

=== Seats changing parties ===
Seat gains and holds by party

Party	Incumbent	District	First elected	Winner	Party
DFL	John Persell	5A	2008 (Note: Lost re-election in 2016. Elected again in 2018.)	Matt Bliss	Republican
DFL	Jeff Brand	19A	2018	Susan Akland	Republican
DFL	Jeanne Poppe	27B	2004	Patricia Mueller	Republican
DFL	Anne Claflin	54A	2018	Keith Franke	Republican
DFL	Brad Tabke	55A	2018	Erik Mortensen	Republican

=== Close races ===
Districts where the margin of victory was under 10%:

- District 3
1. Seat A, 4.92%
- District 4
1. Seat B, 5.51%
- District 5
1. Seat A, 6.91% (gain)
- District 6
1. Seat A, 0.19%
2. Seat B, 9.21%
- District 11
1. Seat A, 2.93%
- District 14
1. Seat A, 8.1%
- District 19
1. Seat A, 0.48% (gain)
- District 20
1. Seat B, 5.09%
- District 26
1. Seat B, 1.26%
- District 27
1. Seat B, 3.18% (gain)
- District 33
1. Seat B, 1.11%
- District 34
1. Seat B, 7.36%
- District 36
1. Seat B, 2.89%
- District 37
1. Seat B, 4.92%
- District 38
1. Seat A, 7.3%
2. Seat B, 0.36%
- District 39
1. Seat B, 0.85%
- District 47
1. Seat B, 3.21%
- District 53
1. Seat B, 6.26%
- District 54
1. Seat A, 2.96% (gain)
2. Seat B, 7.21%
- District 55
1. Seat A, 2.41% (gain)
- District 56
1. Seat A, 3.33%
2. Seat B, 4.88%

=== District results ===
Table of results
District		Incumbent			Candidates				
District		Name	Party	First elected	Name	Party	Votes	%	Winner Party
1	A	Dan Fabian (Note: Retiring; not seeking re-election.)	Republican	2010	John Burkel	Republican	15,169	72.75	Republican
1	A	Dan Fabian	Republican	2010	Connie Lindstrom	DFL	5,670	27.19	Republican
1	B	Deb Kiel	Republican	2010	Deb Kiel	Republican	13,904	70.90	Republican
1	B	Deb Kiel	Republican	2010	Cindy Ansbacher	DFL	5,687	29.00	Republican
2	A	Matt Grossell	Republican	2016	Matt Grossell	Republican	14,009	62.43	Republican
2	A	Matt Grossell	Republican	2016	Jeremiah Liend	DFL	8,395	37.41	Republican
2	B	Steve Green	Republican	2012	Steve Green	Republican	14,496	66.19	Republican
2	B	Steve Green	Republican	2012	David Suby	DFL	7,384	33.72	Republican
3	A	Rob Ecklund	DFL	2015 (Note: Elected in a special election.)	Rob Ecklund	DFL	12,581	52.42	DFL
3	A	Rob Ecklund	DFL	2015	Thomas Manninen	Republican	11,400	47.50	DFL
3	B	Mary Murphy	DFL	1976	Mary Murphy	DFL	13,865	56.62	DFL
3	B	Mary Murphy	DFL	1976	Andrew Hjelle	Republican	10,603	43.30	DFL
4	A	Ben Lien	DFL	2012	Heather Keeler	DFL	11,487	56.67	DFL
4	A	Ben Lien	DFL	2012	Edwin Hahn	Republican	8,748	43.16	DFL
4	B	Paul Marquart	DFL	2000	Paul Marquart	DFL	12,022	52.73	DFL
4	B	Paul Marquart	DFL	2000	Brian Anderson	Republican	10,766	47.22	DFL
5	A	John Persell	DFL	2008	Matt Bliss	Republican	11,482	53.37	Republican
5	A	John Persell	DFL	2008	John Persell	DFL	9,996	46.46	Republican
5	B	Sandy Layman	Republican	2016	Spencer Igo	Republican	14,432	61.04	Republican
5	B	Sandy Layman	Republican	2016	Joe Abeyta	DFL	9,187	38.85	Republican
6	A	Julie Sandstede	DFL	2016	Julie Sandstede	DFL	10,781	50.04	DFL
6	A	Julie Sandstede	DFL	2016	Rob Farnsworth	Republican	10,741	49.85	DFL
6	B	Dave Lislegard	DFL	2018	Dave Lislegard	DFL	12,648	54.54	DFL
6	B	Dave Lislegard	DFL	2018	Julie Buria	Republican	10,513	45.33	DFL
7	A	Jennifer Schultz	DFL	2014	Jennifer Schultz	DFL	16,021	70.47	DFL
7	A	Jennifer Schultz	DFL	2014	Tom Sullivan	Republican	6,684	29.40	DFL
7	B	Liz Olson	DFL	2016	Liz Olson	DFL	14,769	68.15	DFL
7	B	Liz Olson	DFL	2016	Art Johnston	Republican	6,879	31.74	DFL
8	A	Bud Nornes	Republican	1996	Jordan Rasmusson	Republican	15,998	65.90	Republican
8	A	Bud Nornes	Republican	1996	Brittney Johnson	DFL	8,243	33.96	Republican
8	B	Mary Franson	Republican	2010	Mary Franson	Republican	17,307	68.03	Republican
8	B	Mary Franson	Republican	2010	Carol Wenner	DFL	8,101	31.84	Republican
9	A	John Poston	Republican	2016	John Poston	Republican	16,414	73.95	Republican
9	A	John Poston	Republican	2016	Alex Herring	DFL	5,752	25.91	Republican
9	B	Ron Kresha	Republican	2012	Ron Kresha	Republican	16,855	77.09	Republican
9	B	Ron Kresha	Republican	2012	Laura Wright	DFL	4,979	22.77	Republican
10	A	Josh Heintzeman	Republican	2014	Josh Heintzeman	Republican	15,674	64.93	Republican
10	A	Josh Heintzeman	Republican	2014	Dale Menk	DFL	8,443	34.98	Republican
10	B	Dale Lueck	Republican	2014	Dale Lueck	Republican	17,031	69.41	Republican
10	B	Dale Lueck	Republican	2014	Gaylene Spolarich	DFL	7,497	30.55	Republican
11	A	Mike Sundin	DFL	2012	Mike Sundin	DFL	11,452	51.41	DFL
11	A	Mike Sundin	DFL	2012	Jeff Dotseth	Republican	10,798	48.48	DFL
11	B	Nathan Nelson	Republican	2019	Nathan Nelson	Republican	13,484	65.34	Republican
11	B	Nathan Nelson	Republican	2019	Jack Frechette	DFL	7,145	34.62	Republican
12	A	Jeff Backer	Republican	2014	Jeff Backer	Republican	14,775	66.88	Republican
12	A	Jeff Backer	Republican	2014	Murray Smart	DFL	7,299	33.04	Republican
12	B	Paul Anderson	Republican	2008	Paul Anderson	Republican	17,151	75.01	Republican
12	B	Paul Anderson	Republican	2008	Ben Schirmers	DFL	5,697	24.92	Republican
13	A	Lisa Demuth	Republican	2018	Lisa Demuth	Republican	16,056	70.75	Republican
13	A	Lisa Demuth	Republican	2018	Katy Westlund	DFL	6,610	29.13	Republican
13	B	Tim O'Driscoll	Republican	2010	Tim O'Driscoll	Republican	16,524	68.16	Republican
13	B	Tim O'Driscoll	Republican	2010	Benjamin Carollo	DFL	7,684	31.70	Republican
14	A	Tama Theis	Republican	2013	Tama Theis	Republican	11,887	53.93	Republican
14	A	Tama Theis	Republican	2013	Tami Calhoun	DFL	10,102	45.83	Republican
14	B	Dan Wolgamott	DFL	2018	Dan Wolgamott	DFL	9,422	55.93	DFL
14	B	Dan Wolgamott	DFL	2018	Paul Brandmire	Republican	7,383	43.82	DFL
15	A	Sondra Erickson	Republican	1998 (Note: Elected in a special election. Lost re-election in 2008. Elected again in 2010.)	Sondra Erickson	Republican	15,717	71.19	Republican
15	A	Sondra Erickson	Republican	1998	Cal Schmock	DFL	6,329	28.67	Republican
15	B	Shane Mekeland	Republican	2018	Shane Mekeland	Republican	17,616	70.55	Republican
15	B	Shane Mekeland	Republican	2018	Ron Thiessen	DFL	5,898	23.62	Republican
15	B	Shane Mekeland	Republican	2018	Myron Wilson	Veterans	1,425	5.71	Republican
16	A	Chris Swedzinski	Republican	2010	Chris Swedzinski	Republican	13,930	69.15	Republican
16	A	Chris Swedzinski	Republican	2010	Doria Drost	DFL	6,200	30.78	Republican
16	B	Paul Torkelson	Republican	2008	Paul Torkelson	Republican	14,476	67.61	Republican
16	B	Paul Torkelson	Republican	2008	Mindy Kimmel	DFL	6,908	32.26	Republican
17	A	Tim Miller	Republican	2014	Tim Miller	Republican	13,272	64.30	Republican
17	A	Tim Miller	Republican	2014	Ben Dolan	DFL	6,357	30.80	Republican
17	A	Tim Miller	Republican	2014	Ed Engelmann	LMN	1,007	4.88	Republican
17	B	Dave Baker	Republican	2014	Dave Baker	Republican	14,997	70.67	Republican
17	B	Dave Baker	Republican	2014	Logan Kortgard	DFL	6,198	29.21	Republican
18	A	Dean Urdahl	Republican	2002	Dean Urdahl	Republican	19,594	97.59	Republican
18	B	Glenn Gruenhagen	Republican	2010	Glenn Gruenhagen	Republican	15,475	71.37	Republican
18	B	Glenn Gruenhagen	Republican	2010	Heather Bakke	DFL	6,185	28.52	Republican
19	A	Jeff Brand	DFL	2018	Susan Akland	Republican	11,621	50.15	Republican
19	A	Jeff Brand	DFL	2018	Jeff Brand	DFL	11,510	49.67	Republican
19	B	Jack Considine	DFL	2014	Luke Frederick	DFL	12,052	59.68	DFL
19	B	Jack Considine	DFL	2014	Jeremy Loger	Republican	8,098	40.10	DFL
20	A	Bob Vogel	Republican	2014	Brian Pfarr	Republican	16,922	68.65	Republican
20	A	Bob Vogel	Republican	2014	Erina Prom	DFL	7,705	31.26	Republican
20	B	Todd Lippert	DFL	2018	Todd Lippert	DFL	12,585	52.49	DFL
20	B	Todd Lippert	DFL	2018	Joe Moravchik	Republican	11,366	47.40	DFL
21	A	Barb Haley	Republican	2016	Barb Haley	Republican	13,961	59.60	Republican
21	A	Barb Haley	Republican	2016	Matt Bruns	DFL	9,436	40.28	Republican
21	B	Steve Drazkowski	Republican	2007	Steve Drazkowski	Republican	15,647	66.58	Republican
21	B	Steve Drazkowski	Republican	2007	Elise Diesslin	DFL	7,831	33.32	Republican
22	A	Joe Schomacker	Republican	2010	Joe Schomacker	Republican	15,161	73.02	Republican
22	A	Joe Schomacker	Republican	2010	Chris Baumberger	DFL	5,584	26.89	Republican
22	B	Rod Hamilton	Republican	2004	Rod Hamilton	Republican	12,809	72.89	Republican
22	B	Rod Hamilton	Republican	2004	Lynn Herrick	DFL	4,748	27.02	Republican
23	A	Bob Gunther	Republican	1995	Bjorn Olson	Republican	14,324	68.45	Republican
23	A	Bob Gunther	Republican	1995	Pat Bacon	DFL	6,523	31.17	Republican
23	B	Jeremy Munson	Republican	2018	Jeremy Munson	Republican	13,919	64.67	Republican
23	B	Jeremy Munson	Republican	2018	Leroy McClelland	DFL	7,577	35.20	Republican
24	A	John Petersburg	Republican	2012	John Petersburg	Republican	13,066	61.15	Republican
24	A	John Petersburg	Republican	2012	Tom Shea	DFL	8,281	38.76	Republican
24	B	Brian Daniels	Republican	2014	Brian Daniels	Republican	12,687	66.29	Republican
24	B	Brian Daniels	Republican	2014	Ashley Martinez-Perez	DFL	6,417	33.53	Republican
25	A	Duane Quam	Republican	2010	Duane Quam	Republican	14,479	57.47	Republican
25	A	Duane Quam	Republican	2010	Kim Hicks	DFL	10,692	42.44	Republican
25	B	Duane Sauke	DFL	2016	Liz Boldon	DFL	13,211	58.03	DFL
25	B	Duane Sauke	DFL	2016	Kenneth Bush	Republican	9,522	41.83	DFL
26	A	Tina Liebling	DFL	2004	Tina Liebling	DFL	13,207	63.85	DFL
26	A	Tina Liebling	DFL	2004	Gary Melin	Republican	7,443	35.99	DFL
26	B	Nels Pierson	Republican	2014	Nels Pierson	Republican	13,999	50.60	Republican
26	B	Nels Pierson	Republican	2014	Randy Brock	DFL	13,652	49.34	Republican
27	A	Peggy Bennett	Republican	2014	Peggy Bennett	Republican	13,416	63.43	Republican
27	A	Peggy Bennett	Republican	2014	Thomas Martinez	DFL	7,719	36.49	Republican
27	B	Jeanne Poppe	DFL	2004	Patricia Mueller	Republican	9,907	51.53	Republican
27	B	Jeanne Poppe	DFL	2004	Jeanne Poppe	DFL	9,295	48.35	Republican
28	A	Gene Pelowski	DFL	1986	Gene Pelowski	DFL	15,167	95.98	DFL
28	B	Greg Davids	Republican	1991 (Note: Elected in a special election. Lost re-election in 2006. Elected again in 2008.)	Greg Davids	Republican	14,711	63.67	Republican
28	B	Greg Davids	Republican	1991	Jordan Fontenello	DFL	8,344	36.11	Republican
29	A	Joe McDonald	Republican	2010	Joe McDonald	Republican	17,823	70.29	Republican
29	A	Joe McDonald	Republican	2010	Renée Cardarelle	DFL	7,499	29.57	Republican
29	B	Marion O'Neill	Republican	2012	Marion O'Neill	Republican	14,290	62.95	Republican
29	B	Marion O'Neill	Republican	2012	Joe Rosh	DFL	8,373	36.88	Republican
30	A	Paul Novotny	Republican	2020	Paul Novotny	Republican	16,154	66.23	Republican
30	A	Paul Novotny	Republican	2020	Chad Hobot	DFL	8,219	33.70	Republican
30	B	Eric Lucero	Republican	2014	Eric Lucero	Republican	17,745	65.92	Republican
30	B	Eric Lucero	Republican	2014	Brad Kovach	DFL	9,132	33.92	Republican
31	A	Kurt Daudt	Republican	2010	Kurt Daudt	Republican	17,960	72.84	Republican
31	A	Kurt Daudt	Republican	2010	Brad Brown	DFL	6,664	27.03	Republican
31	B	Cal Bahr	Republican	2016	Cal Bahr	Republican	17,447	67.10	Republican
31	B	Cal Bahr	Republican	2016	Sue Larson	DFL	8,532	32.81	Republican
32	A	Brian Johnson	Republican	2012	Brian Johnson	Republican	16,381	68.20	Republican
32	A	Brian Johnson	Republican	2012	Renae Berg	DFL	7,607	31.67	Republican
32	B	Anne Neu	Republican	2017	Anne Neu	Republican	15,385	62.13	Republican
32	B	Anne Neu	Republican	2017	Katie Malchow	DFL	9,353	37.77	Republican
33	A	Jerry Hertaus	Republican	2012	Jerry Hertaus	Republican	17,660	58.04	Republican
33	A	Jerry Hertaus	Republican	2012	Caitlin Cahill	DFL	12,755	41.92	Republican
33	B	Kelly Morrison	DFL	2018	Kelly Morrison	DFL	14,202	50.52	DFL
33	B	Kelly Morrison	DFL	2018	Andrew Myers	Republican	13,889	49.41	DFL
34	A	Kristin Robbins	Republican	2018	Kristin Robbins	Republican	16,555	57.83	Republican
34	A	Kristin Robbins	Republican	2018	Brian Raines	DFL	12,056	42.11	Republican
34	B	Kristin Bahner	DFL	2018	Kristin Bahner	DFL	15,337	53.65	DFL
34	B	Kristin Bahner	DFL	2018	Dori Trossen	Republican	13,232	46.29	DFL
35	A	John Heinrich	Republican	2018	John Heinrich	Republican	13,525	56.12	Republican
35	A	John Heinrich	Republican	2018	Mike Erickson	DFL	10,559	43.82	Republican
35	B	Peggy Scott	Republican	2008	Peggy Scott	Republican	15,385	60.17	Republican
35	B	Peggy Scott	Republican	2008	Jason Ruffalo	DFL	10,170	39.77	Republican
36	A	Zack Stephenson	DFL	2018	Zack Stephenson	DFL	12,419	51.32	DFL
36	A	Zack Stephenson	DFL	2018	Bill Maresh	Republican	11,744	48.53	DFL
36	B	Melissa Hortman	DFL	2004	Melissa Hortman	DFL	15,076	60.45	DFL
36	B	Melissa Hortman	DFL	2004	Scott Simmons	Republican	9,828	39.41	DFL
37	A	Erin Koegel	DFL	2016	Erin Koegel	DFL	12,389	55.10	DFL
37	A	Erin Koegel	DFL	2016	Ken Wendling	Republican	10,070	44.78	DFL
37	B	Nolan West	Republican	2016	Nolan West	Republican	14,328	52.40	Republican
37	B	Nolan West	Republican	2016	Amir Malik	DFL	12,984	47.48	Republican
38	A	Linda Runbeck	Republican	1989 (Note: Elected in a special election. Did not seek re-election in 1992 in order to seek election to the Minnesota Senate. Did not seek re-election to the Senate in 2000. Elected again to the House in 2010.)	Donald Raleigh	Republican	13,843	53.61	Republican
38	A	Linda Runbeck	Republican	1989	Kris Fredrick	DFL	11,960	46.31	Republican
38	B	Ami Wazlawik	DFL	2018	Ami Wazlawik	DFL	13,906	50.12	DFL
38	B	Ami Wazlawik	DFL	2018	Elliott Engen	Republican	13,807	49.76	DFL
39	A	Bob Dettmer	Republican	2006	Bob Dettmer	Republican	15,499	57.84	Republican
39	A	Bob Dettmer	Republican	2006	Ann Mozey	DFL	11,275	42.08	Republican
39	B	Shelly Christensen	DFL	2018	Shelly Christensen	DFL	14,018	50.39	DFL
39	B	Shelly Christensen	DFL	2018	Joe Garofalo	Republican	13,781	49.54	DFL
40	A	Mike Nelson	DFL	2002	Mike Nelson	DFL	11,775	72.90	DFL
40	A	Mike Nelson	DFL	2002	David True	Republican	4,348	26.92	DFL
40	B	Samantha Vang	DFL	2018	Samantha Vang	DFL	11,370	62.79	DFL
40	B	Samantha Vang	DFL	2018	Charlotte Smith	Republican	4,574	25.26	DFL
40	B	Samantha Vang	DFL	2018	Mary O'Connor	LMN	2,147	11.86	DFL
41	A	Connie Bernardy	DFL	2000 (Note: Did not seek re-election in 2006. Elected again in 2012.)	Connie Bernardy	DFL	14,208	64.05	DFL
41	A	Connie Bernardy	DFL	2000	Susan Erickson	Republican	7,937	35.78	DFL
41	B	Mary Kunesh-Podein	DFL	2016	Sandra Feist	DFL	15,958	70.51	DFL
41	B	Mary Kunesh-Podein	DFL	2016	Ronald Vogel	Republican	6,647	29.37	DFL
42	A	Kelly Moller	DFL	2018	Kelly Moller	DFL	14,981	60.72	DFL
42	A	Kelly Moller	DFL	2018	Candy Sina	Republican	9,659	39.15	DFL
42	B	Jamie Becker-Finn	DFL	2016	Jamie Becker-Finn	DFL	15,950	61.97	DFL
42	B	Jamie Becker-Finn	DFL	2016	Sue Finney	Republican	9,750	37.88	DFL
43	A	Peter Fischer	DFL	2012	Peter Fischer	DFL	14,492	60.69	DFL
43	A	Peter Fischer	DFL	2012	Paul Babin	Republican	9,357	39.19	DFL
43	B	Leon Lillie	DFL	2004	Leon Lillie	DFL	12,651	56.70	DFL
43	B	Leon Lillie	DFL	2004	Jordan Herzog	Republican	8,330	37.33	DFL
43	B	Leon Lillie	DFL	2004	Antonio Nerios	Veterans	1,309	5.87	DFL
44	A	Ginny Klevorn	DFL	2018	Ginny Klevorn	DFL	17,644	59.63	DFL
44	A	Ginny Klevorn	DFL	2018	Perry Nouis	Republican	11,929	40.32	DFL
44	B	Patty Acomb	DFL	2018	Patty Acomb	DFL	17,340	62.29	DFL
44	B	Patty Acomb	DFL	2018	Gary Porter	Republican	10,480	37.65	DFL
45	A	Lyndon Carlson	DFL	1972	Cedrick Frazier	DFL	13,870	63.08	DFL
45	A	Lyndon Carlson	DFL	1972	Jesse Pfliger	Republican	8,086	36.77	DFL
45	B	Mike Freiberg	DFL	2012	Mike Freiberg	DFL	17,929	70.63	DFL
45	B	Mike Freiberg	DFL	2012	Ken Fitzgerald	Republican	7,430	29.27	DFL
46	A	Ryan Winkler	DFL	2006 (Note: Resigned effective on July 1, 2015. Elected again in 2018.)	Ryan Winkler	DFL	18,702	69.71	DFL
46	A	Ryan Winkler	DFL	2006	Anne Taylor	Republican	8,103	30.20	DFL
46	B	Cheryl Youakim	DFL	2014	Cheryl Youakim	DFL	18,731	73.66	DFL
46	B	Cheryl Youakim	DFL	2014	Melissa Moore	Republican	6,670	26.23	DFL
47	A	Jim Nash	Republican	2014	Jim Nash	Republican	19,267	67.35	Republican
47	A	Jim Nash	Republican	2014	Arlan Brinkmeier	DFL	9,308	32.54	Republican
47	B	Greg Boe	Republican	2018	Greg Boe	Republican	14,172	51.54	Republican
47	B	Greg Boe	Republican	2018	Dan Kessler	DFL	13,290	48.33	Republican
48	A	Laurie Pryor	DFL	2016	Laurie Pryor	DFL	16,348	60.91	DFL
48	A	Laurie Pryor	DFL	2016	Eric Wessels	Republican	10,478	39.04	DFL
48	B	Carlie Kotyza-Witthuhn	DFL	2018	Carlie Kotyza-Witthuhn	DFL	13,410	55.00	DFL
48	B	Carlie Kotyza-Witthuhn	DFL	2018	Holly Link	Republican	10,962	44.96	DFL
49	A	Heather Edelson	DFL	2018	Heather Edelson	DFL	20,306	95.62	DFL
49	B	Steve Elkins	DFL	2018	Steve Elkins	DFL	17,883	62.22	DFL
49	B	Steve Elkins	DFL	2018	Joe Thalman	Republican	10,836	37.70	DFL
50	A	Michael Howard	DFL	2018	Michael Howard	DFL	14,626	68.53	DFL
50	A	Michael Howard	DFL	2018	Tim Johnson	Republican	6,692	31.35	DFL
50	B	Andrew Carlson	DFL	2016	Andrew Carlson	DFL	15,504	63.17	DFL
50	B	Andrew Carlson	DFL	2016	Gary Heyer	Republican	9,021	36.75	DFL
51	A	Sandra Masin	DFL	2006 (Note: Lost re-election in 2010. Elected again in 2012.)	Sandra Masin	DFL	14,566	61.76	DFL
51	A	Sandra Masin	DFL	2006	Patrick Zurick	Republican	8,976	38.06	DFL
51	B	Laurie Halverson	DFL	2012	Liz Reyer	DFL	15,764	60.23	DFL
51	B	Laurie Halverson	DFL	2012	Fern Smith	Republican	10,387	39.68	DFL
52	A	Rick Hansen	DFL	2004	Rick Hansen	DFL	15,704	65.47	DFL
52	A	Rick Hansen	DFL	2004	Mariah de la Paz	Republican	8,243	34.36	DFL
52	B	Ruth Richardson	DFL	2018	Ruth Richardson	DFL	13,653	55.45	DFL
52	B	Ruth Richardson	DFL	2018	Cynthia Lonnquist	Republican	10,947	44.46	DFL
53	A	Tou Xiong	DFL	2018	Tou Xiong	DFL	13,801	59.74	DFL
53	A	Tou Xiong	DFL	2018	William Johnston	Republican	9,276	40.15	DFL
53	B	Steve Sandell	DFL	2018	Steve Sandell	DFL	16,269	53.09	DFL
53	B	Steve Sandell	DFL	2018	Kelly Jahner-Byrne	Republican	14,350	46.83	DFL
54	A	Anne Claflin	DFL	2018	Keith Franke	Republican	12,125	51.42	Republican
54	A	Anne Claflin	DFL	2018	Anne Claflin	DFL	11,428	48.46	Republican
54	B	Tony Jurgens	Republican	2016	Tony Jurgens	Republican	13,176	53.54	Republican
54	B	Tony Jurgens	Republican	2016	Kelsey Waits	DFL	11,402	46.33	Republican
55	A	Brad Tabke	DFL	2018	Erik Mortensen	Republican	10,926	47.41	Republican
55	A	Brad Tabke	DFL	2018	Brad Tabke	DFL	10,372	45.00	Republican
55	A	Brad Tabke	DFL	2018	Ryan Martin	LMN	1,706	7.40	Republican
55	B	Tony Albright	Republican	2012	Tony Albright	Republican	17,128	62.27	Republican
55	B	Tony Albright	Republican	2012	Andrea Nelsen	DFL	10,364	37.68	Republican
56	A	Hunter Cantrell	DFL	2018	Jessica Hanson	DFL	13,166	51.61	DFL
56	A	Hunter Cantrell	DFL	2018	Pam Myhra	Republican	12,316	48.28	DFL
56	B	Alice Mann	DFL	2018	Kaela Berg	DFL	12,070	52.38	DFL
56	B	Alice Mann	DFL	2018	Roz Peterson	Republican	10,945	47.50	DFL
57	A	Robert Bierman	DFL	2018	Robert Bierman	DFL	15,574	55.70	DFL
57	A	Robert Bierman	DFL	2018	Megan Olson	Republican	12,357	44.20	DFL
57	B	John Huot	DFL	2018	John Huot	DFL	14,527	55.02	DFL
57	B	John Huot	DFL	2018	Sandra Jimenez	Republican	11,857	44.91	DFL
58	A	Jon Koznick	Republican	2014	Jon Koznick	Republican	15,172	56.21	Republican
58	A	Jon Koznick	Republican	2014	Erin Preese	DFL	11,800	43.72	Republican
58	B	Pat Garofalo	Republican	2004	Pat Garofalo	Republican	15,220	61.95	Republican
58	B	Pat Garofalo	Republican	2004	Sara Wolf	DFL	9,328	37.97	Republican
59	A	Fue Lee	DFL	2016	Fue Lee	DFL	12,409	74.87	DFL
59	A	Fue Lee	DFL	2016	Marcus Harcus	Grassroots	4,054	24.46	DFL
59	B	Raymond Dehn (Note: Lost primary election for party's nomination.)	DFL	2012	Esther Agbaje	DFL	17,649	74.35	DFL
59	B	Raymond Dehn	DFL	2012	Alan Shilepsky	Republican	4,249	17.90	DFL
59	B	Raymond Dehn	DFL	2012	Lisa Neal-Delgado	Green	1,804	7.60	DFL
60	A	Sydney Jordan	DFL	2020	Sydney Jordan	DFL	20,541	82.39	DFL
60	A	Sydney Jordan	DFL	2020	John Holmberg	Republican	3,635	14.58	DFL
60	A	Sydney Jordan	DFL	2020	Calvin Lee Carpenter	Veterans	721	2.89	DFL
60	B	Mohamud Noor	DFL	2018	Mohamud Noor	DFL	16,754	98.06	DFL
61	A	Frank Hornstein	DFL	2002	Frank Hornstein	DFL	25,755	84.41	DFL
61	A	Frank Hornstein	DFL	2002	Kurtis Fechtmeyer	Republican	4,724	15.48	DFL
61	B	Jamie Long	DFL	2018	Jamie Long	DFL	22,789	83.97	DFL
61	B	Jamie Long	DFL	2018	Lisa Pohlman	Republican	4,329	15.95	DFL
62	A	Hodan Hassan	DFL	2018	Hodan Hassan	DFL	14,332	89.61	DFL
62	A	Hodan Hassan	DFL	2018	Arjun Kataria	Republican	1,618	10.12	DFL
62	B	Aisha Gomez	DFL	2018	Aisha Gomez	DFL	19,121	90.95	DFL
62	B	Aisha Gomez	DFL	2018	Ross Tenneson	Republican	1,872	8.90	DFL
63	A	Jim Davnie	DFL	2000	Jim Davnie	DFL	21,654	82.25	DFL
63	A	Jim Davnie	DFL	2000	Penny Arcos	Republican	2,775	10.54	DFL
63	A	Jim Davnie	DFL	2000	David Wiester	LMN	1,881	7.14	DFL
63	B	Jean Wagenius	DFL	1986	Emma Greenman	DFL	18,980	72.95	DFL
63	B	Jean Wagenius	DFL	1986	Frank Pafko	Republican	4,960	19.06	DFL
63	B	Jean Wagenius	DFL	1986	Dennis Schuller	LMN	2,039	7.84	DFL
64	A	Kaohly Her	DFL	2018	Kaohly Her	DFL	20,605	85.65	DFL
64	A	Kaohly Her	DFL	2018	Sherry Schack	Republican	3,409	14.17	DFL
64	B	Dave Pinto	DFL	2014	Dave Pinto	DFL	20,974	80.38	DFL
64	B	Dave Pinto	DFL	2014	Georgia Dietz	Republican	5,078	19.46	DFL
65	A	Rena Moran	DFL	2010	Rena Moran	DFL	14,236	83.15	DFL
65	A	Rena Moran	DFL	2010	Amy Anderson	Republican	2,840	16.59	DFL
65	B	Carlos Mariani	DFL	1990	Carlos Mariani	DFL	16,466	79.97	DFL
65	B	Carlos Mariani	DFL	1990	Margaret Mary Stokely	Republican	4,080	19.82	DFL
66	A	Alice Hausman	DFL	1989	Alice Hausman	DFL	18,079	74.07	DFL
66	A	Alice Hausman	DFL	1989	Brett Rose	Republican	6,283	25.74	DFL
66	B	John Lesch	DFL	2002	Athena Hollins	DFL	12,860	78.61	DFL
66	B	John Lesch	DFL	2002	Mikki Murray	Republican	3,443	21.05	DFL
67	A	Tim Mahoney	DFL	1998	John Thompson	DFL	10,637	72.50	DFL
67	A	Tim Mahoney	DFL	1998	John Stromenger	Republican	3,935	26.82	DFL
67	B	Jay Xiong	DFL	2018	Jay Xiong	DFL	12,437	75.73	DFL
67	B	Jay Xiong	DFL	2018	Fred Turk	Republican	3,940	23.99	DFL

== See also ==
- 2020 Minnesota Senate election
- 2020 Minnesota elections
- 2018 Minnesota gubernatorial election
- List of Minnesota state legislatures
