= Kaela Berg =

American politician

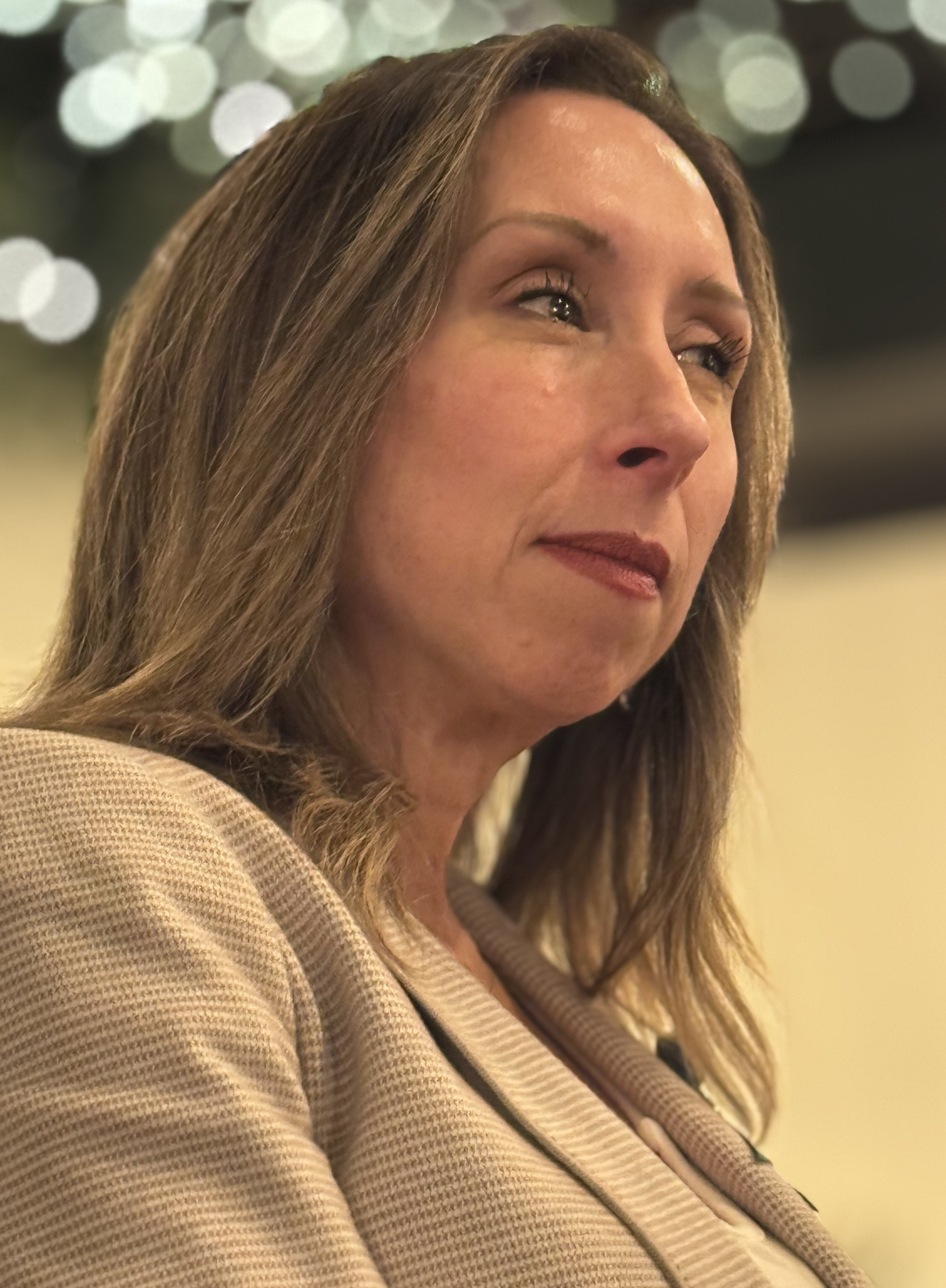

Member of the Minnesota House of Representatives
- Incumbent
- Assumed office January 5, 2021
- Preceded by: Alice Mann
- Constituency: 56B district (2021–2023); 55B district (2023–present)

Personal details
- Born: September 15, 1973 (age 52)
- Party: Democratic
- Children: 2
- Education: Brigham Young University, Idaho
- Website: State House website Campaign website

Kaela Berg (born September 15, 1973) is an American politician serving in the Minnesota House of Representatives since 2021. A member of the Minnesota Democratic Farmer-Labor Party (DFL), Berg represents District 55B in the city of Burnsville, in Dakota County.

== Early life, education and career ==
Berg attended Ricks College (now Brigham Young University–Idaho).

Since 2003, Berg has been a flight attendant for Endeavor Air. She has also worked as a union organizer and representative. She worked as a union steward for United Steelworkers and the Association of Flight Attendants, and as director of the Minnesota Fair Trade coalition.

Berg was a delegate to the 2016 Democratic National Convention for Bernie Sanders, and was critical of Hillary Clinton, saying, "she has blood on her hands." Berg voted for Clinton after Sanders urged delegates to support Clinton to ensure Donald Trump would be defeated.

In October 2025, Berg announced her candidacy for Minnesota's 2nd congressional district.

== Minnesota House of Representatives ==
Berg was elected to the Minnesota House of Representatives in 2020 and was reelected in 2022. She first ran after one-term DFL incumbent Alice Mann announced she would not seek reelection. In the general election, Berg defeated former Republican state representative Roz Peterson, who represented the district before Mann. In 2020, Berg had her election results challenged, but a judge dismissed the case for failing to state a claim and a lack of subject-matter jurisdiction.

Berg is the vice chair of the Labor and Industry Finance and Policy Committee, and sits on the Education Policy and State and Local Government Finance and Policy Committees. She also serves as an assistant majority leader for the DFL House Caucus.

Berg is a member of the Reproductive Freedom Caucus and is pro-choice. In February 2022, in response to high gas prices, she joined other DFL legislators advocating for a temporary repeal of the state gas tax.

== Political positions ==
=== Healthcare ===
During her 2026 congressional run, Berg expressed support for Medicare for all. She advocated creating an "Office for Drug Manufacturing", allowing the government to manufacture its own drugs to increase market supply. She supported more transparency in medical debt collection, regulation of private equity investment in hospitals, and breaking up Big Pharmaceutical companies. Berg opposed RFK Jr.'s cuts to NIH funding.

=== Corporations and corruption ===
In 2026, Berg advocated banning congressional trading, ending corporate PAC election donations, empowering the Federal Election Commission, opposing data center NDAs, and enforcing antitrust law. She refused to take money from AIPAC.

=== Economy and social welfare ===
Berg opposes President Trump's tariffs, corporate price gouging, and clean energy funding cuts. She supports restoring ACA, Medicaid, and SNAP funding; banning corporations from buying single-family homes; expanding down payment assistance for homeowners; preventing renter discrimination; lead screening; and supportive housing for homeless people.

=== Education ===
In 2026, Berg advocated restoring the Department of Education, expanding early childhood education, increasing federal education funding, making college and trade schools affordable, and student loan reform.

=== Gun control ===
Berg advocates instating nationwide background checks for weapons and banning assault weapons.

=== Immigration ===
In her 2026 congressional campaign, Berg said she participated in protests and delivering food for immigrants during Operation Metro Surge. She supports defunding Trump's Immigration Customs and Enforcement (ICE) and advocates increased regulations, body cameras, and transparency for the agency.

=== Israel-Palestine conflict ===
Berg supports cutting all funding for the 2026 Iran war, regulating aid and halting weapons sales to Israel, ending Israeli settlements in the west bank, bringing humanitarian and economic aid to Gaza, and a two-state solution. She has acknowledged the Gaza genocide.

=== LGBTQ rights ===
Berg supports LGBTQ rights, especially protections against the discrimination of transgender people in healthcare, housing, education, the military, and the workplace.

=== Reproductive rights ===
Berg supports repealing the Hyde Amendment, strengthening the Violence Against Women Act, and increasing IVF insurance coverage.

== Personal life ==
Berg lives in Burnsville, Minnesota, and has two children.

== Electoral history ==
2020 Minnesota State House - District 56B
Party	Candidate	Votes	%
Democratic (DFL)	Kaela Berg	12,179	52.31
Republican	Roz Peterson	11,073	47.56
Write-in		30	0.13
Total votes		23,282	100.0
Democratic (DFL) hold			

2022 Minnesota State House - District 55B
Party	Candidate	Votes	%
Democratic (DFL)	Kaela Berg (incumbent)	9,288	58.42
Republican	Van Holston	6,601	41.52
Write-in		11	0.07
Total votes		15,900	100.0
Democratic (DFL) hold			

2024 Minnesota State House - District 55B
Party	Candidate	Votes	%
Democratic (DFL)	Kaela Berg (incumbent)	11,616	59.24
Republican	Van Holston	7,968	40.64
Write-in		24	0.12
Total votes		19,608	100.00
Democratic (DFL) hold			
