= Alice Mann (politician) =

American politician and physician

Member of the Minnesota Senate from the 50th district
- Incumbent
- Assumed office January 3, 2023
- Preceded by: Melissa Halvorson Wiklund

Member of the Minnesota House of Representatives from the 56B district
- In office January 8, 2019 – January 5, 2021
- Preceded by: Roz Peterson
- Succeeded by: Kaela Berg

Personal details
- Born: 1979 or 1980 (age 45–46) Porto Alegre, Rio Grande do Sul, Brazil
- Party: Democratic (DFL)
- Spouse: Elliot
- Children: 3
- Education: Johns Hopkins University (MPH); Meharry Medical College (MD)

Alice Mann (born April 1980) is an American physician and politician from the state of Minnesota. A member of the Minnesota Democratic–Farmer–Labor Party, she has represented district 50 in the Minnesota Senate since 2023. Mann previously represented District 56B in the Minnesota House of Representatives from 2019 to 2021.

== Early life and education ==
Mann and her parents emigrated from Porto Alegre, Brazil to Richfield, Minnesota, when she was eight years old. She attended Johns Hopkins University, graduating with a Master of Public Health, and Meharry Medical College, graduating with a Doctor of Medicine.

== Career ==
Mann completed her residency at Mayo Clinic Health System in La Crosse, Wisconsin. She is a physician practicing family medicine and emergency medicine.

=== Minnesota House of Representatives ===
Mann was first elected to the Minnesota House of Representatives in 2018, defeating Republican incumbent Roz Peterson. She did not run for re-election in the 2020 elections, and was succeeded by Kaela Berg.

=== Minnesota Senate ===
Mann ran for the newly redrawn District 50 of the Minnesota Senate in the 2022 election, an open seat representing Edina and other southwest suburbs of the Twin Cities, some of which retiring senator Melisa López Franzen had previously represented in District 49. She won the seat with 63.42% of the vote, defeating Republican candidate Doug Fulton.

In 2023, Mann was the chief Senate author on a bill written with Rep. Ruth Richardson, authorizing paid family and medical leave. In the 2024 session, she co-authored a law banning shadow noncompete clauses with Rep. Emma Greenman.

== Electoral history ==
2018 Minnesota House of Representatives election - District 56B
Party	Candidate	Votes	%
Democratic (DFL)	Alice Mann	10,035	52.64
Republican	Roz Peterson (incumbent)	9,013	47.28
Write-in		15	0.08
Total votes		19,063	100.0
Democratic (DFL) gain from Republican			

2022 Minnesota Senate election - District 50
Party	Candidate	Votes	%
Democratic (DFL)	Alice Mann	28,575	63.42
Republican	Doug Fulton	16,457	36.53
Write-in		23	0.05
Total votes		45,055	100.0
Democratic (DFL) hold			

== Personal life ==
Mann and her husband, Elliot, have three children. She resides in Edina, Minnesota.
