= Mary Sawatzky =

American politician

Member of the Minnesota House of Representatives from the 17B district
- In office January 8, 2013 – January 5, 2015
- Preceded by: redrawn district
- Succeeded by: Dave Baker

Personal details
- Born: February 7, 1961 (age 65)
- Party: Minnesota Democratic–Farmer–Labor Party
- Spouse: Douglas
- Children: 2
- Education: St. Cloud State University (B.A.)
- Occupation: teacher, legislator

Mary Sawatzky (born February 7, 1961) is a Minnesota politician and former member of the Minnesota House of Representatives. A member of the Minnesota Democratic–Farmer–Labor Party (DFL), she represented District 17B in west-central Minnesota. She is currently teaching as a teacher of the deaf (hard-of-hearing) at Willmar Senior High School in Minnesota.

== Education ==
Sawatzky attended St. Cloud State University, graduating in 1984 with a B.S. in special education and elementary education. She was a special education teacher at New London–Spicer Senior High School from 1985 to 1986. When she left her job later that year, she started working in Willmar Public Schools as a learning disability teacher until 2018.

== Minnesota House of Representatives ==
Sawatzky was first elected to the Minnesota House of Representatives in 2012.

Sawatzky was one of two Democrats in the Minnesota House to vote against a same-sex marriage bill on May 9, 2013. The bill passed 75-59.

== Personal life ==
Sawatzky is married to her husband, Douglas. They have two children and reside in Willmar, Minnesota. She teaches at Willmar Middle School.
