= Eric Lucero =

American politician

Member of the Minnesota Senate from the 30th district
- Incumbent
- Assumed office January 3, 2023

Member of the Minnesota House of Representatives from the 30B district
- In office January 6, 2015 – January 3, 2023
- Preceded by: David FitzSimmons

Personal details
- Born: 1977 or 1978 (age 48–49) West Germany
- Party: Republican
- Spouse: Erum
- Education: Metropolitan State University (B.A.S., B.S.); University of Minnesota (M.B.A.)

Eric Lucero (born 1977/1978) is a Minnesota politician and member of the Minnesota Senate. A member of the Republican Party of Minnesota, he represents District 30. He previously served in the Minnesota House of Representatives, representing District 30B in east-central Minnesota. Lucero was a successful litigant in an October 2020 lawsuit which prohibited the implementation of a seven-day extension for counting absentee ballots received after Election Day, which had been put in place via emergency powers because of the COVID-19 pandemic.

== Early life ==
Lucero attended Metropolitan State University, graduating with a B.A.S. and again with a B.S. He later attended the University of Minnesota, graduating with a M.B.A.

== Minnesota House of Representatives ==
Lucero was first elected to the Minnesota House of Representatives in 2014.

Lucero spoke at a “Storm the Capitol” rally in St. Paul on January 6, 2021, whose attendees cheered the actual storming of the United States Capitol as it was unfolding in real-time.

== Minnesota Senate ==
Lucero was elected to the Minnesota Senate in 2022.

On March 17, 2025, he was one of the five Republican authors of a bill, SF2589, that would designate "Trump Derangement Syndrome" as an officially recognized mental illness in Minnesota.

== Promotion of conspiracy theory ==
In 2024, Lucero was the chief author of proposed Minnesota legislation inspired by the chemtrails conspiracy theory, on the basis of conspiratorial pseudoscience, with references to made-up phenomena like “xenobiotic electromagnetism and fields.”

== Personal life ==
Lucero is married to Erum Lucero. They reside in Dayton, Minnesota.
