= Phyllis Kahn =

American politician (born 1937)

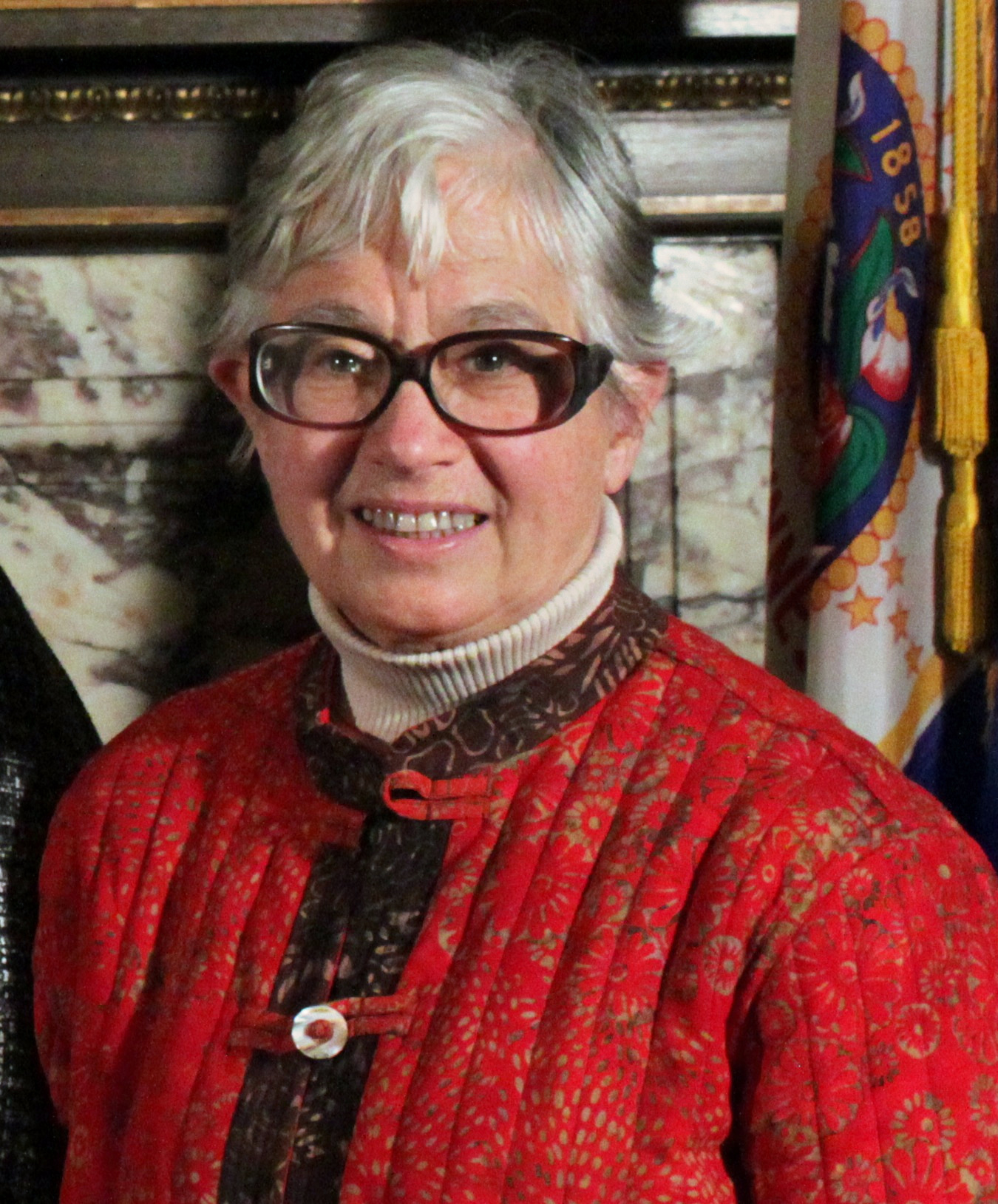
- Kahn in 2012

Member of the Minnesota House of Representatives
- In office January 2, 1973 – January 2, 2017
- Preceded by: redrawn district
- Succeeded by: Ilhan Omar
- Constituency: District 57A (1973‍–‍1983); District 58B (1983‍–‍1993); District 59B (1993‍–‍2013); District 60B (2013‍–‍2017)

Personal details
- Born: Phyllis Lorberblatt; March 23, 1937 (age 89) Brooklyn, New York, U.S.
- Party: Democratic-Farmer-Labor
- Spouse: Donald W. Kahn (m. 1956; died 2015)
- Children: 2
- Education: Cornell University (BA); Yale University (PhD); Harvard University (MPA)
- Occupation: genetics researcher

Phyllis Lorberblatt Kahn (born March 23, 1937) is an American politician and former member of the Minnesota House of Representatives. A member of the Minnesota Democratic–Farmer–Labor Party (DFL), she represented portions of the city of Minneapolis for 44 years. On August 9, 2016, Ilhan Omar defeated Kahn in the DFL primary for District 60B.

== Education and career ==
Kahn received a B.A. in physics from Cornell University and a Ph.D. in biophysics from Yale University. She later received an M.P.A. from Harvard University. She is a retired professor of biophysics.

== Political career ==
She was the chief author and advocate of the 1975 Minnesota Clean Indoor Air Act, one of the first laws enacted anywhere in the world banning the smoking of tobacco in public places. This law has been used as a template for later legislation to protect the public from "secondhand smoke," and was updated and expanded in 2005. In 1989, Kahn proposed reducing the voting age in Minnesota to 12. She said "history has shown us that when a segment of society is denied the right to vote, all the rights of that segment of society are then inferior."

Kahn has also repeatedly advocated for repeal of so-called "Blue Laws," which forbid liquor stores from operating on Sundays and some holidays.

In 2003 she introduced a bill to repeal the ban on first-cousin marriage in Minnesota, but it died in committee. Republican Minority Leader Marty Seifert criticized the bill in response, saying it would "turn us into a cold Arkansas." According to the University of Minnesota's The Wake, Kahn was aware the bill had little chance of passing but introduced it anyway to draw attention to the issue. She reportedly got the idea after learning that cousin marriage is an acceptable form of marriage among some cultural groups that have a strong presence in Minnesota, namely the Hmong and Somali.

She is a longtime advocate for education, health care and medical technology, agriculture and the natural environment, and human rights, particularly for senior citizens and women.

=== Minnesota House of Representatives ===
Kahn was first elected to represent her area of Minneapolis in 1972 and served continuously from then until January 2017. In the August 2016 DFL primary election for District 60B, Kahn finished third of three candidates, so her name was not on the November 2016 ballot.

== Personal life ==
Kahn is Jewish.

Kahn was married to University of Minnesota mathematics professor Donald Kahn for 58 years, until his death in January 2015. Her father-in-law was investor Irving Kahn, who lived to the age of 109.

In 2004, Kahn was charged with theft for removal of Republican campaign literature from doorsteps of several houses. She pleaded guilty and paid a $200 fine.

Kahn lives on Nicollet Island and was a leading opponent of efforts by DeLaSalle High School to construct an athletic field on its campus on Nicollet Island. Ultimately, the school was allowed to build the field.

Kahn once ran a marathon in 3 hours and 17 minutes, and signed up for the 2002 Twin Cities Marathon.
