= David FitzSimmons =

American politician

Member of the Minnesota House of Representatives from the 30B district
- In office January 8, 2013 – January 5, 2015
- Preceded by: redrawn district
- Succeeded by: Eric Lucero

Personal details
- Born: August 4, 1978 (age 47)
- Party: Republican Party of Minnesota
- Children: 1
- Occupation: legislator

David Myles FitzSimmons (born August 4, 1978) is a Minnesota politician and former member of the Minnesota House of Representatives. A member of the Republican Party of Minnesota, he represented District 30B in east-central Minnesota.

== Minnesota House of Representatives ==
FitzSimmons was first elected to the Minnesota House of Representatives in 2012.

On May 9, 2013, FitzSimmons introduced an amendment to add the word "civil" before "marriage" for a gay marriage bill. It was accepted and he was one of only four Republican representatives to vote in favor of the bill. It later passed the House and Senate and subsequently signed by Governor Mark Dayton, legalizing same-sex marriage in Minnesota.

FitzSimmons announced on February 22, 2014 that he would not seek re-election, although he did not rule it out.

== Personal life ==
FitzSimmons is single and has one child. He resides in Albertville, Minnesota.
