= Zach Dorholt =

American politician

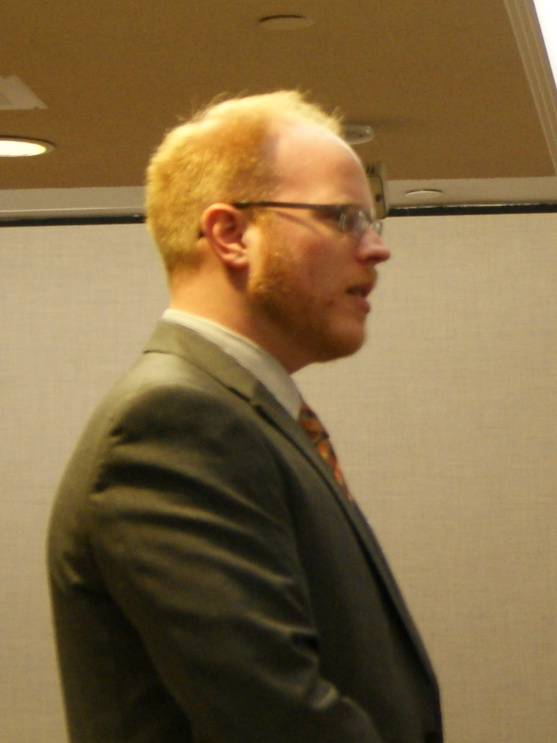

Member of the Minnesota House of Representatives from the 14B district
- In office January 8, 2013 – January 5, 2015
- Preceded by: redrawn district
- Succeeded by: Jim Knoblach

Personal details
- Born: September 1, 1980 (age 46)
- Party: Minnesota Democratic–Farmer–Labor Party
- Children: 3
- Education: St. Cloud State University (B.A., M.S.); Saint Mary's University of Minnesota
- Occupation: counselor, legislator

Zachary "Zach" Dorholt (born September 1, 1980) is a Minnesota politician and member-elect of the Minnesota House of Representatives for district 14B in the Saint Cloud area. A member of the Minnesota Democratic–Farmer–Labor Party (DFL), he previously represented the district from 2013 to 2015.

== Education ==
Dorholt attended St. Cloud State University, graduating with a B.A. in community development and later a M.S. in rehabilitation counseling. He later attended Saint Mary's University of Minnesota, graduating with a graduate certificate in marriage and family therapy.

== Minnesota House of Representatives ==
Dorholt was first elected to the Minnesota House of Representatives in 2012, defeating Republican Representative King Banaian. Dorholt served as vice chair of the Higher Education committee and helped pass funding for all-day kindergarten. He was defeated by Republican Jim Knoblach in 2014 and again in 2016.

Dorholt ran once again for the Minnesota House in 2026 and won, returning to the seat after a 12-year gap.

== ISD 742 School Board ==
Dorholt was elected to the St. Cloud-area ISD 742 School Board in 2018 and reelected in 2022. ISD 742 serves nearly 10,000 students and has over 900 teachers. As of 2025, ISD 742 is Minnesota's 16th-largest school district.

== Personal life ==
Dorholt has three children and resides in St. Cloud, Minnesota.
