= Ernie Leidiger =

American politician (born 1953)

Member of the Minnesota House of Representatives from the 47A district 34A (2011–2013)
- In office January 4, 2011 – January 6, 2015
- Preceded by: Paul Kohls
- Succeeded by: Jim Nash

Personal details
- Born: August 7, 1953 (age 73) Wausau, Wisconsin
- Party: Republican Party of Minnesota
- Children: 3
- Education: United States Naval Academy (B.S.); Salve Regina College (M.S.); Naval War College (M.A); Naval Postgraduate School
- Occupation: small business owner; legislator; veteran

Ernest Gilbert "Ernie" Leidiger (born August 7, 1953) is from Wisconsin. He entered the U.S. Navy in 1971 and was stationed at several facilities and ships throughout his career. He retired as a Naval Officer and established businesses in California and Minnesota. He was a former member of the Minnesota House of Representatives and a member of the Republican Party of Minnesota. He represented District 47A, and subsequently 34A, which includes central and western Carver County in the southern part of the state. He was a former general manager and owner of Brothers Office Furniture, President of Leidiger & Associates, Inc., a media rep firm, and CEO of Operation Homefront, a national non-profit serving Military Families.

== Early life, education, and career ==
Leidiger graduated from Oconomowoc High School in Southern Wisconsin. He joined the U.S. Navy in 1971 and graduated from the United States Naval Academy in Annapolis, Maryland with a B.S. in General Engineering. He subsequently received a M.S. in Management from Salve Regina College in Newport, Rhode Island, then went on to the Naval War College, also in Newport, where he earned his M.A. in National Security and Strategic Planning. He served on several Navy ships as a Surface Warfare Officer, and served on the staff of Central Command during the Persian Gulf War's Operation Desert Storm. He was co-founder of Operation Homefront, a nonprofit organization serving military families of deployed service members. He moved to Minnesota in 2005.

== Minnesota House of Representatives ==
Leidiger served on the Transportation, State Government, Jobs, and Public Safety Committees in the Minnesota House of Representatives. He was active in calling for holding the line on excessive spending in government. Leidiger was recognized by several organizations for his promotion of small businesses, and private sector job creation. He was a member of several transportation corridor working groups.

Leidiger was a leader in promoting jobs in the state, and promoted the second chance coalition for former inmates. He also carried the E-Verify bill to help businesses to quickly establish a perspective workers eligibility to work in the United States. This bill was vetoed by the Democratic Governor.

In May 2011, Leidiger invited Bradlee Dean, head of You Can Run But You Cannot Hide International, to deliver a prayer in front of the Minnesota House of Representatives. Dean was subsequently criticized by members of both parties for his divisive prayer; Leidiger apologized for inviting Dean, stating that it was an "honest mistake" and comparing his position on homosexuality to that of Nazi Germany.

Leidiger was first elected to the House in 2010. In 2012 redistricting reduced the geographical size of the district, removing Scott County and renumbering the district to 47A. On May 15, 2012 Leidiger was endorsed for re-election by the Carver County GOP by acclamation without an opponent being nominated against him. On November 6, 2012, Leidiger was re-elected for a second term with 64% of the vote. He announced on February 5, 2014 that he would not run for re-election in 2014.
