= Jay McNamar =

American politician

Member of the Minnesota House of Representatives from the 12A district
- In office January 8, 2013 – January 5, 2015
- Preceded by: redrawn district
- Succeeded by: Jeff Backer

Personal details
- Born: February 12, 1947 (age 79)
- Party: Minnesota Democratic–Farmer–Labor Party
- Spouse: Robin
- Children: 2
- Education: Ellendale Center–University of North Dakota (B.S.)
- Occupation: Legislator

Jay McNamar (born February 12, 1947) is a Minnesota politician and former member of the Minnesota House of Representatives. A member of the Minnesota Democratic–Farmer–Labor Party (DFL), he represented District 12A in western Minnesota during the 88th session of the Minnesota legislature.

== Education ==
McNamar graduated from Ada High School in Ada, Minnesota. He attended the Ellendale Center–University of North Dakota, graduating with a B.S.

== Minnesota House of Representatives ==
McNamar was first elected to the Minnesota House of Representatives in 2012. He was defeated by Republican Jeff Backer during his campaign for reelection in 2014.

== Personal life ==
McNamar is married to his wife, Robin. They have two children and reside in Elbow Lake, Minnesota, where he served as mayor. He is a retired teacher.
