= Roz Peterson =

American politician, businesswoman, and realtor

Member of the Minnesota House of Representatives from the 56B district
- In office January 6, 2015 – January 7, 2019
- Preceded by: Will Morgan
- Succeeded by: Alice Mann

Personal details
- Born: 1965 (age 60–61)
- Party: Republican Party of Minnesota
- Spouse: Tim (m. 1987)
- Children: 2
- Education: Gustavus Adolphus College (B.A.)
- Occupation: Businesswoman, realtor

Roz Peterson is an American politician, businesswoman, and realtor. She is a former Republican member of the Minnesota House of Representatives, representing District 56B in the southern Twin Cities metropolitan area.

== Early life ==
Peterson attended Gustavus Adolphus College, graduating with a bachelor's degree in 1987. She served on the Lakeville school board prior to being elected to the Minnesota House of Representatives.

== Minnesota House of Representatives ==
Peterson was first elected to the Minnesota House of Representatives in 2014. She had previously sought election in 2012. Peterson served two terms in the Minnesota House, and was defeated by Alice Mann in the 2018 elections. In the 2020 elections, Peterson ran for her previously held District 56B seat, losing to Kaela Berg.

== Personal life ==
Peterson married her husband, Tim, in 1987. They have two children and reside in Lakeville, Minnesota.
