= Will Morgan =

American politician & Educator

Member of the Minnesota House of Representatives from the 56B district
- In office January 8, 2013 – January 5, 2015
- Preceded by: redrawn district
- Succeeded by: Roz Peterson

Member of the Minnesota House of Representatives from the 40A district
- In office January 3, 2007 – January 3, 2011
- Preceded by: Duke Powell
- Succeeded by: Pam Myhra

Personal details
- Born: November 1966 (age 59) Oak Park, Illinois
- Party: Minnesota Democratic–Farmer–Labor Party
- Spouse: Married
- Children: Andrew, Samuel, and Charles
- Education: Carleton College; St. Mary's University
- Occupation: Educator, legislator

Will Morgan (born November 1966) is a Minnesota politician and former member of the Minnesota House of Representatives. A member of the Minnesota Democratic–Farmer–Labor Party (DFL), he represented District 56B, which includes portions of Dakota County in the southern Twin Cities metropolitan area. He is a physics and chemistry teacher at Burnsville High School in Burnsville.

== Minnesota House of Representatives ==
Morgan was first elected in 2006, defeating incumbent Republican Rep. Duke Powell. He was re-elected in 2008, but was unseated by Republican Pam Myhra in the 2010 general election.

On November 6, 2012, Morgan defeated Republican challenger Roz Peterson to return to the Legislature.
