= Pam Myhra =

American politician (born 1957)

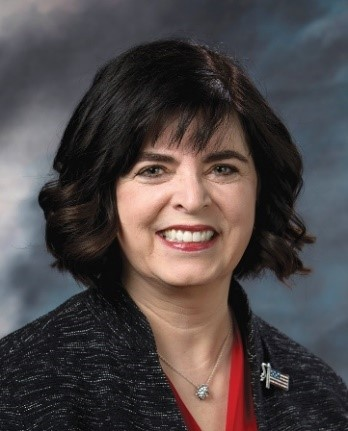

Member of the Minnesota House of Representatives from the 56A district 40A (2011–2013)
- In office January 4, 2011 – January 5, 2015
- Preceded by: Will Morgan
- Succeeded by: Drew Christensen

Personal details
- Born: February 18, 1957 (age 69)
- Party: Republican
- Spouse: Chuck
- Children: 3
- Education: University of St. Thomas, Minnesota (BA)
- Website: Campaign website

Pamela J. Myhra (born 1957) is an American politician and served as a member of the Minnesota House of Representatives during the 87th and 88th legislative sessions. A member of the Republican Party of Minnesota, she represented portions of Dakota and Scott counties in the southern Twin Cities metropolitan area. During her first term representing Minnesota House District 40A; January 4, 2011 to January 7, 2013; Myhra served as a member of the Capital Investment, Education Finance, Education Policy and Tax committees. During her second term representing Minnesota House District 56A; January 8, 2013 to January 5, 2015; Myhra served as the minority lead member on the Early Childhood and Youth Development Policy committee and as a member of the Education Finance and Tax committees. In her second term she was appointed the minority party House legislative liaison to the Minnesota Early Learning Council and to the Minnesota Youth Council.

Myhra is a certified public accountant with an active license.

== Early life, education, and career ==
Myhra is a long-term resident of Burnsville where she graduated from Burnsville High School in 1975. After graduating from the University of St. Thomas in Saint Paul, earning her B.A. with honors in Business Administration, she joined the public accounting firm, KPMG. As a certified public accountant, she specialized in banking, insurance, and government until placing her career on hold to have a family and home educate her three children. Active in her community, she has also served as a director of a girls’ club and teacher of numerous parenting classes.

== Political career ==
Myhra is a graduate of the Minnesota Excellence in Public Service Series, a communication, leadership, and management program for female leaders and, while serving in the Minnesota House of Representatives, was a fellow of the National Conference of State Legislatures Early Learning program and a Council of State Governments Early Childhood Development program participant. Myhra received the "Elected Women of Excellence Award" from the National Foundation of Women Legislators in November 2013.

Myhra was first elected to the District 56A of the House in 2010, and was re-elected in 2012. She did not seek re-election in 2014. Myhra ran as a candidate for Lieutenant Governor of Minnesota as the running mate of GOP gubernatorial candidate, Marty Seifert, who ran for the Republican nomination for Governor of Minnesota. Their ticket was defeated in the Republican primary on August 12, 2014. Myhra opted to run for lieutenant governor, rather than seek re-election to her House seat in 2014. In 2018, Myhra ran for Minnesota State Auditor, but lost to Julie Blaha. In 2020, Myhra ran for her previously held House seat, but narrowly lost to Jessica Hanson. In 2022, she ran for the Minnesota state Senate, but lost to incumbent Lindsey Port.

Party political offices
Preceded by Randy Gilbert	Republican nominee for Minnesota State Auditor; 2018	Succeeded by Ryan Wilson
