= 87th Minnesota Legislature =

2011 to 2012 legislative session

Eighty-seventh Minnesota Legislature
←	86th	88th	→
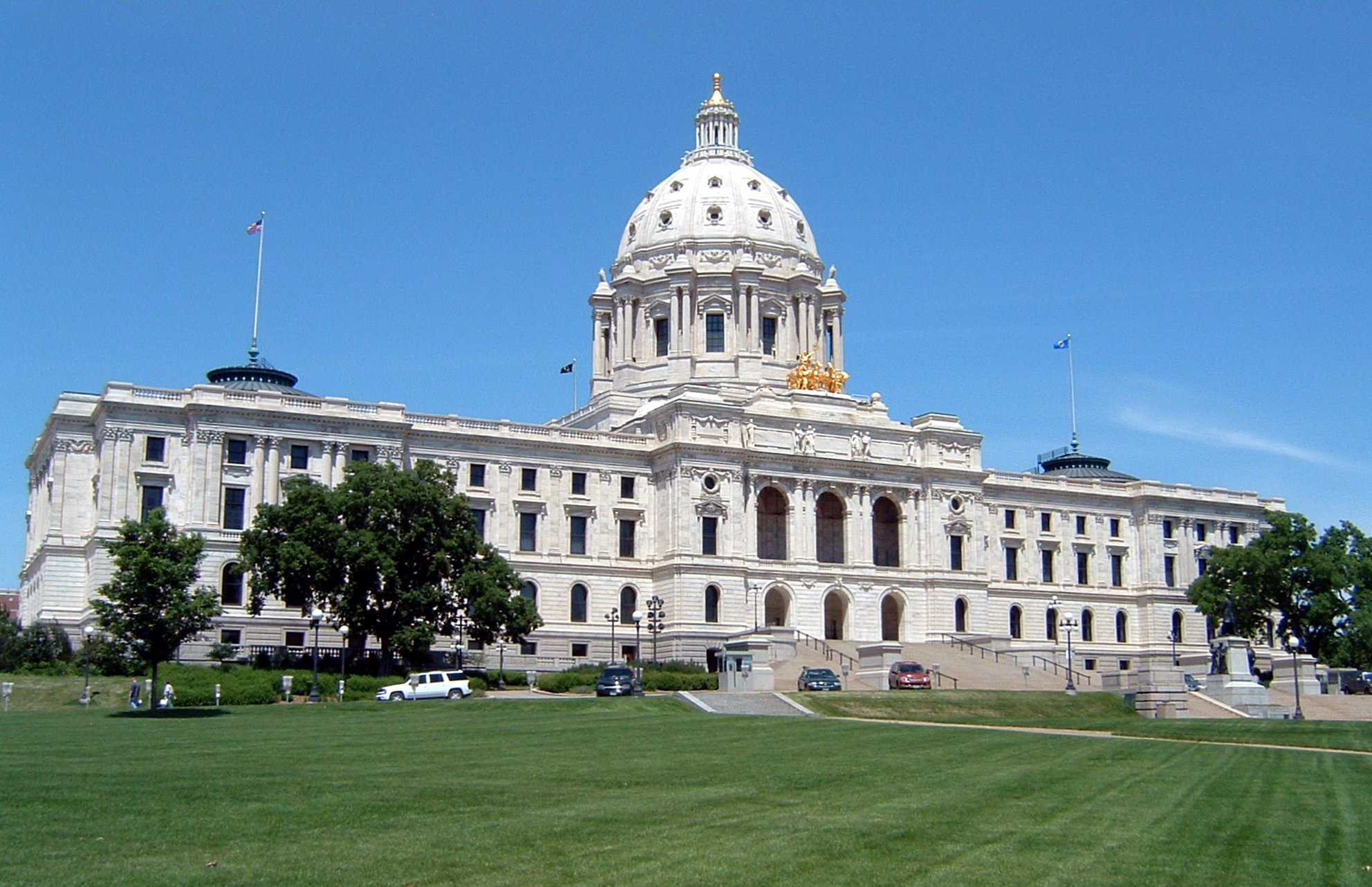
- Minnesota State Capitol

Overview
- Legislative body: Minnesota Legislature
- Term: January 4, 2011 – January 7, 2013
- Election: 2010 General Election

Senate
- Members: 67 senators
- President: Michelle Fischbach (R)
- Majority Leader: Amy Koch (R), David Senjem (R)
- Minority Leader: Tom Bakk (DFL)
- Party control: Republican Party

House of Representatives
- Members: 134 representatives
- Speaker: Kurt Zellers (R)
- Majority Leader: Matt Dean (R)
- Minority Leader: Paul Thissen (DFL)
- Party control: Republican Party

Sessions
- 2011: January 4, 2011 – May 23, 2011
- 2012: January 24, 2012 – May 10, 2012

Special sessions
- 2011, 1st: July 19, 2011 – July 20, 2011
- 2012, 1st: August 24, 2012

The eighty-seventh Minnesota Legislature was the legislature of the U.S. state of Minnesota from January 4, 2011, to January 7, 2013. It was composed of the Senate and the House of Representatives, based on the results of the 2010 Senate election and the 2010 House election. The seats were apportioned based on the 2000 United States census. It first convened in Saint Paul on January 4, 2011 and last met on August 24, 2012. It held its regular session from January 4 to May 23, 2011, and from January 24 to May 10, 2012. A special session was held on July 19 and 20, 2011, to complete the passage of budget bills. Another special session was held on August 24, 2012, to provide disaster assistance for the flooded areas of Duluth.

== Major events ==
- February 9, 2011: 2011 State of the State Address
- February 21, 2011: Joint session to elect regents of the University of Minnesota.
- February 14, 2012: 2012 State of the State Address

== Major legislation ==
The legislation listed here is taken from Hot List 2011 - 2012 Regular Session, which is, according to the website of the Minnesota Legislature "an unofficial listing of House and Senate files that have become somewhat to very well-known." This is not an exhaustive list of bills enacted, proposed, or vetoed during the 87th Minnesota Legislature, but rather a list of well-known legislation.

=== Enacted ===
- May 25, 2011: An act proposing an amendment to the Minnesota Constitution recognizing marriage as only a union between one man and one woman (Laws 2011, chapter 88)
- February 23, 2012: Public safety; requiring community notification when a person is released from the Minnesota sex offender program (Laws 2012, chapter 123)
- April 5, 2012: An act proposing an amendment to the Minnesota Constitution requiring voters to present photographic identification (Laws 2012, chapter 167)
- April 9, 2012: An act authorizing county attorneys and assistant county attorneys to carry firearms on duty under the terms of a permit to carry (Laws 2012, chapter 171)
- April 18, 2012: Revisor Bill (Laws 2012, chapter 187)
- April 27, 2012: Omnibus Liquor Bill (Laws 2012, chapter 235)
- April 27, 2012: Omnibus Education Policy & Finance Bill (Laws 2012, chapter 239)
- April 28, 2012: Omnibus Agriculture Bill (Laws 2012, chapter 244)
- April 28, 2012: Omnibus Health & Human Services Finance Bill (Laws 2012, chapter 247)
- April 30, 2012: Omnibus Health & Human Services Policy Bill (Laws 2012, chapter 253)
- May 1, 2012: Omnibus Legacy Amendment Funding Bill (Laws 2012, chapter 264)
- May 3, 2012: Omnibus Environment Policy Bill (Laws 2012, chapter 272)
- May 3, 2012: Omnibus Game & Fish Bill (Laws 2012, chapter 277)
- May 10, 2012: Omnibus Pension Bill (Laws 2012, chapter 286)
- May 10, 2012: Omnibus Transportation Finance Bill (Laws 2012, chapter 287)
- May 10, 2012: Omnibus Data Practices Bill (Laws 2012, chapter 290)
- May 11, 2012: Omnibus Bonding Bill (Laws 2012, chapter 293)
- May 14, 2012: Omnibus Technical Tax Bill (Laws 2012, chapter 294)
- May 14, 2012: Viking stadium; provides for a National Football League Stadium in Minnesota funded by gambling revenue & more (Laws 2012, chapter 299)
- May 25, 2012: Omnibus Higher Education Bill (Laws 2012, chapter 270)

=== Vetoed ===
Boldface indicates the act was passed by both houses.

- March 5, 2012: Firearms; allows use of firearm in self defense outside the permit holders home (**H.F. No. 1467**/S.F. No. 1357)
- April 5, 2012: Omnibus K-12 Bill (**H.F. No. 2083**/S.F. No. 2492)
- May 3, 2012: Teachers; school districts authorized to base leave of absence and discharge decisions on teacher evaluation outcomes (**H.F. No. 1870**/S.F. No. 1690)
- May 4, 2012: Omnibus Tax Bill (**H.F. No. 2337**/S.F. No. 1972)
- May 14, 2012: Omnibus Tax Bill (pocket veto) (**H.F. No. 247**/S.F. No. 872)

== Summary of actions ==
In the 87th Minnesota Legislature, a total of 258 out of 5,731 bills introduced were passed by the Senate and House of Representatives. All of the bills appearing on the Legislature's Hot List for the 87th Legislature were approved by Governor Mark Dayton, with the notable exceptions of H.F. No. 1467, an act that would have eliminated the duty to retreat with regard to the use of firearms in self-defense and instituted a stand-your-ground law while allowing the use of firearms in self-defense outside the permit holder's home; H.F. No. 2083, the omnibus K-12 bill; H.F. No. 1870, an act that would have authorized school districts to base leave of absence and discharge decisions on teacher evaluation outcomes; H.F. No. 2337, an omnibus tax bill; and H.F. No. 247, another omnibus tax bill, all of which were vetoed, except that H.F. No. 247 was the subject of a pocket veto rather than a regular veto.

In total, 55 acts were vetoed, including 23 passed during the 2011 regular session and 32 passed during the 2012 continuation of the regular session. None of the bills passed during either of the special sessions were vetoed. Two of the 32 vetoes of bills passed during the 2012 continuation were pocket vetoes. There were no line-item vetoes. No acts or items were enacted by the Legislature over the Governor's veto.

== Political composition ==
Resignations and new members are discussed in the "Membership changes" section, below.

=== Senate ===
Senate composition (from September 4, 2012) 37 Republican 29 DFL 1 vacant

	Party (Shading indicates majority caucus)		Total	Vacant
	Democratic–Farmer–Labor	Republican	Total	Vacant
End of previous Legislature	46	21	67	0
Begin	30	37	67	0
March 20, 2011	29	37	66	1
April 12, 2011	30	37	67	0
June 15, 2011	29	37	66	1
August 15, 2011	28	37	65	2
October 18, 2011	30	37	67	0
November 7, 2011	29	37	66	1
January 10, 2012	30	37	67	0
March 2, 2012	29	37	66	1
April 10, 2012	30	37	67	0
September 4, 2012	29	37	66	1
Latest voting share	44%	56%		
Beginning of the next Legislature	39	28	67	0

=== House of Representatives ===
House composition (from April 10, 2012) 72 Republican 61 DFL 1 vacant

	Party (Shading indicates majority caucus)		Total	Vacant
	Democratic–Farmer–Labor	Republican	Total	Vacant
End of previous Legislature	87	47	134	0
Begin	62	72	134	0
January 13, 2011	61	72	133	1
February 22, 2011	62	72	134	0
October 18, 2011	61	72	133	1
January 10, 2012	62	72	134	0
April 10, 2012	61	72	133	1
Latest voting share	46%	55%		
Beginning of the next Legislature	72	60	132	2

== Leadership ==
=== Senate ===
- President: Michelle Fischbach (R)
- President pro tempore: Gen Olson (R)

==== Majority (Republican) leadership ====
- Majority Leader:
  - Amy Koch (until December 15, 2011)
  - David Senjem (from December 27, 2011)
- Deputy Majority Leader:
  - Geoff Michel (until December 27, 2011)
  - Julianne Ortman (from January 3, 2012)
- Assistant Majority Leaders:
  - Roger Chamberlain (from December 27, 2011)
  - Paul Gazelka (from December 27, 2011)
  - David Hann (until December 27, 2011)
  - Bill Ingebrigtsen (from January 3, 2012)
  - Ted Lillie (from December 27, 2011)
  - Doug Magnus (until December 27, 2011)
  - Claire Robling (from December 27, 2011)
  - David Senjem (until December 27, 2011)
  - Dave Thompson (until December 27, 2011)
- Majority Whip:
  - Chris Gerlach (until December 27, 2011)
  - Ted Lillie (2012)
- Assistant Majority Whips (2012):
  - John Carlson
  - Al DeKruif
  - Carla Nelson
  - Pam Wolf

==== Minority (DFL) leadership ====
- Minority Leader: Tom Bakk
- Assistant Minority Leader: Terri Bonoff

=== House of Representatives ===
- Speaker: Kurt Zellers (R)
- Speakers pro tempore:
  - Greg Davids (R)
  - Mary Liz Holberg (R)
  - Morrie Lanning (R)
  - Torrey Westrom (R)

==== Majority (Republican) leadership ====
- Majority Leader: Matt Dean
- Assistant Majority Leaders:
  - Kurt Daudt
  - Bob Gunther
  - Joe Hoppe
  - Tim Kelly
  - Jenifer Loon
  - Paul Torkelson
  - Tim Sanders
  - Ron Shimanski
- Majority Whip: Rod Hamilton

==== Minority (DFL) leadership ====
- Minority Leader: Paul Thissen
- Deputy Minority Leader: Debra Hilstrom
- Assistant Minority Leaders:
  - Kent Eken
  - Rick Hansen
  - Jeff Hayden (until October 25, 2011)
  - Erin Murphy
  - Kim Norton
  - John Persell
  - Steve Simon
- Minority Whips:
  - Melissa Hortman
  - Larry Hosch
  - John Lesch
  - Terry Morrow

== Members ==
=== Senate ===
Senate districts by political party affiliation DFL Republican

District	Name	Party	Residence	First elected
1	LeRoy A. Stumpf	DFL	Plummer	1982
2	Rod Skoe	DFL	Clearbrook	2002
3	Tom Saxhaug	DFL	Grand Rapids	2002
4	John Carlson	Republican	Bemidji	2010
5	Dave Tomassoni	DFL	Chisholm	2000
6	Tom Bakk	DFL	Cook	2002
7	Roger Reinert	DFL	Duluth	2010
8	Tony Lourey	DFL	Kerrick	2006
9	Keith Langseth	DFL	Glyndon	1980
10	Gretchen Hoffman	Republican	Vergas	2010
11	Bill Ingebrigtsen	Republican	Alexandria	2006
12	Paul Gazelka	Republican	Brainerd	2010
13	Joe Gimse	Republican	Willmar	2006
14	Michelle Fischbach	Republican	Paynesville	1996*
15	John Pederson	Republican	St. Cloud	2010
16	Dave Brown	Republican	Becker	2010
17	Sean Nienow	Republican	Cambridge	2002, 2010†
18	Scott Newman	Republican	Hutchinson	2010
19	Amy Koch	Republican	Buffalo	2006*
20	Gary Kubly (died March 2, 2012)	DFL	Granite Falls	2002
20	Lyle Koenen (from April 18, 2012)	DFL	Clara City	2012*
21	Gary Dahms	Republican	Redwood Falls	2010
22	Doug Magnus	Republican	Slayton	2010
23	Kathy Sheran	DFL	Mankato	2006
24	Julie Rosen	Republican	Fairmont	2002
25	Al DeKruif	Republican	Madison Lake	2010
26	Mike Parry	Republican	Waseca	2010*
27	Dan Sparks	DFL	Austin	2002
28	John Howe	Republican	Red Wing	2010
29	David Senjem	Republican	Rochester	2002
30	Carla Nelson	Republican	Rochester	2010
31	Jeremy Miller	Republican	Winona	2010
32	Warren Limmer	Republican	Maple Grove	1994*
33	Gen Olson	Republican	Minnetrista	1982
34	Julianne Ortman	Republican	Chanhassen	2002
35	Claire Robling	Republican	Jordan	1996
36	Dave Thompson	Republican	Lakeville	2010
37	Chris Gerlach	Republican	Apple Valley	2004*
38	Ted Daley	Republican	Eagan	2010
39	James Metzen	DFL	South Saint Paul	1986
40	Dan Hall	Republican	Burnsville	2010
41	Geoff Michel	Republican	Edina	2002
42	David Hann	Republican	Eden Prairie	2002
43	Terri Bonoff	DFL	Hopkins	2004*
44	Ron Latz	DFL	St. Louis Park	2006
45	Ann Rest	DFL	New Hope	2000
46	Linda Scheid (died June 15, 2011)	DFL	Brooklyn Park	1976
46	Chris Eaton (from October 28, 2011)	DFL	Brooklyn Center	2011*
47	Benjamin Kruse	Republican	Brooklyn Park	2010
48	Mike Jungbauer	Republican	East Bethel	2002
49	Michelle Benson	Republican	Ham Lake	2010
50	Barb Goodwin	DFL	Columbia Heights	2010
51	Pam Wolf	Republican	Spring Lake Park	2010
52	Ray Vandeveer	Republican	Forest Lake	2006
53	Roger Chamberlain	Republican	Lino Lakes	2010
54	John Marty	DFL	Roseville	1986
55	Charles Wiger	DFL	Maplewood	1996
56	Ted Lillie	Republican	Lake Elmo	2010
57	Katie Sieben	DFL	Newport	2006
58	Linda Higgins	DFL	Minneapolis	1996
59	Larry Pogemiller (until November 7, 2011)	DFL	Minneapolis	1982
59	Kari Dziedzic (from January 20, 2012)	DFL	Minneapolis	2012*
60	D. Scott Dibble	DFL	Minneapolis	2002
61	Linda Berglin (until August 15, 2011)	DFL	Minneapolis	1980
61	Jeff Hayden (from October 25, 2011)	DFL	Minneapolis	2011*
62	Patricia Torres Ray	DFL	Minneapolis	2006
63	Ken Kelash	DFL	Minneapolis	2008*
64	Dick Cohen	DFL	Saint Paul	1986
65	Sandy Pappas	DFL	Saint Paul	1990
66	Ellen Anderson (until March 20, 2011)	DFL	Saint Paul	1992
66	Mary Jo McGuire (from April 18, 2011)	DFL	Falcon Heights	2011*
67	John Harrington (until September 4, 2012)	DFL	Saint Paul	2010

*Elected in a special election.
†Elected to non-consecutive terms.

=== House of Representatives ===
House districts by political party affiliation DFL Republican

District	Name	Party	Residence	First elected
1A	Dan Fabian	Republican	Roseau	2010
1B	Deb Kiel	Republican	Crookston	2010
2A	Kent Eken	DFL	Twin Valley	2002
2B	Dave Hancock	Republican	Bemidji	2010
3A	Tom Anzelc	DFL	Balsam Township	2006
3B	Carolyn McElfatrick	Republican	Deer River	2010
4A	John Persell	DFL	Bemidji	2008
4B	Larry Howes	Republican	Walker	1998
5A	Tom Rukavina	DFL	Virginia	1986
5B	Anthony Sertich (until January 13, 2011)	DFL	Chisholm	2000
5B	Carly Melin (from February 22, 2011)	DFL	Hibbing	2011*
6A	David Dill	DFL	Crane Lake	2002
6B	Mary Murphy	DFL	Hermantown	1976
7A	Thomas Huntley	DFL	Duluth	1992
7B	Kerry Gauthier	DFL	Duluth	2010
8A	Bill Hilty	DFL	Finlayson	1996
8B	Roger Crawford	Republican	Mora	2010
9A	Morrie Lanning	Republican	Moorhead	2002
9B	Paul Marquart	DFL	Dilworth	2000
10A	Bud Nornes	Republican	Fergus Falls	1996
10B	Mark Murdock	Republican	Ottertail	2008
11A	Torrey Westrom	Republican	Elbow Lake	1996
11B	Mary Franson	Republican	Alexandria	2010
12A	John Ward	DFL	Brainerd	2006
12B	Mike LeMieur	Republican	Little Falls	2010
13A	Paul Anderson	Republican	Starbuck	2008
13B	Bruce Vogel	Republican	Willmar	2010
14A	Tim O'Driscoll	Republican	Sartell	2010
14B	Larry Hosch	DFL	Saint Joseph	2004
15A	Steve Gottwalt	Republican	Saint Cloud	2006
15B	King Banaian	Republican	Saint Cloud	2010
16A	Sondra Erickson	Republican	Princeton	1998*, 2010†
16B	Mary Kiffmeyer	Republican	Big Lake	2008
17A	Kurt Daudt	Republican	Crown	2010
17B	Bob Barrett	Republican	Shafer	2010
18A	Ron Shimanski	Republican	Silver Lake	2006
18B	Dean Urdahl	Republican	Grove City	2002
19A	Bruce Anderson	Republican	Buffalo Township	1994
19B	Joe McDonald	Republican	Delano	2010
20A	Andrew Falk	DFL	Murdock	2008
20B	Lyle Koenen (until April 17, 2012)	DFL	Clara City	2002
21A	Chris Swedzinski	Republican	Ghent	2010
21B	Paul Torkelson	Republican	St. James	2008
22A	Joe Schomacker	Republican	Luverne	2010
22B	Rod Hamilton	Republican	Mountain Lake	2004
23A	Terry Morrow	DFL	Saint Peter	2006
23B	Kathy Brynaert	DFL	Mankato	2006
24A	Bob Gunther	Republican	Fairmont	1995*
24B	Tony Cornish	Republican	Good Thunder	2002
25A	Glenn Gruenhagen	Republican	Glencoe	2010
25B	Kelby Woodard	Republican	Belle Plaine	2010
26A	Kory Kath	DFL	Owatonna	2008
26B	Patti Fritz	DFL	Faribault	2004
27A	Rich Murray	Republican	Albert Lea	2010
27B	Jeanne Poppe	DFL	Austin	2004
28A	Tim Kelly	Republican	Red Wing	2008
28B	Steve Drazkowski	Republican	Wabasha	2007*
29A	Duane Quam	Republican	Byron	2010
29B	Kim Norton	DFL	Rochester	2006
30A	Tina Liebling	DFL	Rochester	2004
30B	Mike Benson	Republican	Rochester	2010
31A	Gene Pelowski	DFL	Winona	1986
31B	Greg Davids	Republican	Preston	1991*, 2008†
32A	Joyce Peppin	Republican	Rogers	2004
32B	Kurt Zellers	Republican	Maple Grove	2003*
33A	Steve Smith	Republican	Mound	1990
33B	Connie Doepke	Republican	Wayzata	2008
34A	Ernie Leidiger	Republican	Mayer	2010
34B	Joe Hoppe	Republican	Chaska	2002
35A	Michael Beard	Republican	Shakopee	2002
35B	Mark Buesgens	Republican	Jordan	1998
36A	Mary Liz Holberg	Republican	Lakeville	1998
36B	Pat Garofalo	Republican	Farmington	2004
37A	Tara Mack	Republican	Apple Valley	2008
37B	Kurt Bills	Republican	Rosemount	2010
38A	Diane Anderson	Republican	Eagan	2010
38B	Doug Wardlow	Republican	Eagan	2010
39A	Rick Hansen	DFL	South Saint Paul	2004
39B	Joe Atkins	DFL	Inver Grove Heights	2002
40A	Pam Myhra	Republican	Burnsville	2010
40B	Ann Lenczewski	DFL	Bloomington	1998
41A	Keith Downey	Republican	Edina	2008
41B	Pat Mazorol	Republican	Bloomington	2010
42A	Kirk Stensrud	Republican	Eden Prairie	2010
42B	Jenifer Loon	Republican	Eden Prairie	2008
43A	Sarah Anderson	Republican	Plymouth	2006
43B	John Benson	DFL	Minnetonka	2006
44A	Steve Simon	DFL	St. Louis Park	2004
44B	Ryan Winkler	DFL	Golden Valley	2006
45A	Sandra Peterson	DFL	New Hope	2004
45B	Lyndon Carlson	DFL	Brooklyn Center	1972
46A	Michael Nelson	DFL	Brooklyn Park	2002
46B	Debra Hilstrom	DFL	Brooklyn Center	2000
47A	Denise Dittrich	DFL	Champlin	2004
47B	Melissa Hortman	DFL	Brooklyn Park	2004
48A	Tom Hackbarth	Republican	Cedar	1994, 1998†
48B	Jim Abeler	Republican	Anoka	1998
49A	Peggy Scott	Republican	Andover	2008
49B	Branden Petersen	Republican	Andover	2010
50A	Carolyn Laine	DFL	Columbia Heights	2006
50B	Kate Knuth	DFL	New Brighton	2006
51A	Tim Sanders	Republican	Blaine	2008
51B	Tom Tillberry	DFL	Fridley	2006
52A	Bob Dettmer	Republican	Forest Lake	2006
52B	Matt Dean	Republican	Dellwood	2004
53A	Linda Runbeck	Republican	Circle Pines	1989*, 2010†
53B	Carol McFarlane	Republican	White Bear Lake	2006
54A	Mindy Greiling	DFL	Roseville	1992
54B	Bev Scalze	DFL	Little Canada	2004
55A	Leon Lillie	DFL	North Saint Paul	2004
55B	Nora Slawik	DFL	Maplewood	1996, 2000†
56A	Kathy Lohmer	Republican	Lake Elmo	2010
56B	Andrea Kieffer	Republican	Woodbury	2010
57A	John Kriesel	Republican	Cottage Grove	2010
57B	Denny McNamara	Republican	Hastings	2002
58A	Joe Mullery	DFL	Minneapolis	1996
58B	Bobby Joe Champion	DFL	Minneapolis	2008
59A	Diane Loeffler	DFL	Minneapolis	2004
59B	Phyllis Kahn	DFL	Minneapolis	1972
60A	Marion Greene	DFL	Minneapolis	2010
60B	Frank Hornstein	DFL	Minneapolis	2002
61A	Karen Clark	DFL	Minneapolis	1980
61B	Jeff Hayden (until October 25, 2011)	DFL	Minneapolis	2008
61B	Susan Allen (from January 19, 2012)	DFL	Minneapolis	2012*
62A	Jim Davnie	DFL	Minneapolis	2000
62B	Jean Wagenius	DFL	Minneapolis	1986
63A	Paul Thissen	DFL	Minneapolis	2002
63B	Linda Slocum	DFL	Richfield	2006
64A	Erin Murphy	DFL	Saint Paul	2006
64B	Michael Paymar	DFL	Saint Paul	1996
65A	Rena Moran	DFL	Saint Paul	2010
65B	Carlos Mariani	DFL	Saint Paul	1990
66A	John Lesch	DFL	Saint Paul	2002
66B	Alice Hausman	DFL	Saint Paul	1989*
67A	Tim Mahoney	DFL	Saint Paul	1998
67B	Sheldon Johnson	DFL	Saint Paul	2000

*Elected in a special election.
†Elected to non-consecutive terms.

== Membership changes ==
=== Senate ===
District	Vacated by	Reason for change	Successor	Date successor seated
66	Ellen Anderson (DFL)	Resigned March 20, 2011 to chair the Minnesota Public Utilities Commission.	Mary Jo McGuire (DFL)	April 18, 2011
46	Linda Scheid (DFL)	Died of ovarian cancer June 15, 2011.	Chris Eaton (DFL)	October 28, 2011
61	Linda Berglin (DFL)	Resigned August 15, 2011, to accept a position as a health policy program manager with Hennepin County.	Jeff Hayden (DFL)	October 25, 2011
59	Larry Pogemiller (DFL)	Resigned November 7, 2011 to become Director of the Minnesota Office of Higher Education.	Kari Dziedzic (DFL)	January 20, 2012
20	Gary Kubly (DFL)	Died of Lou Gehrig's disease March 2, 2012.	Lyle Koenen (DFL)	April 18, 2012
67	John Harrington (DFL)	Resigned September 4, 2012 to become Metro Transit Police Chief.	Remained vacant	

=== House of Representatives ===
District	Vacated by	Reason for change	Successor	Date successor seated
5B	Anthony Sertich (DFL)	Resigned January 13, 2011 to become the Commissioner of the Iron Range Resources and Rehabilitation Board.	Carly Melin (DFL)	February 22, 2011
61B	Jeff Hayden (DFL)	Elected to the Minnesota State Senate in special election on October 18, 2011.	Susan Allen (DFL)	January 19, 2012
20B	Lyle Koenen (DFL)	Elected to the Minnesota State Senate in special election on April 10, 2012.	Remained vacant	

Preceded by Eighty-sixth Minnesota Legislature	Eighty-seventh Minnesota Legislature; 2011—2012	Succeeded by Eighty-eighth Minnesota Legislature
