= 2016 Minnesota House of Representatives election =

- November 8, 2016

All 134 seats in the Minnesota House of Representatives 68 seats needed for a majority
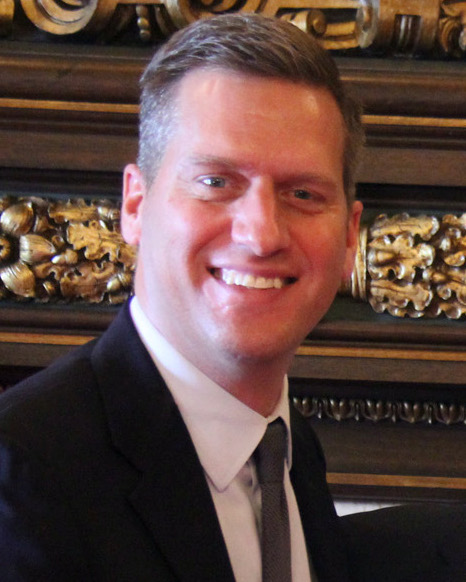

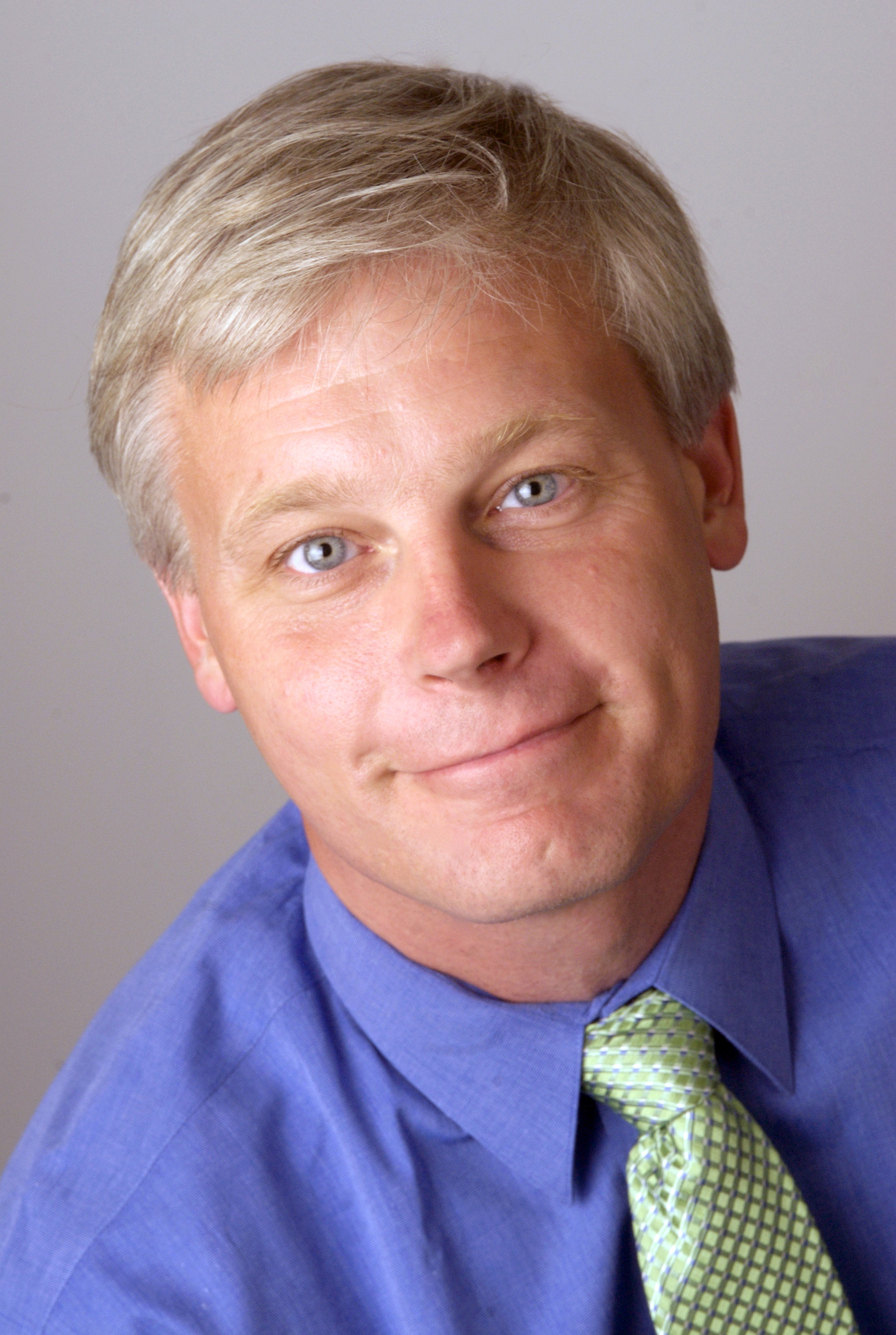
	Majority party	Minority party
Leader	Kurt Daudt	Paul Thissen
Party	Republican	Democratic (DFL)
Leader since	January 8, 2013	January 4, 2011
Leader's seat	31A–Crown	61B–Minneapolis
Last election	72 seats, 50.01%	62 seats, 49.30%
Seats before	73	61
Seats won	77 (Note: 32B results were invalidated because the Republican candidate was ruled ineligible due to residency issues.)	57
Seat change	▲4	▼4
Popular vote	1,400,587	1,366,375
Percentage	50.34	49.11
Swing	▲0.33 pp	▼0.19 pp
Speaker before election
Kurt Daudt
Republican
Elected Speaker
Kurt Daudt
Republican

The 2016 Minnesota House of Representatives election was held in the U.S. state of Minnesota on November 8, 2016, to elect members to the House of Representatives of the 90th Minnesota Legislature. A primary election was held in several districts on August 9, 2016. The election coincided with the election of the other house of the Legislature, the Senate.

The Republican Party of Minnesota won a majority of seats, remaining the majority party, followed by the Minnesota Democratic–Farmer–Labor Party (DFL). The new Legislature convened on January 3, 2017.

== Background ==
The last election resulted in the Republican Party of Minnesota winning a majority of seats, after losing a majority to the Minnesota Democratic–Farmer–Labor Party (DFL) only two years earlier in the previous election. This resulted in split control of the Legislature for the first time since 2006, ending eight years of unified control by either the DFL or the Republicans as well as ending two years of all-DFL control of the Legislature and governorship.

== Electoral system ==
The 134 members of the House of Representatives were elected from single-member districts via first-past-the-post voting for two-year terms. Contested nominations of the DFL and Republican parties for each district were determined by an open primary election. Minor party and independent candidates were nominated by petition. Write-in candidates must have filed a request with the secretary of state's office for votes for them to have been counted.

== Retiring members ==
=== Republican ===
- Mark Anderson, 9A
- Dave Hancock, 2A
- Tim Kelly, 21A
- Tara Mack, 57A
- Denny McNamara, 54B
- Tim Sanders, 37B

=== DFL ===
- Joe Atkins, 52B
- Jason Isaacson, 42B
- Carolyn Laine, 41B
- Carly Melin, 6A
- Jerry Newton, 37A
- Kim Norton, 25B
- Dan Schoen, 54A
- Yvonne Selcer, 48A
- Erik Simonson, 7B

== Predictions ==
Source	Ranking	As of
Governing	Lean R	October 12, 2016

=== Competitive districts ===
According to MinnPost, the Star Tribune, the Pioneer Press, and MPR News, a total of 25 districts were competitive. MinnPost considered 17 districts to be competitive—12 of which were held by the Republicans and five by the DFL, the Star Tribune 22—16 of which were held by the Republicans and six by the DFL, the Pioneer Press eight—seven of which were held by the Republicans and one by the DFL, and MPR News 14—11 of which were held by the Republicans and three by the DFL.

District	Incumbent	Party	First elected	2014 result	MinnPost (November 3, 2016)	Star Tribune (November 3, 2016)	Pioneer Press (October 18, 2016)	MPR News (September 22, 2016)	Result
2A	Dave Hancock‡	Republican	2010, 2014†	52.36%	No	No	No	Yes	Hold
4B	Paul Marquart	DFL	2000	65.84%	Yes	Yes	No	No	Hold
5B	Tom Anzelc	DFL	2006	56.54%	Yes	Yes	No	Yes	Republican gain
10B	Dale Lueck	Republican	2014	51.86%	No	Yes	No	No	Hold
11B	Jason Rarick	Republican	2014	53.67%	No	Yes	No	No	Hold
12A	Jeff Backer	Republican	2014	51.85%	Yes	Yes	No	Yes	Hold
14A	Tama Theis	Republican	2013*	54.90%	Yes	Yes	Yes	No	Hold
14B	Jim Knoblach	Republican	1994, 2014†	50.15%	Yes	Yes	Yes	Yes	Hold
17A	Tim Miller	Republican	2014	55.37%	No	Yes	No	Yes	Hold
17B	Dave Baker	Republican	2014	50.66%	Yes	Yes	Yes	Yes	Hold
21A	Tim Kelly‡	Republican	2008	62.17%	Yes	Yes	Yes	Yes	Hold
24B	Brian Daniels	Republican	2014	50.85%	Yes	Yes	Yes	Yes	Hold
25B	Kim Norton‡	DFL	2006	94.91%§	Yes	Yes	No	Yes	Hold
28B	Greg Davids	Republican	1991*, 2008†	55.88%	Yes	Yes	Yes	No	Hold
37B	Tim Sanders‡	Republican	2008	55.40%	No	Yes	No	No	Hold
42A	Barb Yarusso	DFL	2012	50.55%	No	Yes	No	No	Republican gain
44A	Sarah Anderson	Republican	2006	55.51%	Yes	Yes	No	No	Hold
48A	Yvonne Selcer‡	DFL	2012	50.04%	Yes	Yes	Yes	Yes	Hold
49A	Ron Erhardt	DFL	1990, 2012†	51.38%	Yes	Yes	No	No	Republican gain
50B	Chad Anderson	Republican	2016*	65.60% (Note: Result of winning DFL incumbent Ann Lenczewski, who subsequently resigned, resulting in a special election win by Anderson.)	Yes	Yes	No	No	DFL gain
54B	Denny McNamara‡	Republican	2002	60.54%	Yes	Yes	No	No	Hold
56A	Drew Christensen	Republican	2014	55.81%	No	No	No	Yes	Hold
56B	Roz Peterson	Republican	2014	53.99%	Yes	Yes	Yes	Yes	Hold
57A	Tara Mack‡	Republican	2008	58.44%	Yes	Yes	No	Yes	DFL gain
57B	Anna Wills	Republican	2012	58.40%	No	No	No	Yes	Hold

*Elected in a special election.
†Elected to non-consecutive terms.
‡Retired; did not seek re-election.
§Unopposed.

== Primary elections results ==
District	Party	Candidates	Votes	%
1B	Republican	Deb Kiel	1,380	100.00
1B	DFL	Mike Moore	1,080	71.90
1B	DFL	Erwin Rud	422	28.10
6A	Republican	Rob Farnsworth	856	100.00
6A	DFL	Julie Sandstede	1,676	35.61
6A	DFL	Tom Whiteside	1,468	31.19
6A	DFL	Ben DeNucci	1,303	27.69
6A	DFL	Mike Thompson	259	5.50
7B	Republican	Cody Barringer	494	100.00
7B	DFL	Liz Olson	1,607	89.03
7B	DFL	Bryan Jensen	198	10.97
13A	Republican	Jeff Howe	862	100.00
13A	DFL	Anne Buckvold	494	74.96
13A	DFL	Jane Leitzman	165	25.04
15A	Republican	Sondra Erickson	1,238	74.31
15A	Republican	Tom Heinks	428	25.69
15A	DFL	Kent Lestrud	579	100.00
31A	Republican	Kurt Daudt	1,722	72.11
31A	Republican	Alan Duff	666	27.89
31A	DFL	Sarah Udvig	444	100.00
31B	Republican	Cal Bahr	1,260	56.96
31B	Republican	Tom Hackbarth	952	43.04
31B	DFL	Susan Larson	487	100.00
40B	Republican	Mali Marvin	284	100.00
40B	DFL	Debra Hilstrom	1,083	85.95
40B	DFL	Jim Richards	177	14.05
48A	Republican	Mary Shapiro	1,729	80.61
48A	Republican	Kris Newcomer	416	19.39
48A	DFL	Laurie Pryor	1,271	100.00
50B	Republican	Chad Anderson	1,179	100.00
50B	DFL	Andrew Carlson	2,125	88.58
50B	DFL	Christopher Seymore	274	11.42
56A	Republican	Drew Christensen	970	100.00
56A	DFL	Jared Christiansen	307	60.20
56A	DFL	Dan Kimmel	203	39.80
59A	Republican	Jessica Newville	155	100.00
59A	DFL	Fue Lee	1,584	55.52
59A	DFL	Joe Mullery	1,269	44.48
60B	Republican	Abdimalik Askar	56	100.00
60B	DFL	Ilhan Omar	2,404	40.97
60B	DFL	Mohamud Noor	1,738	29.62
60B	DFL	Phyllis Kahn	1,726	29.41
65A	Republican	Monique Giordana	126	100.00
65A	DFL	Rena Moran	2,310	79.06
65A	DFL	Rashad Turner	612	20.94

Source: Minnesota Secretary of State

== Opinion polling ==
Polling firm	Polling period	Sample size	Margin of error	Republican	DFL	Undecided
Public Policy Polling	July 30 – August 2, 2015	1,015 RV	±3.1 pp	40%	46%	15%

== Results ==
Districts won.

Summary of the November 8, 2016, Minnesota House of Representatives election results
Party	Candidates	Votes			Seats		
Party	Candidates	No.	%	∆pp	No.	∆No.	%
Republican Party of Minnesota	130	1,400,587	50.34	▲0.33	76	▲3	56.72
Minnesota Democratic–Farmer–Labor Party	131	1,366,375	49.11	▼0.19	57	▼4	42.54
Libertarian Party of Minnesota	2	2,467	0.09	▲0.09	0	Steady	0.00
Green Party of Minnesota	1	919	0.03	▼0.07	0	Steady	0.00
Independent	1	5,423	0.19	▲0.19	0	Steady	0.00
Write-in	N/A	6,734	0.24	▼0.10	0	Steady	0.00
Results invalidated (Note: On September 8, 2016, the Minnesota Supreme Court ruled that Barrett was ineligible to be a candidate in District 32B. Barrett's name remained on the ballot, but the results were not certified and a special election was held on February 14, 2017. Republican Ann Neu won the special election.)	2	N/A	N/A	N/A	1	▲1	0.75
Total		2,782,505	100.00	±0.00	134	±0	100.00
Invalid/blank votes		185,776	6.26	▲2.46			
Turnout (out of 3,972,330 eligible voters)		2,968,281	74.72	▲24.21			
Source: Minnesota Secretary of State, Minnesota Legislative Reference Library

Popular vote
Republican	50.34%
DFL	49.11%
Other	0.55%

House seats
Republican	56.72%
DFL	42.54%

=== District results ===
District	Incumbent			Candidates				
District	Name	Party	First elected	Name	Party	Votes	%	Winner Party
1A	Dan Fabian	Republican	2010	Dan Fabian	Republican	14,417	74.24	Republican
1A	Dan Fabian	Republican	2010	George Nyakasi Bass	DFL	4,982	25.66	Republican
1B	Deb Kiel	Republican	2010	Deb Kiel	Republican	11,895	64.75	Republican
1B	Deb Kiel	Republican	2010	Mike Moore	DFL	6,458	35.15	Republican
2A	Dave Hancock‡	Republican	2010, 2014†	Matt Grossell	Republican	12,387	63.94	Republican
2A	Dave Hancock‡	Republican	2010, 2014†	Jerry Loud	DFL	6,925	35.74	Republican
2B	Steve Green	Republican	2012	Steve Green	Republican	11,905	60.94	Republican
2B	Steve Green	Republican	2012	Bryan Klabunde	DFL	7,617	38.99	Republican
3A	Rob Ecklund	DFL	2015*	Rob Ecklund	DFL	13,874	63.25	DFL
3A	Rob Ecklund	DFL	2015*	Tom Long	Republican	8,017	36.55	DFL
3B	Mary Murphy	DFL	1976	Mary Murphy	DFL	13,429	59.57	DFL
3B	Mary Murphy	DFL	1976	Timothy Brandon	Republican	9,090	40.32	DFL
4A	Ben Lien	DFL	2012	Ben Lien	DFL	11,653	62.20	DFL
4A	Ben Lien	DFL	2012	Jordan Idso	Republican	7,066	37.72	DFL
4B	Paul Marquart	DFL	2000	Paul Marquart	DFL	11,054	53.85	DFL
4B	Paul Marquart	DFL	2000	Ben Grimsley	Republican	9,460	46.09	DFL
5A	John Persell	DFL	2008	Matt Bliss	Republican	10,318	53.88	Republican
5A	John Persell	DFL	2008	John Persell	DFL	8,808	45.99	Republican
5B	Tom Anzelc	DFL	2006	Sandy Layman	Republican	11,499	53.61	Republican
5B	Tom Anzelc	DFL	2006	Tom Anzelc	DFL	9,011	42.01	Republican
5B	Tom Anzelc	DFL	2006	Dennis Barsness	Green	919	4.28	Republican
6A	Carly Melin‡	DFL	2011*	Julie Sandstede	DFL	11,852	58.85	DFL
6A	Carly Melin‡	DFL	2011*	Rob Farnsworth	Republican	8,209	40.76	DFL
6B	Jason Metsa	DFL	2012	Jason Metsa	DFL	13,111	60.42	DFL
6B	Jason Metsa	DFL	2012	Matt Matasich	Republican	8,558	39.44	DFL
7A	Jennifer Schultz	DFL	2014	Jennifer Schultz	DFL	15,956	70.30	DFL
7A	Jennifer Schultz	DFL	2014	Dylan Raddant	Republican	6,678	29.42	DFL
7B	Erik Simonson‡	DFL	2012	Liz Olson	DFL	13,824	70.87	DFL
7B	Erik Simonson‡	DFL	2012	Cody Barringer	Republican	5,641	28.92	DFL
8A	Bud Nornes	Republican	1996	Bud Nornes	Republican	14,196	65.19	Republican
8A	Bud Nornes	Republican	1996	CJ Holl	DFL	7,556	34.70	Republican
8B	Mary Franson	Republican	2010	Mary Franson	Republican	14,749	64.87	Republican
8B	Mary Franson	Republican	2010	Gail Kulp	DFL	7,962	35.02	Republican
9A	Mark Anderson‡	Republican	2012	John Poston	Republican	13,304	68.53	Republican
9A	Mark Anderson‡	Republican	2012	Meg Litts	DFL	6,078	31.31	Republican
9B	Ron Kresha	Republican	2012	Ron Kresha	Republican	14,139	72.30	Republican
9B	Ron Kresha	Republican	2012	Dustin Simmonds	DFL	5,402	27.62	Republican
10A	Josh Heintzeman	Republican	2014	Josh Heintzeman	Republican	12,919	59.32	Republican
10A	Josh Heintzeman	Republican	2014	Quinn Nystrom	DFL	8,831	40.55	Republican
10B	Dale Lueck	Republican	2014	Dale Lueck	Republican	14,074	63.13	Republican
10B	Dale Lueck	Republican	2014	Erin Wagner	DFL	8,200	36.78	Republican
11A	Mike Sundin	DFL	2012	Mike Sundin	DFL	11,833	59.68	DFL
11A	Mike Sundin	DFL	2012	Mike Line	Republican	7,968	40.18	DFL
11B	Jason Rarick	Republican	2014	Jason Rarick	Republican	10,904	60.40	Republican
11B	Jason Rarick	Republican	2014	Tom Jones	DFL	7,122	39.45	Republican
12A	Jeff Backer	Republican	2014	Jeff Backer	Republican	13,021	60.46	Republican
12A	Jeff Backer	Republican	2014	Jay McNamar	DFL	8,498	39.46	Republican
12B	Paul Anderson	Republican	2008	Paul Anderson	Republican	18,276	98.23	Republican
13A	Jeff Howe	Republican	2012	Jeff Howe	Republican	14,023	66.02	Republican
13A	Jeff Howe	Republican	2012	Anne Buckvold	DFL	7,201	33.90	Republican
13B	Tim O'Driscoll	Republican	2010	Tim O'Driscoll	Republican	14,882	69.63	Republican
13B	Tim O'Driscoll	Republican	2010	Matthew Crouse	DFL	6,465	30.25	Republican
14A	Tama Theis	Republican	2013*	Tama Theis	Republican	10,961	54.65	Republican
14A	Tama Theis	Republican	2013*	Aric Putnam	DFL	9,059	45.17	Republican
14B	Jim Knoblach	Republican	1994, 2014†	Jim Knoblach	Republican	8,887	51.20	Republican
14B	Jim Knoblach	Republican	1994, 2014†	Zach Dorholt	DFL	8,427	48.55	Republican
15A	Sondra Erickson	Republican	1998*, 2010†	Sondra Erickson	Republican	12,317	63.69	Republican
15A	Sondra Erickson	Republican	1998*, 2010†	Kent Lestrud	DFL	6,973	36.05	Republican
15B	Jim Newberger	Republican	2012	Jim Newberger	Republican	14,949	68.88	Republican
15B	Jim Newberger	Republican	2012	Karla Scapanski	DFL	6,732	31.02	Republican
16A	Chris Swedzinski	Republican	2010	Chris Swedzinski	Republican	13,048	68.10	Republican
16A	Chris Swedzinski	Republican	2010	Al Kruse	DFL	6,096	31.81	Republican
16B	Paul Torkelson	Republican	2008	Paul Torkelson	Republican	14,529	73.06	Republican
16B	Paul Torkelson	Republican	2008	Austin Grossenburg	DFL	5,333	26.82	Republican
17A	Tim Miller	Republican	2014	Tim Miller	Republican	11,603	59.01	Republican
17A	Tim Miller	Republican	2014	Andrew Falk	DFL	8,045	40.91	Republican
17B	Dave Baker	Republican	2014	Dave Baker	Republican	11,908	59.51	Republican
17B	Dave Baker	Republican	2014	Mary Sawatzky	DFL	8,075	40.36	Republican
18A	Dean Urdahl	Republican	2002	Dean Urdahl	Republican	17,787	97.81	Republican
18B	Glenn Gruenhagen	Republican	2010	Glenn Gruenhagen	Republican	13,167	67.80	Republican
18B	Glenn Gruenhagen	Republican	2010	Darrel Mosel	DFL	6,229	32.08	Republican
19A	Clark Johnson	DFL	2013*	Clark Johnson	DFL	11,158	52.68	DFL
19A	Clark Johnson	DFL	2013*	Kim Spears	Republican	10,003	47.23	DFL
19B	Jack Considine	DFL	2014	Jack Considine	DFL	11,377	59.55	DFL
19B	Jack Considine	DFL	2014	Adam Isakson	Republican	7,685	40.23	DFL
20A	Bob Vogel	Republican	2014	Bob Vogel	Republican	13,128	60.81	Republican
20A	Bob Vogel	Republican	2014	Jim Connelly	DFL	8,434	39.07	Republican
20B	David Bly	DFL	2006, 2012†	David Bly	DFL	11,538	54.15	DFL
20B	David Bly	DFL	2006, 2012†	Aramis Wells	Republican	9,754	45.77	DFL
21A	Tim Kelly‡	Republican	2008	Barb Haley	Republican	11,643	54.99	Republican
21A	Tim Kelly‡	Republican	2008	Lisa Bayley	DFL	9,503	44.88	Republican
21B	Steve Drazkowski	Republican	2007*	Steve Drazkowski	Republican	13,688	65.26	Republican
21B	Steve Drazkowski	Republican	2007*	Elise Diesslin	DFL	7,270	34.66	Republican
22A	Joe Schomacker	Republican	2010	Joe Schomacker	Republican	14,316	71.98	Republican
22A	Joe Schomacker	Republican	2010	Laura Woods	DFL	5,564	27.98	Republican
22B	Rod Hamilton	Republican	2004	Rod Hamilton	Republican	11,890	69.48	Republican
22B	Rod Hamilton	Republican	2004	Kirby Kruse	DFL	5,207	30.43	Republican
23A	Bob Gunther	Republican	1995*	Bob Gunther	Republican	13,700	68.14	Republican
23A	Bob Gunther	Republican	1995*	Zac Huntley	DFL	6,390	31.78	Republican
23B	Tony Cornish	Republican	2002	Tony Cornish	Republican	13,332	66.91	Republican
23B	Tony Cornish	Republican	2002	Josh Haseman	DFL	6,574	32.99	Republican
24A	John Petersburg	Republican	2012	John Petersburg	Republican	11,156	56.87	Republican
24A	John Petersburg	Republican	2012	Bev Cashman	DFL	8,439	43.02	Republican
24B	Brian Daniels	Republican	2014	Brian Daniels	Republican	10,475	58.39	Republican
24B	Brian Daniels	Republican	2014	Patti Fritz	DFL	7,441	41.47	Republican
25A	Duane Quam	Republican	2010	Duane Quam	Republican	12,934	59.96	Republican
25A	Duane Quam	Republican	2010	Linda Walbruch	DFL	8,615	39.94	Republican
25B	Kim Norton‡	DFL	2006	Duane Sauke	DFL	10,886	51.79	DFL
25B	Kim Norton‡	DFL	2006	Fran Bradley	Republican	10,106	48.08	DFL
26A	Tina Liebling	DFL	2004	Tina Liebling	DFL	10,737	59.89	DFL
26A	Tina Liebling	DFL	2004	Will Waggoner	Republican	7,168	39.98	DFL
26B	Nels Pierson	Republican	2014	Nels Pierson	Republican	13,832	59.14	Republican
26B	Nels Pierson	Republican	2014	John Austinson	DFL	9,526	40.73	Republican
27A	Peggy Bennett	Republican	2014	Peggy Bennett	Republican	12,329	61.71	Republican
27A	Peggy Bennett	Republican	2014	Gary Schindler	DFL	7,633	38.21	Republican
27B	Jeanne Poppe	DFL	2004	Jeanne Poppe	DFL	9,485	53.61	DFL
27B	Jeanne Poppe	DFL	2004	Dennis Schminke	Republican	8,192	46.30	DFL
28A	Gene Pelowski	DFL	1986	Gene Pelowski	DFL	11,862	63.15	DFL
28A	Gene Pelowski	DFL	1986	Adam Pace	Republican	6,897	36.72	DFL
28B	Greg Davids	Republican	1991*, 2008†	Greg Davids	Republican	11,614	54.54	Republican
28B	Greg Davids	Republican	1991*, 2008†	Thomas Trehus	DFL	9,651	45.32	Republican
29A	Joe McDonald	Republican	2010	Joe McDonald	Republican	14,916	69.62	Republican
29A	Joe McDonald	Republican	2010	Cortney Phillips	DFL	6,482	30.26	Republican
29B	Marion O'Neill	Republican	2012	Marion O'Neill	Republican	12,808	65.53	Republican
29B	Marion O'Neill	Republican	2012	Steve Kilburn	DFL	6,714	34.35	Republican
30A	Nick Zerwas	Republican	2012	Nick Zerwas	Republican	14,305	68.58	Republican
30A	Nick Zerwas	Republican	2012	Sarah Hamlin	DFL	6,527	31.29	Republican
30B	Eric Lucero	Republican	2014	Eric Lucero	Republican	15,050	70.16	Republican
30B	Eric Lucero	Republican	2014	Margaret Fernandez	DFL	6,371	29.70	Republican
31A	Kurt Daudt	Republican	2010	Kurt Daudt	Republican	14,815	70.33	Republican
31A	Kurt Daudt	Republican	2010	Sarah Udvig	DFL	6,208	29.47	Republican
31B	Tom Hackbarth§	Republican	1994, 1998†	Cal Bahr	Republican	14,785	66.42	Republican
31B	Tom Hackbarth§	Republican	1994, 1998†	Susan Larson	DFL	7,438	33.41	Republican
32A	Brian Johnson	Republican	2012	Brian Johnson	Republican	12,928	63.00	Republican
32A	Brian Johnson	Republican	2012	Paul Gammel	DFL	7,551	36.79	Republican
32B	Bob Barrett	Republican	2010	Bob Barrett	Republican	N/A		
32B	Bob Barrett	Republican	2010	Laurie Warner	DFL	N/A		
33A	Jerry Hertaus	Republican	2012	Jerry Hertaus	Republican	17,162	67.76	Republican
33A	Jerry Hertaus	Republican	2012	Norrie Thomas	DFL	8,117	32.05	Republican
33B	Cindy Pugh	Republican	2012	Cindy Pugh	Republican	14,836	60.34	Republican
33B	Cindy Pugh	Republican	2012	Brad Brothen	DFL	9,715	39.51	Republican
34A	Joyce Peppin	Republican	2004	Joyce Peppin	Republican	15,518	65.90	Republican
34A	Joyce Peppin	Republican	2004	Dave Craig	DFL	7,996	33.95	Republican
34B	Dennis Smith	Republican	2014	Dennis Smith	Republican	13,773	55.83	Republican
34B	Dennis Smith	Republican	2014	Kristin Bahner	DFL	10,841	43.95	Republican
35A	Abigail Whelan	Republican	2014	Abigail Whelan	Republican	12,768	61.35	Republican
35A	Abigail Whelan	Republican	2014	Andy Hillebregt	DFL	8,009	38.48	Republican
35B	Peggy Scott	Republican	2008	Peggy Scott	Republican	14,705	64.74	Republican
35B	Peggy Scott	Republican	2008	Wes Volkenant	DFL	7,990	35.17	Republican
36A	Mark Uglem	Republican	2012	Mark Uglem	Republican	12,119	58.21	Republican
36A	Mark Uglem	Republican	2012	Kevin Parker	DFL	8,652	41.56	Republican
36B	Melissa Hortman	DFL	2004	Melissa Hortman	DFL	12,064	55.66	DFL
36B	Melissa Hortman	DFL	2004	Peter Crema	Republican	9,560	44.11	DFL
37A	Jerry Newton‡	DFL	2008, 2012†	Erin Koegel	DFL	9,485	47.17	DFL
37A	Jerry Newton‡	DFL	2008, 2012†	Anthony Wilder	Republican	8,946	44.49	DFL
37A	Jerry Newton‡	DFL	2008, 2012†	Brian McCormick	Libertarian	1,647	8.19	DFL
37B	Tim Sanders‡	Republican	2008	Nolan West	Republican	11,473	50.26	Republican
37B	Tim Sanders‡	Republican	2008	Susan Witt	DFL	11,305	49.52	Republican
38A	Linda Runbeck	Republican	1989*, 2010†	Linda Runbeck	Republican	13,471	61.40	Republican
38A	Linda Runbeck	Republican	1989*, 2010†	Kevin Fogarty	DFL	8,448	38.51	Republican
38B	Matt Dean	Republican	2004	Matt Dean	Republican	13,874	56.94	Republican
38B	Matt Dean	Republican	2004	Ami Wazlawik	DFL	10,465	42.95	Republican
39A	Bob Dettmer	Republican	2006	Bob Dettmer	Republican	14,565	61.43	Republican
39A	Bob Dettmer	Republican	2006	Jody Anderson	DFL	9,124	38.48	Republican
39B	Kathy Lohmer	Republican	2010	Kathy Lohmer	Republican	13,793	59.02	Republican
39B	Kathy Lohmer	Republican	2010	Alan Kantrud	DFL	9,564	40.92	Republican
40A	Mike Nelson	DFL	2002	Mike Nelson	DFL	11,548	96.39	DFL
40B	Debra Hilstrom	DFL	2000	Debra Hilstrom	DFL	11,154	69.24	DFL
40B	Debra Hilstrom	DFL	2000	Mali Marvin	Republican	4,872	30.24	DFL
41A	Connie Bernardy	DFL	2000, 2012†	Connie Bernardy	DFL	12,168	60.38	DFL
41A	Connie Bernardy	DFL	2000, 2012†	Ryan Evanson	Republican	7,946	39.43	DFL
41B	Carolyn Laine‡	DFL	2006	Mary Kunesh-Podein	DFL	12,936	63.24	DFL
41B	Carolyn Laine‡	DFL	2006	Camden Pike	Republican	7,465	36.50	DFL
42A	Barb Yarusso	DFL	2012	Randy Jessup	Republican	11,662	50.18	Republican
42A	Barb Yarusso	DFL	2012	Barb Yarusso	DFL	11,537	49.64	Republican
42B	Jason Isaacson‡	DFL	2012	Jamie Becker-Finn	DFL	12,845	56.90	DFL
42B	Jason Isaacson‡	DFL	2012	Tracy Nelson	Republican	9,688	42.92	DFL
43A	Peter Fischer	DFL	2012	Peter Fischer	DFL	11,970	54.95	DFL
43A	Peter Fischer	DFL	2012	Bob Cardinal	Republican	9,767	44.84	DFL
43B	Leon Lillie	DFL	2004	Leon Lillie	DFL	12,017	59.52	DFL
43B	Leon Lillie	DFL	2004	Nathan Hansen	Republican	8,123	40.23	DFL
44A	Sarah Anderson	Republican	2006	Sarah Anderson	Republican	13,486	54.04	Republican
44A	Sarah Anderson	Republican	2006	Ginny Klevorn	DFL	11,433	45.82	Republican
44B	Jon Applebaum	DFL	2014	Jon Applebaum	DFL	13,929	54.89	DFL
44B	Jon Applebaum	DFL	2014	Patti Meier	Republican	11,393	44.89	DFL
45A	Lyndon Carlson	DFL	1972	Lyndon Carlson	DFL	11,635	56.80	DFL
45A	Lyndon Carlson	DFL	1972	Richard Lieberman	Republican	8,797	42.94	DFL
45B	Mike Freiberg	DFL	2012	Mike Freiberg	DFL	15,261	68.04	DFL
45B	Mike Freiberg	DFL	2012	Alma Wetzker	Republican	7,098	31.65	DFL
46A	Peggy Flanagan	DFL	2015*	Peggy Flanagan	DFL	15,187	63.85	DFL
46A	Peggy Flanagan	DFL	2015*	Anne Taylor	Republican	8,525	35.84	DFL
46B	Cheryl Youakim	DFL	2014	Cheryl Youakim	DFL	14,988	68.67	DFL
46B	Cheryl Youakim	DFL	2014	Bryan Björnson	Republican	6,760	30.97	DFL
47A	Jim Nash	Republican	2014	Jim Nash	Republican	16,696	71.50	Republican
47A	Jim Nash	Republican	2014	Sean White	DFL	6,631	28.40	Republican
47B	Joe Hoppe	Republican	2002	Joe Hoppe	Republican	14,191	62.47	Republican
47B	Joe Hoppe	Republican	2002	Jane Montemayor	DFL	8,510	37.46	Republican
48A	Yvonne Selcer‡	DFL	2012	Laurie Pryor	DFL	12,984	51.66	DFL
48A	Yvonne Selcer‡	DFL	2012	Mary Shapiro	Republican	12,110	48.18	DFL
48B	Jenifer Loon	Republican	2008	Jenifer Loon	Republican	13,559	62.25	Republican
48B	Jenifer Loon	Republican	2008	Ben Sherlock	DFL	8,183	37.57	Republican
49A	Ron Erhardt	DFL	1990, 2012†	Dario Anselmo	Republican	13,075	51.04	Republican
49A	Ron Erhardt	DFL	1990, 2012†	Ron Erhardt	DFL	12,499	48.79	Republican
49B	Paul Rosenthal	DFL	2008, 2012†	Paul Rosenthal	DFL	14,399	55.38	DFL
49B	Paul Rosenthal	DFL	2008, 2012†	Max Rymer	Republican	11,542	44.39	DFL
50A	Linda Slocum	DFL	2006	Linda Slocum	DFL	12,217	63.09	DFL
50A	Linda Slocum	DFL	2006	Tim Johnson	Republican	7,074	36.53	DFL
50B	Chad Anderson	Republican	2016*	Andrew Carlson	DFL	12,084	53.54	DFL
50B	Chad Anderson	Republican	2016*	Chad Anderson	Republican	10,429	46.20	DFL
51A	Sandra Masin	DFL	2006, 2012†	Sandra Masin	DFL	12,036	57.64	DFL
51A	Sandra Masin	DFL	2006, 2012†	Brad Gerten	Republican	8,769	41.99	DFL
51B	Laurie Halverson	DFL	2012	Laurie Halverson	DFL	13,311	56.50	DFL
51B	Laurie Halverson	DFL	2012	Pat Hammond	Republican	10,212	43.35	DFL
52A	Rick Hansen	DFL	2004	Rick Hansen	DFL	13,737	63.33	DFL
52A	Rick Hansen	DFL	2004	Larry Sachi	Republican	7,929	36.55	DFL
52B	Joe Atkins‡	DFL	2002	Regina Barr	Republican	11,001	50.17	Republican
52B	Joe Atkins‡	DFL	2002	Mary T'Kach	DFL	10,880	49.62	Republican
53A	JoAnn Ward	DFL	2012	JoAnn Ward	DFL	12,348	59.03	DFL
53A	JoAnn Ward	DFL	2012	Andy Turonie	Republican	8,535	40.80	DFL
53B	Kelly Fenton	Republican	2014	Kelly Fenton	Republican	13,740	56.35	Republican
53B	Kelly Fenton	Republican	2014	Alberder Gillespie	DFL	10,620	43.56	Republican
54A	Dan Schoen‡	DFL	2012	Keith Franke	Republican	10,483	51.43	Republican
54A	Dan Schoen‡	DFL	2012	Jen Peterson	DFL	9,877	48.46	Republican
54B	Denny McNamara‡	Republican	2002	Tony Jurgens	Republican	11,958	55.27	Republican
54B	Denny McNamara‡	Republican	2002	Don Slaten	DFL	9,633	44.53	Republican
55A	Bob Loonan	Republican	2014	Bob Loonan	Republican	10,898	55.78	Republican
55A	Bob Loonan	Republican	2014	Mary Hernandez	DFL	8,594	43.99	Republican
55B	Tony Albright	Republican	2012	Tony Albright	Republican	15,947	69.05	Republican
55B	Tony Albright	Republican	2012	Ceci Haakenson	DFL	7,112	30.79	Republican
56A	Drew Christensen	Republican	2014	Drew Christensen	Republican	12,069	55.96	Republican
56A	Drew Christensen	Republican	2014	Jared Christiansen	DFL	9,466	43.89	Republican
56B	Roz Peterson	Republican	2014	Roz Peterson	Republican	11,215	52.37	Republican
56B	Roz Peterson	Republican	2014	Lindsey Port	DFL	10,165	47.46	Republican
57A	Tara Mack‡	Republican	2008	Erin Maye Quade	DFL	11,825	52.23	DFL
57A	Tara Mack‡	Republican	2008	Ali Jimenez-Hopper	Republican	10,758	47.52	DFL
57B	Anna Wills	Republican	2012	Anna Wills	Republican	12,382	53.66	Republican
57B	Anna Wills	Republican	2012	John Huot	DFL	10,656	46.18	Republican
58A	Jon Koznick	Republican	2014	Jon Koznick	Republican	13,691	60.65	Republican
58A	Jon Koznick	Republican	2014	LeAnn Weikle	DFL	8,852	39.22	Republican
58B	Pat Garofalo	Republican	2004	Pat Garofalo	Republican	13,926	64.78	Republican
58B	Pat Garofalo	Republican	2004	Marla Vagts	DFL	7,542	35.08	Republican
59A	Joe Mullery§	DFL	1996	Fue Lee	DFL	12,585	80.62	DFL
59A	Joe Mullery§	DFL	1996	Jessica Newville	Republican	2,903	18.60	DFL
59B	Raymond Dehn	DFL	2012	Raymond Dehn	DFL	14,877	76.56	DFL
59B	Raymond Dehn	DFL	2012	Margaret Martín	Republican	4,440	22.85	DFL
60A	Diane Loeffler	DFL	2004	Diane Loeffler	DFL	15,587	73.55	DFL
60A	Diane Loeffler	DFL	2004	Gabe Barnett	Independent	5,423	25.59	DFL
60B	Phyllis Kahn§	DFL	1972	Ilhan Omar	DFL	15,860	79.77	DFL
60B	Phyllis Kahn§	DFL	1972	Abdimalik Askar (Note: Suspended campaign due to family issues. His name remained on the ballot.)	Republican	3,820	19.21	DFL
61A	Frank Hornstein	DFL	2002	Frank Hornstein	DFL	21,656	79.16	DFL
61A	Frank Hornstein	DFL	2002	Brian Rosenblatt	Republican	5,615	20.53	DFL
61B	Paul Thissen	DFL	2002	Paul Thissen	DFL	20,282	80.40	DFL
61B	Paul Thissen	DFL	2002	Tom Gallagher	Republican	4,885	19.36	DFL
62A	Karen Clark	DFL	1980	Karen Clark	DFL	12,657	88.26	DFL
62A	Karen Clark	DFL	1980	Claire Leiter	Republican	1,600	11.16	DFL
62B	Susan Allen	DFL	2012*	Susan Allen	DFL	16,759	98.45	DFL
63A	Jim Davnie	DFL	2000	Jim Davnie	DFL	20,366	85.30	DFL
63A	Jim Davnie	DFL	2000	Kyle Bragg	Republican	3,427	14.35	DFL
63B	Jean Wagenius	DFL	1986	Jean Wagenius	DFL	17,769	76.19	DFL
63B	Jean Wagenius	DFL	1986	Frank Pafko	Republican	5,465	23.43	DFL
64A	Erin Murphy	DFL	2006	Erin Murphy	DFL	18,254	79.70	DFL
64A	Erin Murphy	DFL	2006	Riley Horan	Republican	4,588	20.03	DFL
64B	Dave Pinto	DFL	2014	Dave Pinto	DFL	18,242	74.77	DFL
64B	Dave Pinto	DFL	2014	Emory Dively	Republican	6,103	25.02	DFL
65A	Rena Moran	DFL	2010	Rena Moran	DFL	12,665	82.79	DFL
65A	Rena Moran	DFL	2010	Monique Giordana	Republican	2,564	16.76	DFL
65B	Carlos Mariani	DFL	1990	Carlos Mariani	DFL	13,995	77.03	DFL
65B	Carlos Mariani	DFL	1990	Margaret Mary Stokely	Republican	4,098	22.56	DFL
66A	Alice Hausman	DFL	1989*	Alice Hausman	DFL	15,372	68.41	DFL
66A	Alice Hausman	DFL	1989*	Jon Heyer	Republican	7,067	31.45	DFL
66B	John Lesch	DFL	2002	John Lesch	DFL	11,687	79.73	DFL
66B	John Lesch	DFL	2002	William Brownell	Republican	2,903	19.80	DFL
67A	Tim Mahoney	DFL	1998	Tim Mahoney	DFL	9,945	76.34	DFL
67A	Tim Mahoney	DFL	1998	Andrew Livingston	Republican	3,022	23.20	DFL
67B	Sheldon Johnson	DFL	2000	Sheldon Johnson	DFL	10,021	69.35	DFL
67B	Sheldon Johnson	DFL	2000	Lisa Thompson	Republican	3,553	24.59	DFL
67B	Sheldon Johnson	DFL	2000	Joseph Weverka	Libertarian	820	5.67	DFL

*Elected in a special election.
†Elected to non-consecutive terms.
‡Retired; did not seek re-election.
§Lost primary election for party's nomination.

Withdrawn candidates

The following sought election but later withdrew.

District	Candidates	Party
2A	Roger Erickson	DFL
6A	Mark Larson	DFL
9A	Larry Lundblad	Republican
20B	Jim Flaherty	Republican
25A	Dale Amorosia	DFL
28B	Jon Pieper	DFL
30B	Jeanne Holland	Republican
41A	Valerie Rolstad	DFL
41A	Rich Rosivach	DFL
41A	Ruben Vazquez	DFL
41B	Rachel Nelson	DFL
42B	Kaying Thao	DFL
47B	Libby Fairchild	DFL
49A	Heather Edelson	DFL
49A	Matt Samuel	DFL
52B	Don Lee	Republican
52B	Chris Becker	DFL
53B	Steve Ellenwood	Republican
53B	Kay Hendrikson	DFL
53B	Shelly Schafer	DFL
54A	Warren Claflin	DFL
57A	Ryan Kirkley	Republican
57A	Tasha Wells	Republican

=== Seats changing parties ===
Seat gains and holds by party.

Party	Incumbent	District	First elected	Winner	Party
Republican	Chad Anderson	50B	2016*	Andrew Carlson	DFL
Republican	Tara Mack‡	57A	2008	Erin Maye Quade	DFL
DFL	John Persell	5A	2008	Matt Bliss	Republican
DFL	Tom Anzelc	5B	2006	Sandy Layman	Republican
DFL	Barb Yarusso	42A	2012	Randy Jessup	Republican
DFL	Ron Erhardt	49A	1990, 2012†	Dario Anselmo	Republican
DFL	Joe Atkins‡	52B	2002	Regina Barr	Republican
DFL	Dan Schoen‡	54A	2012	Keith Franke	Republican

*Elected in a special election.
†Elected to non-consecutive terms.
‡Retired; did not seek re-election.

== See also ==
- Minnesota Senate election, 2016
- Minnesota elections, 2016
- Minnesota gubernatorial election, 2014
