= Mark Murdock =

Mark Murdock may refer to:

- Mark Murdock (politician) (born 1952) Minnesota state representative
- Mark Murdock (American football) Texas Longhorns quarterback
