= Mike Nelson (Minnesota politician) =

American politician (1954–2026)

Michael Nelson
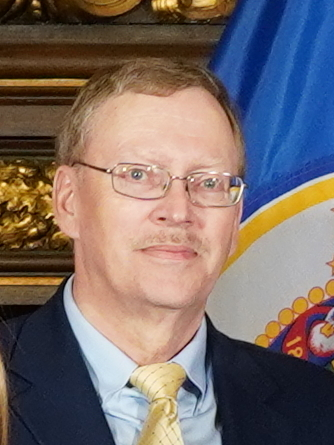

Member of the Minnesota House of Representatives from the 38A district
- In office January 7, 2003 – January 14, 2025
- Preceded by: redrawn district
- Succeeded by: Huldah Hiltsley

Personal details
- Born: June 2, 1954 Minneapolis, Minnesota, U.S.
- Died: May 16, 2026 (aged 71)
- Party: Democratic (DFL)
- Spouse: Kathleen
- Children: 3
- Education: Hennepin Technical College
- Occupation: Business agent; Carpenter; Legislator
- Website: Government website Campaign website

Michael V. Nelson (June 2, 1954 – May 16, 2026) was an American politician who served in the Minnesota House of Representatives from 2003 to 2025. A member of the Minnesota Democratic–Farmer–Labor Party (DFL), he represented District 38A, which includes the cities of Brooklyn Park and Osseo in Hennepin County in the Twin Cities metropolitan area.

== Early life, education, and career ==
Nelson was born in Minneapolis and attended Park Center High School. He attended Hennepin Technical College in Brooklyn Park for carpentry in 1974. He served for 16 years as a member of the Minneapolis Housing Authority.

== Minnesota House of Representatives ==
Nelson was elected to the Minnesota House of Representatives in 2002 and was reelected every two years until 2024. He first ran in a special election after the death of five-term DFL incumbent Darlene Luther, losing to Republican John Jordan. Nelson challenged Jordan again in 2002 and won.

Nelson chaired the Labor and Industry Finance and Policy Committee from 2023 to 2024. He also served on the Property Tax Division and the Transportation Finance and Policy Committee. Nelson chaired the State Government Finance and Elections Committee from 2021 to 2022 and the State Government Finance Division from 2019 to 2020. He chaired the Government Operations Committee from 2013 to 2014 and the Local Government Division from 2009 to 2010, and was an assistant majority leader for the House DFL caucus from 2007 to 2008.

In January 2024, Nelson announced he would not seek reelection after serving ten terms in the Minnesota House, stating "the time has come to pass the torch".

=== Political positions ===
==== State government ====
Nelson has supported Attorney General Keith Ellison's requests to increase funding to hire additional criminal prosecutors, but said in 2021 that Senate Republicans opposed the measure. After protesters took down a statue of Christopher Columbus on the state Capitol grounds, Nelson said he would not hold hearings on legislation to restore the statue. During a 2015 debate over increasing salaries for state commissioners, Nelson said, "We could put a bunch of slugs in there and pay them nothing and then we'd scream when the government is not running right". He opposed a bill to create a legislative budget office in 2015.

==== Labor and unionization ====
Nelson, who worked as a union representative, has supported workers and their right to join a union, and said, "There's been a general war on anyone who is working class and has a union by trying to take union rights away". He authored legislation in 2013 to authorize childcare providers to collectively bargain as part of a union, which passed the House as part of a larger labor bill. He supported legislation approving union contracts that included pay increases for state workers. Nelson served as part of a jobs task force to make recommendations on economic development, capital investment, and tax policies.

==== Elections ====
Nelson has supported legislation to increase funding for election cybersecurity updates and authorize federal funds from the Help America Vote Act to improve election security. He expressed concern over a proposal to move Minnesota's primary from August to June, and cosponsored a bill to ban ranked-choice voting in the state.

==== Other political positions ====
Nelson voted in favor of a bill to build a new Minnesota Vikings stadium with a mix of private and state funds. He supported bills to pay off the stadium's debt ahead of schedule. In 2017, he was the only "no" vote on a hearing for a bill to increase legislative control over the Minnesota Sports Facilities Authority, which oversees the U.S. Bank Stadium oversight panel.

== Electoral history ==
2002 Minnesota State House - District 47A Special Election
| Party | Candidate | Votes | % |
|---|---|---|---|
| Republican | John Jordan | 1,468 | 55.69 |
| Democratic (DFL) | Mike Nelson | 1,058 | 40.14 |
| Independent | Pat O'Brien | 107 | 4.06 |
| Write-in | | 3 | 0.11 |
| Total votes | | 2,636 | 100.00 |
| Republican gain from Democratic (DFL) | | | |

2002 Minnesota State House - District 46A
| Party | Candidate | Votes | % |
|---|---|---|---|
| Democratic (DFL) | Mike Nelson | 6,452 | 55.47 |
| Republican | John Jordan (incumbent) | 5,163 | 44.39 |
| Write-in | | 17 | 0.15 |
| Total votes | | 11,632 | 100.00 |
| Democratic (DFL) gain from Republican | | | |

2004 Minnesota State House - District 46A
| Party | Candidate | Votes | % |
|---|---|---|---|
| Democratic (DFL) | Mike Nelson (incumbent) | 8,965 | 62.22 |
| Republican | Linda J. Etim | 5,408 | 37.53 |
| Write-in | | 35 | 0.24 |
| Total votes | | 14,408 | 100.00 |
| Democratic (DFL) hold | | | |

2006 Minnesota State House - District 46A
| Party | Candidate | Votes | % |
|---|---|---|---|
| Democratic (DFL) | Mike Nelson (incumbent) | 6,007 | 63.61 |
| Republican | Linda J. Etim | 3,422 | 36.42 |
| Write-in | | 14 | 0.15 |
| Total votes | | 9,443 | 100.00 |
| Democratic (DFL) hold | | | |

2008 Minnesota State House - District 46A
| Party | Candidate | Votes | % |
|---|---|---|---|
| Democratic (DFL) | Michael V. Nelson (incumbent) | 9,275 | 65.94 |
| Republican | Gene Lotts | 4,730 | 33.63 |
| Write-in | | 61 | 0.43 |
| Total votes | | 14,066 | 100.00 |
| Democratic (DFL) hold | | | |

2010 Minnesota State House - District 46A
| Party | Candidate | Votes | % |
|---|---|---|---|
| Democratic (DFL) | Michael Nelson (incumbent) | 5,043 | 58.66 |
| Republican | Chuck Sutphen | 3,546 | 41.25 |
| Write-in | | 8 | 0.09 |
| Total votes | | 8,597 | 100.00 |
| Democratic (DFL) hold | | | |

2012 Minnesota State House - District 40A
| Party | Candidate | Votes | % |
|---|---|---|---|
| Democratic (DFL) | Michael Nelson (incumbent) | 11,972 | 97.18 |
| Write-in | | 347 | 2.82 |
| Total votes | | 12,319 | 100.00 |
| Democratic (DFL) hold | | | |

2014 Minnesota State House - District 40A
| Party | Candidate | Votes | % |
|---|---|---|---|
| Democratic (DFL) | Michael Nelson (incumbent) | 5,711 | 64.85 |
| Republican | Chuck Sutphen | 3,077 | 34.94 |
| Write-in | | 18 | 0.20 |
| Total votes | | 8,806 | 100.00 |
| Democratic (DFL) hold | | | |

2016 Minnesota State House - District 40A
| Party | Candidate | Votes | % |
|---|---|---|---|
| Democratic (DFL) | Michael Nelson (incumbent) | 11,548 | 96.39 |
| Write-in | | 433 | 3.61 |
| Total votes | | 11,981 | 100.00 |
| Democratic (DFL) hold | | | |

2018 Minnesota State House - District 40A
| Party | Candidate | Votes | % |
|---|---|---|---|
| Democratic (DFL) | Michael V. Nelson (incumbent) | 9,387 | 73.12 |
| Republican | David True | 3,411 | 26.57 |
| Write-in | | 40 | 0.31 |
| Total votes | | 12,838 | 100.00 |
| Democratic (DFL) hold | | | |

2020 Minnesota State House - District 40A
| Party | Candidate | Votes | % |
|---|---|---|---|
| Democratic (DFL) | Michael V. Nelson (incumbent) | 11,775 | 72.90 |
| Republican | David True | 4,348 | 26.92 |
| Write-in | | 30 | 0.19 |
| Total votes | | 16,153 | 100.00 |
| Democratic (DFL) hold | | | |

2022 Minnesota State House - District 38A
| Party | Candidate | Votes | % |
|---|---|---|---|
| Democratic (DFL) | Michael "Mike" Nelson (incumbent) | 8,252 | 95.65 |
| Write-in | | 375 | 4.35 |
| Total votes | | 8,627 | 100.00 |
| Democratic (DFL) hold | | | |

== Personal life ==
Nelson lived in Brooklyn Park, Minnesota with his spouse, Kathleen, and had three children.

Nelson died on May 16, 2026, after a short illness. He was Lutheran.
