= Tama Theis =

American politician (born 1960)

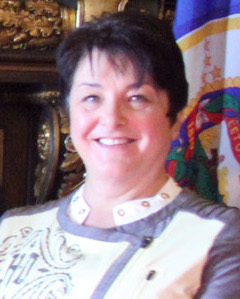

Member of the Minnesota House of Representatives from the 14A district
- In office February 19, 2013 – January 3, 2023
- Preceded by: Steve Gottwalt (District 15A)
- Succeeded by: Bernie Perryman (District 14A)

Personal details
- Born: February 9, 1960 (age 66)
- Party: Republican Party of Minnesota
- Spouse: Greg
- Children: 2
- Education: St. Cloud Technical and Community College (A.A.S.)
- Occupation: small business owner

Tama Theis (born February 9, 1960) is a Minnesota politician and former member of the Minnesota House of Representatives. A member of the Republican Party of Minnesota, she represented District 14A in central Minnesota.

== Education ==
Theis attended St. Cloud Technical and Community College, graduating with an A.A.S.

== Minnesota House of Representatives ==
Theis was elected to the Minnesota House of Representatives in a special election in 2013.

== Opposition to COVID vaccine mandates ==
In December 2021, Theis joined 37 other Republican members of the Minnesota House in signing a letter to the Mayo Clinic challenging its policy requiring staff to be vaccinated against COVID-19. The letter said in part, "We will not support state funding for programs like these, or any other funding, for any healthcare facility that fires their employees due to unrealistic vaccine mandate policies."

== Personal life ==
Theis is married to Greg Theis. They have two children and reside in St. Cloud, Minnesota.
