= 2013 Minnesota House of Representatives district 14A special election =

District 14A special election, 2013
- February 12, 2013

The District 14A seat in the Minnesota House of Representatives
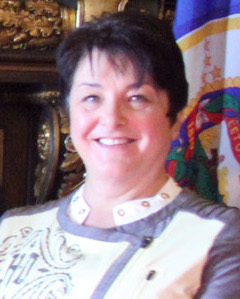
Nominee	Tama Theis	Joanne Dorsher
Party	Republican	Democratic (DFL)
Popular vote	2,670	2,091
Percentage	54.51%	42.69%
- Precinct Results Theis: 50-60% 60-70% 70-80% Dorsher: 40-50% 50-60% 60-70%
Representative before election
Steve Gottwalt
Republican
Elected Representative
Tama Theis
Republican

A special election was held in the U.S. state of Minnesota on February 12, 2013, to elect a new representative for District 14A in the Minnesota House of Representatives, caused by the resignation of Representative Steve Gottwalt on January 7, 2013. A primary election was not held. The election coincided with the District 19A special election. Tama Theis, the Republican Party of Minnesota nominee, won the special election.

== Background ==
On January 3, 2013, Representative Steve Gottwalt announced that he would resign to take a job as the director of state legislative policy for the Center for Diagnostic Imaging. He resigned on January 7, 2013, the day before the beginning of the new session of the Minnesota Legislature.

== Candidates ==
=== Minnesota Democratic–Farmer–Labor Party ===
==== Nominee ====
- Joanne Dorsher (party endorsed), former St. Cloud school board member

==== Declined ====
- Jerry McCarter, former candidate for the Minnesota Senate

=== Republican Party of Minnesota ===
==== Nominee ====
- Tama Theis (party endorsed), small business owner

==== Withdrawn ====
- Scott Mac Hardy, Iraq War veteran
- James Parmele
- John Severson, former St. Cloud city council member

=== Independence Party of Minnesota ===
==== Nominee ====
- Todd McKee, small business owner; part-time truck driver

== Results ==
Election	Political result	Candidate	Party	Votes	%	∆pp
District 14A special election, 2013; Resignation of Steve Gottwalt; Voters: 4,898 (−74.29%)	Republican hold Plurality: 579 (11.82 pp) +3.72	Tama Theis	Republican	2,670	54.51	−5.39
District 14A special election, 2013; Resignation of Steve Gottwalt; Voters: 4,898 (−74.29%)	Republican hold Plurality: 579 (11.82 pp) +3.72	Joanne Dorsher	DFL	2,091	42.69	−3.11
District 14A special election, 2013; Resignation of Steve Gottwalt; Voters: 4,898 (−74.29%)	Republican hold Plurality: 579 (11.82 pp) +3.72	Todd McKee	Independence	130	2.65	N/A
District 14A special election, 2013; Resignation of Steve Gottwalt; Voters: 4,898 (−74.29%)	Republican hold Plurality: 579 (11.82 pp) +3.72	Write-in	N/A	7	0.14	−0.15

== Previous election results ==
Election	Political result	Candidate	Party	Votes	%
Minnesota House of Representatives elections, 2012; Redrawn district Voters: 19,051	Republican win Plurality: 1,543 (8.10 pp)	Steve Gottwalt	Republican	10,269	53.90
Minnesota House of Representatives elections, 2012; Redrawn district Voters: 19,051	Republican win Plurality: 1,543 (8.10 pp)	Anne Nolan	DFL	8,726	45.80
Minnesota House of Representatives elections, 2012; Redrawn district Voters: 19,051	Republican win Plurality: 1,543 (8.10 pp)	Write-in	N/A	56	0.29
