= 2004 Minnesota House of Representatives election =

- November 2, 2004

All 134 seats in the Minnesota House of Representatives 68 seats needed for a majority
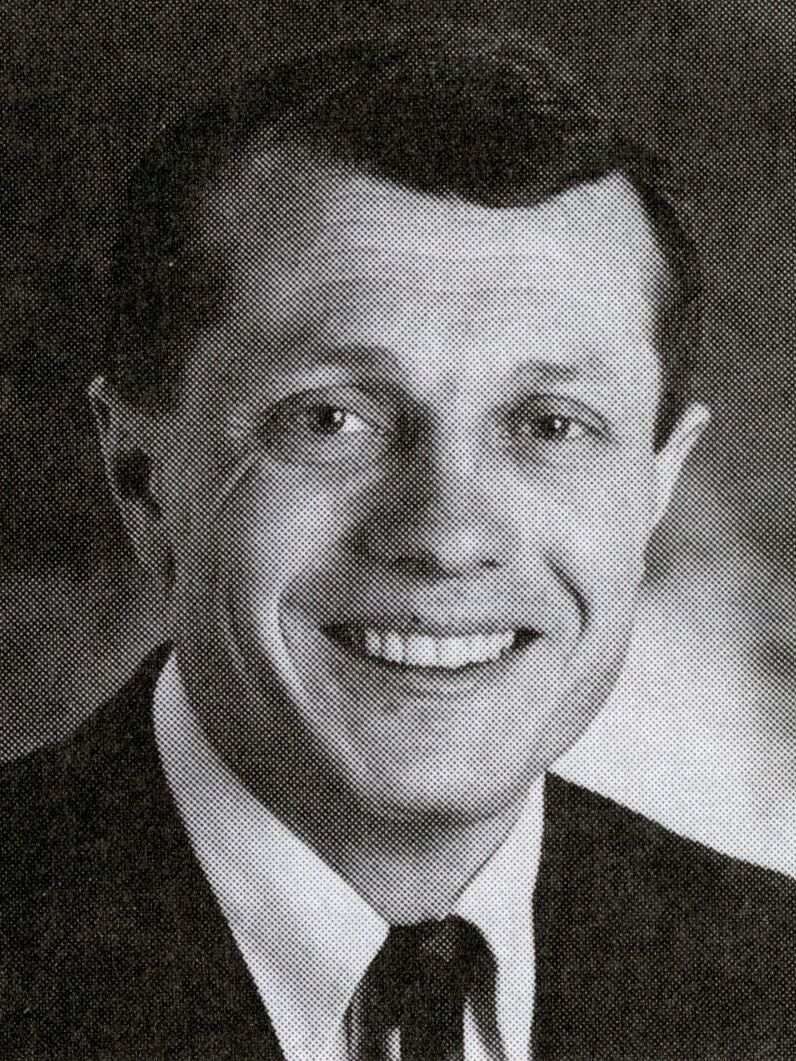

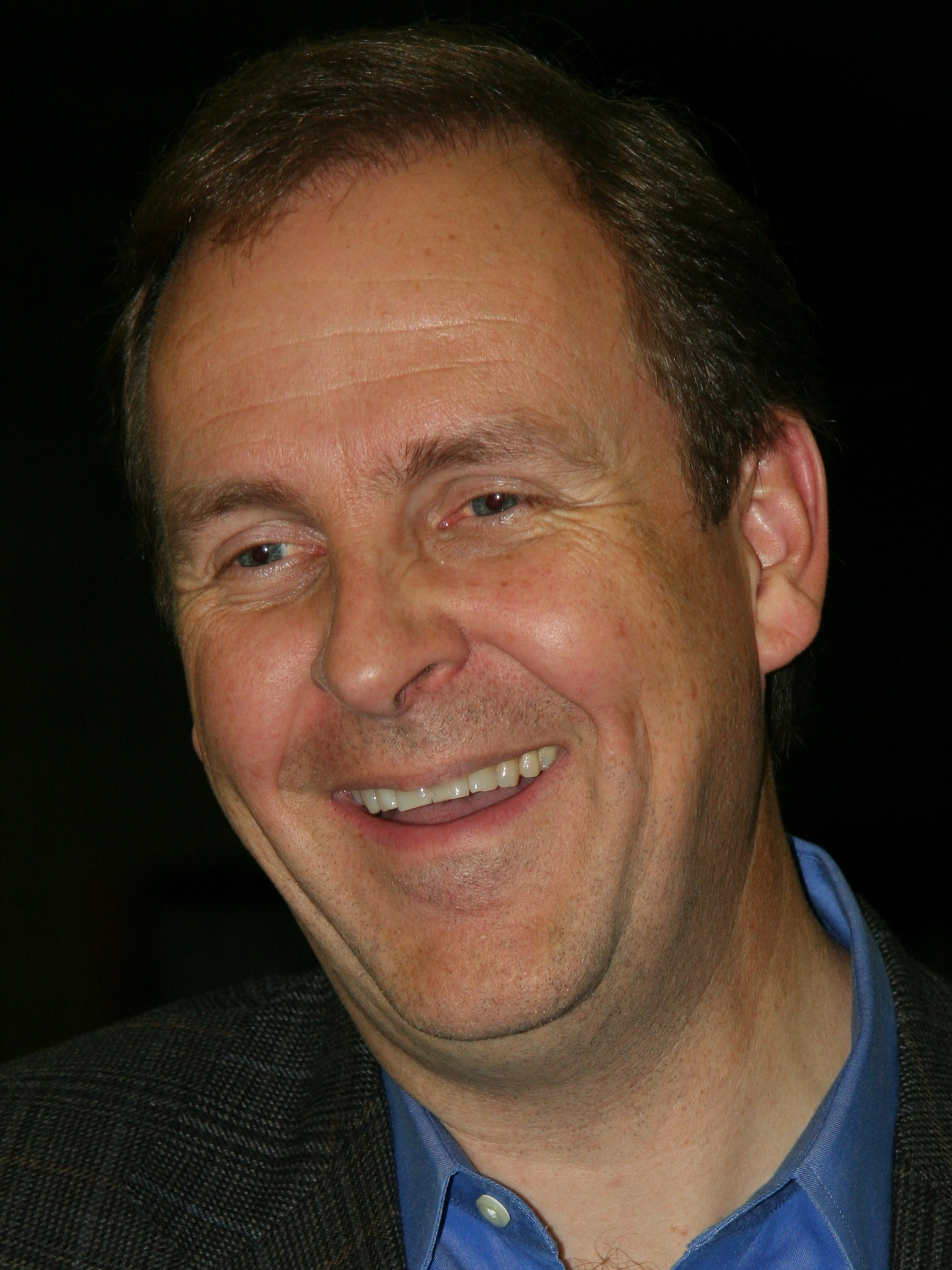
	Majority party	Minority party
Leader	Steve Sviggum	Matt Entenza
Party	Republican	Democratic (DFL)
Leader since	April 17, 1992	January 7, 2003
Leader's seat	28B–Kenyon	64A–Saint Paul
Last election	82 seats, 49.13%	52 seats, 47.84%
Seats before	81	53
Seats won	68	66
Seat change	▼13	▲13
Popular vote	1,262,423	1,381,412
Percentage	46.79%	51.20%
Swing	▼2.34 pp	▲3.36 pp
Speaker before election
Steve Sviggum
Republican
Elected Speaker
Steve Sviggum
Republican

The 2004 Minnesota House of Representatives election was held in the U.S. state of Minnesota on November 2, 2004, to elect members to the House of Representatives of the 84th Minnesota Legislature. A primary election was held on September 14, 2004.

The Republican Party of Minnesota won a majority of seats, remaining the majority party, followed by the Minnesota Democratic–Farmer–Labor Party (DFL). The new Legislature convened on January 4, 2005.

== Predictions ==
Source	Ranking	As of
Rothenberg	Safe R	October 1, 2004

== Results ==
Summary of the November 2, 2004 Minnesota House of Representatives election results
Party	Candidates	Votes			Seats		
Party	Candidates	No.	%	∆pp	No.	∆No.	%
Republican Party of Minnesota	133	1,262,423	46.79	▼2.34	68	▼13	50.75
Minnesota Democratic–Farmer–Labor Party	133	1,381,412	51.20	▲3.36	66	▲13	49.25
Independence Party of Minnesota	21	28,274	1.05	▼0.96	0	Steady	0.00
Green Party of Minnesota	7	8,452	0.31	▼0.30	0	Steady	0.00
Libertarian Party of Minnesota	1	574	0.02	▲0.02	0	Steady	0.00
Independent	2	12,346	0.46	▲0.43	0	Steady	0.00
Write-in	N/A	4,411	0.16	▼0.15	0	Steady	0.00
Total		2,697,892	100.00	±0.00	134	±0	100.00
Invalid/blank votes		145,020	5.10	▼0.21			
Turnout (out of 3,609,185 eligible voters)		2,842,912	78.77	▲13.88			
Source: Minnesota Secretary of State, Minnesota Legislative Reference Library

== See also ==
- Minnesota Senate election, 2002
- Minnesota gubernatorial election, 2002
