= Mark Murdock (politician) =

American politician

Member of the Minnesota House of Representatives from the 10B district
- In office January 6, 2009 – January 7, 2013
- Preceded by: Dean Simpson
- Succeeded by: Joe Radinovich

Personal details
- Born: February 20, 1952 (age 74) Salem, Oregon, U.S.
- Party: Republican
- Spouse: Pat
- Children: 2
- Education: Southwest Minnesota State College
- Profession: Hardware store owner, legislator

Mark A. Murdock (born February 20, 1952) is an American politician and former member of the Minnesota House of Representatives representing District 10B, which included portions of Becker, Otter Tail and Wadena counties in the northwestern part of the state. A Republican, he is also the owner and operator of an ACE Hardware in Perham.

Murdock was elected in 2008, running after three-term Rep. Dean Simpson opted not to seek re-election. He was re-elected in 2010. He was a member of the House's Commerce and Labor Committee and K-12 Education Policy and Oversight Committee, and also served on the Commerce and Labor Subcommittee for the Labor and Consumer Protection Division, on which he was the ranking minority party member, and the Environment Policy and Oversight Subcommittee for the Game, Fish and Forestry Division.

He did not run for re-election in 2012 and his term expired in January 2013. In his announcement that he would not seek re-election, he stated he wanted to spend more time with his family. He also stated that "four years at the Capitol is enough" and that he "never went to St. Paul with the intention of being a career politician."

== Personal life ==
Murdock graduated from Owatonna High School. He attended Southwest Minnesota State College in Marshall, graduating with a B.A. in history and political science in 1974. He is Catholic. He has been active in his community as a bank board and chamber of commerce member, and is a former president of the local Jaycees.

== Political views ==
While a member of the Minnesota House of Representatives he was against raising taxes and in favor of removing the state ban on new nuclear power plants. In his own words, his priorities were the "economy, fair funding of education, and affordable health care."
