= 2006 Minnesota House of Representatives election =

- November 7, 2006

All 134 seats in the Minnesota House of Representatives 68 seats needed for a majority
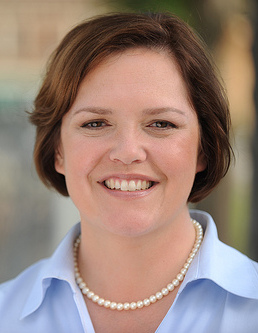

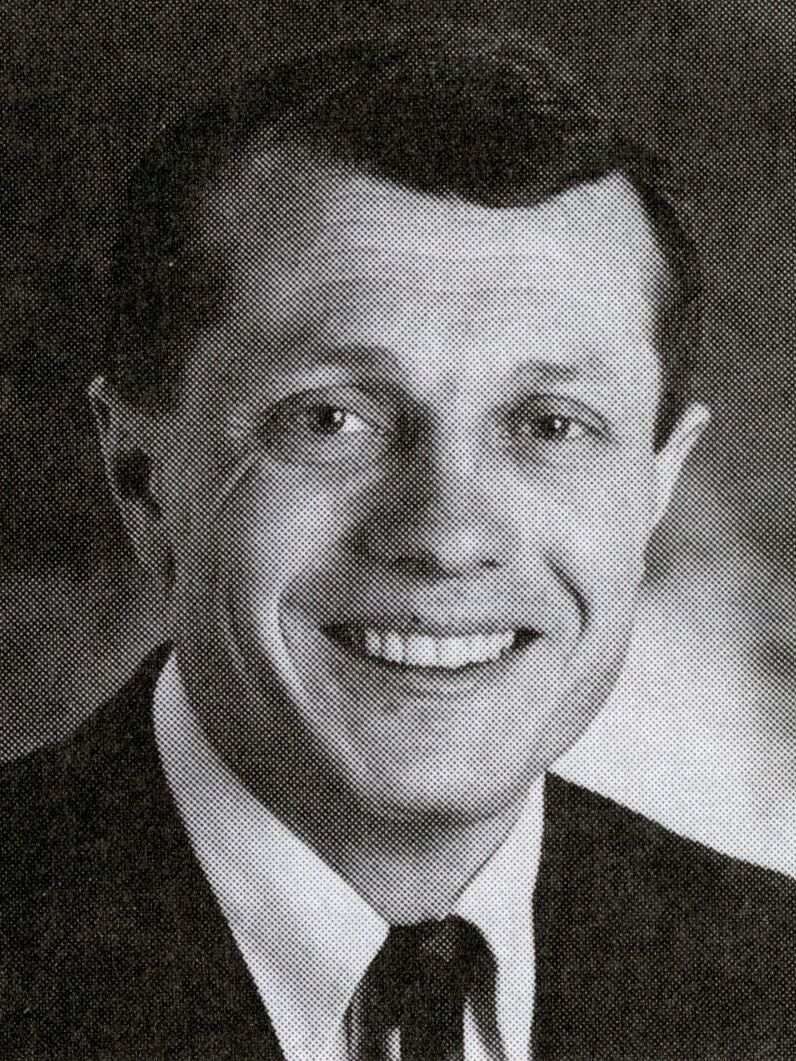
	Majority party	Minority party
Leader	Margaret Anderson Kelliher	Steve Sviggum
Party	Democratic (DFL)	Republican
Leader since	June 20, 2006	April 17, 1992
Leader's seat	60A–Minneapolis	28B–Kenyon
Last election	66 seats, 51.20%	68 seats, 46.79%
Seats won	85	49
Seat change	▲19	▼19
Popular vote	1,169,298	947,138
Percentage	54.86%	44.44%
Swing	▲3.66 pp	▼2.35 pp
Speaker before election
Steve Sviggum
Republican
Elected Speaker
Margaret Anderson Kelliher
Democratic (DFL)

The 2006 Minnesota House of Representatives election was held in the U.S. state of Minnesota on November 7, 2006, to elect members to the House of Representatives of the 85th Minnesota Legislature. A primary election was held in several districts on September 12, 2006.

The Minnesota Democratic–Farmer–Labor Party (DFL) won a majority of seats, defeating the Republican Party of Minnesota, which had a majority since defeating the DFL in the 1998 election. The new Legislature convened on January 3, 2007.

== Predictions ==
Source	Ranking	As of
Rothenberg	Tossup	November 4, 2006

== Results ==
Summary of the November 7, 2006 Minnesota House of Representatives election results
Party	Candidates	Votes			Seats		
Party	Candidates	No.	%	∆pp	No.	∆No.	%
Minnesota Democratic–Farmer–Labor Party	132	1,169,298	54.86	▲3.66	85	▲19	63.43
Republican Party of Minnesota	131	947,138	44.44	▼2.35	49	▼19	36.57
Independence Party of Minnesota	9	6,648	0.31	▼0.74	0	Steady	0.00
Green Party of Minnesota	1	2,671	0.13	▼0.18	0	Steady	0.00
Independent	1	555	0.03	▼0.43	0	Steady	0.00
Write-in	N/A	5,048	0.24	▲0.08	0	Steady	0.00
Total		2,131,358	100.00	±0.00	134	±0	100.00
Invalid/blank votes		86,460	3.90	▼1.20			
Turnout (out of 3,667,707 eligible voters)		2,217,818	60.47	▼18.30			
Source: Minnesota Secretary of State, Minnesota Legislative Reference Library

== See also ==
- Minnesota Senate election, 2006
- Minnesota gubernatorial election, 2006
- Minnesota elections, 2006
