= 1996 Minnesota Senate election =

Minnesota Senate election, 1996
- November 5, 1996

All 67 seats in the Minnesota Senate 34 seats needed for a majority
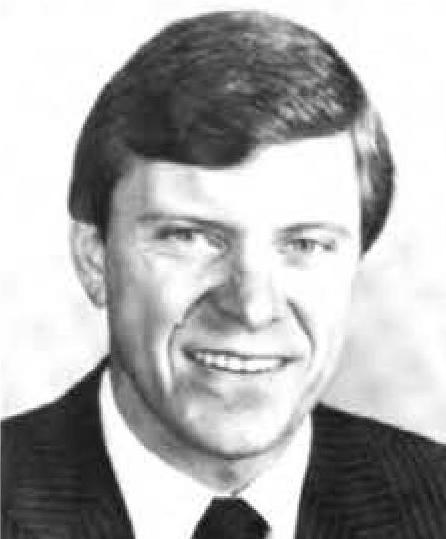
	Majority party	Minority party
Leader	Roger Moe	Dean Johnson
Party	Democratic (DFL)	Republican
Leader since	1980	November 10, 1992
Leader's seat	2nd–Erskine	15th–Willmar
Last election	45 seats	22 seats
Seats before	41	25
Seats won	42	24
Seat change	▲1	▼1
Popular vote	1,129,095	934,906
Majority Leader before election
Roger Moe
Democratic (DFL)
Elected Majority Leader
Roger Moe
Democratic (DFL)

The 1996 Minnesota Senate election was held in the U.S. state of Minnesota on November 5, 1996, to elect members to the Senate of the 80th and 81st Minnesota Legislatures. A primary election was held on September 10, 1996.

The Minnesota Democratic–Farmer–Labor Party (DFL) won a majority of seats, remaining the majority party, followed by the Republican Party of Minnesota. The new Legislature convened on January 7, 1997.

The Independent-Republican Party had changed its name back to the Republican Party on September 23, 1995.

== Results ==
Summary of the November 5, 1996 Minnesota Senate election results
Party	Candidates	Votes	Seats		
Party	Candidates	Votes	No.	∆No.	%
Minnesota Democratic–Farmer–Labor Party	67	1,129,095	42	▲1	62.69
Republican Party of Minnesota	65	934,906	24	▼1	35.82
Reform Party of Minnesota	8	15,289	0	Steady	0.00
Libertarian Party of Minnesota	4	3,542	0	Steady	0.00
Grassroots Party of Minnesota	1	2,389	0	Steady	0.00
Independent	3	19,835	1	Steady	1.49
Total			67	±0	100.00
Turnout (out of 3,319,509 eligible voters)	2,211,161	66.61%		▼7.30 pp	
Source: Minnesota Secretary of State, Minnesota Legislative Reference Library

== See also ==
- Minnesota House of Representatives election, 1996
- Minnesota gubernatorial election, 1994
