= 1996 Minnesota House of Representatives election =

- November 5, 1996

All 134 seats in the Minnesota House of Representatives 68 seats needed for a majority
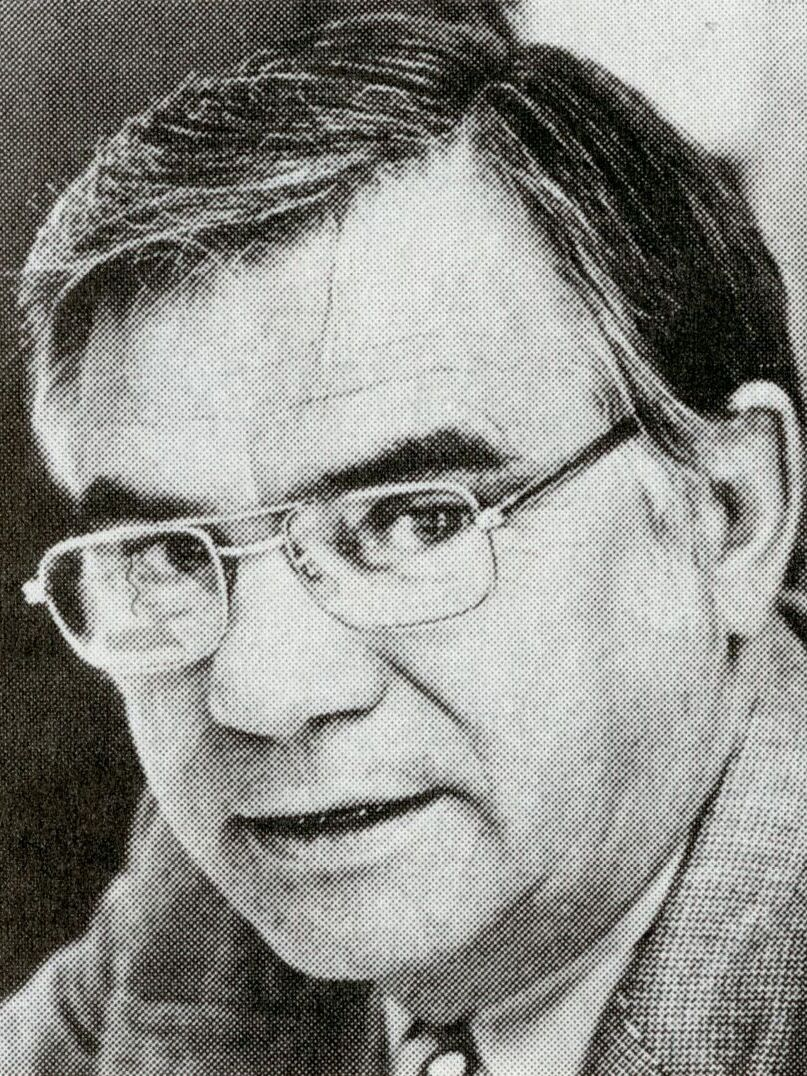

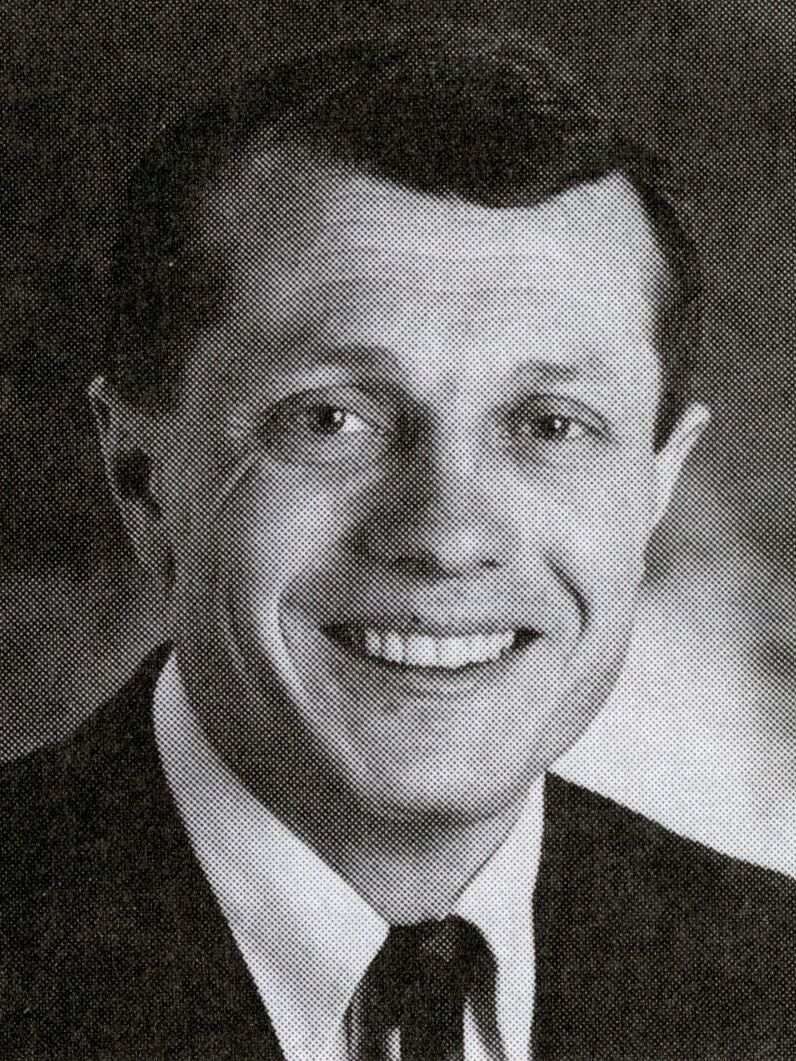
	Majority party	Minority party
Leader	Irv Anderson	Steve Sviggum
Party	Democratic (DFL)	Republican
Leader since	September 1, 1993	April 17, 1992
Leader's seat	3A–International Falls	28B–Kenyon
Last election	71 seats	63 seats
Seats before	69	65
Seats won	70	64
Seat change	▲1	▼1
Popular vote	1,027,921	1,029,783
Percentage	46.48%	46.57%
Speaker before election
Irv Anderson
Democratic (DFL)
Elected Speaker
Phil Carruthers
Democratic (DFL)

The 1996 Minnesota House of Representatives election was held in the U.S. state of Minnesota on November 5, 1996, to elect members to the House of Representatives of the 80th Minnesota Legislature. A primary election was held on September 10, 1996.

The Minnesota Democratic–Farmer–Labor Party (DFL) won a majority of seats, remaining the majority party, followed by the Republican Party of Minnesota. The new Legislature convened on January 7, 1997.

The Independent-Republican Party had changed its name back to the Republican Party on September 23, 1995.

== Results ==
Summary of the November 5, 1996 Minnesota House of Representatives election results
Party	Candidates	Votes	Seats		
Party	Candidates	Votes	No.	∆No.	%
Minnesota Democratic–Farmer–Labor Party	126	1,027,921	70	▲1	52.24
Republican Party of Minnesota	132	1,029,783	64	▼1	47.76
Reform Party of Minnesota	14	16,459	0	Steady	0.00
Green Party of Minnesota	1	3,649	0	Steady	0.00
Natural Law Party of Minnesota	1	392	0	Steady	0.00
Independent	3	7,383	0	Steady	0.00
Write-in	1	3,078	0	Steady	0.00
Total			134	±0	100.00
Turnout (out of 3,319,509 eligible voters)	2,211,161	66.61%		▲11.46 pp	
Source: Minnesota Secretary of State, Minnesota Legislative Reference Library

== See also ==
- Minnesota Senate election, 1996
- Minnesota gubernatorial election, 1994
