= 1998 Minnesota House of Representatives election =

- November 3, 1998

All 134 seats in the Minnesota House of Representatives 68 seats needed for a majority
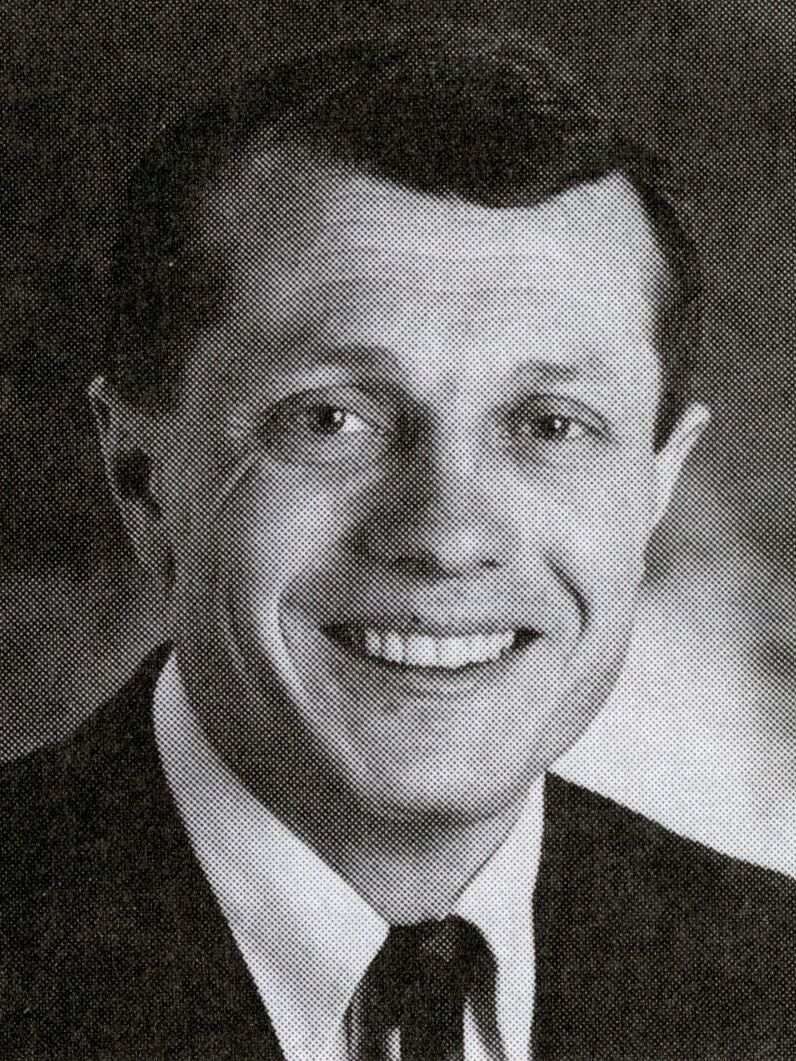
	Majority party	Minority party
		DFL
Leader	Steve Sviggum	Phil Carruthers
Party	Republican	Democratic (DFL)
Leader since	April 17, 1992	November 7, 1996
Leader's seat	28B–Kenyon	47B–Brooklyn Center
Last election	64 seats	70 seats
Seats won	71	63
Seat change	▲7	▼7
Popular vote	1,050,635	934,919
Percentage	52.18%	46.43%
Speaker before election
Phil Carruthers
Democratic (DFL)
Elected Speaker
Steve Sviggum
Republican

The 1998 Minnesota House of Representatives election was held in the U.S. state of Minnesota on November 3, 1998, to elect members to the House of Representatives of the 81st Minnesota Legislature. A primary election was held on September 15, 1998.

The Republican Party of Minnesota won a majority of seats, defeating the Minnesota Democratic–Farmer–Labor Party (DFL), which had a majority since the 1986 election. The new Legislature convened on January 6, 1999.

== Results ==
Summary of the November 3, 1998 Minnesota House of Representatives election results
Party	Candidates	Votes		Seats		
Party	Candidates	No.	%	No.	∆No.	%
Republican Party of Minnesota	134	1,050,635	52.18	71	▲7	52.99
Minnesota Democratic–Farmer–Labor Party	127	934,919	46.43	63	▼7	47.01
Reform Party of Minnesota	14	18,949	0.94	0	Steady	0.00
Grassroots Party of Minnesota	1	1,270	0.06	0	Steady	0.00
Libertarian Party of Minnesota	1	1,121	0.06	0	Steady	0.00
Independent	2	1,964	0.10	0	Steady	0.00
Write-in	N/A	4,654	0.23	0	Steady	0.00
Total		2,013,500	100.00	134	±0	100.00
Invalid/blank votes		92,484	4.39			
Turnout (out of 3,378,089 eligible voters)		2,105,984	62.34	▼4.27 pp		
Source: Minnesota Secretary of State, Minnesota Legislative Reference Library

== See also ==
- Minnesota Senate election, 1996
- Minnesota gubernatorial election, 1998
