= 2002 Minnesota Senate election =

Minnesota Senate election, 2002
- November 5, 2002

All 67 seats in the Minnesota Senate 34 seats needed for a majority
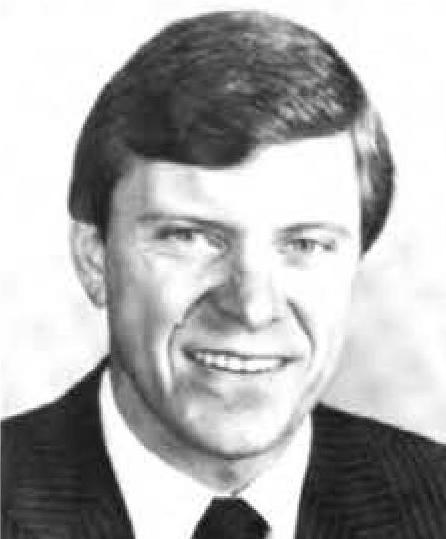

	Majority party	Minority party	Third party
Leader	Roger Moe (retired)	Dick Day	Bob Lessard (retired)
Party	Democratic (DFL)	Republican	Independence
Leader since	1980	July 9, 1997	January 3, 2001
Leader's seat	2nd–Erskine	26th–Owatonna	3rd–International Falls
Last election	39 seats	27 seats	0 seats
Seats before	39	26	2
Seats won	35	31	1
Seat change	▼4	▲5	▼1
Popular vote	1,080,975	994,454	73,439
Percentage	49.69%	45.71%	3.38%
Majority Leader before election
Roger Moe
Democratic (DFL)
Elected Majority Leader
John Hottinger
Democratic (DFL)

The 2002 Minnesota Senate election was held in the U.S. state of Minnesota on November 5, 2002, to elect members to the Senate of the 83rd and 84th Minnesota Legislatures. A primary election was held on September 10, 2002.

The Minnesota Democratic–Farmer–Labor Party (DFL) won a majority of seats, remaining the majority party, followed by the Republican Party of Minnesota. The new Legislature convened on January 7, 2003.

== Predictions ==
Source	Ranking	As of
The Cook; Political Report	Likely D	October 4, 2002

== Results ==
Summary of the November 5, 2002 Minnesota Senate election results
Party	Candidates	Votes		Seats		
Party	Candidates	No.	%	No.	∆No.	%
Minnesota Democratic–Farmer–Labor Party	66	1,080,975	49.69	35	▼4	52.24
Republican Party of Minnesota	64	994,454	45.71	31	▲5	46.27
Independence Party of Minnesota	17	73,439	3.38	1	▼1	1.49
Green Party of Minnesota	8	19,315	0.89	0	Steady	0.00
Constitution Party of Minnesota	1	1,006	0.05	0	Steady	0.00
Independent	1	2,614	0.12	0	Steady	0.00
Write-in	N/A	3,606	0.17	0	Steady	0.00
Total		2,175,409	100.00	67	±0	100.00
Invalid/blank votes		107,451	4.71			
Turnout (out of 3,518,184 eligible voters)		2,282,860	64.89	▼5.22 pp		
Source: Minnesota Secretary of State, Minnesota Legislative Reference Library

== See also ==
- Minnesota House of Representatives election, 2002
- Minnesota gubernatorial election, 2002
