= 2002 Minnesota House of Representatives election =

- November 5, 2002

All 134 seats in the Minnesota House of Representatives 68 seats needed for a majority
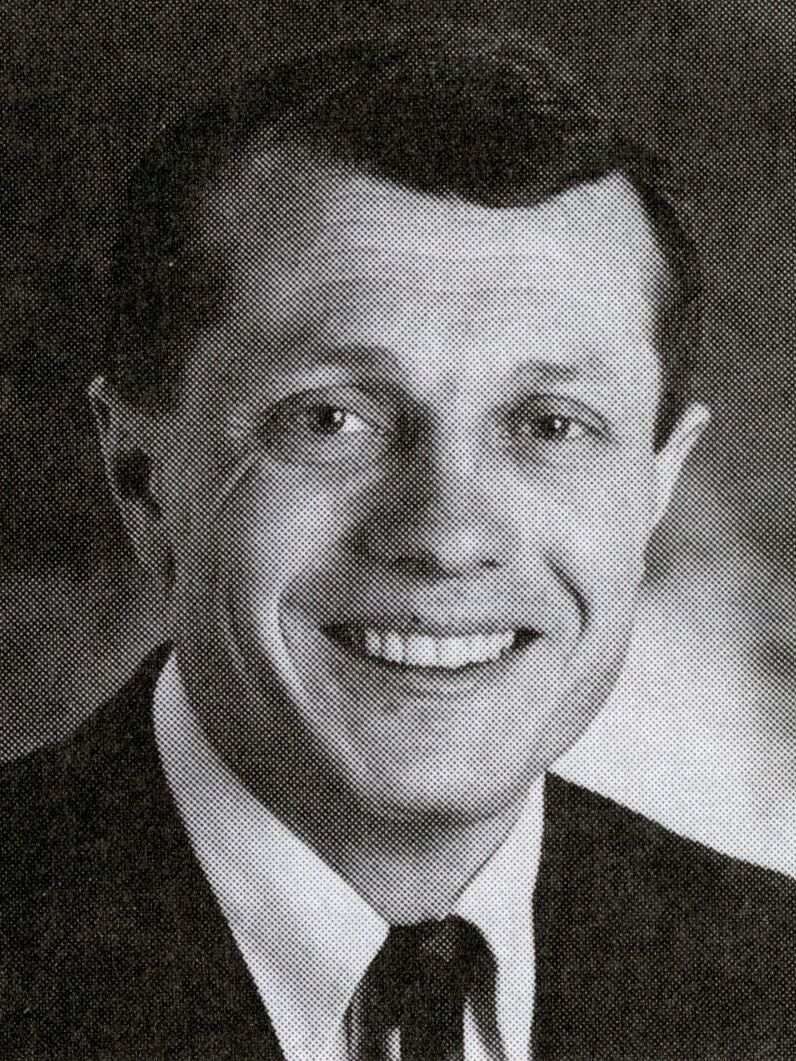
| | Majority party | Minority party |
|---|---|---|
| | | DFL |
| Leader | Steve Sviggum | Tom Pugh |
| Party | Republican | Democratic (DFL) |
| Leader since | April 17, 1992 | January 5, 1999 |
| Leader's seat | 28B–Kenyon | 39A–South St. Paul |
| Last election | 69 seats | 65 seats |
| Seats before | 71 | 63 |
| Seats won | 82 | 52 |
| Seat change | ▲11 | ▼11 |
| Popular vote | 1,062,076 | 1,034,046 |
| Percentage | 49.13% | 47.84% |
| Swing | ▼1.84pp | ▲1.4pp |
Speaker before election
Steve Sviggum
Republican
Elected Speaker
Steve Sviggum
Republican

The 2002 Minnesota House of Representatives election was held in the U.S. state of Minnesota on November 5, 2002, to elect members to the House of Representatives of the 83rd Minnesota Legislature. A primary election was held on September 10, 2002.

The Republican Party of Minnesota won a majority of seats, remaining the majority party, followed by the Minnesota Democratic–Farmer–Labor Party (DFL). The new Legislature convened on January 7, 2003.

== Predictions ==
| Source | Ranking | As of |
|---|---|---|
| The Cook; Political Report | Lean R | October 4, 2002 |

== Results ==
Summary of the November 5, 2002 Minnesota House of Representatives election results
| Party | Candidates | Votes | | Seats | | |
| Party | Candidates | No. | % | No. | ∆No. | % |
|---|---|---|---|---|---|---|
| Republican Party of Minnesota | 129 | 1,062,076 | 49.13 | 82 | ▲11 | 61.19 |
| Minnesota Democratic–Farmer–Labor Party | 131 | 1,034,046 | 47.84 | 52 | ▼11 | 38.81 |
| Independence Party of Minnesota | 26 | 43,530 | 2.01 | 0 | Steady | 0.00 |
| Green Party of Minnesota | 17 | 13,164 | 0.61 | 0 | Steady | 0.00 |
| Constitution Party of Minnesota | 1 | 1,324 | 0.06 | 0 | Steady | 0.00 |
| Independent | 1 | 726 | 0.03 | 0 | Steady | 0.00 |
| Write-in | N/A | 6,703 | 0.31 | 0 | Steady | 0.00 |
| Total | | 2,161,569 | 100.00 | 134 | ±0 | 100.00 |
| Invalid/blank votes | | 121,291 | 5.31 | | | |
| Turnout (out of 3,518,184 eligible voters) | | 2,282,860 | 64.89 | ▼5.22 pp | | |
Source: Minnesota Secretary of State, Minnesota Legislative Reference Library

== See also ==
- Minnesota Senate election, 2002
- Minnesota gubernatorial election, 2002
