= Minnesota House of Representatives =

Lower house of the state legislature of Minnesota, US

Coordinates: 44°57′20″N 93°6′8″W

- 94th Minnesota Legislature

Type
- Type: Lower house of the Minnesota Legislature
- Term limits: None

History
- New session started: January 14, 2025

Leadership
- Speaker: Lisa Demuth (R) since February 6, 2025
- Speaker Pro Tempore: Bjorn Olson (R) since February 6, 2025
- GOP Floor Leader: Harry Niska (R) since February 6, 2025
- DFL Caucus Leader: Zack Stephenson (DFL) since September 9, 2025
- DFL Floor Leader: Jamie Long (DFL) since February 6, 2025

Structure
- Seats: 134
- Political groups: DFL (67); Republican (66); Vacant (1)
- Length of term: 2 years
- Authority: Article IV, Minnesota Constitution
- Salary: $51,750/year + per diem

Elections
- Voting system: First-past-the-post
- Last election: November 5, 2024
- Next election: November 3, 2026
- Redistricting: Legislative control

Meeting place
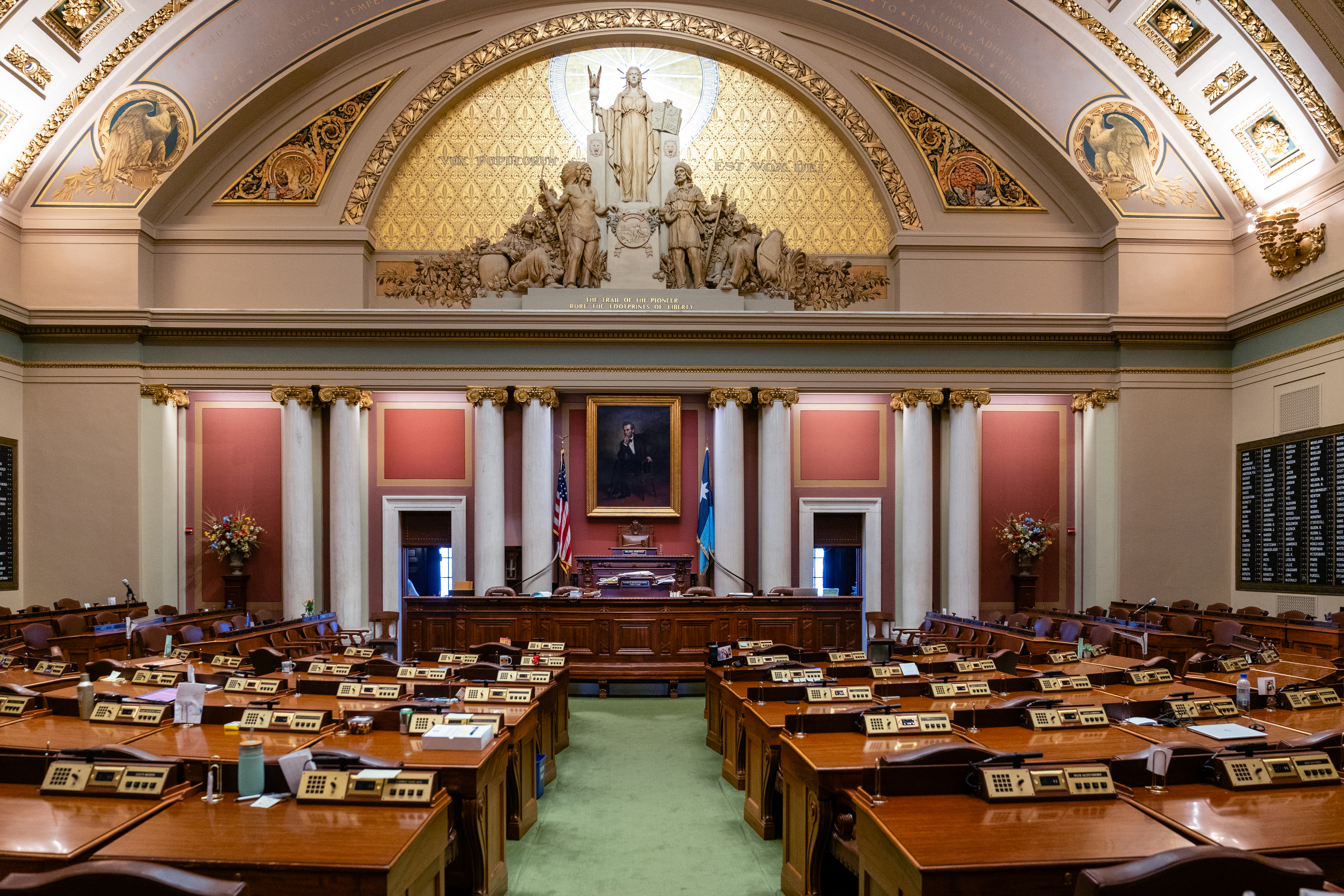
- House of Representatives chamber Minnesota State Capitol; Saint Paul, Minnesota

Website
- house.mn.gov

Rules
- 23–24 Permanent Rules of the House

The Minnesota House of Representatives is the lower chamber of the U.S. state of Minnesota's legislature. It operates in conjunction with the Minnesota Senate, the state's upper chamber, to write and pass legislation, which is then subject to approval by the governor of Minnesota.

Established in 1858, the Minnesota House of Representatives has 134 members elected from single-member districts across the state. Representatives serve two-year terms without term limits, with all seats up for election every two years. The House is led by the Speaker, who is elected by members of the House, while political party leadership is governed by the Majority and Minority Leaders.

The Minnesota House of Representatives meets in the north wing of the State Capitol in Saint Paul. Member and staff offices, as well as most committee hearings, are in the nearby State Office Building.

== History ==
The Minnesota House of Representatives was officially established on May 11, 1858, when Minnesota was admitted as the 32nd state in the Union. It replaced the Minnesota Territorial Legislature. It was formed alongside the Minnesota Senate to create the Minnesota State Legislature, the bicameral legislative body of the state.

In 1913, Minnesota legislators began to be elected on nonpartisan ballots. While campaigning and caucusing, legislators identified themselves as "Liberals" or "Conservatives." In 1973, a law change brought party designations back, beginning with the 1974 Minnesota House of Representatives election.

After the Nineteenth Amendment was ratified in 1920, women were eligible for election to the legislature. In 1922, Mabeth Hurd Paige, Hannah Kempfer, Sue Metzger Dickey Hough, and Myrtle Cain were elected to the House of Representatives. Until Representative Melissa Hortman was assassinated, a record-high 55 women served in the House in 2025.

== Elections ==
Each Minnesota Senate district is divided in half and given the suffix A or B to form a House district (for example, House district 32B is in Senate district 32). Members are elected to two-year terms. Districts are redrawn after the decennial United States Census in time for the primary and general elections in years ending in 2. The most recent election was on November 5, 2024.

== Composition ==
94th Minnesota Legislature (2025–2027)

	Party (Shading indicates majority caucus)		Total	Vacant
	Democratic– Farmer–Labor	Republican	Total	Vacant
End of the previous Legislature	69	64	133	1
Start 2025 (Note: Election of Curtis Johnson (District 40B) was invalidated in court due to residency requirements)	66	67	133	1
March 17, 2025 (Note: DFLer David Gottfried elected to fill the vacancy left by Curtis Johnson's disqualification.)	67	67	134	0
June 14, 2025 (Note: DFL Leader Melissa Hortman (District 34B) assassinated.)	66	67	133	1
September 26, 2025 (Note: DFLer Xp Lee elected to fill the vacancy left by Melissa Hortman's assassination.)	67	67	134	0
November 18, 2025 (Note: DFLer Kaohly Her (District 64A) resigned after being elected mayor of St. Paul. DFLer Amanda Hemmingsen-Jaeger (District 47A) resigned after being elected to the Minnesota Senate.)	65	67	132	2
February 4, 2026 (Note: DFLers Meg Luger-Nikolai and Shelley Buck were seated after their January 28 election to fill the vacancies left by DFLers Kaohly Her and Amanda Hemmingsen-Jaeger.)	67	67	134	0
June 21, 2026 (Note: Republican Joe Schomacker (District 21A) resigned in order to pursue business opportunities.)	67	66	133	1
Latest voting share	50.4%	49.6%		

=== Members, 2025–2027 ===
House districts by party after 2024 election DFL Republican

The 94th Minnesota Legislature began on January 14, 2025. For each major party, 67 representatives were elected, the second ever tie in the Minnesota House. After the election of Curtis Johnson (District 40B) was nullified in court, the session began with 67 Republican members, while the 66 elected DFL members sat out in an effort to deny quorum. On March 11, 2025, David Gottfried (DFL) was elected to the seat, restoring the 67–67 tie. After Gottfried was seated, Melissa Hortman was granted the title "DFL Leader" instead of "Minority Leader", and the two parties entered into a power-sharing agreement. After Hortman's assassination, Zack Stephenson became the House DFL Leader.

District		Name	Party	Residence	First elected
1	A	John Burkel	Republican	Badger	2020
1	B	Steve Gander	Republican	East Grand Forks	2024
2	A	Bidal Duran Jr.	Republican	Bemidji	2024
2	B	Matt Bliss	Republican	Pennington	2016
3	A	Roger Skraba	Republican	Ely	2022
3	B	Natalie Zeleznikar	Republican	Fredenberg Township	2022
4	A	Heather Keeler	DFL	Moorhead	2020
4	B	Jim Joy	Republican	Hawley	2022
5	A	Krista Knudsen	Republican	Lake Shore	2022
5	B	Mike Wiener	Republican	Long Prairie	2022
6	A	Ben Davis	Republican	Merrifield	2022
6	B	Josh Heintzeman	Republican	Nisswa	2014
7	A	Spencer Igo	Republican	Grand Rapids	2020
7	B	Cal Warwas	Republican	Eveleth	2024
8	A	Peter Johnson	DFL	Duluth	2024
8	B	Liish Kozlowski	DFL	Duluth	2022
9	A	Jeff Backer	Republican	Browns Valley	2014
9	B	Tom Murphy	Republican	Underwood	2022
10	A	Ron Kresha	Republican	Little Falls	2012
10	B	Isaac Schultz	Republican	Elmdale Township	2022
11	A	Jeff Dotseth	Republican	Kettle River	2022
11	B	Nathan Nelson	Republican	Hinckley	2019 (Note: Elected in a special election.)
12	A	Paul Anderson	Republican	Starbuck	2008
12	B	Mary Franson	Republican	Alexandria	2010
13	A	Lisa Demuth	Republican	Cold Spring	2018
13	B	Tim O'Driscoll	Republican	Sartell	2010
14	A	Bernie Perryman	Republican	St. Augusta	2022
14	B	Dan Wolgamott	DFL	St. Cloud	2018
15	A	Chris Swedzinski	Republican	Ghent	2010
15	B	Paul Torkelson	Republican	Hanska	2008
16	A	Scott Van Binsbergen	Republican	Montevideo	2024
16	B	Dave Baker	Republican	Willmar	2014
17	A	Dawn Gillman	Republican	Dassel	2022
17	B	Bobbie Harder	Republican	Henderson	2022
18	A	Erica Schwartz	Republican	Nicollet	2024
18	B	Luke Frederick	DFL	Mankato	2020
19	A	Keith Allen	Republican	Kenyon	2024
19	B	Thomas Sexton	Republican	Waseca	2024
20	A	Pam Altendorf	Republican	Red Wing	2022
20	B	Steven Jacob	Republican	Altura	2022
21	A	Vacant			
21	B	Marj Fogelman	Republican	Fulda	2022
22	A	Bjorn Olson	Republican	Elmore	2020
22	B	Terry Stier	Republican	Belle Plaine	2024
23	A	Peggy Bennett	Republican	Albert Lea	2014
23	B	Patricia Mueller	Republican	Austin	2020
24	A	Duane Quam	Republican	Byron	2010
24	B	Tina Liebling	DFL	Rochester	2004
25	A	Kim Hicks	DFL	Rochester	2022
25	B	Andy Smith	DFL	Rochester	2022
26	A	Aaron Repinski	Republican	Winona	2024
26	B	Greg Davids	Republican	Preston	1991 (Note: Elected in a special election. Lost re-election in 2006. Elected again in 2008.)
27	A	Shane Mekeland	Republican	Clear Lake	2018
27	B	Bryan Lawrence	Republican	Princeton	2024
28	A	Jimmy Gordon	Republican	Isanti	2024
28	B	Max Rymer	Republican	North Branch	2024
29	A	Joe McDonald	Republican	Delano	2010
29	B	Marion O'Neill	Republican	Maple Lake	2012
30	A	Walter Hudson	Republican	Albertville	2022
30	B	Paul Novotny	Republican	Elk River	2020
31	A	Harry Niska	Republican	Ramsey	2022
31	B	Peggy Scott	Republican	Andover	2008
32	A	Nolan West	Republican	Blaine	2016
32	B	Matt Norris	DFL	Blaine	2022
33	A	Patti Anderson	Republican	Dellwood	2022
33	B	Josiah Hill	DFL	Stillwater	2022
34	A	Danny Nadeau	Republican	Rogers	2022
34	B	Xp Lee	DFL	Brooklyn Park	2025
35	A	Zack Stephenson	DFL	Coon Rapids	2018
35	B	Kari Rehrauer	DFL	Coon Rapids	2024
36	A	Elliott Engen	Republican	White Bear Township	2022
36	B	Brion Curran	DFL	Vadnais Heights	2022
37	A	Kristin Robbins	Republican	Maple Grove	2018
37	B	Kristin Bahner	DFL	Maple Grove	2018
38	A	Huldah Hiltsley	DFL	Brooklyn Park	2024
38	B	Samantha Vang	DFL	Brooklyn Center	2018
39	A	Erin Koegel	DFL	Spring Lake Park	2016
39	B	Sandra Feist	DFL	New Brighton	2020
40	A	Kelly Moller	DFL	Shoreview	2018
40	B	David Gottfried	DFL	Shoreview	2025
41	A	Wayne Johnson	Republican	Cottage Grove	2024
41	B	Tom Dippel	Republican	Cottage Grove	2024
42	A	Ned Carroll	DFL	Plymouth	2022
42	B	Ginny Klevorn	DFL	Plymouth	2018
43	A	Cedrick Frazier	DFL	New Hope	2020
43	B	Mike Freiberg	DFL	Golden Valley	2012
44	A	Peter Fischer	DFL	Maplewood	2012
44	B	Leon Lillie	DFL	North St. Paul	2004
45	A	Andrew Myers	Republican	Minnetonka Beach	2022
45	B	Patty Acomb	DFL	Minnetonka	2018
46	A	Larry Kraft	DFL	St. Louis Park	2022
46	B	Cheryl Youakim	DFL	Hopkins	2014
47	A	Shelley Buck	DFL	Woodbury	2026
47	B	Ethan Cha	DFL	Woodbury	2022
48	A	Jim Nash	Republican	Waconia	2014
48	B	Lucy Rehm	DFL	Chanhassen	2022
49	A	Alex Falconer	DFL	Eden Prairie	2024
49	B	Carlie Kotyza-Witthuhn	DFL	Eden Prairie	2018
50	A	Julie Greene	DFL	Edina	2024
50	B	Steve Elkins	DFL	Bloomington	2018
51	A	Michael Howard	DFL	Richfield	2018
51	B	Nathan Coulter	DFL	Bloomington	2022
52	A	Liz Reyer	DFL	Eagan	2020
52	B	Bianca Virnig	DFL	Eagan	2023
53	A	Mary Frances Clardy	DFL	Inver Grove Heights	2022
53	B	Rick Hansen	DFL	South St. Paul	2004
54	A	Brad Tabke	DFL	Shakopee	2018 (Note: Lost re-election in 2020. Elected again in 2022.)
54	B	Ben Bakeberg	Republican	Jordan	2022
55	A	Jessica Hanson	DFL	Burnsville	2020
55	B	Kaela Berg	DFL	Burnsville	2020
56	A	Robert Bierman	DFL	Apple Valley	2018
56	B	John Huot	DFL	Rosemount	2018
57	A	Jon Koznick	Republican	Lakeville	2014
57	B	Jeff Witte	Republican	Lakeville	2022
58	A	Kristi Pursell	DFL	Northfield	2022
58	B	Drew Roach	Republican	Farmington	2024
59	A	Fue Lee	DFL	Minneapolis	2016
59	B	Esther Agbaje	DFL	Minneapolis	2020
60	A	Sydney Jordan	DFL	Minneapolis	2020
60	B	Mohamud Noor	DFL	Minneapolis	2018
61	A	Katie Jones	DFL	Minneapolis	2024
61	B	Jamie Long	DFL	Minneapolis	2018
62	A	Anquam Mahamoud	DFL	Minneapolis	2024
62	B	Aisha Gomez	DFL	Minneapolis	2018
63	A	Samantha Sencer-Mura	DFL	Minneapolis	2022
63	B	Emma Greenman	DFL	Minneapolis	2020
64	A	Meg Luger-Nikolai	DFL	Saint Paul	2026
64	B	Dave Pinto	DFL	Saint Paul	2014
65	A	Samakab Hussein	DFL	Saint Paul	2022
65	B	María Isa Pérez-Vega	DFL	Saint Paul	2022
66	A	Leigh Finke	DFL	Saint Paul	2022
66	B	Athena Hollins	DFL	Saint Paul	2020
67	A	Liz Lee	DFL	Saint Paul	2022
67	B	Jay Xiong	DFL	Saint Paul	2018

== Historical composition ==
DFL / R
1986	83 / 51
1988	81 / 53
1990	80 / 54
1992	87 / 47
1994	71 / 63
1996	70 / 64
1998	63 / 71
2000	65 / 69
2002	52 / 82
2004	66 / 68
2006	85 / 49
2008	87 / 47
2010	62 / 72
2012	73 / 61
2014	62 / 72
2016	57 / 77
2018	75 / 59
2020	70 / 64
2022	70 / 64
2024	67 / 67

== Past notable members ==
=== U.S. senators from Minnesota ===
- Wendell R. Anderson, U.S. senator from Minnesota (1976–1978); 33rd governor of Minnesota (1971–1976)
- Cushman Kellogg Davis, U.S. senator from Minnesota (1887–1900); 7th governor of Minnesota (1874–1876)
- Alonzo J. Edgerton, U.S. senator from Minnesota (1881–1881)
- Magnus Johnson, U.S. senator from Minnesota (1923–1925); U.S. representative from Minnesota's general ticket Seat Five district (1933–1935)
- Ernest Lundeen, U.S. senator from Minnesota (1937–1940); U.S. representative from Minnesota's 3rd district (1917–1919); U.S. representative from Minnesota's general ticket Seat Eight district (1933–1935); U.S. representative from Minnesota's 3rd district (1935–1937)
- Dwight M. Sabin, U.S. senator from Minnesota (1883–1889); Chair of the Republican National Committee (1883–1884)
- William D. Washburn, U.S. senator from Minnesota (1889–1895); U.S. representative from Minnesota's 3rd district (1879–1883) and 4th district (1883–1885)

=== Governors of Minnesota ===
- Wendell R. Anderson, U.S. senator from Minnesota (1976–1978); 33rd governor of Minnesota (1971–1976)
- Joseph A. A. Burnquist, 19th governor of Minnesota (1915–1921); 20th lieutenant governor of Minnesota (1913–1915); 21st attorney general of Minnesota (1939–1955)
- Arne Carlson, 37th governor of Minnesota (1991–1999); 14th auditor of Minnesota (1979–1991)
- Cushman Kellogg Davis, U.S. senator from Minnesota (1887–1900); 7th governor of Minnesota (1874–1876)
- William Rush Merriam, 11th governor of Minnesota (1889–1893)
- Stephen Miller, 4th governor of Minnesota (1864–1866)
- Tim Pawlenty, 39th governor of Minnesota (2003–2011)
- Hjalmar Petersen, 23rd governor of Minnesota (1936–1937); 28th lieutenant governor of Minnesota
- Samuel Rinnah Van Sant, 15th governor of Minnesota (1901–1905)

=== Lieutenant governors of Minnesota ===
- Henry M. Arens, 26th lieutenant governor of Minnesota (1931–1933); U.S. representative from Minnesota's General Ticket Seat One district (1933–1935)
- Thomas H. Armstrong, 5th lieutenant governor of Minnesota (1866–1870)
- Alphonso Barto; 7th lieutenant governor of Minnesota (1874–1876)
- Frank A. Day, 13th lieutenant governor of Minnesota (1895–1897)
- Ignatius L. Donnelly, 2nd lieutenant governor of Minnesota (1860–1863); U.S. representative from Minnesota's 2nd district (1863–1869)
- Peggy Flanagan, 50th lieutenant governor of Minnesota (2019–present)
- John L. Gibbs, 14th lieutenant governor of Minnesota (1897–1899)
- Charles A. Gilman, 9th lieutenant governor of Minnesota (1880–1887)
- Samuel Y. Gordon, 19th lieutenant governor of Minnesota (1911–1913)
- Carol Molnau, 46th lieutenant governor of Minnesota (2003–2011)
- William I. Nolan, 26th lieutenant governor of Minnesota (1925–1929); U.S. representative from Minnesota's 5th district (1929–1933)
- Charles D. Sherwood, 4th lieutenant governor of Minnesota (1864–1866)
- Konrad K. Solberg, 27th lieutenant governor of Minnesota (1933–1935)
- James Wakefield, 9th lieutenant governor of Minnesota (1876–1880); U.S. representative from Minnesota's 2nd district (1883–1887)
- William H. Yale, 6th lieutenant governor of Minnesota (1870–1874)

=== Attorneys general of Minnesota ===
- Joseph A. A. Burnquist, 19th governor of Minnesota (1915–1921); 20th lieutenant governor of Minnesota (1913–1915); 21st attorney general of Minnesota (1939–1955)
- Gordon E. Cole, 2nd attorney general of Minnesota (1860–1866)
- William J. Colvill, 3rd attorney general of Minnesota (1866–1888); Union colonel during the U.S. Civil War (1861–1863)
- Francis R. E. Cornell, 4th attorney general of Minnesota (1868–1874)
- Wallace B. Douglas, 10th attorney general of Minnesota (1899–1904)
- Keith Ellison, 30th attorney general of Minnesota (2019–present); U.S. representative from Minnesota's 5th district (2007–2019); deputy chair of the Democratic National Committee (2017–2018)
- Douglas M. Head, 25th attorney general of Minnesota (1967–1971)
- Albert F. Pratt, 16th attorney general of Minnesota (1927–1928)
- George P. Wilson, 5th attorney general of Minnesota (1874–1880)
- Edward T. Young 12th attorney general of Minnesota (1905–1909)

=== Treasurers of Minnesota ===
- Joseph Bobleter, 8th treasurer of Minnesota (1887–1895)
- Carl A. Halverson, 18th treasurer of Minnesota (1937–1939)
- August T. Koerner, 9th treasurer of Minnesota (1895–1901)
- Emil D. Munch, 3rd treasurer of Minnesota (1868–1872)
- William Pfaender, 6th treasurer of Minnesota (1876–1880)
- Henry Rines 15th treasurer of Minnesota (1917–1925)
- Edward W. Stark, 16th treasurer of Minnesota (1925–1927)

=== U.S. representatives from Minnesota ===
- Henry M. Arens, 26th lieutenant governor of Minnesota (1931–1933); U.S. representative from Minnesota's General Ticket Seat One district (1933–1935)
- Ignatius L. Donnelly, 2nd lieutenant governor of Minnesota (1860–1863); U.S. representative from Minnesota's 2nd district (1863–1869)
- Keith Ellison, 30th attorney general of Minnesota (2019–present); U.S. representative from Minnesota's 5th district (2007–2019); deputy chair of the Democratic National Committee (2017–2018)
- Tom Emmer, U.S. House of Representatives majority whip (2023–present); chair of the National Republican Congressional Committee (2019–2023); U.S. representative from Minnesota's 6th district (2015–present)
- Arlen Erdahl, 18th secretary of state of Minnesota (1971–1975); U.S. representative from Minnesota's 1st district (1979–1983)
- Brad Finstad, U.S. representative from Minnesota's 1st district (2022–present)
- Gil Gutknecht, U.S. representative from Minnesota's 1st district (1995–2007)
- Magnus Johnson, U.S. senator from Minnesota (1923–1925); U.S. representative from Minnesota's general ticket Seat Five district (1933–1935)
- Ernest Lundeen, U.S. senator from Minnesota (1937–1940); U.S. representative from Minnesota's 3rd district (1917–1919); U.S. representative from Minnesota's general ticket Seat Eight district (1933–1935); U.S. representative from Minnesota's 3rd district (1935–1937)
- Betty McCollum, U.S. representative from Minnesota's 4th district (2001–present)
- Rick Nolan, U.S. representative from Minnesota's 8th district (2013–2019); 6th district (1975–1981)
- William I. Nolan, 26th lieutenant governor of Minnesota (1925–1929); U.S. representative from Minnesota's 5th district (1929–1933)
- Erik Paulsen, U.S. representative from Minnesota's 3rd district (2009–2019)
- James Wakefield, 9th lieutenant governor of Minnesota (1876–1880); U.S. representative from Minnesota's 2nd district (1883–1887)
- William D. Washburn, U.S. senator from Minnesota (1889–1895); U.S. representative from Minnesota's 3rd district (1879–1883) and 4th district (1883–1885)
- Thomas Wilson, U.S. representative from Minnesota's 1st district (1887–1889); Chief justice of the supreme court of Minnesota (1865–1869); associate justice of the supreme court of Minnesota (1864–1865)

=== Others ===
- Francis Baasen, 1st secretary of state of Minnesota (1858–1860)
- Robert C. Dunn, 6th auditor of Minnesota (1895–1903)
- Joan Growe, 19th secretary of state of Minnesota (1975–1999)
- Samuel G. Iverson, 7th auditor of Minnesota (1903–1915)
- Mary Kiffmeyer, 20th secretary of state of Minnesota (1999–2007)
- William O'Brien, 11th auditor of Minnesota (1969–1971)
- Rebecca Otto, 18th auditor of Minnesota (2007–2019)
- Steve Simon, 22nd secretary of state of Minnesota (2015–present)

== See also ==
- Minnesota Senate
- Minnesota Legislature
- Political party strength in Minnesota
- List of speakers of the Minnesota House of Representatives
- List of Minnesota state legislatures
