= 2021 Minneapolis mayoral election =

- November 2, 2021
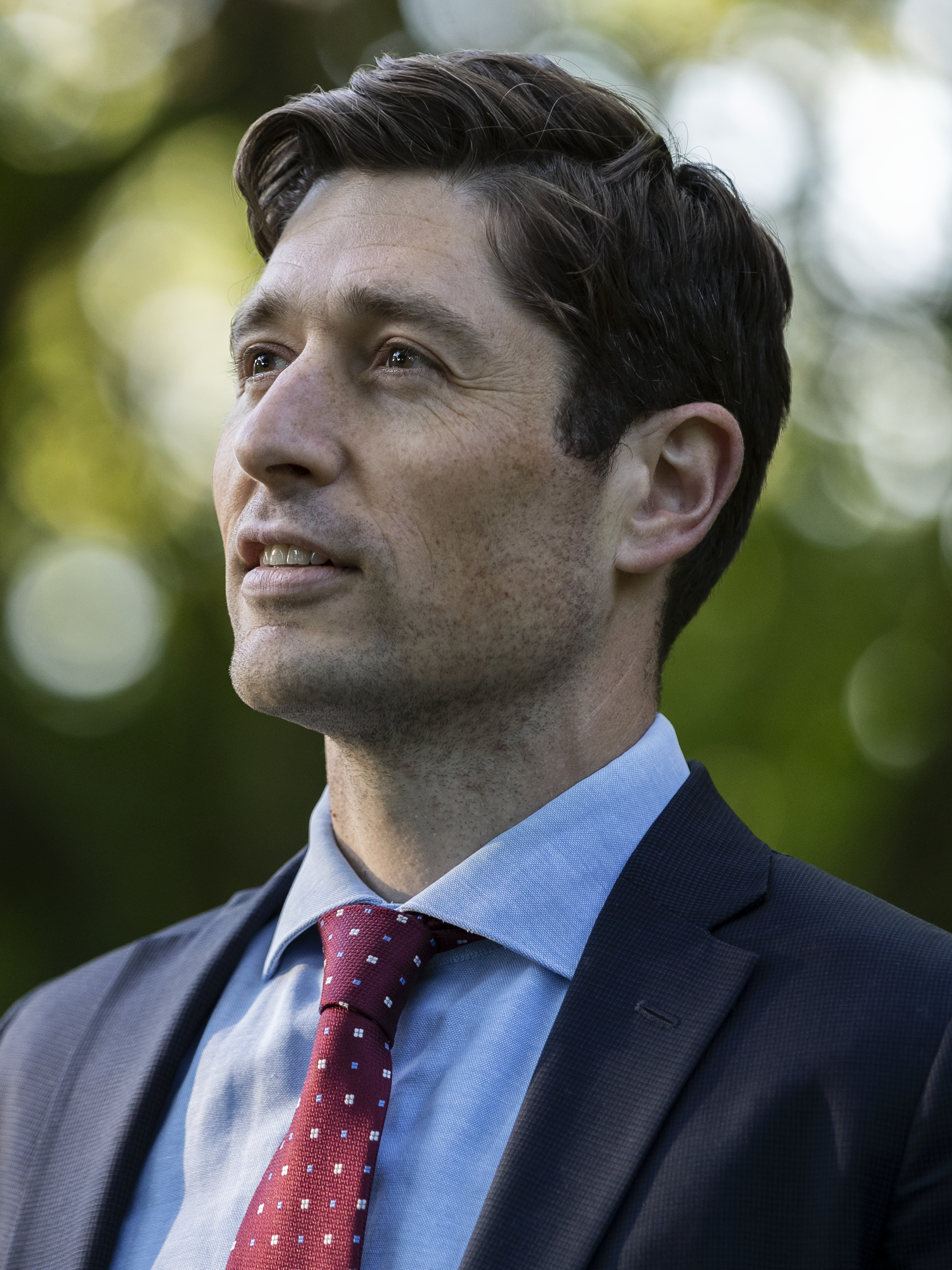

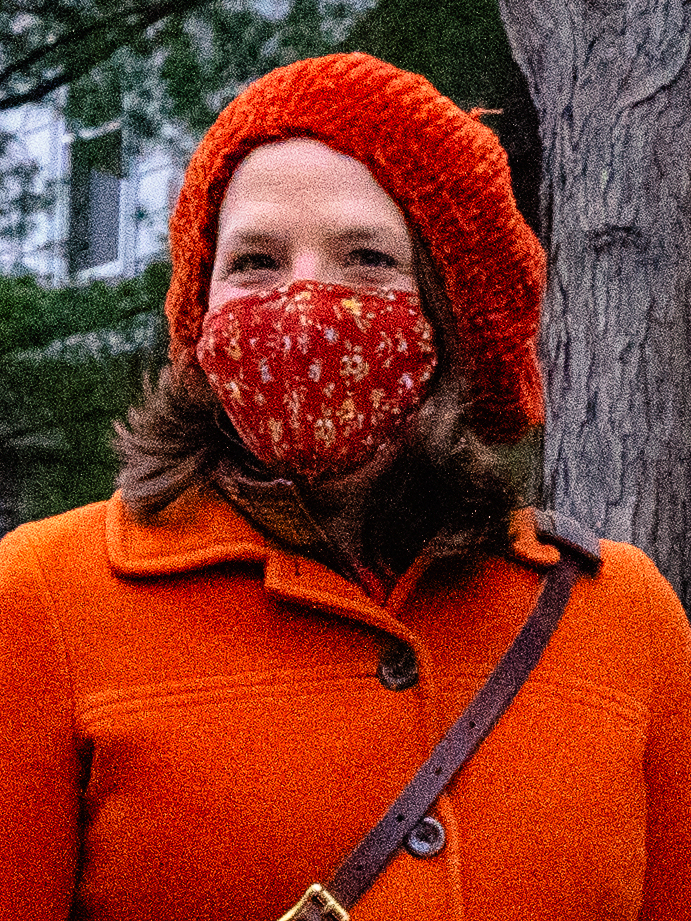

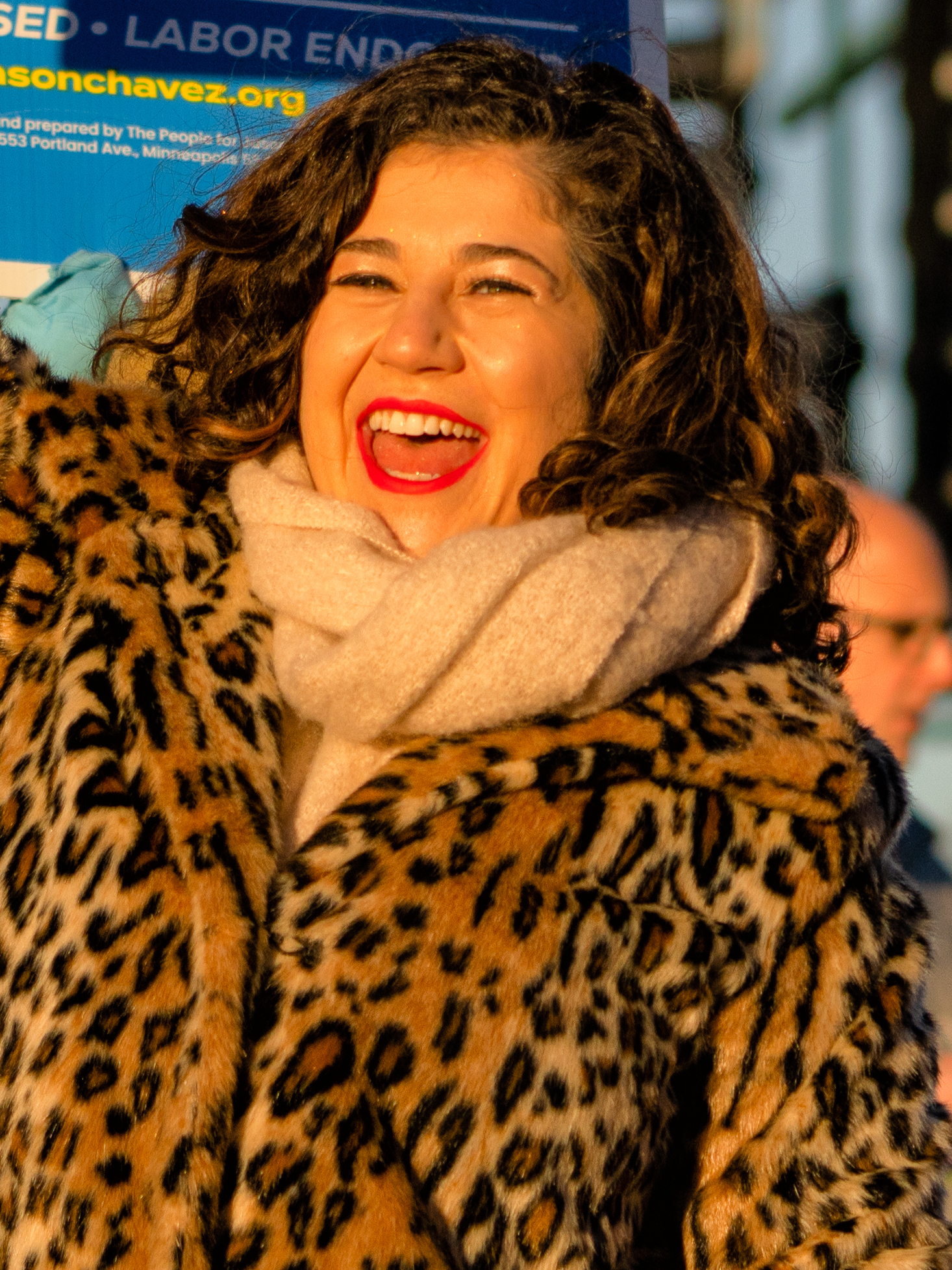
| Candidate | Jacob Frey | Kate Knuth | Sheila Nezhad |
| Party | Democratic (DFL) | Democratic (DFL) | Democratic (DFL) |
| First round | 61,468; 42.80% | 26,468; 18.38% | 30,368; 21.09% |
| Final round | 70,669; 56.23% | 55,007; 43.77% | Eliminated |
- First preference votes by ward Frey: 30–34% 35–39% 40–44% 45–49% 50–54% 55–59% 60–64% Nezhad: 30–34% 35–39% 40–44% 45–49% 50–54% Knuth: 30–34% Awed: 40–44% 55–59%
Mayor before election
Jacob Frey
Democratic (DFL)
Elected Mayor
Jacob Frey
Democratic (DFL)

A mayoral election was held on November 2, 2021, to elect the mayor of the U.S. city of Minneapolis. Incumbent DFL mayor Jacob Frey won reelection to a second term, becoming the first Minneapolis mayor to win a second term since R. T. Rybak in 2005. Minneapolis mayoral elections use instant-runoff voting, also known as ranked-choice voting. All candidates appear on the same ballot and there is no primary election of candidates. Nor is there a subsequent runoff election - the ranked ballot allow votes to be transferred without asking voters to vote again. Minneapolis's twin city, Saint Paul, also held a mayoral election on the same day, using the same system. Under Minneapolis's use of IRV, Frey won because at the end he had a majority of the votes still in play.

The election came in the wake of a tumultuous period for Minneapolis, deeply affected by the murder of George Floyd and subsequent civil unrest. Frey's campaign faced challenges from a crowded field of candidates, including former state Representative Kate Knuth and community organizer Sheila Nezhad. Both Knuth and Nezhad aligned with more progressive factions within the DFL and advocated for policing reforms and formed an alliance urging their supporters to rank them as their top choices and exclude Frey from their preferences.

The election also featured discussions on issues such as affordable housing, climate change, and economic recovery post-COVID-19 lockdowns.

== Background ==
=== 2017 election ===
Frey announced his candidacy for mayor of Minneapolis on January 3, 2017, and won the November 7 election. He was sworn into office on January 2, 2018.

Frey is Minneapolis's second Jewish mayor, and its second-youngest after Al Hofstede, who was 34 when he was elected in 1973. Frey campaigned on a platform of increasing support for affordable housing and improving police-community relations.

== Candidates ==
=== Declared ===
- Nate "Honey Badger" Atkins (Libertarian), unconventional Libertarian
- A. J. Awed (DFL), co-executive director of the Cedar-Riverside Community Council
- Troy Benjegerdes (DFL), software engineer and candidate for mayor in 2013 and 2017
- Bob Carney (Republican)
- Clint Conner (DFL), attorney and social justice advocate
- Christopher David (DFL)
- Jacob Frey (DFL), incumbent mayor
- Mark Globus (DFL), attorney and business leader
- Marcus Harcus (Grassroots–Legalize Cannabis), executive director of the Minnesota Campaign for Full Legalization
- Paul Johnson (Humanitarian-Community Party)
- Kate Knuth (DFL), educator and former state representative
- Doug Nelson (Socialist Workers)
- Sheila June Nezhad (DFL), community organizer
- Jerrell Perry (For the People Party)
- Laverne Turner (Republican), political advisor
- Kevin Ward (Independent)
- Mike Winter (Independence), commercial driver, podcast host, and Teamster Union steward

=== Withdrew ===
- David Tilsen (DFL), former Minneapolis School Board member (endorsed Nezhad)
- Philip Sturm (DFL), U.S. Marine Corps veteran

== Endorsements ==
Seven DFL members of the Minnesota State Legislature signed a letter urging Minneapolis residents not to reelect Frey and to instead elect a new mayor who would fight racial discrimination while improving public safety. The legislators who signed the letter were senators Scott Dibble and Omar Fateh and representatives Esther Agbaje, Jim Davnie, Aisha Gomez, Emma Greenman, and Hodan Hassan. The letter stops short of endorsing any specific candidate, but Agbaje, Davnie, Dibble, and Greenman separately endorsed Knuth. Gomez endorsed both Nezhad and Knuth.

Jacob Frey (incumbent, DFL)

Federal officials

- Amy Klobuchar, U.S. Senator from Minnesota

Statewide officials

- Tim Walz, incumbent Governor of Minnesota (2019-present)
- Keith Ellison, Attorney General of Minnesota (2019–present); U.S. Representative from MN-05 (2007–2019)

Local officials

- Sharon Sayles Belton, former Mayor of Minneapolis (1994-2001)

Labor unions

- American Federation of State, County, and Municipal Employees Council 5
- International Union of Painters and Allied Trades DC 82
- Minneapolis Firefighters Local 82
- Service Employees International Union Minnesota State Council
- Teamsters Joint Council 32
Kate Knuth (DFL)

U.S. representatives

- Ilhan Omar, U.S. Representative from MN-05 (2019–present) (dual endorsement with Sheila Nezhad)

State legislators

- Esther Agbaje, Minnesota state representative from District 59A
- Karen Clark, former Minnesota state senator from District 62A
- Jim Davnie, Minnesota state representative from District 63A
- Scott Dibble, Minnesota state senator from District 61
- Aisha Gomez, Minnesota state representative from District 62B (dual endorsement with Sheila Nezhad)
- Emma Greenman, Minnesota state representative from District 63B
- Erin Murphy, Minnesota state senator from District 64 and former DFL House Majority Leader
- Jean Wagenius, former Minnesota state representative from District 63B

Local officials

- Lisa Bender, Minneapolis City Council President
- Brad Bourn, Minneapolis Park Board Commissioner
- Alondra Cano, Minneapolis City Council Member
- Steve Fletcher, Minneapolis City Council Member
- Phillipe Cunningham, Minneapolis City Council Member (dual endorsement with Sheila Nezhad)
- Cam Gordon, Minneapolis City Council Member (Green)
- Jeremiah Ellison, Minneapolis City Council Member (dual endorsement with Sheila Nezhad)
- Jeremy Schroeder, Minneapolis City Council Member

Party caucuses

- Minnesota DFL Environmental Caucus

Organizations

- 350 Action Minnesota (dual endorsement with Sheila Nezhad)
- OutFront Minnesota Action (second choice)
- Sierra Club Minneapolis Political Committee
- TakeAction Minnesota (dual endorsement with Sheila Nezhad)
Sheila Nezhad (DFL)

U.S. representatives

- Ilhan Omar, U.S. Representative from MN-05 (2019–present) (dual endorsement with Kate Knuth)

State legislators

- Aisha Gomez, Minnesota state representative from District 62B (dual endorsement with Kate Knuth)

Local officials

- Phillipe Cunningham, Minneapolis City Council Member (dual endorsement with Kate Knuth)
- Jeremiah Ellison, Minneapolis City Council Member (dual endorsement with Kate Knuth)

Party caucuses

- Minnesota Young DFL

Organizations

- 350 Action Minnesota (dual endorsement with Kate Knuth)
- Clean Water Action
- LGBTQ Victory Fund
- Minnesota Stonewall Democrats
- National Iranian American Council Action
- OutFront Minnesota Action (first choice)
- Run for Something
  1. VOTEPROCHOICE
- TakeAction Minnesota (dual endorsement with Kate Knuth)
- Twin Cities Democratic Socialists of America
- Twin Cities Mutual Aid Project
Nate "Honey Badger" Atkins (L)

Individuals

- Spike Cohen, 2020 vice presidential candidate for the Libertarian Party
- Larry Sharpe, activist, political candidate

Party caucuses

- Minnesota Legal Marijuana Now Party
- Libertarian Party of Minnesota
- Mises Caucus
No endorsement

Party caucuses

- Minneapolis DFL

== Fundraising ==
Campaign finance reports (1/1/2021–7/27/2021)
| Candidate (Note: The following candidates filed campaign finance reports with Hennepin County. Doug Nelson and Kevin Ward did not file a report, and thus are not listed.) | Total raised | Expenses | Cash on hand |
|---|---|---|---|
| Nate Atkins | $13,041 | $10,616 | $2,424 |
| A. J. Awed | $263,005 | $235,464 | $27,598 |
| Troy Benjegerdes | $0 | $0 | $0 |
| Bob Carney | $0 | $0 | $0 |
| Clint Conner | $60,450 | $45,589 | $14,860 |
| Christopher David | $912 | $712 | $200 |
| Jacob Frey | $676,271 | $754,283 | $155,767 |
| Mark Globus | $25,420 | $23,413 | $2,006 |
| Marcus Harcus | $0 | $0 | $0 |
| Paul Johnson | $3,225 | $2,305 | $919 |
| Kate Knuth | $227,505 | $179,710 | $47,795 |
| Sheila Nezhad | $231,501 | $186,529 | $49,667 |
| Jerrell Perry | $4,564 | $3,983 | $581 |
| Laverne Turner | $1,830 | $1,042 | $753 |
| Mike Winter | $150 | $150 | $0 |

== Polling ==
| Poll source | Date(s) administered | Sample size (Note: Key: A – all adults RV – registered voters LV – likely voters V – unclear) | Margin of error | RCV count | A. J. Awed | Jacob Frey | Kate Knuth | Sheila Nezhad | Others | Exhausted ballots | Undecided |
|---|---|---|---|---|---|---|---|---|---|---|---|
| ALG Research (D) (Note: This poll was sponsored by All of Mpls, which supports Frey) | October 16–19, 2021 | 600 (LV) | ± 4.0% | 1 | 3% | 44% | 10% | 25% | 4% | – | 13% |
| ALG Research (D) | October 16–19, 2021 | 600 (LV) | ± 4.0% | 3 | – | 45% | 12% | 26% | – | 4% | 13% |
| ALG Research (D) | October 16–19, 2021 | 600 (LV) | ± 4.0% | 4 | – | 47% | – | 27% | – | 12% | 13% |

== Results ==
2021 Minneapolis mayoral general election
| Candidate | Round 1 | | Round 2 | |
| Candidate | Votes | % | Votes | % |
|---|---|---|---|---|
| Jacob Frey (incumbent) | 61,620 | 42.8% | 70,669 | 49.1% |
| Sheila June Nezhad | 30,368 | 21.1% | Eliminated | |
| Kate Knuth | 26,468 | 18.4% | 55,007 | 38.2% |
| A. J. Awed | 6,860 | 4.8% | Eliminated | |
| Laverne Turner | 4,620 | 3.2% | Eliminated | |
| Clint Conner | 4,309 | 3% | Eliminated | |
| Bob Carney | 2,788 | 1.9% | Eliminated | |
| Marcus Harcus | 1,189 | 0.8% | Eliminated | |
| Nate Atkins | 1,179 | 0.8% | Eliminated | |
| Mark Globus | 1,158 | 0.8% | Eliminated | |
| Doug Nelson | 739 | 0.5% | Eliminated | |
| Jerrell Perry | 687 | 0.5% | Eliminated | |
| Mike Winter | 642 | 0.4% | Eliminated | |
| Christopher David | 493 | 0.3% | Eliminated | |
| Kevin Ward | 282 | 0.2% | Eliminated | |
| Paul Johnson | 243 | 0.2% | Eliminated | |
| Troy Benjegerdes | 184 | 0.1% | Eliminated | |
| Write-ins | 145 | 0.1% | Eliminated | |
| Exhausted ballots | —N/a | | 18,298 | 12.7% |
| Total | 143,974 | 100.0% | 143,974 | 100.0% |

Alluvial diagram of vote-preference distribution

2021 Minneapolis mayoral general election
| Party | Candidate | Maximum round | Maximum votes | Share in maximum round | Maximum votes First round votes Transfer votes |
|---|---|---|---|---|---|
| Democratic (DFL) | Jacob Frey (incumbent) | 2 | 70,669 | 56.2% | |
| Democratic (DFL) | Kate Knuth | 2 | 55,007 | 43.8% | |
| Democratic (DFL) | Sheila Nezhad | 1 | 30,368 | 21.1% | |
| Democratic (DFL) | A.J. Awed | 1 | 6,860 | 4.8% | |
| Republican | Laverne Turner | 1 | 4,620 | 3.2% | |
| Democratic (DFL) | Clint Conner | 1 | 4,309 | 3.0% | |
| Republican | Bob Carney | 1 | 2,788 | 1.9% | |
| Grassroots—LC | Marcus Harcus | 1 | 1,189 | 0.8% | |
| Libertarian | Nate Atkins | 1 | 1,179 | 0.8% | |
| Democratic (DFL) | Mark Globus | 1 | 1,158 | 0.8% | |
| Socialist Workers | Doug Nelson | 1 | 739 | 0.5% | |
| For the People | Jerrell Perry | 1 | 687 | 0.5% | |
| Independence | Mike Winter | 1 | 642 | 0.4% | |
| Democratic (DFL) | Christopher David | 1 | 493 | 0.3% | |
| Independent | Kevin Ward | 1 | 282 | 0.2% | |
| Humanitarian-Community | Paul Johnson | 1 | 243 | 0.2% | |
| Democratic (DFL) | Troy Benjegerdes | 1 | 184 | 0.1% | |
| Write-in | | 1 | 145 | 0.1% | |

== Notes ==
Partisan clients

== See also ==
- 2021 Minneapolis municipal election
- 2021 Minneapolis Question 2
