= Zaynab Mohamed =

American politician (born 1997)

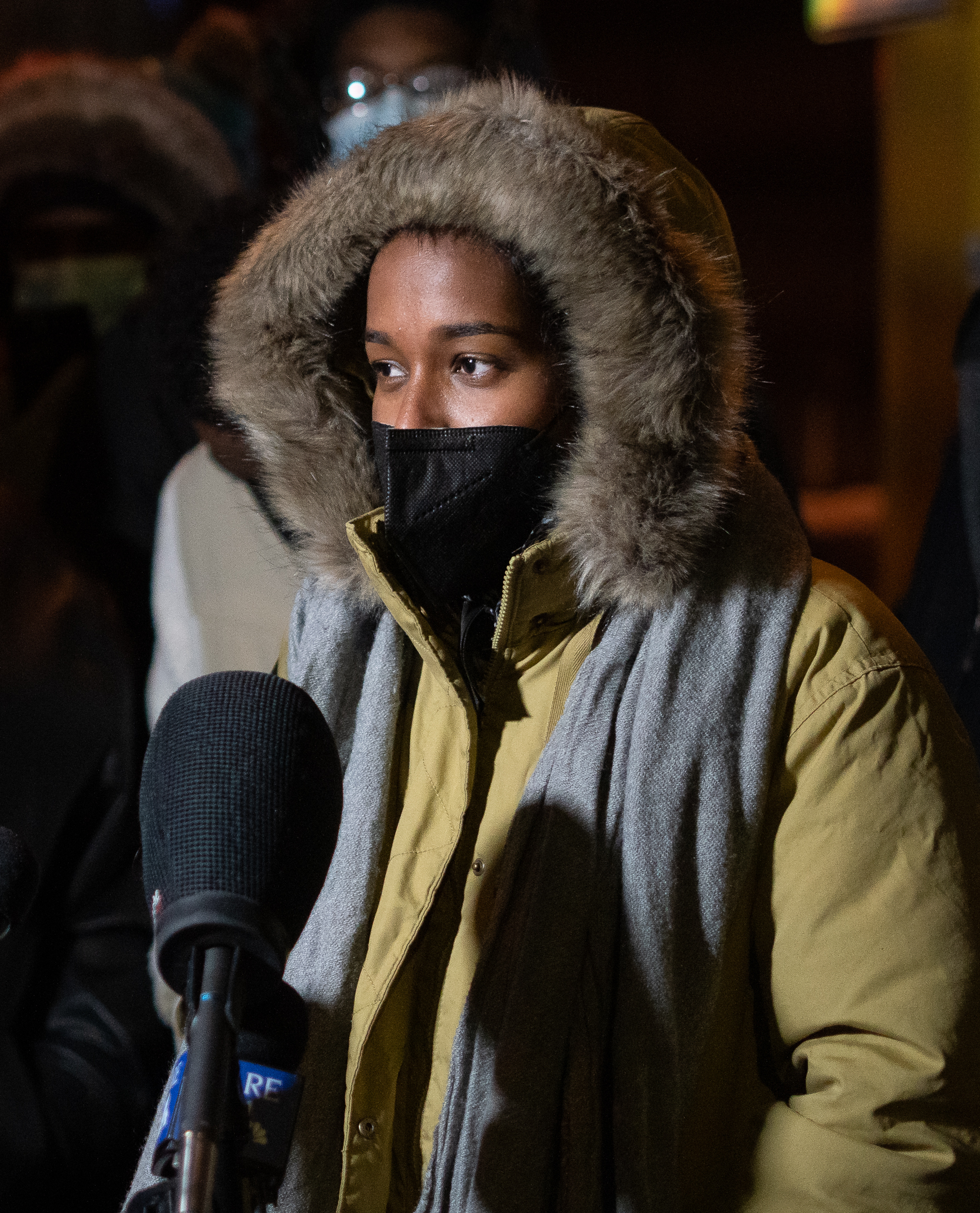
- Mohamed in 2022

Member of the Minnesota Senate from the 63rd district
- Incumbent
- Assumed office January 3, 2023
- Preceded by: Patricia Torres Ray

Personal details
- Born: May 4, 1997 (age 29) Somalia
- Party: Democratic (DFL)
- Relatives: Omar Fateh (brother-in-law)
- Education: University of Minnesota (BA)
- Website: State Senate website Campaign website

Zaynab M. Mohamed (born May 3, 1997) is an American politician serving as a member of the Minnesota State Senate since 2023. A member of the Minnesota Democratic–Farmer–Labor Party (DFL), she represents District 63, comprising southeast Minneapolis.

== Early life and education ==
Mohamed immigrated with her family at age nine from Somalia to Minneapolis's Powderhorn neighborhood, where she grew up. In 2019, she graduated from the University of Minnesota with a degree in human resources.

== Career ==
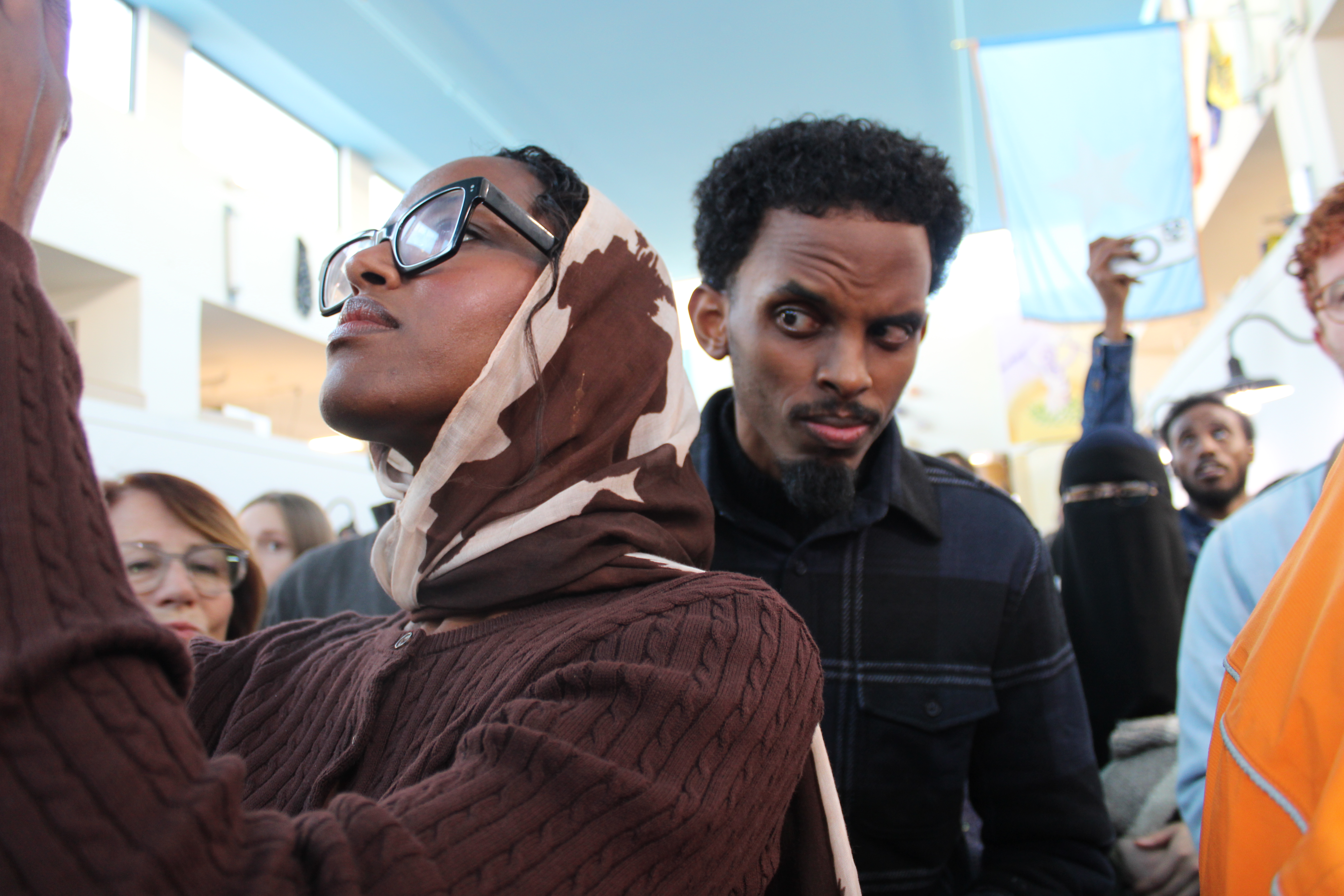
Mohamed takes a selfie with Omar Fateh at an event in November 2025.

=== Pre-campaign political activity ===
Mohamed interned for Ayada Leads, a nonprofit that seeks to support black immigrant women in political participation. While working as a community advocacy manager for the Council on American-Islamic Relations in Minnesota, she advocated for legislation relating to public safety reform, including advocacy against no-knock warrants. Mohamed volunteered full-time for Omar Fateh's 2020 campaign for Minnesota State Senate, in which Fateh upset incumbent Jeff Hayden. In January 2022, she began working as a policy aide to Jason Chavez, a Minneapolis City Council member.

=== Minnesota State Senate ===
Patricia Torres Ray, the incumbent senator for District 63, did not run for reelection in 2022. After conversations with Torres Ray and other organizers, Mohamed entered the race, and was endorsed by Torres Ray. The main themes of her campaign were a statewide $15 minimum wage, universal health care, and public safety reform.

After defeating Todd Scott in the primary election to become the DFL nominee, Mohamed won the general election against Republican nominee Shawn Holster.

Mohamed joined Erin Maye Quade and Clare Oumou Verbeten as the first black women elected to the Minnesota Senate. She is also the youngest woman ever elected to serve in the legislature.

== Personal life ==
Mohamed has lived in south Minneapolis for much of her life. Her brother-in-law is Minnesota State Senator Omar Fateh.
