= Susan Allen (politician) =

American politician (born 1963)

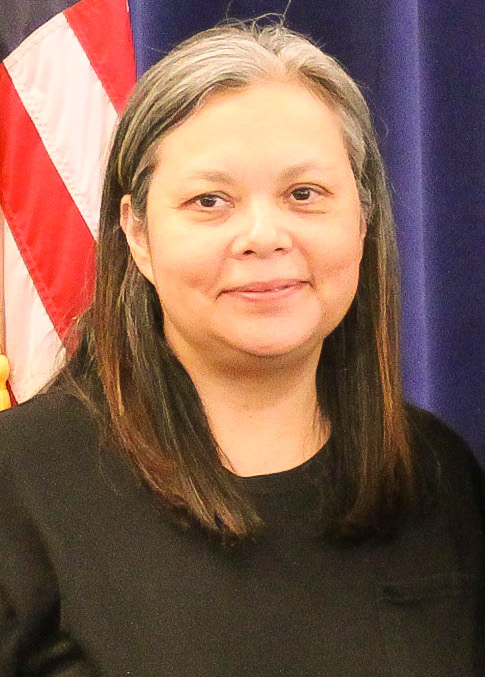
- Allen in 2014

Member of the Minnesota House of Representatives from the 62B district 61B (2012–2013)
- In office January 19, 2012 – January 7, 2019
- Preceded by: Jeff Hayden
- Succeeded by: Aisha Gomez

Personal details
- Born: March 27, 1963 (age 63) Uintah and Ouray Indian Reservation, Utah
- Party: Democratic–Farmer–Labor
- Domestic partner: Amber Gianera
- Children: 1
- Education: Augsburg College; University of New Mexico; William Mitchell College of Law
- Profession: Attorney

Susan Allen (born March 27, 1963) is an American politician and former member of the Minnesota House of Representatives. A member of the Minnesota Democratic–Farmer–Labor Party (DFL), she represented District 62B, a southside district encompassing the Powderhorn and Bryant neighborhoods of Minneapolis. She was the first Native American woman to serve in the Minnesota Legislature and the first openly lesbian Native American to win election to a state legislature. She did not seek re-election in 2018.

== Early life, education, and career ==
The daughter of an Episcopal priest, Allen graduated from Augsburg College in Minneapolis in 1992. She later earned a J.D. from the University of New Mexico Law School (1995) and an LL.M. from William Mitchell College of Law in St. Paul (1999). She became a practicing attorney in 1997 and a partner of her law firm in 2004.

== Minnesota House of Representatives ==
Allen was one of five openly gay members, alongside Representatives Allan Spear, Karen Clark and Erin Maye Quade and Senator Scott Dibble, in the Minnesota Legislature.

=== Elections ===
When state representative Jeff Hayden was elected to the Minnesota Senate in October 2011, he vacated his seat in the House of Representatives. Allen was one of four DFLers to put themselves forward for the seat and, at the DFL nominating convention held on November 12, she received the party's endorsement on the third ballot. She nevertheless faced a primary election on December 6, facing three opponents, two of whom had suspended their campaigns after losing at the convention. Allen won the nomination handily, taking over 82% of the vote in the primary. In the general election held on January 10, 2012, she faced only one opponent, who ran under the "Respect" label, beating him 56–43%.

She was re-elected in the 2012, 2014 and 2016 general elections. She did not seek re-election in 2018.

== Personal life ==
As an attorney, Allen specializes in serving Indian tribes, helping them draft tribal laws in a wide range of areas. She is Lakota and a member of the Rosebud Sioux Tribe. She identifies as two-spirit.

== See also ==
- List of Native American politicians
- Native American women in politics
