= 2016 Minnesota House of Representatives district 50B special election =

District 50B special election, 2016
- February 9, 2016

The District 50B seat in the Minnesota House of Representatives
Nominee	Chad Anderson	Andrew Carlson
Party	Republican	Democratic (DFL)
Popular vote	2,582	2,452
Percentage	51.24%	48.66%
- Precinct Results Anderson: 50-60% 60-70% Carlson: 50-60%
Representative before election
Ann Lenczewski
Democratic (DFL)
Elected
Representative
Chad Anderson
Republican

A special election was held in the U.S. state of Minnesota on February 9, 2016, to elect a new representative for District 50B in the Minnesota House of Representatives, caused by the resignation of Representative Ann Lenczewski, effective on December 15, 2015. As only one candidate each filed for the nomination of the Republican Party of Minnesota and Minnesota Democratic–Farmer–Labor Party (DFL), a primary election was not held. Chad Anderson, the Republican nominee, won the special election.

== Candidates ==
=== Republican Party of Minnesota ===
The Senate District 50 Republican Party held a convention to endorse a candidate on December 12, 2015. Chad Anderson won the endorsement over Sanu Patel-Zellinger after a single ballot.

- Chad Anderson, real estate broker

==== Withdrawn ====
- Sanu Patel-Zellinger

=== Minnesota Democratic–Farmer–Labor Party ===
The Senate District 50 Democratic–Farmer–Labor Party endorsed Andrew Carlson on December 14, 2015.

- Andrew Carlson, Bloomington two-term City Council member

== Results ==
Minnesota House of Representatives District 50B special election, 2016
Party	Candidate	Votes	%	∆pp
Republican Party of Minnesota	Chad Anderson	2,582	51.24	+17.00
Minnesota Democratic–Farmer–Labor Party	Andrew Carlson	2,452	48.66	−16.94
Write-in	N/A	5	0.10	−0.06
Total		5,039	100.00	±0.00

== Previous election results ==
Minnesota House of Representatives election, 2014: District 50B
Party	Candidate	Votes	%	∆pp
Minnesota Democratic–Farmer–Labor Party	Ann Lenczewski	10,060	65.60	+0.33
Republican Party of Minnesota	Zavier Bicott	5,251	34.24	−0.32
Write-in	N/A	24	0.16	−0.01
Total		15,335	100.00	±0.00

== See also ==
- List of special elections to the Minnesota House of Representatives
