= Char Samuelson =

American politician (born 1945)

Member of the Minnesota House of Representatives from the 50B district
- In office 2003–2007
- Preceded by: Geri Evans
- Succeeded by: Kate Knuth

Personal details
- Born: 1945 (age 80–81)
- Party: Republican

Char Samuelson (born 1945) is a former Republican member of the Minnesota House of Representatives, serving from 2003 to 2007. She was elected from Minnesota 50B, which during her tenure in office served New Brighton, Arden Hills, and Shoreview. She was succeeded by Kate Knuth upon her retirement.

Samuelson first was elected to public office in 1994, when she was elected to the New Brighton City Council. She served on the City Council until 2002, when she ran for the House and defeated Geri Evans. Samuelson served two terms in the House, defeating Evans again in the 2004 election, and served on several committees relating to health care. Samuelson worked in health care before seeking public office. She received her bachelor's degree from Metropolitan State University and her master's from United Theological Seminary.

In 2009, Samuelson came out of retirement to run for re-election to the New Brighton City Council. She was elected to a two-year term.

== Electoral history ==
- 2004 Race for Minnesota State House - District 50B
  - Char Samuelson (Republican) 10,843 (51.91%)
  - Geri Evans (Democratic-Farmer-Labor) 10,019 votes (47.96%)
- 2002 Race for Minnesota State House - District 50B
  - Char Samuelson (Republican) 10,027 (55.23%)
  - Geri Evans (Democratic-Farmer-Labor) 8,099 votes (44.61%)
