= Minnesota's 50B House of Representatives district =

American legislative district

Minnesota's 50B State House of Representatives district
Representative
Steve Elkins; DFL–Bloomington
since 2023
- Population (2020): 42,586

District 50B is a district in the Minnesota House of Representatives covering most of the western half of Bloomington, Minnesota. It has been represented by Steve Elkins since 2023.

== List of representatives ==
Member	Party	Residence	Term
Steve Elkins	DFL	Bloomington	2019-
Andrew Carlson	DFL	Bloomington	2017-2023
Chad Anderson	R	Bloomington	2016-2017
Vacant			2015-2016
Ann Lenczewski	DFL	Bloomington	2013-2015
Kate Knuth	DFL	Bloomington	2007-2013
Char Samuelson	R	Bloomington	2003-2007
Geri Evans	DFL	Bloomington	2001-2003
