= Hodan Hassan =

American politician (born 1982)

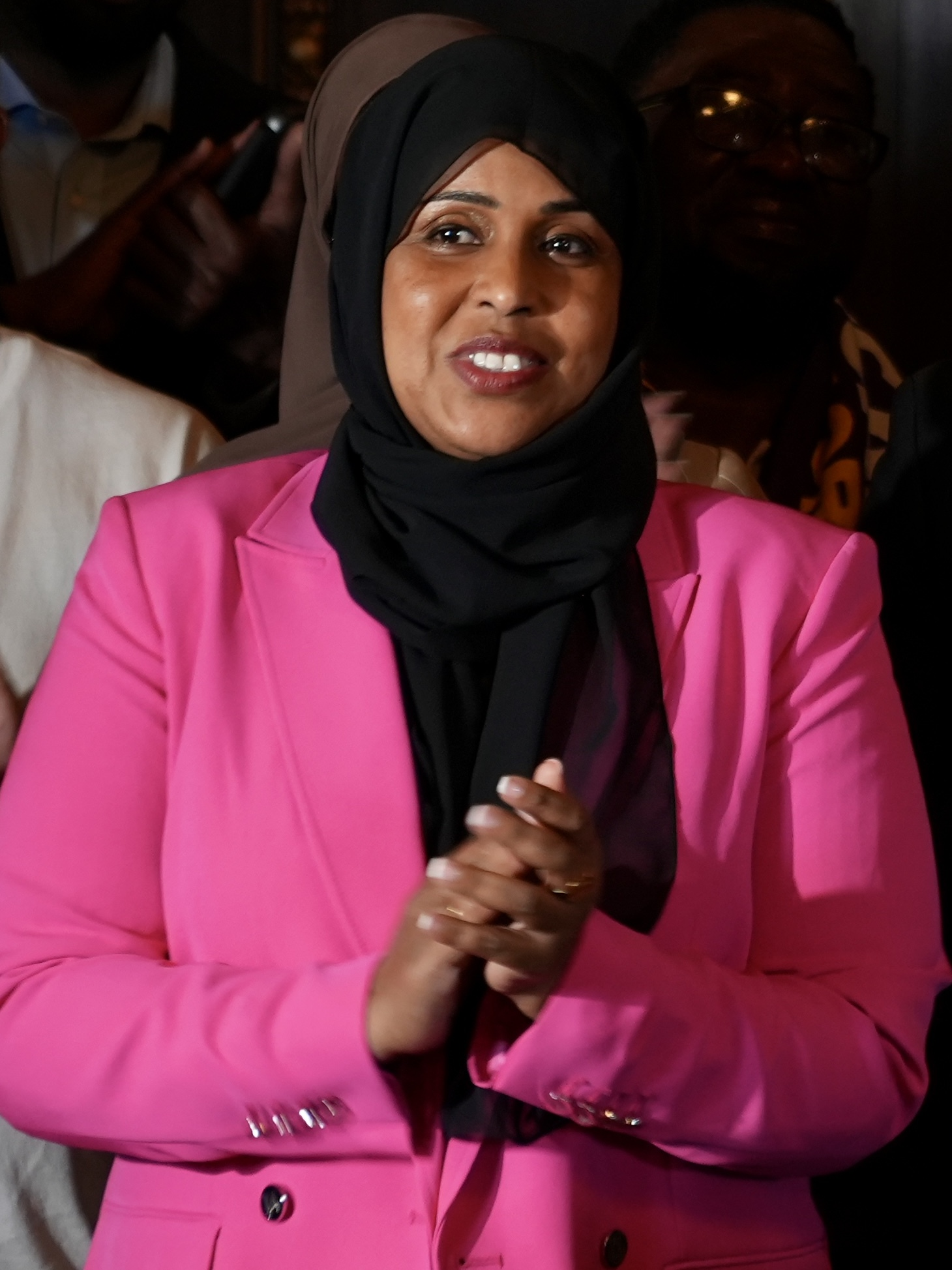

Member of the Minnesota House of Representatives from the 62B district
- In office January 8, 2019 – January 13, 2025
- Preceded by: Karen Clark
- Succeeded by: Anquam Mahamoud

Personal details
- Born: February 1, 1982 (age 44) Somalia
- Party: Democratic (DFL)
- Children: 2
- Education: Metropolitan State University (B.A.); Augsburg University (M.A.)
- Occupation: Legislator; Mental health clinician
- Website: Government website Campaign website

Hodan Hassan (born February 1, 1982) is an American politician who served in the Minnesota House of Representatives from 2019 to 2025. A member of the Minnesota Democratic–Farmer–Labor Party (DFL), Hassan represented District 62B, which includes parts of Minneapolis in Hennepin County, Minnesota.

== Early life, education, and career ==
Hassan was born in Somalia on February 1, 1982. In 1991, the Somali Civil War led Hassan to seek refuge in the Dadaab refugee camp in Kenya. Hassan immigrated to the United States in 1999. She graduated from Metropolitan State University with a B.A. in social work and from Augsburg University with an M.A. in social work.

Hassan is a mental health clinician and the executive director for Pathways 2 Prosperity. She has worked as a senior clinical social worker for Hennepin County.

After two of her nieces were badly hurt in an Al-Shabaab terrorist shooting, Hassan became active in fighting extremism in Minnesota and rebuilding trust between Somali Minnesotans and the government. In 2015, she visited the White House as part of a Summit on Countering Violent Extremism. A youth mentor, Hassan said that fewer job and community opportunities make youth more susceptible to aggressive recruiting. She argued for a less punitive approach to a proposed female genital mutilation bill. She chaired the Somali-American Task Force, which offered feedback to U.S. Attorney Andrew Luger on how to prevent recruitment from terrorist groups.

== Minnesota House of Representatives ==
Hassan was elected to the Minnesota House of Representatives in 2018 and reelected in 2020 and 2022. She first ran after 19-term incumbent Karen Clark announced she would not seek reelection. Hassan won the crowded DFL primary election, defeating future state senator Omar Fateh. She was the second Somali-American woman elected to the state legislature, after Ilhan Omar in 2016.

Hassan chaired the Economic Development Finance and Policy Committee and sat on the Housing Finance and Policy, Ways and Means, and Workforce Development Finance and Policy Committees. From 2020 to 2021, she was vice chair of the Education Policy Committee. From 2019 to 2020 she served as an assistant majority leader of the House DFL Caucus. Hassan was a member of the House People of Color and Indigenous (POCI) Caucus, the United Black Legislative Caucus, and the Black Maternal Health Caucus.

In February 2024, Hassan announced she would not seek reelection after serving three terms in the Minnesota House, saying she was looking forward to spending more time with her young children.

=== Public safety and policing ===
Hassan was a member of a working group on police use of deadly force led by Minnesota Public Safety Commissioner John Harrington and Minnesota Attorney General Keith Ellison. She has been outspoken on police reform. In 2019, she signed a letter to a judge asking for leniency in sentencing Minneapolis police officer Mohamed Noor for the murder of Justine Damond.

Hassan advocated for police reform in the aftermath of the murder of George Floyd, and criticized Republicans for "demonizing" Minneapolis. She criticized Minneapolis police for their handling of a traffic stop that resulted in the killing of Dolal Idd.

=== Education ===
Hassan was the lead author of legislation to change the state constitution to add education as a "fundamental right", which she said could help address racial disparities in education. She introduced the Increase Teachers of Color Act, which would increase bonuses for hiring out-of-state teachers of color. In 2021, 34% of Minnesota students were nonwhite, compared to only 5% of teachers. She also introduced a bill that would add a personal finance course to Minnesota high school graduation requirements to increase student's financial literacy.

=== Other political positions ===
Hassan worked on legislation to give women of color grants and assistance in starting businesses, and a bill to increase advocacy and education on the dangers of using products to lighten skin. She authored legislation that would expunge from tenants' records cases that do not end in eviction and eviction records more than three years old, arguing that tenants deserve a second chance. Hassan co-wrote an op-ed calling for a more racially equitable transit system, and investment in transit lines that run through historically marginalized communities. She criticized ride-share companies Lyft and Uber for how they handle driver compensation, insurance and working conditions.

Hassan has been critical of Minneapolis Mayor Jacob Frey, and during the 2021 Minneapolis mayoral election, did not endorse Frey, signing on to a letter that advocated for a "new mayor" who would do more to end racial disparities and increase public safety. In 2019, Hassan signed a letter of support for Representative Ilhan Omar after she was accused of making antisemitic comments. Before a visit by President Donald Trump, Hassan said, "Trump, his hate, and his bigotry is not welcome in Minnesota."

== Electoral history ==
2018 DFL Primary for Minnesota State House - District 62A
Party	Candidate	Votes	%
Democratic (DFL)	Hodan Hassan	2,207	28.41
Democratic (DFL)	Osman Ahmed	1,607	20.68
Democratic (DFL)	Omar Fateh	1,602	20.62
Democratic (DFL)	Margarita Ortega	1,531	19.71
Democratic (DFL)	Jen Kader	822	10.58
Total votes		7,769	100.0

2018 Minnesota State House - District 62A
Party	Candidate	Votes	%
Democratic (DFL)	Hodan Hassan	13,107	90.39
Republican	Bruce Lundeen	1,281	8.83
Write-in		113	0.78
Total votes		14,501	100.0
Democratic (DFL) hold			

2020 Minnesota State House - District 62A
Party	Candidate	Votes	%
Democratic (DFL)	Hodan Hassan (incumbent)	14,332	89.61
Republican	Arjun Kataria	1,618	10.12
Write-in		44	0.28
Total votes		15,994	100.0
Democratic (DFL) hold			

2022 Minnesota State House - District 62B
Party	Candidate	Votes	%
Democratic (DFL)	Hodan Hassan (incumbent)	13,138	89.61
Republican	Taylor Hammond	1,383	9.50
Write-in		32	0.22
Total votes		14,553	100.0
Democratic (DFL) hold			

== Personal life ==
Hassan has two children and resides in Minneapolis's Ventura Village neighborhood.
