= Emma Greenman =

American politician

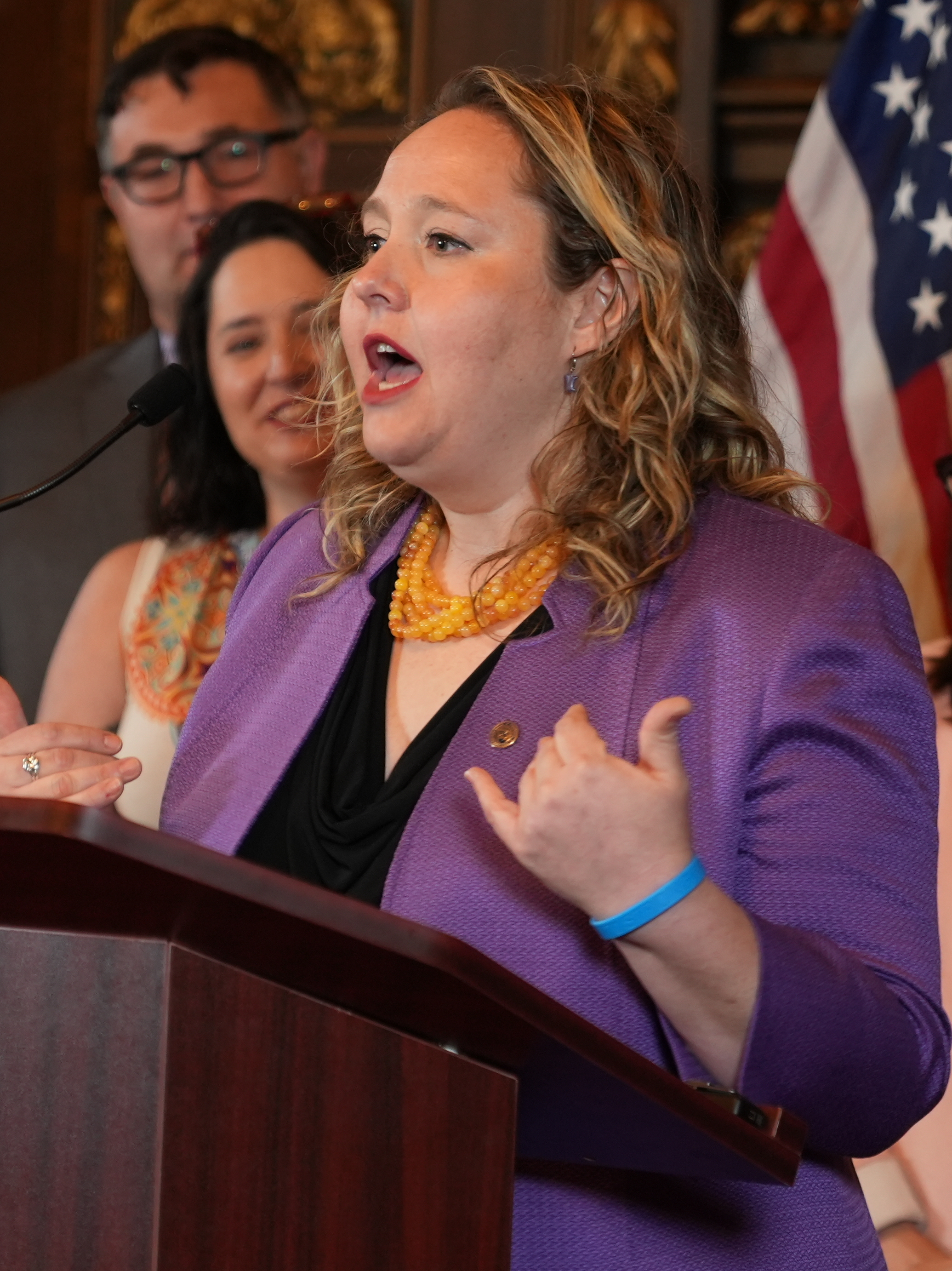

Member of the Minnesota House of Representatives from the 63B district
- Incumbent
- Assumed office January 5, 2021
- Preceded by: Jean Wagenius

Personal details
- Born: April 24, 1979 (age 47)
- Party: Democratic (DFL)
- Education: George Washington University (BA); Harvard University (MPA); University of California, Berkeley (JD)
- Website: State House website Campaign website

Emma Greenman (born April 24, 1979) is an American politician who has served since 2021 in the Minnesota House of Representatives. A member of the Democratic-Farmer-Labor Party (DFL), Greenman represents District 63B, which includes parts of south Minneapolis in Hennepin County, Minnesota.

== Early life, education and career ==
Greenman attended high school at Minneapolis South High School. She earned a Bachelor of Arts degree in political science from George Washington University, a Master of Public Administration from Harvard University and a Juris Doctor from the UC Berkeley School of Law.

In 2007, Greenman worked as a legal intern at the Brennan Center for Justice. In 2008, she was a summer associate at King & Spalding. She was then a legal intern in the United States Department of Justice Civil Rights Division. In 2010, she was the deputy campaign manager of Margaret Anderson Kelliher's campaign for governor of Minnesota. She then worked as an attorney in the Public Defender's Office in Ramsey County, Minnesota, and as a state director for the Service Employees International Union.

From 2013 to 2015, Greenman was a political trainer for Wellstone Action, a progressive advocacy organization. She also worked as an attorney for Maslon LLP from 2012 to 2015. In 2015, she represented Tony Webster, an independent journalist who sued the city of Bloomington for failing to release records related to a Black Lives Matter protest. From 2015 to 2021, she was the director of voting rights and democracy at the Center for Popular Democracy. In 2018, she was a member of Attorney General Keith Ellison's transition team.

In 2016, Governor Mark Dayton appointed Greenman to the Minnesota Campaign Finance Board. She served briefly in an interim capacity, but her appointment was not confirmed by the Republican-controlled Minnesota Senate. While a member, she was the only vote against allowing the then-city council member Jacob Frey to transfer his campaign funds from his council races to his mayoral campaign. In the 2021 Minneapolis mayoral election, Greenman did not endorse Frey, and signed on to a letter that advocated for a "new mayor" who would do more to end racial disparities and increase public safety.

== Minnesota House of Representatives ==
Greenman was elected to the Minnesota House of Representatives in 2020 and reelected in 2022. She first ran after 17-term incumbent Jean Wagenius announced she would not seek reelection.

Greenman is vice chair of the Elections Finance and Policy Committee, and sits on the Education Finance, Labor and Industry Finance and Policy, and Veterans and Military Affairs Finance and Policy Committees. From 2021 to 2022, she was as an assistant majority leader of the House DFL caucus.

In May 2026, Greenman authored a bill to ban prediction markets, such as Kalshi and Polymarket. She said that such a ban would protect children. After the ban passed, the CFTC under the second Donald Trump administration immediately sued to stop Minnesota from implementing it.

=== Election policy ===
Greenman co-chairs an Inclusive Democracy caucus announced on the second anniversary of the January 6 insurrection. She is the author of the "Democracy for the People" Act, the House DFL's major elections bill of the 2023 legislative session. She has been outspoken about the threat that the Republican Party poses to democracy after the January 6 insurrection. She has opposed efforts to institute voter ID requirements in Minnesota, and advocated for automatic voter registration, pre-registration for 16- and 17-year-olds, and restoring the vote to felons after they leave incarceration. She has sponsored legislation to increase protections for poll workers and to tighten reporting requirements for independent political expenditures. She has also proposed a "Democracy Dollars" program that would send voters two $25 coupons that could be used to donate to political candidates.

At the 2024 Humphrey-Mondale Awards, Greeman received the Joan Growe Award for Distinguished Commitment to Expanding Access to Democracy and Justice in Minnesota.

=== Labor and worker's rights ===
Greenman has been outspoken about the poor working conditions at Amazon package facilities, writing, "When Amazon arrived in Minnesota six years ago, it promised to provide our state with safe, reliable jobs with dignified wages. Instead, it delivered our communities quite the opposite." She wrote a bill to increase worker protections at warehouse facilities. She also wrote a bill to restrict who can be classified as an "independent contractor" to protect Uber and Lyft workers from exploitation.

== Electoral history ==
2020 DFL Primary for Minnesota State House - District 63B
Party	Candidate	Votes	%
Democratic (DFL)	Emma Greenman	7,380	63.98
Democratic (DFL)	Jerome T Evans	3,032	26.29
Democratic (DFL)	Husniyah Dent Bradley	1,123	9.74
Total votes		11,535	100.0

2020 Minnesota State House - District 63B
Party	Candidate	Votes	%
Democratic (DFL)	Emma Greenman	18,980	72.95
Republican	Frank Pafko	4,960	19.06
Legal Marijuana Now	Dennis Schuller	2,039	7.84
Write-in		40	0.15
Total votes		26,019	100.0
Democratic (DFL) hold			

2022 Minnesota State House - District 63B
Party	Candidate	Votes	%
Democratic (DFL)	Emma Greenman (incumbent)	20,339	98.67
Write-in		274	1.33
Total votes		20,613	100.0
Democratic (DFL) hold			

2024 Minnesota State House - District 63B
Party	Candidate	Votes	%
Democratic (DFL)	Emma Greenman (incumbent)	22,790	85.27
Republican	Diane Napper	3,878	14.51
Write-in		58	0.22
Total votes		26,726	100.0
Democratic (DFL) hold			

== Personal life ==
Greenman lives in Minneapolis. She is Jewish.
