= Kate Knuth =

American politician

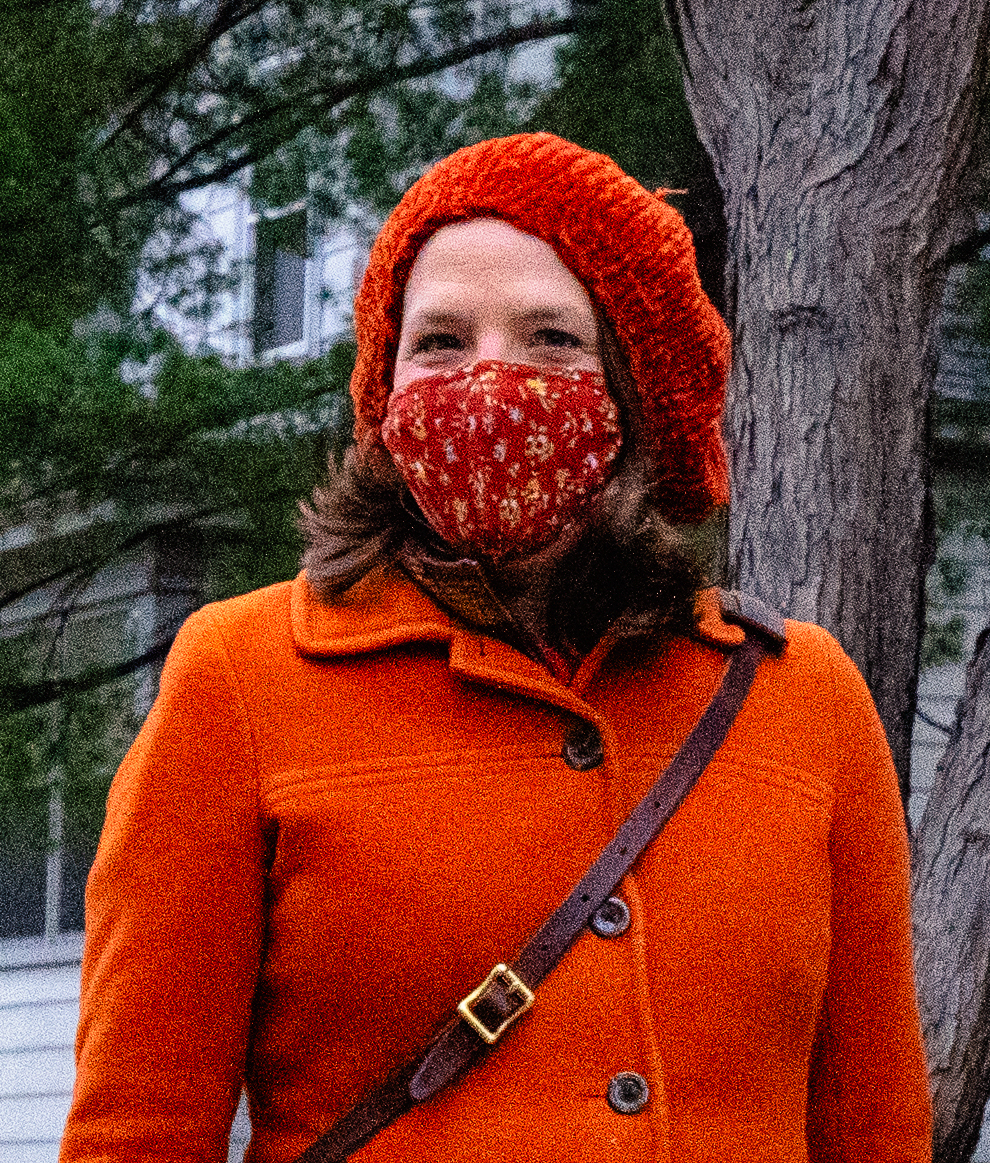
- Knuth doorknocking in 2021

Member of the Minnesota House of Representatives from the 50B district
- In office January 3, 2007 – January 7, 2013
- Preceded by: Char Samuelson
- Succeeded by: Ann Lenczewski

Personal details
- Born: Katherine Ann Knuth; May 15, 1981 (age 45) Minneapolis, Minnesota, U.S.
- Party: DFL
- Relatives: Daniel Knuth (father); Gordon Backlund (uncle)
- Education: University of Chicago (BA); University of Oxford (MS); University of Minnesota (PhD)
- Website: Campaign website

Katherine Ann Knuth (born May 15, 1981) is an American politician who served as a member of the Minnesota House of Representatives for District 50B from 2007 to 2013. She was a Minnesota Democratic–Farmer–Labor Party candidate for mayor of Minneapolis in the city's 2021 election.

== Early life and education ==
Katherine "Kate" Knuth was born on May 15, 1981, to parents Daniel Knuth and Joann Knuth.

As an undergraduate at the University of Chicago, Knuth studied biology and philosophy. She worked at the Field Museum of Natural History and served as National President of the coed Venturing program of the Boy Scouts of America. After graduating with her B.A, Knuth spent a year in Norway as a Fulbright student, studying how the country's strong environmental ethic affected the development of oil into one of its major industries. She then moved to England to continue her education, completing a M.Sc at the University of Oxford in biodiversity conservation. She spent three weeks in Washington D.C. trying to secure interviews with members of Congress for a study of environmental voting records and leadership.

In late August 2005, while Knuth was finishing her master's thesis, Hurricane Katrina hit New Orleans and the Gulf Coast. Knuth was concerned about how an extreme weather event intersected with racial and economic injustice in ways that made many people suffer. She had been concerned about climate change, and decided to run for public office.

== Career ==
=== Minnesota legislature ===
On November 7, 2006, Knuth won the seat in the Minnesota House of Representatives vacated by the retiring Char Samuelson. She was one of the youngest representatives to serve in the 85th Legislature. At the Minnesota State Capitol, Knuth focused mainly on climate change and toxic chemical policy reform, issues in the Minnesota Department of Commerce, and the state budget. While in the legislature, Knuth enrolled in a Ph.D. program in conservation sciences at the University of Minnesota.

After redistricting in 2012, Knuth was drawn into the same legislative district as her Democratic–Farmer–Labor colleague Representative Tom Tillberry. She did not seek reelection in 2012.

=== Post-legislative career ===
After her stint in the legislature, Knuth returned to work as the Director for the Boreas Leadership Program at the University of Minnesota Institute on the Environment.

On June 19, 2017, the City of Minneapolis hired Knuth as chief resilience officer, a new position that coordinated the city's work on urban challenges from housing affordability to climate change. In February 2018, one month after Mayor Jacob Frey was sworn in and seven months into her new role, Knuth resigned, saying that she and Frey did not have the same vision for Minneapolis. She had been conducting interviews and surveys and passed her research off to her successor.

=== 2021 Minneapolis mayoral campaign ===
On March 2, 2021, Knuth announced her campaign for mayor of Minneapolis in the city's 2021 election as a member of the Minnesota Democratic–Farmer–Labor Party. She said she decided to run because of what she called Frey's lack of leadership and the absence of other candidates who could assemble a broad coalition to help move the city forward. Knuth advanced to the final round of ranked voting, earning 43.8% of the vote as Frey was reelected.

== Electoral history ==
2006 Minnesota House Election District 50B
Party	Candidate	Votes	%
Democratic (DFL)	Kate Knuth	9,025	53.67%
Republican	Lori Grivna	7,769	46.20%

2008 Minnesota House Election District 50B
Party	Candidate	Votes	%
Democratic (DFL)	Kate Knuth	11,966	56.51%
Republican	Lori Grivna	9,183	43.37%

2010 Minnesota House Election District 50B
Party	Candidate	Votes	%
Democratic (DFL)	Kate Knuth	8,455	52.4%
Republican	Russ Bertsch	7,667	47.51%

2021 Minneapolis Mayoral Election
Party	Candidate	Votes	%
Democratic (DFL)	Jacob Frey	70,669	49.1%
Democratic (DFL)	Kate Knuth	55,007	38.2%
Democratic (DFL)	Sheila Nezhad (Eliminated round 2)	30,368	0%

== Personal life ==
Knuth and her husband, Sam, have one daughter. They reside in Minneapolis's Bryn Mawr neighborhood.

Knuth's father, Daniel Knuth, served in the Minnesota House of Representatives from 1983 to 1989. Her uncle Gordon Backlund served in the Minnesota House of Representatives in 1985 and 1986.
