= Gordon Backlund =

American politician and electrical engineer

Gordon Backclund

Member of the Minnesota House of Representatives
- In office 1985–1986

Personal details
- Born: November 11, 1940 (age 85) Saint Paul, Minnesota, U.S.
- Party: Republican
- Relations: Kate Knuth (niece)
- Education: University of Minnesota (BS); University of Iowa (MPA)

Gordon Backlund (born November 11, 1940) is an American politician and former engineer who served as a member of the Minnesota House of Representatives from 1985 to 1986.

== Early life and education ==
Backlund was born in Saint Paul, Minnesota. He graduated from Two Harbors High School in Two Harbors, Minnesota. Backlund received a Bachelor of Science degree in electrical engineering from the University of Minnesota and his Master of Public Administration from the University of Iowa.

== Career ==
Backlund worked for Collins Radio Company in Cedar Rapids, Iowa. He served in the Minnesota House of Representatives in 1985 and 1986 and was a Republican. In 1989, Backlund served on the Fridley School Board.

== Personal life ==
Backlund lived in Fridley, Minnesota. Backlund and his wife, Linda, had two children. His son, Mark, died in January 2008, at age 29, after a traffic accident. Mark was tasered by Minnesota State Patrol troopers after being "uncooperative and combative." State troopers were cleared of any wrongdoing in the incident.

His brother-in-law, Daniel Knuth, and his niece, Kate Knuth, also served in the Minnesota Legislature.
