= Chad Anderson (politician) =

American politician

Member of the Minnesota House of Representatives from the 50B district
- In office February 17, 2016 – January 2, 2017
- Preceded by: Ann Lenczewski
- Succeeded by: Andrew Carlson

Personal details
- Born: April 19, 1979 (age 47)
- Party: Republican Party of Minnesota
- Spouse: Anne
- Children: 4
- Education: Bethel University
- Occupation: real estate broker property manager

Chad Anderson (born April 19, 1979) is an American politician and former member of the Minnesota House of Representatives. A member of the Republican Party of Minnesota, he represented District 50B in the south-central Twin Cities metropolitan area.

== Early life, education, and career ==
Anderson attended Bethel University, graduating with a B.A. He is a real estate broker.

== Minnesota House of Representatives ==
Anderson was elected to the Minnesota House of Representatives in a special election on February 9, 2016 and assumed office on February 17, 2016. He lost re-election to Minnesota Democratic–Farmer–Labor Party (DFL) candidate Andrew Carlson.

== Personal life ==
Anderson and his wife, Anne, have four children. They reside in Bloomington, Minnesota.

His father-in-law is state Senator Dan Hall.
