= Linda Berglin =

American politician (born 1944)

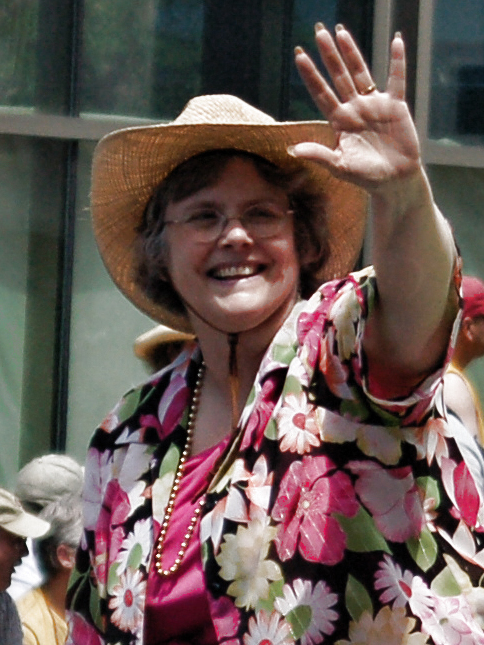

Member of the Minnesota Senate from the 61st district
- In office January 6, 1981 – August 15, 2011
- Preceded by: Steve Keefe
- Succeeded by: Jeff Hayden

Member of the Minnesota House of Representatives from the 59A district
- In office January 2, 1973 – January 5, 1981
- Succeeded by: Karen Clark

Personal details
- Born: October 19, 1944 (age 81) Oakland, California
- Party: Minnesota Democratic-Farmer-Labor Party
- Spouse: Glenn Sampson
- Children: 1
- Education: Minneapolis College of Art and Design
- Occupation: Legislator, graphic designer

Linda Lee Berglin (born October 19, 1944) is a Minnesota politician and a former member of the Minnesota Senate who represented District 61, which includes portions of the city of Minneapolis in Hennepin County, which is in the Twin Cities metropolitan area. A Democrat, she was first elected to the Senate in 1980, and was re-elected in each election until she resigned on August 15, 2011, to take a position with Hennepin County. Prior to the 1982 and 1992 redistricting, the area was known as District 59 and District 60, respectively.

== Leadership in the Minnesota House and Senate ==
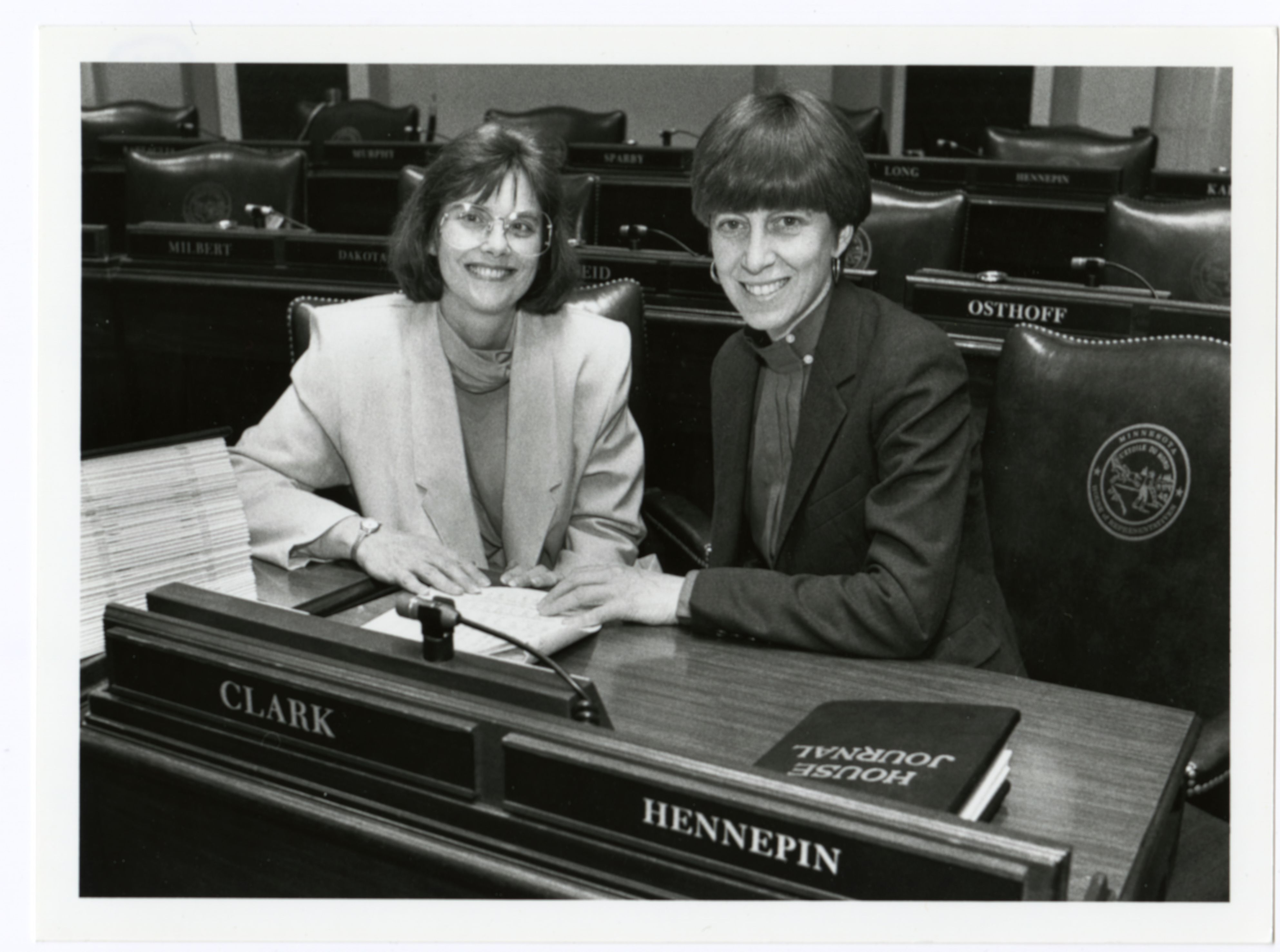
Senator Linda Berglin poses with Representative Karen Clark in the House Chamber, St. Paul, Minnesota.

Prior to being elected to the Senate, Berglin was a member of the Minnesota House of Representatives, being first elected in 1972 in the old House District 59A. She was re-elected in 1974, 1976 and 1978. She was an assistant majority leader from 1977 to 1980, and was also Assistant DFL Caucus Leader in 1979. From 1977 to 1980 she also chaired the Minnesota Commission on the Economic Status of Women, which she served on from 1977 to 2002.

Berglin was most recently a member of the Senate's Capital Investment, Finance, Health and Human Services, and Rules and Administration committees. She also served on the Rules and Administration Subcommittee for Committees. She was chair of the previously named Health and Human Services and Health Care committees from 1983 to 1996, and of the Human Resources Finance Committee from 1997 to 2000. Her special legislative concerns include health and welfare, corrections, taxes, urban affairs, women's issues, minorities, senior citizens, and small business concerns.

Berglin was a candidate for United States Senate in 1994, but she withdrew before the DFL endorsing convention.

On July 25, 2011, Berglin announced that she was resigning from the Senate, effective August 15, 2011, to begin a new job with Hennepin County as a health policy program manager. A special election was scheduled for October 18, 2011, to fill the vacancy.

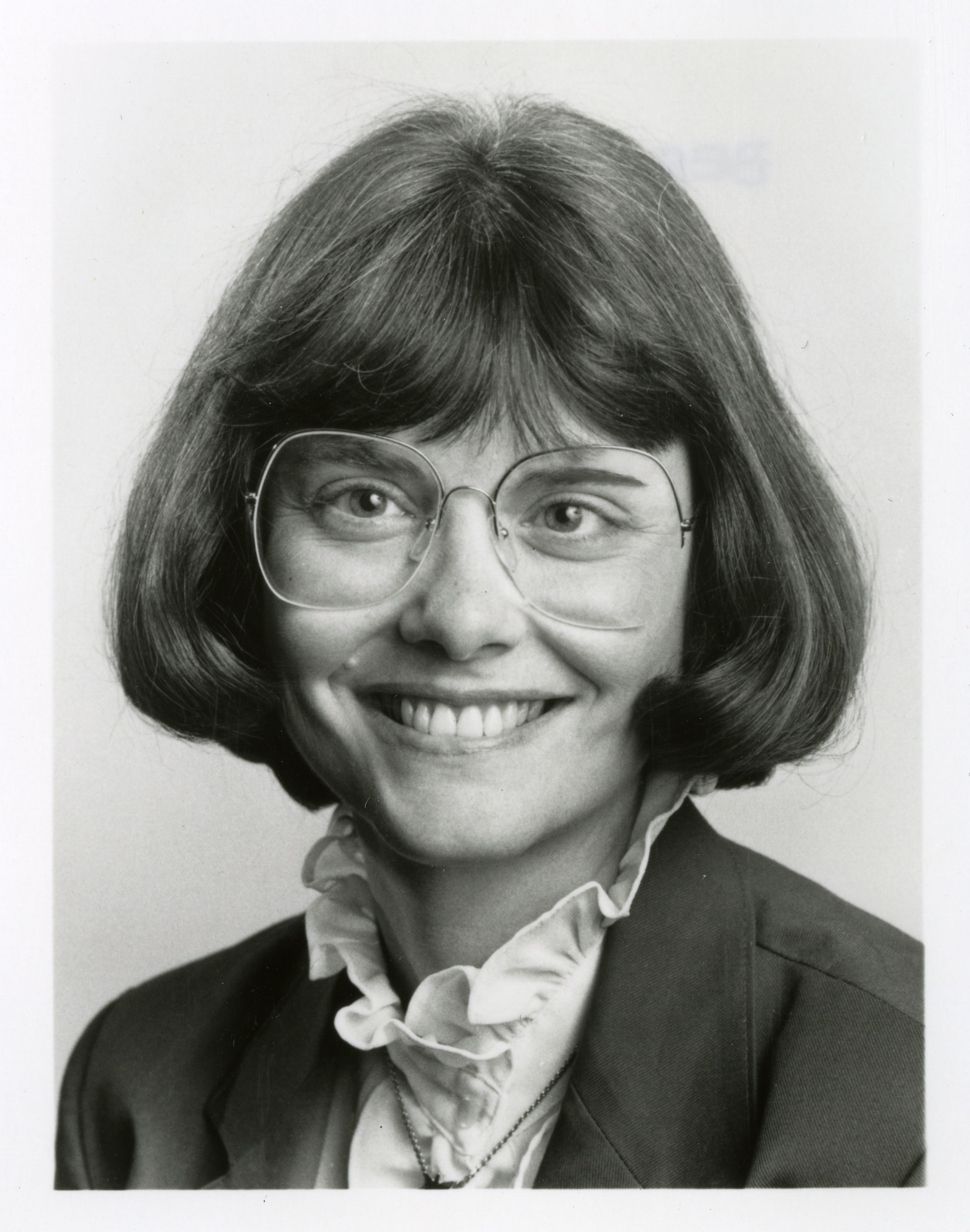
Senator Linda Lee Berglin, Minnesota Legislature, 1985-1986 Legislative Session.

== Education and community service ==
Berglin attended Roosevelt High School in Minneapolis, graduating in 1963, then went on to the Minneapolis College of Art and Design, where she earned her B.F.A. in graphic design in 1967. She worked as a designer for Brookson Broenen Design and for the City of Minneapolis Planning Department during the 1970s.

Berglin has been active in community service through the years. She chaired the Minneapolis Model Cities Board from 1968 to 1972. She also served on the PACER Advisory Board from 1996 to 2002. PACER is a Minnesota nonprofit, tax-exempt organization that provides information, training, and assistance to parents of children and young adults with all disabilities; physical, learning, cognitive, emotional, and health. She is a member of the Minnesota Health Care Consumer Advisory Board, and of the Powderhorn Community Council in Minneapolis' Powderhorn Neighborhood.
