= Daniel Knuth =

American politician (1945–2020)

Daniel J. Knuth (July 3, 1945 – October 5, 2020) was an American politician, educator, and environmental consultant.

== Early life and education ==
Knuth was born in Mabel, Minnesota and graduated from Mabel High School. He received his bachelor's degree in physical geography from Minnesota State University, Mankato and his master's and doctorate degrees in physical geography from Indiana University Bloomington.

== Career ==
He worked as a hydrologist, as an environmental consultant and taught at Macalester College. Knuth served in the Minnesota House of Representatives from 1985 to 1988 and was a Democrat. Knuth lived in New Brighton, Minnesota with his wife and family. His daughter Kate Knuth and his brother-in-law Gordon Backlund also served in the Minnesota Legislature.

== Death ==
Knuth died from Alzheimer's disease in New Brighton, Minnesota.
