= Myron Orfield =

American politician

Myron Willard Orfield, Jr.
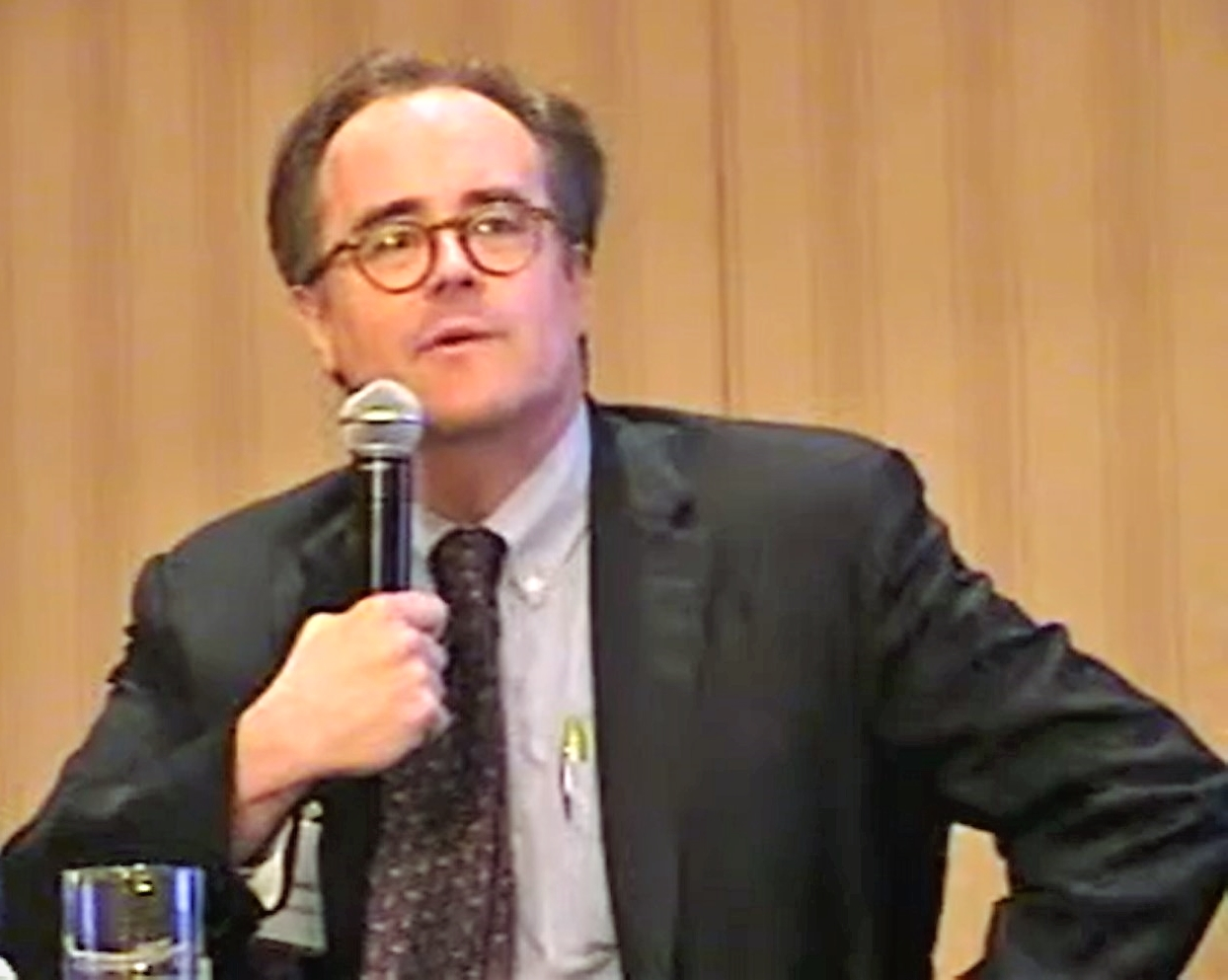
- Orfield speaks at the Sensible Land-Use Coalition in Minneapolis in 2014
- Born: July 27, 1961 (age 65); Minneapolis, Minnesota, U.S.
- Occupation: Law Professor

Academic background
- Education: University of Minnesota, Princeton University, University of Chicago Law School

Academic work
Notable works
"Metropolitics: A Regional Agenda for Community and Stability", "American Metropolitics: The New Suburban Reality", "Region: Planning the Future of the Twin Cities"
Myron Orfield
Member of the Minnesota Senate from the 60th district
- In office January 1, 2001 – January 5, 2003
- Preceded by: Allan Spear
- Succeeded by: Scott Dibble
Member of the Minnesota House of Representatives from the 60B district 59B (1991-1993)
- In office January 7, 1991 – December 31, 2000
- Preceded by: Todd Otis
- Succeeded by: Scott Dibble
Personal details
- Party: Democratic (DFL)

Myron Willard Orfield, Jr. (born July 27, 1961) is an American law professor at the University of Minnesota Law School, director of its Institute on Metropolitan Opportunity, and a former non-resident senior fellow at the Brookings Institution. He has been called "the most influential social demographer in America's burgeoning regional movement." Orfield teaches and writes in the fields of civil rights, state and local government, state and local finance, land use, questions of regional governance, and the legislative process. He is known for developing a classification scheme for U.S. suburbs (based on stage of development, social stress and fiscal capacity), documenting suburban racial change and resegregation, and for developing innovative regional land use, public finance, and governmental reforms. He is a former member of the Minnesota Legislature, having served in both the state house (1991-2000) and senate (2001-2003) and is the younger brother of Gary Orfield, a political scientist at UCLA.

== Education ==
Orfield was born in Minneapolis, Minnesota. He graduated summa cum laude from the University of Minnesota, was a graduate student at Princeton University, and has a J.D. from the University of Chicago, where he was a member of the University of Chicago Law Review. Following law school, he clerked for the United States Court of Appeals for the 8th Circuit and then returned to the University of Chicago Law School as a Research Associate and Bradley Fellow at the Center for Studies in Criminal Justice.

== Political career ==
In 1990, Orfield was elected as a Democrat to the Minnesota House of Representatives, where he served five terms, and to the Minnesota Senate in 2000, where he served one term. There he was the architect of a series of important changes in land use, fair housing, and school and local government aid programs. Orfield was the co-author (with Tim Pawlenty) of the Metropolitan Reorganization Act of 1994, which transformed the Twin Cities Metropolitan Council into the nation's most powerful regional government. His first book, Metropolitics: A Regional Agenda for Community and Stability, a study of local government structure and demographics, relates to these efforts.

== Scholarship ==
For over a decade, Orfield has been president of Ameregis, a national regional research firm undertaking studies involving the legal, demographic and land use profiles of various American metropolitan areas. His second book, American Metropolitics: The New Suburban Reality, is a compilation of his work involving the nation's 25 largest regions. His most recent book, Region: Planning the Future of the Twin Cities (U of M Press, 2010), co-authored with Thomas Luce, director of research at the Institute on Race and Poverty, examines the successes and failures of the Twin Cities Metropolitan Council's regional planning and policy work and includes recommendations for responsible, environmentally sound urban and suburban planning.
