= Andrew Carlson (politician) =

American politician

Member of the Minnesota House of Representatives from the 50B district
- In office January 3, 2017 – January 3, 2023
- Preceded by: Chad Anderson
- Succeeded by: Steve Elkins

Personal details
- Born: 1974 or 1975 (age 50–51)
- Party: Minnesota Democratic–Farmer–Labor Party
- Spouse: Kari
- Children: 2
- Education: Iowa State University; University of St. Thomas; University of Minnesota
- Occupation: lobbyist

Robert Andrew Carlson (born 1974/75) is an American politician and former member of the Minnesota House of Representatives. A member of the Minnesota Democratic–Farmer–Labor Party (DFL), he represented District 50B in the southern Twin Cities metropolitan area.

== Early life and career ==
Carlson attended Iowa State University, graduating with a Bachelor of Science in community and regional planning, and the University of St. Thomas, graduating with a Master of Business Administration. He was a policy fellow at the University of Minnesota Humphrey School of Public Affairs.

Carlson worked for many years as a project manager for the Minneapolis Public Works Department. He also served on the Bloomington Housing and Redevelopment Authority and the Bloomington City Council from 2014 to 2016.

== Minnesota House of Representatives ==
Carlson was first elected to the Minnesota House of Representatives in 2016, defeating Republican incumbent Chad Anderson.

Following the 2020 census, redistricting placed Carlson and fellow DFL Rep. Steve Elkins in the same district. Elkins defeated Carlson 61.1%-38.9% in the 2022 primary election, ending Carlson's political career.

After his defeat, Carlson took up work as a lobbyist.

== Personal life ==
Carlson and his wife, Kari, have two daughters. He has lived in Bloomington, Minnesota since 2006.
