= Steve Elkins (politician) =

American politician

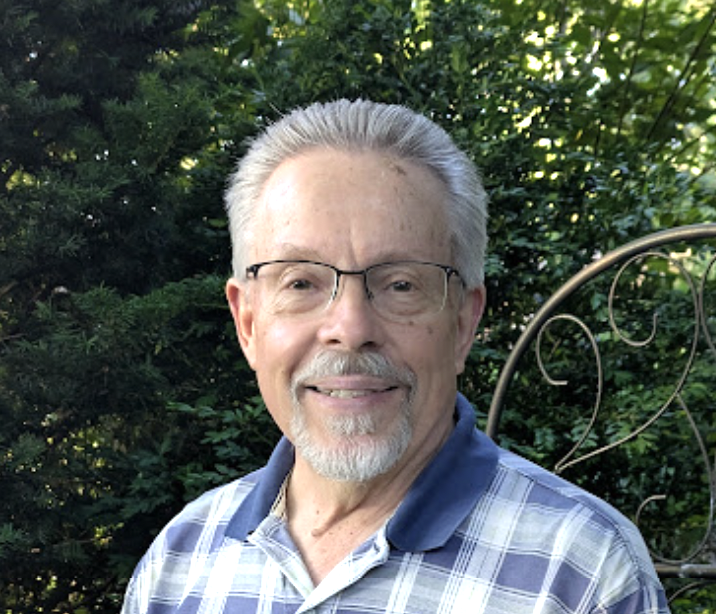
- Elkins in 2026

Member of the Minnesota House of Representatives from the 50B district
- Incumbent
- Assumed office January 8, 2019
- Preceded by: Andrew Carlson

Personal details
- Born: April 17, 1952 (age 74)
- Party: Democratic (DFL)
- Spouse: Judy
- Children: 2
- Education: University of California, Berkeley (BA)
- Occupation: IT Architect; Legislator
- Website: Government website Campaign website

Steve Elkins (born April 17, 1952) is an American politician serving in the Minnesota House of Representatives since 2019. A member of the Minnesota Democratic–Farmer–Labor Party (DFL), Elkins represents District 50B in the southwestern Twin Cities metropolitan area, which includes the city of Bloomington and parts of Hennepin County.

== Early life, education, and career ==
Elkins attended University of California, Berkeley, graduating with a Bachelor of Arts in economics.

Elkins was a member of the Bloomington city council for three terms until Governor Mark Dayton appointed him to the Metropolitan Council in 2011. He was chair of the Metropolitan Council Transportation Advisory Board, and served on the Bloomington School District Transportation Task Force and the Bloomington City Planning Commission. Elkins is an IT architect.

== Minnesota House of Representatives ==
Elkins was first elected to the Minnesota House of Representatives in 2018 and has been reelected every two years since. He first ran after four-term DFL incumbent Paul Rosenthal resigned to take a position in another state. After 2022 legislative redistricting put him in the same district as fellow state representative Andrew Carlson, Elkins defeated Carlson in the DFL primary election.

Elkins serves as vice chair of the Veterans and Military Affairs Finance and Policy Committee, and sits on the Health Finance and Policy, Taxes, and Transportation Finance and Policy Committees as well as the Property Tax Division of the Taxes Committee. From 2021 to 2022, he was vice chair of the Local Government Division of the State Government Finance and Elections Committee, and from 2019 to 2020 he was vice chair of the Subcommittee on Local Government.

=== Transportation ===
Elkins supported bipartisan legislation to allow undocumented immigrants to register vehicles with a consular ID. He authored legislation to reduce penalties for fare evasion on public transit and create "uniformed transit safety officials" to ride light-rail trains instead of police officers. He has said that suburban police departments are willing to help monitor Metro Transit sites. Elkins supported efforts to audit the Metropolitan Council's management of the Southwest Light Rail project.

=== Housing ===
Elkins has written many bills to address housing prices and supply, including a Housing Affordability Act in 2021, saying, "NIMBYism is alive and well" in Minnesota. He wrote an op-ed calling for cities to pursue rule changes and zoning policies that promote the creation of more affordable housing on smaller lots. He authored legislation that would limit cities' power to regulate development and local zoning practices in order to increase housing supply and reduce prices and rents. His bill would also allow cities to impose development and street maintenance fees in exchange for eliminating their power to declare development moratoriums and requiring cities to allow duplexes in any residential area. City councils around Minnesota and the League of Minnesota Cities have opposed Elkins's efforts.

=== Other political positions ===
Elkins supports ranked-choice voting and authored legislation to expand its use to state and federal general and primary elections in Minnesota. He wrote a bill to give major political parties more power over which candidates can run under their party name and make it easier for minor parties to qualify candidates for legislative offices, lowering the threshold for major party status from five percent to one percent.

Elkins authored the Minnesota Consumer Data Privacy Act, which would increase privacy rights for Minnesota residents. He also worked on legislation to update Minnesota's antitrust laws. Elkins supported a ban on the use of conversion therapy in Bloomington. He wrote legislation to allow cities to ban the use of plastic bags. Elkins was part of a bipartisan group of state legislators that traveled to Israel and the West Bank in 2019.

== Electoral history ==
2018 Minnesota State House - District 49B
Party	Candidate	Votes	%
Democratic (DFL)	Steve Elkins	15,264	61.69
Republican	Matt Sikich	9,446	38.17
Write-in		34	0.21
Total votes		24,744	100.0
Democratic (DFL) hold			

2020 Minnesota State House - District 49B
Party	Candidate	Votes	%
Democratic (DFL)	Steve Elkins (incumbent)	17,883	62.22
Republican	Joe Thalman	10,836	37.70
Write-in		21	0.07
Total votes		28,740	100.0
Democratic (DFL) hold			

2022 DFL Primary for Minnesota State House - District 50B
Party	Candidate	Votes	%
Democratic (DFL)	Steve Elkins	3,179	61.09
Democratic (DFL)	Andrew Carlson	2,025	38.91
Total votes		5,204	100.0

2022 Minnesota State House - District 50B
Party	Candidate	Votes	%
Democratic (DFL)	Steve Elkins (incumbent)	14,425	63.05
Republican	Beth Beebe	8,437	36.88
Write-in		15	0.07
Total votes		22,877	100.0
Democratic (DFL) hold			

2024 Minnesota State House - District 50B
Party	Candidate	Votes	%
Democratic (DFL)	Steve Elkins (incumbent)	16,524	63.18
Republican	Bob Gust	9,596	36.69
Write-in		33	0.13
Total votes		26,153	100.00
Democratic (DFL) hold			

== Personal life ==
Elkins and his wife, Judy, have two children. He resides in Bloomington, Minnesota.
