= Aisha Gomez =

American politician (born 1981)

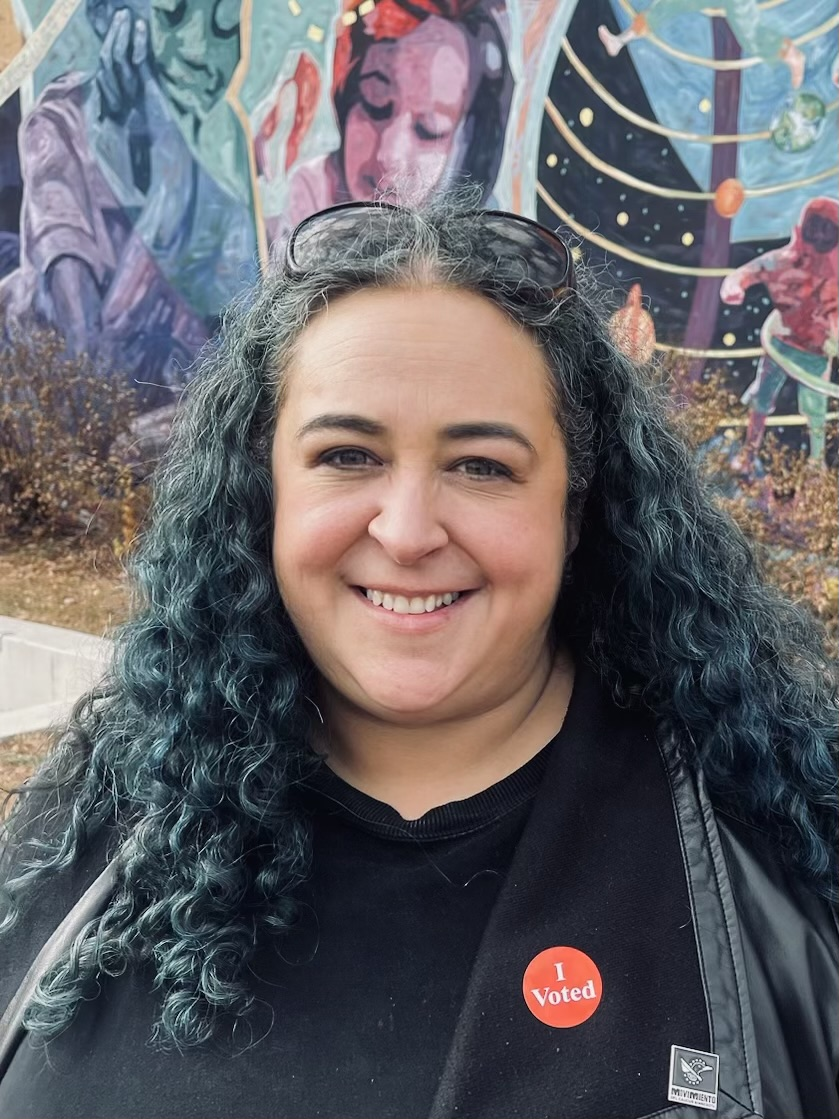
- Gomez after voting in 2022

Member of the Minnesota House of Representatives from the 62A district
- Incumbent
- Assumed office January 8, 2019
- Preceded by: Susan Allen

Personal details
- Born: Aisha Sarah Gomez-Spiers; July 22, 1981 (age 45)
- Party: Democratic (DFL)
- Children: 1
- Education: University of Minnesota (B.S.)
- Occupation: Legislator
- Website: Government website Campaign website

Aisha Sarah Gomez-Spiers (born July 22, 1981) is an American politician serving since 2019 in the Minnesota House of Representatives. A member of the Minnesota Democratic–Farmer–Labor Party (DFL), Gomez represents District 62A, which includes parts of south Minneapolis in Hennepin County bisected by Interstate 35W.

== Early life, education, and career ==
Gomez graduated from South High School in Minneapolis and attended the University of Minnesota, graduating with a B.S. in environmental science.

Before running for political office, Gomez worked with the Women's Environmental Institute for more than a decade and was a senior policy aide to Minneapolis City Council member Alondra Cano.

== Minnesota House of Representatives ==
Gomez was first elected to the Minnesota House of Representatives in 2018. She ran after four-term incumbent Susan Allen announced in 2017 that she would not seek reelection.

Gomez co-chairs the Taxes Committee and is a member of the Property Tax Division and Ways and Means Committee. From 2021 to 2022, she chaired the Preventing Homelessness Division of the Housing Finance and Policy Committee. Gomez, who is of Latino, Arab, and Jewish heritage, is a member of the House People of Color and Indigenous (POCI) Caucus.

== Policy positions ==
=== Taxes ===
At the start of the 2023 legislative session, Gomez authored a tax conformity bill that was the first bill to pass the House floor. It received unanimous bipartisan support in both chambers. Gomez supported a 2021 tax bill compromise that included funding to address youth homelessness across the state. She supports legalizing marijuana and has advocated for low taxes in order to "bring people out of the illicit market and into a regulated market".

=== Public safety and police reform ===
In 2020, Gomez represented the intersection in Minneapolis where the police murder of George Floyd took place. After Floyd was murdered, she released a statement saying, "This is why we talk about police abolition. There is no reform that can fix this system." Gomez authored legislation requiring departments of over 50 officers to institute civilian oversight boards to improve accountability. She has been critical of the Minneapolis police, especially their use of chemical agents on crowds, introducing legislation to ban the use of irritants and nonlethal ammunition, calling them "cruel and escalatory".

In 2021, Gomez cosigned a letter by U.S. Representative Ilhan Omar asking the Department of Justice to expand its investigation into the Minneapolis Police Department after Floyd's murder. During the 2021 Minneapolis mayoral election, she signed on to a letter that advocated for a new mayor who would do more to end racial disparities and increase public safety.

=== Immigration policy ===
Gomez led the House's efforts to pass the Driver's Licenses for All bill, which allows undocumented immigrants to obtain a driver's license. That had been legal in Minnesota until 2003, when Governor Tim Pawlenty signed legislation ending the practice. Gomez authored legislation to ensure municipal ID application information was private and not accessible by federal immigration authorities. In 2020, during the COVID-19 pandemic, she introduced a bill to establish state relief grants for immigrants not eligible for federal COVID relief, such as stimulus checks. Gomez sponsored legislation to ban for-profit immigration detention centers in Minnesota.

=== Housing, youth, and health care ===
Gomez has led efforts to address homelessness, especially for youth and in families with school-age children. In 2019, Gomez publicly criticized legislators for failing to address the opioid epidemic, calling out the pharmaceutical industry's campaign contributions. In 2022, she introduced a bill to increase funding for shelter-based mental health services and require that cities take certain steps before clearing homeless encampments.

=== Higher education ===
During the 2019 selection process for the University of Minnesota Board of Regents, which must be confirmed by the legislature, Gomez and other legislators criticized the list of candidates for its lack of diversity. In June 2020, Gomez co-authored an op-ed calling for a more racially equitable transit system and investment in transit lines that run through historically marginalized communities.

=== Environmental policy ===
In January 2021, Gomez signed on to a letter calling on the Biden administration to stop Line 3, a tar sands pipeline proposed to cut through Minnesota tribal lands. In August 2021, she opposed city plans to turn a site in Minneapolis's East Phillips neighborhood into a public works campus instead of a community center and garden.

== Electoral history ==
2018 Minnesota State House - District 62B
Party	Candidate	Votes	%
Democratic (DFL)	Aisha Gomez	17,928	92.07
Republican	Ronald W. Peterson	1,502	7.71
Write-in		42	0.22
Total votes		19,472	100.0
Democratic (DFL) hold			

2020 Minnesota State House - District 62B
Party	Candidate	Votes	%
Democratic (DFL)	Aisha Gomez (incumbent)	19,121	90.95
Republican	Ross Tenneson	1,872	8.90
Write-in		30	0.14
Total votes		21,023	100.0
Democratic (DFL) hold			

2022 DFL Primary for Minnesota State House - District 62A
Party	Candidate	Votes	%
Democratic (DFL)	Aisha Gomez (incumbent)	4,167	69.44
Democratic (DFL)	Osman Ahmed	1,834	30.56
Total votes		6,001	100.0

2022 Minnesota State House - District 62A
Party	Candidate	Votes	%
Democratic (DFL)	Aisha Gomez (incumbent)	10,961	98.77
Write-in		137	1.23
Total votes		11,098	100.0
Democratic (DFL) hold			

=== Results ===
2024 Minnesota State House - District 62A
Party	Candidate	Votes	%
Democratic (DFL)	Aisha Gomez (incumbent)	13,349	90.07
Republican	Alexandra (ZaZa) Hoffman Novick	1,434	9.68
Write-in		38	0.26
Total votes		14,821	100.0
Democratic (DFL) hold			

== Personal life ==
Gomez lives in south Minneapolis. She is of both Latina and Arab ethnicity and identifies with the Jewish faith.
