= Jean Wagenius =

American politician (born 1941)

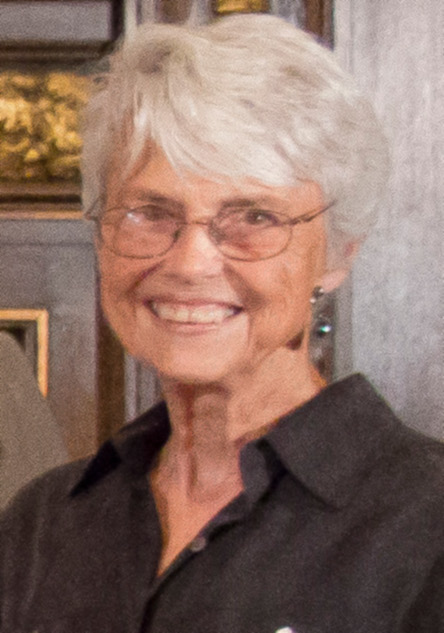

Member of the Minnesota House of Representatives
- In office January 6, 1987 – January 5, 2021
- Preceded by: John Brandl
- Succeeded by: Emma Greenman
- Constituency: 62B (1987–1993); 63A (1993–2003); 62B (2003–2013); 63B (2013–2021)

Personal details
- Born: October 1941 (age 84) Washington, D.C., U.S.
- Party: Democratic
- Spouse: Dwight
- Children: 2
- Education: George Washington University (BA); William Mitchell College of Law (JD)

Jean D. Wagenius (born October 1941) is an American politician who served as a member of the Minnesota House of Representatives from 1987 to 2021. A member of the Democratic–Farmer–Labor Party (DFL), she represented District 63B, which includes portions of the city of Minneapolis in Hennepin County, which is part of the Twin Cities metropolitan area. She is an attorney and worked previously as a staff attorney for the Minnesota Court of Appeals.

== Early life and education ==
Wagenius earned a Bachelor of Arts degree from George Washington University in 1963 and a Juris Doctor from William Mitchell College of Law in 1983. She also attended the Jane Addams College of Social Work at the University of Illinois in the 1960s.

== Career ==
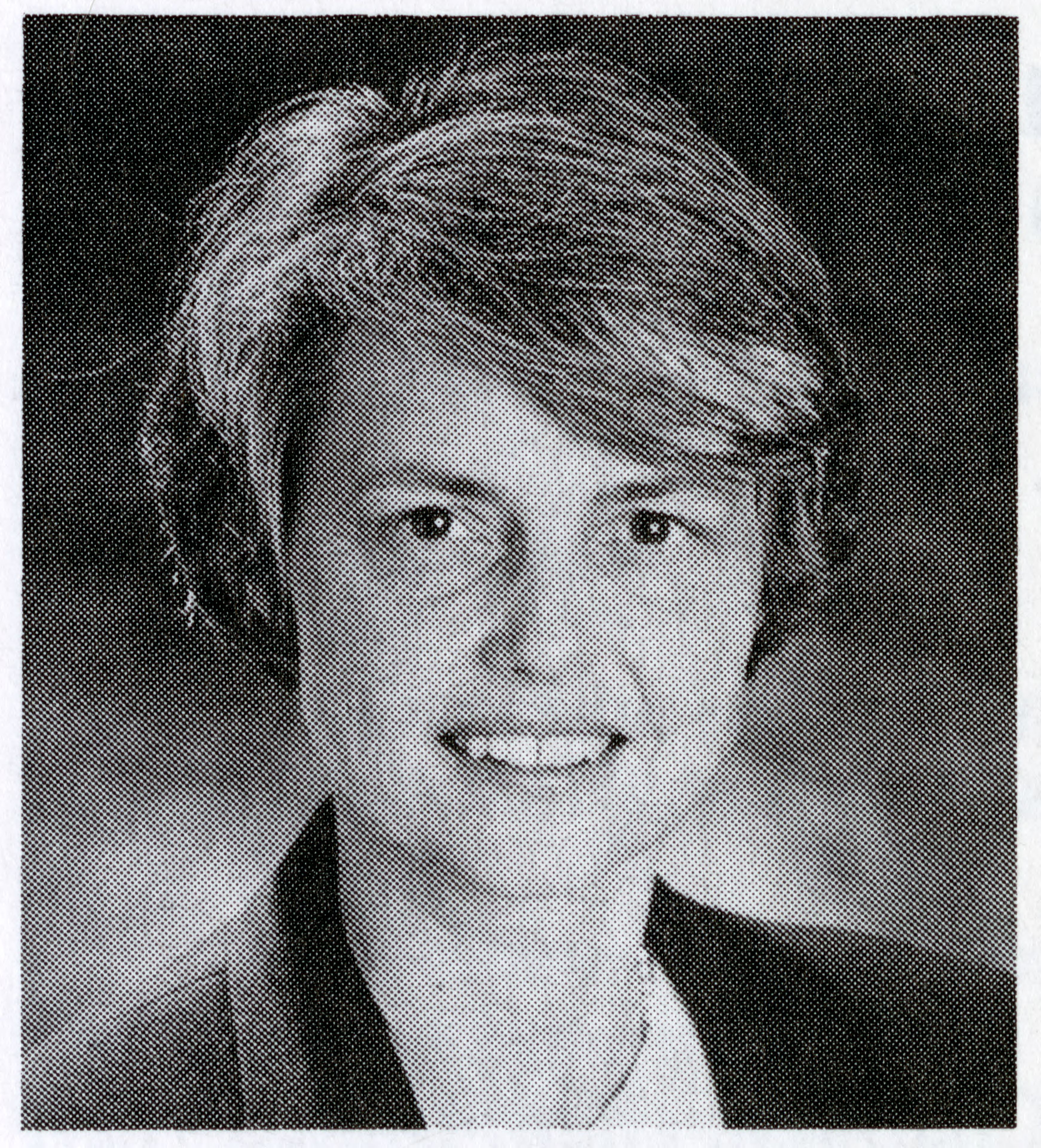
Representative Jean D. Wagenius, 1991-1992 Legislative Session, Minnesota Legislature

Wagenius worked at Peace Corps Headquarters, selecting and placing new volunteers.

Wagenius was first elected in 1986 and was reelected every two years until 2020. Due to legislative redistricting in 1992, her district was known as 63A from 1993 to 2003.
