= Geri Evans =

American politician and teacher (1940–2018)

Member of the Minnesota House of Representatives from the 50B district
- In office 1993–1995
- In office 1997–1999
- In office 2001–2003

Personal details
- Party: DFL

Geraldine Fae (née Sparks) Evans (September 6, 1940 – March 30, 2018) was an American politician and teacher.

Born in Blue Earth, Minnesota, Evans received her bachelor's degree from Gustavus Adolphus College, and her master's and doctorate degrees from University of Minnesota. Evans taught school in New Brighton, Minnesota. She served on the St. Anthony-New Brighton School Board from 1988 to 1992 and was the chair of the school board. Evans was a Democrat. Evans served in the Minnesota House of Representatives from 1993 to 1995, from 1997 to 1999, and from 2001 to 2003. Evans died on March 30, 2018, in New Brighton, Minnesota.
