= Jeff Hayden =

American politician (born 1966)

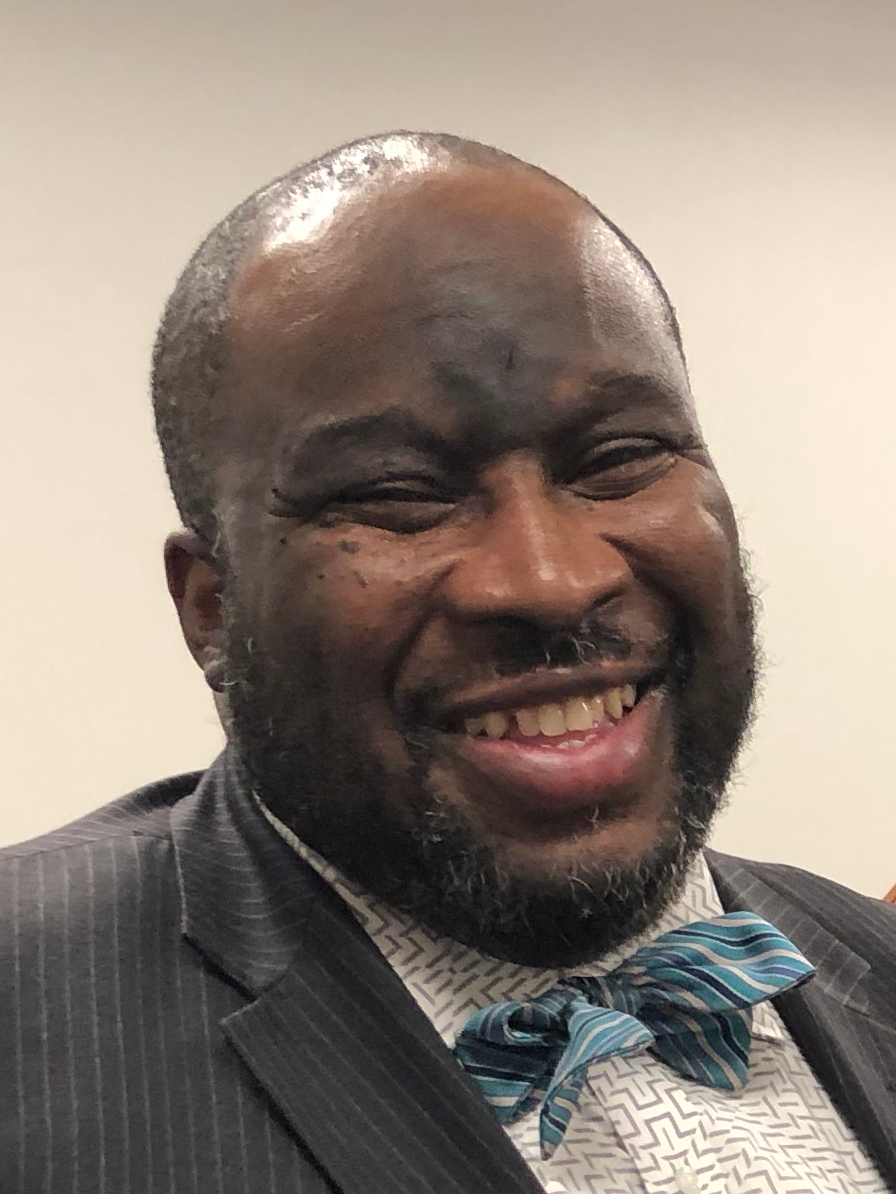
- Hayden in 2019

Member of the Minnesota Senate
- In office October 25, 2011 – January 4, 2021
- Preceded by: Linda Berglin
- Succeeded by: Omar Fateh
- Constituency: 62nd district (2013–2021); 61st district (2011–2013)

Member of the Minnesota House of Representatives from the 61B district
- In office January 6, 2009 – October 25, 2011
- Preceded by: Neva Walker
- Succeeded by: Susan Allen

Personal details
- Born: Jeffrey D. Hayden; September 24, 1966 (age 60) San Francisco, California, U.S.
- Party: Minnesota Democratic–Farmer–Labor Party
- Spouse: Terri Hayden
- Children: 2
- Education: Bethel University; Metropolitan State University
- Occupation: Non-profit manager, community organizer, legislator

Jeffrey D. Hayden (born September 24, 1966) is an American politician and former member of the Minnesota Senate. A member of the Minnesota Democratic–Farmer–Labor Party (DFL), he represented District 62, which includes portions of south Minneapolis in Hennepin County in the Twin Cities metropolitan area.

== Early life, education, and career ==
Hayden was born in San Francisco. He worked as a staff aide to Minneapolis City Council member Gary Schiff from 2001-2002. He later attended Bethel University, obtaining a B.A. in communication studies.

== Minnesota House of Representatives ==
Hayden was first elected in 2008, opting to run after incumbent Rep. Neva Walker decided not to seek re-election. He was re-elected in 2010.

== Minnesota Senate ==
On July 25, 2011, Hayden announced that he would run in the October 18, 2011, special election to fill the state senate seat that was vacated by Senator Linda Berglin, who resigned on August 15, 2011, to take a new job with Hennepin County as a health policy program manager. His candidacy was endorsed by the DFL Party on August 27, 2011. On October 18, 2011, he won the special election with 61 percent of the vote over Green Party candidate Farheen Hakeem, Republican candidate Bruce Lundeen, and Independence Party candidate Matt Brillhart. He was re-elected in 2012.

== Community involvement ==
Hayden is a non-profit manager for Hearth Connection, which provides affordable housing advocacy. He is a founding member of the City of Lakes Community Land Trust. He also served on the board of directors of the Bryant Neighborhood Association and of the Powderhorn Park Neighborhood Association, and as board member of Community Action of Minneapolis.

== Investigations ==
In October 2015, a court-sanctioned investigation found that Hayden and his wife Theresa received at least $3,486 in improper reimbursements from a now-defunct nonprofit organization, Community Action of Minneapolis. On August 11, 2020, Hayden lost the DFL primary to Omar Fateh, a progressive candidate.
