= Ann Lenczewski =

American politician

Member of the Minnesota House of Representatives from the 50B district 40B (1999–2013)
- In office January 5, 1999 – December 15, 2015
- Preceded by: Kevin Knight (40B), Kate Knuth (50B)
- Succeeded by: Chad Anderson

Personal details
- Born: May 9, 1960 (age 66) Bloomington, Minnesota
- Party: Minnesota Democratic–Farmer–Labor Party
- Spouse: Nels Erickson
- Children: 4
- Education: College of Saint Benedict; Humphrey Institute of Public Affairs
- Occupation: lobbyist

Ann T. Lenczewski (born May 9, 1960) is a Minnesota politician and former member of the Minnesota House of Representatives. A member of the Minnesota Democratic–Farmer–Labor Party (DFL), she represented District 50B, which included portions of the city of Bloomington in Hennepin County in the Twin Cities metropolitan area.

== Early life, education, and career ==
Lenczewski graduated from Bloomington Jefferson High School in Bloomington, then went on to the College of Saint Benedict in St. Joseph, graduating with a B.A. in Psychology. She later attended graduate school at the Humphrey Institute of Public Affairs at the University of Minnesota. She served on the Bloomington Planning and Parks Commission, and was elected to the Bloomington City Council in 1993, serving from 1994 to 1998.

== Minnesota House of Representatives ==
Lenczewski was first elected in 1998 and was re-elected every two years since then. She resigned effective December 15, 2015 to join Lockridge Grindal Nauen P.L.L.P.

== Personal life ==
Lenczewski is married to Nels Erickson. They have four children and reside in Bloomington, Minnesota.
