= Karen Clark (American politician) =

American politician (1945–2026)

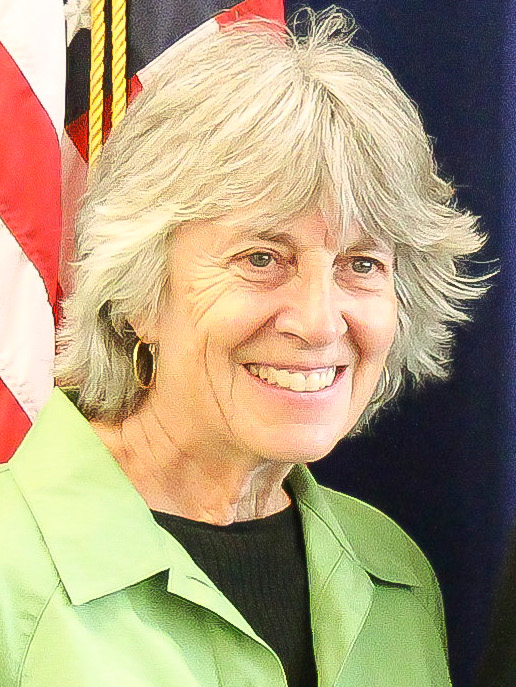
- Clark in 2014

Member of the Minnesota House of Representatives from the 62A district 59A (1981–1983), 60A (1983–1993), 61A (1993–2013)
- In office January 6, 1981 – January 7, 2019
- Preceded by: Linda Berglin
- Succeeded by: Hodan Hassan

Personal details
- Born: July 23, 1945 Fort Sill, Oklahoma, U.S.
- Died: June 30, 2026 (aged 80)
- Party: Minnesota Democratic–Farmer–Labor Party
- Spouse: Jacquelyn Zita (m. 2015)
- Education: College of St. Teresa (BS); Harvard University (MPA)
- Occupation: College instructor

Karen J. Clark (July 23, 1945 – June 30, 2026) was an American politician and onetime member of the Minnesota House of Representatives. A member of the Minnesota Democratic–Farmer–Labor Party (DFL), she represented District 62A, which included portions of the city of Minneapolis in the Twin Cities metropolitan area including portions of the Whittier, Phillips, Ventura Village, Seward, and Lyn-Lake neighborhoods. She was the longest-serving openly lesbian member to serve in a state legislature in the United States. On December 8, 2017, Clark announced in a press release that she would not be running for reelection.

== Early life, education and career ==
Raised on a farm in southwestern Minnesota, Clark attended public schools in Edgerton, graduating from Edgerton High School in 1963. She earned her B.S. in nursing at the College of Saint Teresa in Winona. She later attended the John F. Kennedy School of Government at Harvard University in Cambridge, Massachusetts, earning her Master of Public Administration degree in 1996.

Clark was an instructor at the University of Minnesota beginning in 1985. She had previously worked as public health nurse, VISTA nurse-organizer and an OB-GYN Nurse Practitioner. She was a member of the adjunct Faculty of the Department of Human Relations at St. Cloud State University, of the University of Minnesota's Women's Studies Department, of the Macalester College Women's Studies Department, and of the College of St. Catherine Graduate School of Holistic Health. She was a member of AFSCME.

== Minnesota House of Representatives ==
Clark was first elected in 1980 and was re-elected every two years until retiring in 2018.

She chaired the Governmental Operations Subcommittee for Jobs Creation and Unemployment Issues, the Economic Development and Housing Subcommittee for Job Development and Training, the Economic Development Subcommittee for the Community Stabilization and Development Division, the Housing Committee, the Economic Development and International Trade Subcommittee for the Housing and Housing Finance Division, and the Finance Subcommittee for the Housing Policy and Finance and Public Health Finance Division.

== Political career ==
=== Advocacy for LGBTQ+ rights ===
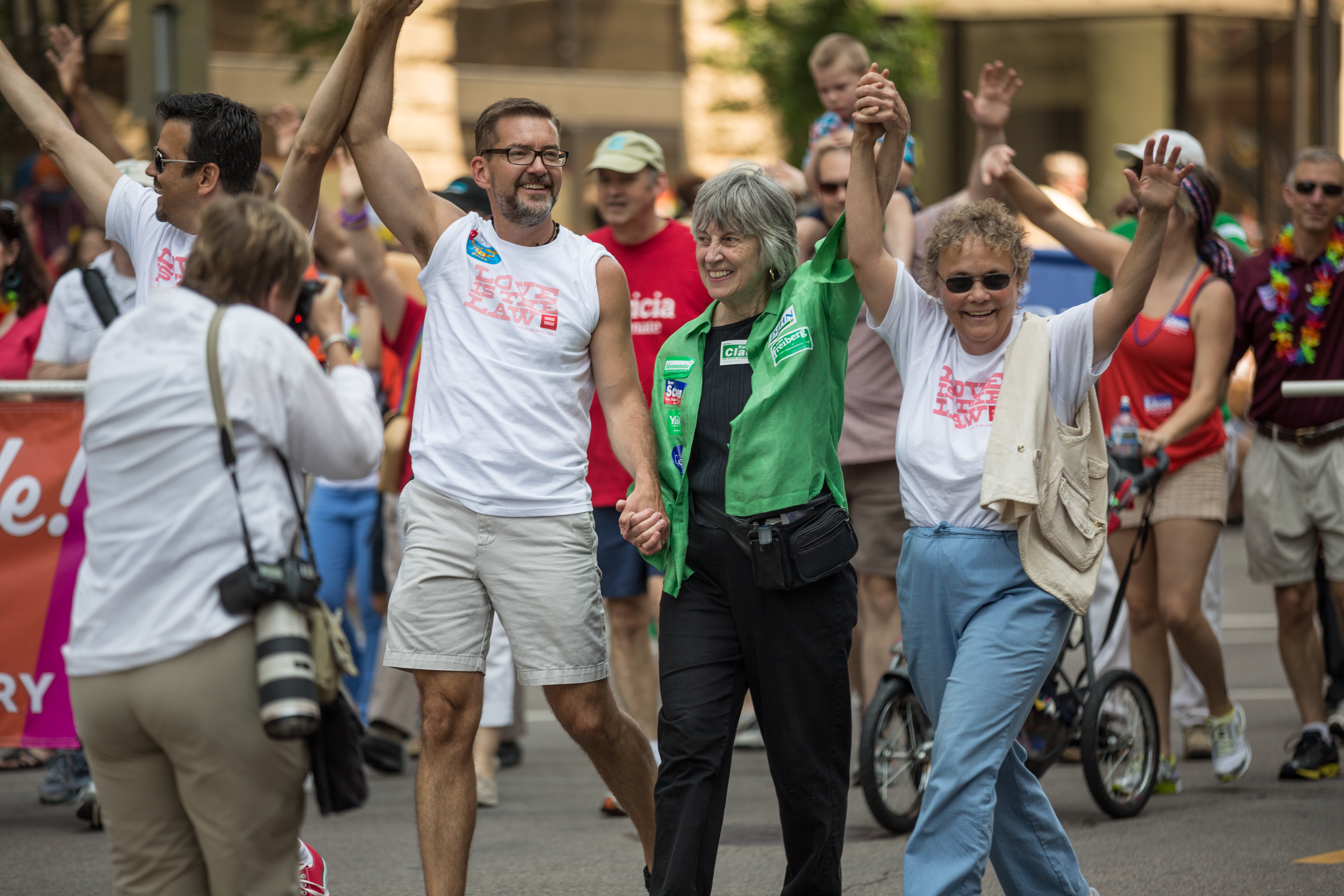
Clark and Scott Dibble at the Twin Cities Pride Parade, 2013

Clark was a lesbian, and was one of four openly gay members of the Minnesota Legislature, along with Rep. and Speaker of the Minnesota House Allan Spear, Senator Scott Dibble and Rep. Susan Allen, a Minneapolis Democrats. While Spear, who came out in 1974 while already serving in the Minnesota House of Representatives, was the first openly gay lawmaker of the Minnesota state legislature, Clark, who was elected to the Minnesota House of Representatives in 1980, was the first openly gay person to run and be elected to the Minnesota state legislature. In 1990, she served on Minnesota Governor Rudy Perpich's Task Force on Lesbian and Gay Minnesotans. In 1993, she played a critical role alongside Spear in passing an amendment to the Minnesota Human Rights Act that banned LGBT discrimination in housing, employment, and education.

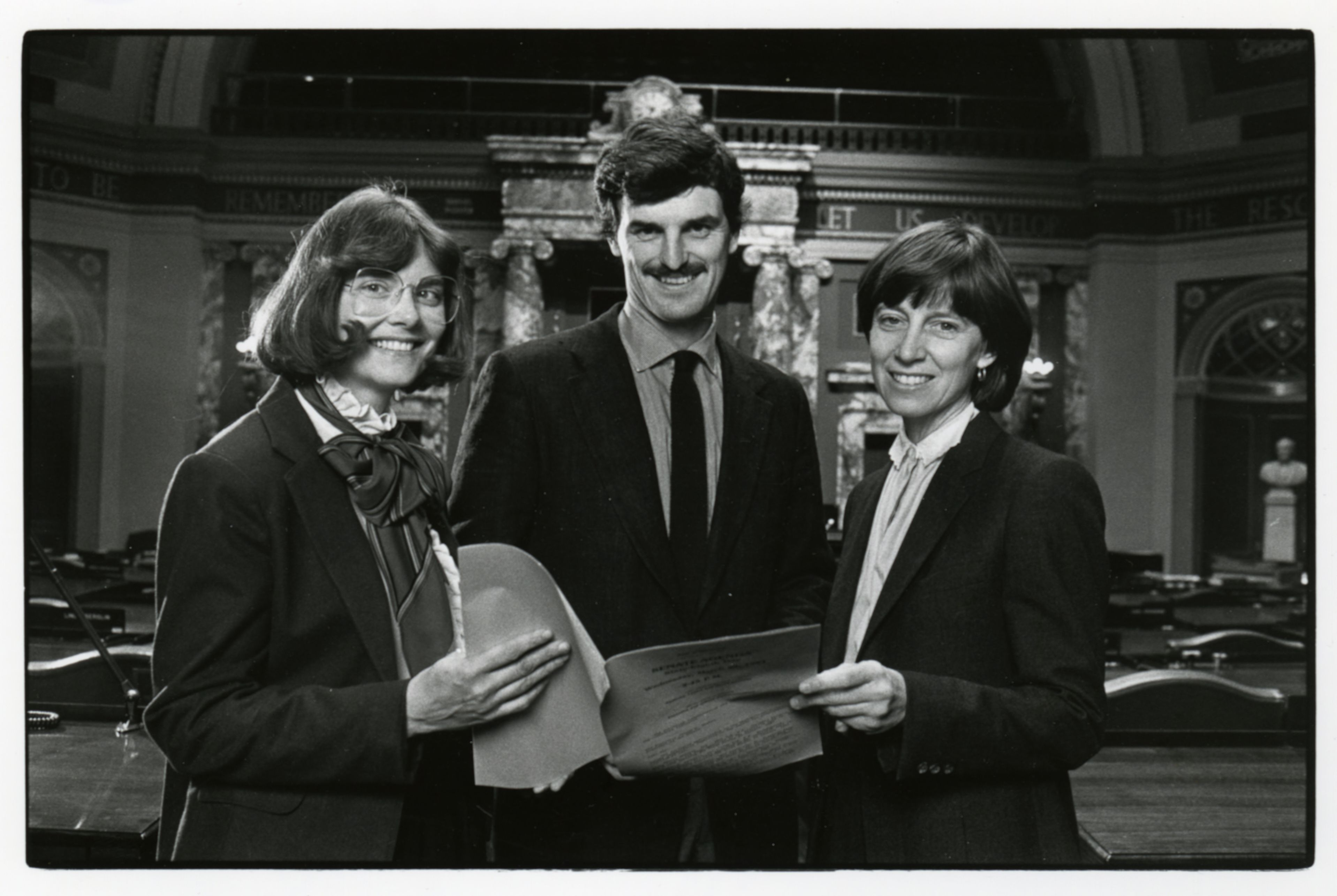
Representative Karen Clark poses with Senator Linda Berglin and Representative Peter McLaughlin in the Senate Chamber, St. Paul, Minnesota.

After the Minnesota House voted on May 21, 2011, to place a gay marriage amendment referendum on the ballot in the 2012 general election, Clark and Dibble released a joint statement condemning the referendum. The referendum had voters decide whether a legal marriage was defined as between one man and one woman.

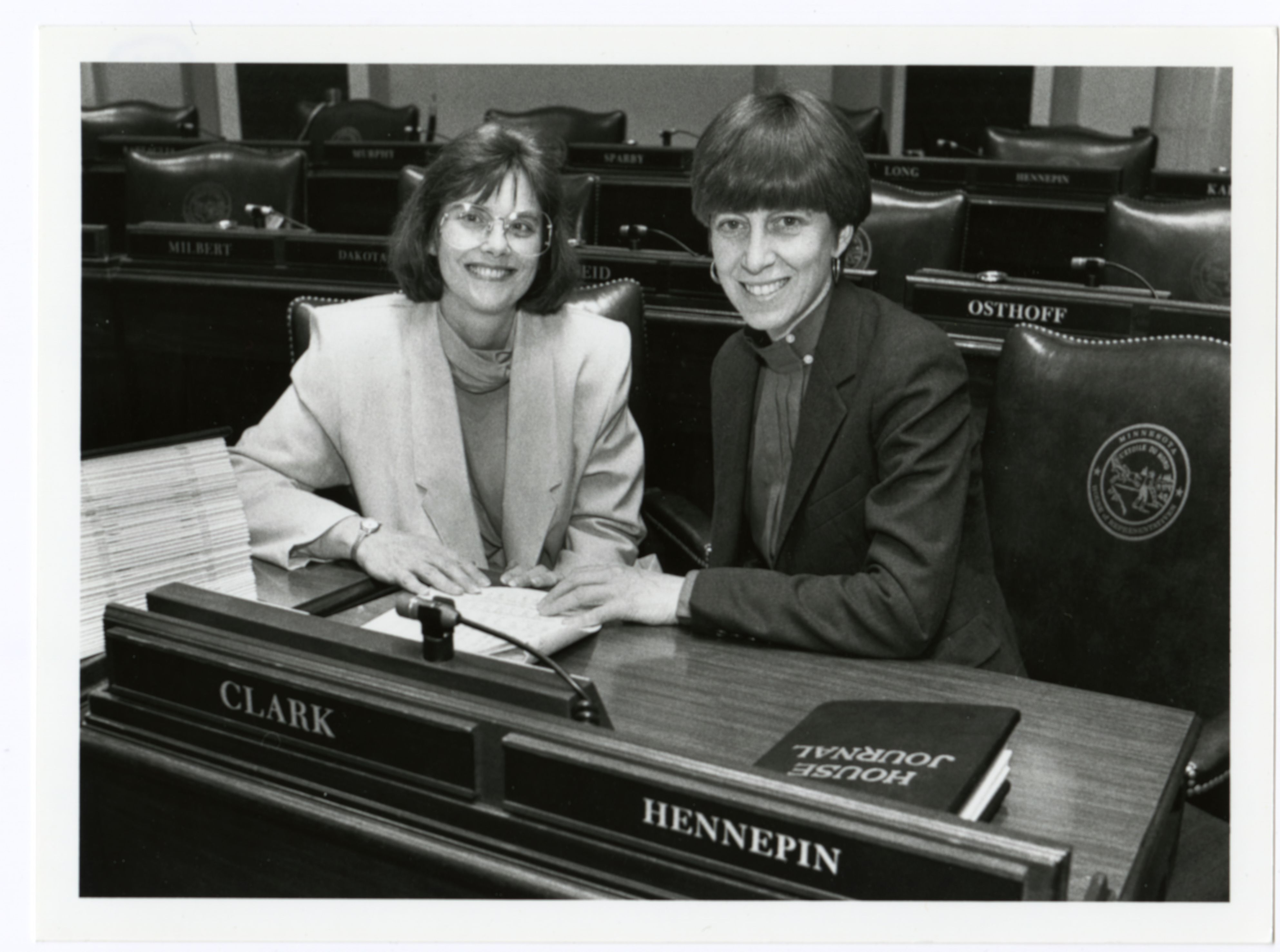
Representative Karen Clark poses with Senator Linda Berglin in the House Chamber, St. Paul, Minnesota.

Following the May 2011 House vote on the gay marriage amendment referendum, Clark stated: "It's a sad day for the State of Minnesota. Tonight, we've moved one step closer to discriminating against Minnesotans simply based on who they love. This amendment won't help a single family in Minnesota, and this vote is absolutely heartbreaking to thousands of people and families across our state. History will not look back kindly on this day or the people who voted for discrimination. The Minnesota I know is a place of inclusion, tolerance and love, and I truly believe the people of this great state will not vote to enshrine discrimination in our constitution..."

In 2013, after voters voted against the amendment, Clark was the House sponsor of an effort to legalize same-sex marriage. The act passed the House 75–59, as well as the Senate, and was later signed into law by Governor Mark Dayton. It took effect on July 1, 2013. (See also Same-sex marriage in Minnesota.)

=== Environmental advocacy ===
Clark was vocal in supporting protesters at Standing Rock who were part of the Dakota Access Pipeline Protests. On October 28, 2016, she read a speech urging Hennepin County Sheriff, Richard Stanek to withdraw deputies from Standing Rock.

=== Immigration ===
On May 25, 2017, Clark engaged in a hunger strike to show solidarity with protesters of a proposed public safety bill that would limit undocumented immigrants' ability to obtain driver's licenses.

== Personal life and death ==
Clark and her domestic partner Jacqueline Zita were together for 35 years, and married 11 years prior to her death.

She was Catholic.

Clark died on June 30, 2026, at the age of 80.
