= Scott Dibble (politician) =

American politician (born 1965)

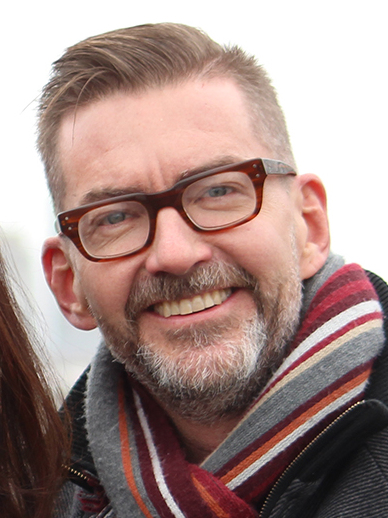

Member of the Minnesota Senate from the 61st district 60th (2003–2013)
- Incumbent
- Assumed office January 7, 2003
- Preceded by: Myron Orfield

Member of the Minnesota House of Representatives from the 60B district
- In office January 3, 2001 – January 6, 2003
- Preceded by: Myron Orfield
- Succeeded by: district redrawn

Personal details
- Born: August 27, 1965 (age 61) New York City, New York
- Party: Democratic (DFL)
- Spouse: Richard Leyva (m. 2008)
- Education: University of St. Thomas; University of Minnesota
- Occupation: legislator

David Scott Dibble (born August 27, 1965) is an American politician serving as a member of the Minnesota Senate since 2003. A member of the Minnesota Democratic–Farmer–Labor Party (DFL), Dibble represents District 61, which includes parts of Minneapolis in Hennepin County. From 2001 to 2003, he served in the Minnesota House of Representatives.

Dibble was the first openly gay man to run for and be elected to the Minnesota Legislature without previously having held a seat in it.

== Early life and education ==
Dibble was born in New York City, New York. The child of a member of the United States Air Force, he moved often as a child before settling in Minnesota and graduating from Apple Valley High School.

Dibble attended both the University of St. Thomas in Saint Paul and the University of Minnesota. In 2002, he completed a fellowship at the University of Minnesota's Humphrey School of Public Affairs.

== Early activism and career ==
Dibble first became involved in politics in the mid-1980s, working on civil rights issues for the gay, lesbian, bisexual, and transgender (LGBT) communities, including advocacy for those with HIV/AIDS. He was an activist and organizer for "It's Time, Minnesota", a statewide LGBT rights organization that helped pass the 1993 Minnesota Human Rights Act. This led to organizing on issues of social and economic justice, especially in the areas of neighborhood livability, transportation, housing, energy and the environment.

Dibble worked in information technology support for Investors Diversified Services (now Ameriprise Financial) and later as a community organizer. He was an aide to Minneapolis City Council Member Doré Mead from 1994 to 2000.

== Minnesota House of Representatives ==
Dibble was elected to the Minnesota House of Representatives in 2000 and served one term, representing District 60B. He served on the Local Government and Metropolitan Affairs, Transportation Policy, and Ways and Means committees.

== Minnesota Senate ==
Dibble was elected to the Minnesota Senate in 2002, and reelected in 2006, 2010, 2012, 2016, 2020, and 2022. He first ran in 2002 after incumbent Myron Orfield announced his retirement.

Dibble has served as chair of the Transportation Finance and Policy Committee since 2023. He also sits on the Capital Investment, the Energy, Utilities, and Climate, and the Taxes Committees. From 2013 to 2017, Dibble chaired the Transportation and Public Safety Committee. He chaired the Transit Subdivision of the Transportation Budget and Policy Division from 2007 to 2011, and the Housing Division of the Jobs, Energy and Community Development Committee from 2003 to 2007.

=== Political positions ===
==== Same-sex marriage ====
After his leadership in the campaign against the constitutional amendment to ban same-sex marriage in Minnesota, Dibble, Representative Karen Clark, and several other legislators proposed an amendment during the 2013 legislative session to legalize same-sex marriage. The bill passed and same-sex marriage became legal on August 1, 2013.

==== The environment ====
Dibble has served as chief author or as a lead negotiator on energy efficiency standards, implementing a renewable energy standard, establishing a carbon dioxide reduction mandate, instituting the nation's most stringent mercury emission reduction requirements for coal-fired energy, the first legislation in the country on hybrid plug in electric cars, and programs to aid the construction of green buildings and assist local governments in building more energy-efficient facilities. He helped author and served on the Green Jobs Task Force charged with developing a comprehensive economic development policy to shape Minnesota's participation in the green economy.

==== Medical cannabis ====
In 2014, Dibble was the chief author of a bill that allowed limited use of medical cannabis for patients who have debilitating or terminal illnesses. He has also worked to legalize cannabis for recreational use.

==== Transportation ====
Dibble continues to be the DFL leader in the Minnesota Senate on legislation relating to transportation and transit, energy efficiency, the environment, housing and economic development.

== Personal life ==
Dibble is openly gay. He married his husband, Richard Leyva, in California before the passage of Proposition 8. In November 2019, Dibble announced that a man whom Dibble had had an extramarital relationship with had allegedly attempted to blackmail him through revenge porn.

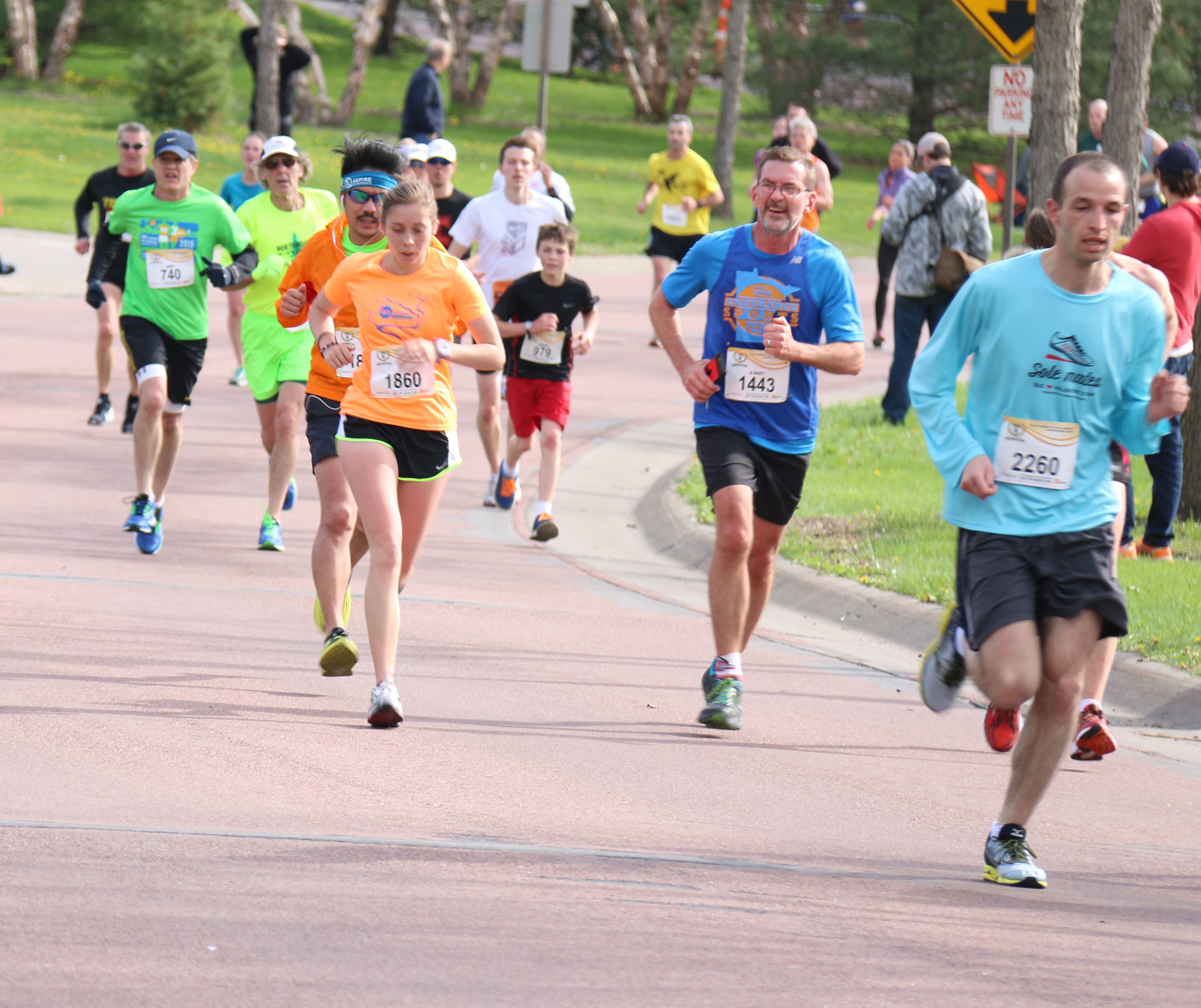
Dibble (wearing number 1443) near the finish of a Minneapolis 10k race in 2016

Dibble is a runner and has completed several marathons.
