= List of Minnesota state legislatures =

This article lists the legislative sessions of the Minnesota Legislature, the bicameral governing body of the U.S. state of Minnesota, which is composed of the Minnesota House of Representatives and the Minnesota Senate. The legislature has convened many times since statehood became effective on May 11, 1858, though its first session began prior to statehood. It continues to operate under the Minnesota State Constitution of 1858. Sessions are numbered consecutively, with each biennium marked by a new legislature. The list provides an overview of each session, including the dates they were convened and adjourned and the preceding elections. The legislature meets at the Minnesota State Capitol in Saint Paul.

Prior to statehood, there were 8 territorial legislatures (1849 to 1857).

== Legislatures ==
| Name | Start date | End date (Note: End dates listed are the adjournment of the last regular or special session for each legislature, but outgoing members remain in office until the start of the following legislature.) | Last election |
|---|---|---|---|
| 1st Minnesota Legislature | December 2, 1857 | August 12, 1858 | October 13, 1857 |
| 2nd Minnesota Legislature | December 7, 1859 | March 12, 1860 | October 11, 1859 |
| 3rd Minnesota Legislature | January 8, 1861 | March 8, 1861 | November 6, 1860 |
| 4th Minnesota Legislature | January 7, 1862 | September 29, 1862 | October 8, 1861 |
| 5th Minnesota Legislature | January 6, 1863 | March 6, 1863 | November 4, 1862 |
| 6th Minnesota Legislature | January 5, 1864 | March 4, 1864 | November 3, 1863 |
| 7th Minnesota Legislature | January 3, 1865 | March 3, 1865 | November 8, 1864 |
| 8th Minnesota Legislature | January 2, 1866 | March 2, 1866 | November 7, 1865 |
| 9th Minnesota Legislature | January 8, 1867 | March 8, 1867 | November 6, 1866 |
| 10th Minnesota Legislature | January 7,1868 | March 6, 1868 | November 5, 1867 |
| 11th Minnesota Legislature | January 5, 1869 | March 5, 1869 | November 3, 1868 |
| 12th Minnesota Legislature | January 4, 1870 | March 4, 1870 | November 2, 1869 |
| 13th Minnesota Legislature | January 3, 1871 | March 3, 1871 | November 8, 1870 |
| 14th Minnesota Legislature | January 2, 1872 | March 1, 1872 | November 7, 1871 |
| 15th Minnesota Legislature | January 7, 1873 | March 7, 1873 | November 5, 1872 |
| 16th Minnesota Legislature | January 6, 1874 | March 6, 1874 | November 4, 1873 |
| 17th Minnesota Legislature | January 5, 1875 | March 5, 1875 | November 3, 1874 |
| 18th Minnesota Legislature | January 4, 1876 | March 3, 1876 | November 2, 1875 |
| 19th Minnesota Legislature | January 2, 1877 | March 2, 1877 | November 7, 1876 |
| 20th Minnesota Legislature | January 8, 1878 | March 8, 1878 | November 6, 1877 |
| 21st Minnesota Legislature | January 7,1879 | March 7, 1879 | November 5, 1878 |
| 22nd Minnesota Legislature | January 4, 1881 | November 19, 1881 | November 2, 1880 |
| 23rd Minnesota Legislature | January 2, 1883 | March 2, 1883 | November 7, 1882 |
| 24th Minnesota Legislature | January 6, 1885 | March 6, 1885 | November 4, 1884 |
| 25th Minnesota Legislature | January 4, 1887 | March 4, 1887 | November 2, 1886 |
| 26th Minnesota Legislature | January 8, 1889 | April 23, 1889 | November 6, 1888 |
| 27th Minnesota Legislature | January 6, 1891 | April 20, 1891 | November 4, 1890: Senate |
| 28th Minnesota Legislature | January 3, 1893 | April18, 1893 | November 8, 1892 |
| 29th Minnesota Legislature | January 8, 1895 | April 23, 1895 | November 6, 1894: Senate |
| 30th Minnesota Legislature | January 5, 1897 | April 21, 1897 | November 3, 1896 |
| 31st Minnesota Legislature | January 3, 1899 | April 18, 1899 | November 8, 1898: Senate |
| 32nd Minnesota Legislature | January 8, 1901 | March 11, 1902 | November 6, 1900 |
| 33rd Minnesota Legislature | January 6, 1903 | April 21, 1903 | November 4, 1902: Senate |
| 34th Minnesota Legislature | January 3, 1905 | April 18, 1905 | November 8, 1904 |
| 35th Minnesota Legislature | January 8, 1907 | April 24, 1907 | November 6, 1906: Senate |
| 36th Minnesota Legislature | January 5, 1909 | April 22, 1909 | November 3, 1908 |
| 37th Minnesota Legislature | January 3, 1911 | June 18, 1912 | November 8, 1910: House, Senate |
| 38th Minnesota Legislature | January 7, 1913 | April 24, 1913 | November 5, 1912 |
| 39th Minnesota Legislature | January 5, 1915 | October 28, 1916 | November 3, 1914 |
| 40th Minnesota Legislature | January 2, 1917 | April 19, 1917 | November 7, 1916 |
| 41st Minnesota Legislature | January 7, 1919 | September 19, 1919 | November 6, 1918 |
| 42nd Minnesota Legislature | January 4, 1921 | April 21, 1921 | November 2, 1920 |
| 43rd Minnesota Legislature | January 2, 1923 | April 19, 1923 | November 7, 1922 |
| 44th Minnesota Legislature | January 6, 1925 | April 22, 1925 | November 4, 1924 |
| 45th Minnesota Legislature | January 4, 1927 | April 21, 1927 | November 2, 1926 |
| 46th Minnesota Legislature | January 8, 1929 | April 25, 1929 | November 6, 1928 |
| 47th Minnesota Legislature | January 6, 1931 | April 22, 1931 | November 4, 1930 |
| 48th Minnesota Legislature | January 3, 1933 | January 6, 1934 | November 8, 1932 |
| 49th Minnesota Legislature | January 8, 1935 | December 23, 1936 | November 6, 1934 |
| 50th Minnesota Legislature | January 5, 1937 | July 23, 1937 | November 3, 1936 |
| 51st Minnesota Legislature | January 3, 1939 | April 19, 1939 | November 8, 1938 |
| 52nd Minnesota Legislature | January 7, 1941 | April 24, 1941 | November 5, 1940 |
| 53rd Minnesota Legislature | January 5, 1943 | March 11, 1944 | November 3, 1942 |
| 54th Minnesota Legislature | January 2, 1945 | April 19, 1945 | November 7, 1944 |
| 55th Minnesota Legislature | January 7, 1947 | April 24, 1947 | November 5, 1946 |
| 56th Minnesota Legislature | January 4, 1949 | April 21, 1949 | November 2, 1948 |
| 57th Minnesota Legislature | January 2, 1951 | April 24, 1951 | November 7, 1950 |
| 58th Minnesota Legislature | January 6, 1953 | April 22, 1953 | November 4, 1952 |
| 59th Minnesota Legislature | January 4, 1955 | April 26, 1955 | November 2, 1954 |
| 60th Minnesota Legislature | January 8, 1957 | June 26, 1958 | November 6, 1956 |
| 61st Minnesota Legislature | January 6, 1959 | July 1, 1959 | November 4, 1958 |
| 62nd Minnesota Legislature | January 3, 1961 | December 19, 1961 | November 8, 1960 |
| 63rd Minnesota Legislature | January 8, 1963 | May 23, 1963 | November 6, 1962 |
| 64th Minnesota Legislature | January 5, 1965 | May 19, 1966 | November 3, 1964 |
| 65th Minnesota Legislature | January 3, 1967 | June 2, 1967 | November 8, 1966 |
| 66th Minnesota Legislature | January 7, 1969 | May 26, 1969 | November 5, 1968 |
| 67th Minnesota Legislature | January 5, 1971 | October 30, 1971 | November 3, 1970 |
| 68th Minnesota Legislature | January 2, 1973 | March 29, 1974 | November 7, 1972 |
| 69th Minnesota Legislature | January 7, 1975 | April 7, 1976 | November 5, 1974: House |
| 70th Minnesota Legislature | January 4, 1977 | March 24, 1978 | November 2, 1976: House, Senate |
| 71st Minnesota Legislature | January 3, 1979 | April 12, 1980 | November 7, 1978: House |
| 72nd Minnesota Legislature | January 6, 1981 | December 10, 1982 | November 4, 1980: House, Senate |
| 73rd Minnesota Legislature | January 4, 1983 | April 24, 1984 | November 2, 1982: House, Senate |
| 74th Minnesota Legislature | January 8, 1985 | April 2, 1986 | November 6, 1984: House |
| 75th Minnesota Legislature | January 6, 1987 | April 25, 1988 | November 4, 1986: House, Senate |
| 76th Minnesota Legislature | January 3, 1989 | April 25, 1990 | November 8, 1988: House |
| 77th Minnesota Legislature | January 8, 1991 | April 16, 1992 | November 6, 1990: House, Senate |
| 78th Minnesota Legislature | January 5, 1993 | August 31, 1994 | November 3, 1992: House, Senate |
| 79th Minnesota Legislature | January 3, 1995 | April 3, 1996 | November 8, 1994: House |
| 80th Minnesota Legislature | January 7, 1997 | April 22, 1998 | November 5, 1996: House, Senate |
| 81st Minnesota Legislature | January 5, 1999 | May 17, 2000 | November 3, 1998: House |
| 82nd Minnesota Legislature | January 3, 2001 | September 19, 2002 | November 7, 2000: House, Senate |
| 83rd Minnesota Legislature | January 7, 2003 | May 16, 2004 | November 5, 2002: House, Senate |
| 84th Minnesota Legislature | January 4, 2005 | May 21, 2006 | November 2, 2004: House |
| 85th Minnesota Legislature | January 3, 2007 | May 18, 2008 | November 7, 2006: House, Senate |
| 86th Minnesota Legislature | January 6, 2009 | October 18, 2010 | November 4, 2008: House |
| 87th Minnesota Legislature | January 4, 2011 | August 24, 2012 | November 2, 2010: House, Senate |
| 88th Minnesota Legislature | January 8, 2013 | May 16, 2014 | November 6, 2012: House, Senate |
| 89th Minnesota Legislature | January 6, 2015 | May 23, 2016 | November 4, 2014: House |
| 90th Minnesota Legislature | January 3, 2017 | May 20, 2018 | November 8, 2016: House, Senate |
| 91st Minnesota Legislature | January 8, 2019 | December 15, 2020 | November 6, 2018: House |
| 92nd Minnesota Legislature | January 5, 2021 | May 23, 2022 | November 3, 2020: House, Senate |
| 93rd Minnesota Legislature | January 3, 2023 | May 20, 2024 | November 8, 2022: House, Senate |
| 94th Minnesota Legislature | January 14, 2025 | May 18, 2026 | November 5, 2024: House |
| 95th Minnesota Legislature | January 12, 2027 | | November 3, 2026: House, Senate |

== See also ==
- List of speakers of the Minnesota House of Representatives
- List of governors of Minnesota
- Politics of Minnesota
- Elections in Minnesota
- Minnesota State Capitol
- Historical outline of Minnesota
- Lists of United States state legislative sessions
