= 1910 Minnesota Senate election =

- November 8, 1910

All 63 seats in the Minnesota Senate 32 seats needed for a majority
| | Majority party | Minority party | Third party |
|---|---|---|---|
| | GOP | DEM | PRO |
| Party | Republican | Democratic | Prohibition |
| Seats before | 44 | 18 | 0 |
| Seats won | 40 | 20 | 1 |
| Popular vote | 155,865 | 70,243 | 15,948 |
| Percentage | 58.41% | 26.32% | 5.98% |
| | Fourth party | Fifth party | Sixth party |
| | IND | PEO | POP |
| Party | Independent | Populist | Public Ownership |
| Seats before | 1 | 1 | 0 |
| Seats won | 1 | 1 | 0 |
| Popular vote | 6,710 | 3,694 | 13,379 |
| Percentage | 2.51% | 1.38% | 5.01% |

The 1910 Minnesota Senate election was held in the U.S. state of Minnesota on November 8, 1910, to elect members to the Senate of the 37th and 38th Minnesota Legislatures.

The Minnesota Republican Party won a large majority of seats, followed by the Minnesota Democratic Party, the People's Party, and the Prohibition Party. The new Legislature convened on January 3, 1911.

14 Republicans and 4 Democrats were uncontested.

== Background ==
The last election resulted in the Minnesota Republican Party winning a large majority of seats, which they had maintained since the 1859 State Senate Election. The Minnesota Democratic Party was the main competition to the Republicans, although their chances of taking the body were considered slim to none. The major competitions of the election cycle were during the primary season, during which partisans faced off over the issue of the 'county option.' Numerous incumbents lost renomination over the issue.

Major issues of the general election campaign were addressed in a speech by then-Governor Adolph Olson Eberhart on October 5, 1910, in Mankato. He stood by what he called the "distinctly progressive" Republican Party platform. It advocated for a tariff commission that would be composed of non-partisan experts who would have control over taxes on imports, the end of political bossism, strong support for the 'county option' (as opposed to the Prohibitionists who stood for an outright statewide alcohol ban, and the Democrats who offered tepid support for the 'county option'), conservation of natural resources, fair re-apportionment, and additional funding for the state road system.

== Electoral system ==
The 63 members of the Senate were elected from single-member districts via first-past-the-post voting for four-year terms. Contested nominations of the parties for each district were determined by local party primaries. Minor party and independent candidates were nominated by petition. This was the last Minnesota Senate election to be officially partisan until 1976.

== Results ==
Summary of the November 6, 1910 Minnesota Senate election results
| Party | Candidates | Votes | Seats | |
| Party | Candidates | Votes | No. | % |
|---|---|---|---|---|
| Republican Party | 57 | 155,865 | 40 | 58.41 |
| Democratic Party | 36 | 70,243 | 20 | 26.32 |
| Prohibition Party | 10 | 15,948 | 1 | 5.98 |
| People's Party | 1 | 3,694 | 1 | 1.38 |
| Public Ownership Party | 11 | 13,379 | 0 | 5.01 |
| Independent | 5 | 6,710 | 1 | 2.51 |
| Total | | 266,866 | 63 | 100.00 |
Source: Minnesota Secretary of State

=== Results by District ===
| District | Incumbent | | | Candidates | | | | |
| District | Name | Party | First elected | Name | Party | Votes | % | Winner Party |
|---|---|---|---|---|---|---|---|---|
| 1 | John Q. Briggs‡ | Republican | 1906 | Francis A. Duxbury | Republican | 1,657 | 100.00 | Republican |
| 2 | George D. French | Republican | 1908* | M. J. McGrath | Democratic | 2,776 | 48.90 | Democratic |
| 2 | George D. French | Republican | 1908* | George D. French | Republican | 2,652 | 46.71 | Democratic |
| 2 | George D. French | Republican | 1908* | William G. Thompson | Prohibition | 249 | 4.39 | Democratic |
| 3 | Lytle O. Cooke | Republican | 1902 | Lytle O. Cooke | Republican | 2,028 | 52.96 | Republican |
| 3 | Lytle O. Cooke | Republican | 1902 | James A. Carley | Democratic | 1,801 | 47.04 | Republican |
| 4 | Horace H. Witherstine‡ | Democratic | 1902 | Alonzo T. Stebbins | Republican | 1,993 | 50.74 | Republican |
| 4 | Horace H. Witherstine‡ | Democratic | 1902 | James I. Vermilya | Democratic | 1,935 | 49.26 | Republican |
| 5 | Samuel A. Nelson | Republican | 1906 | Samuel A. Nelson | Republican | 2,710 | 100.00 | Republican |
| 6 | Alex S. Campbell‡ | Republican | 1902 | Charles F. Cook | Democratic | 1,791 | 51.03 | Democratic |
| 6 | Alex S. Campbell‡ | Republican | 1902 | Harlan G. Palmer | Republican | 1,719 | 48.97 | Democratic |
| 7 | Daniel E. White‡ | Republican | 1906 | Fremont J. Thoe | Republican | 1,183 | 100.00 | Republican |
| 8 | Thomas E. Cashman | Democratic | 1906 | Thomas E. Cashman | Democratic | 1,926 | 54.38 | Democratic |
| 8 | Thomas E. Cashman | Democratic | 1906 | Samuel A. Rask | Republican | 1,616 | 45.62 | Democratic |
| 9 | Bernhart N. Anderson | Republican | 1906 | Bernhart N. Anderson | Republican | 2,034 | 57.65 | Republican |
| 9 | Bernhart N. Anderson | Republican | 1906 | H. C. Nelson | Democratic | 1,360 | 38.55 | Republican |
| 9 | Bernhart N. Anderson | Republican | 1906 | Henry Kammer | Public Ownership | 134 | 3.80 | Republican |
| 10 | John Moonan | Democratic | 1906 | John Moonan | Democratic | 1,841 | 100.00 | Democratic |
| 11 | Samuel D. Works | Democratic | 1906 | Samuel D. Works | Democratic | 2,745 | 50.16 | Democratic |
| 11 | Samuel D. Works | Democratic | 1906 | Benjamin Taylor | Republican | 2,727 | 49.84 | Democratic |
| 12 | Frank E. Putnam | Republican | 1902 | Frank E. Putnam | Republican | 1,845 | 67.81 | Republican |
| 12 | Frank E. Putnam | Republican | 1902 | A. A. Johnson | Democratic | 876 | 32.19 | Republican |
| 13 | William A. Hinton‡ (Note: It is unclear if Senator Hinton retired or lost re-nomination.) | Republican | 1906 | Julius E. Haycraft | Republican | 3,315 | 100.00 | Republican |
| 14 | Henry E. Hanson‡ | Republican | 1906 | Andrew C. Olson | Republican | 2,111 | 50.53 | Republican |
| 14 | Henry E. Hanson‡ | Republican | 1906 | T. J. Knox | Democratic | 2,067 | 49.47 | Republican |
| 15 | Salathiel B. Bedford | Republican | 1906 | Salathiel B. Bedford | Republican | 2,517 | 56.40 | Republican |
| 15 | Salathiel B. Bedford | Republican | 1906 | A. J. Schaeffer | Democratic | 1,946 | 43.60 | Republican |
| 16 | Edwin H. Canfield§ | Republican | 1906 | Severt B. Duea | Republican | 1,460 | 50.84 | Republican |
| 16 | Edwin H. Canfield§ | Republican | 1906 | Samuel B. Nelson | Democratic | 1,412 | 49.16 | Republican |
| 17 | Virgil B. Seward | Republican | 1906 | Olai A. Lende | Republican | 4,862 | 100.00 | Republican |
| 18 | O. G. Dale | Republican | 1902 | O. G. Dale | Republican | 2,452 | 56.32 | Republican |
| 18 | O. G. Dale | Republican | 1902 | John H. Skogrand | Prohibition | 1,902 | 43.68 | Republican |
| 19 | Frank Clague‡ | Republican | 1906 | Frank Clague | Republican | 4,624 | 100.00 | Republican |
| 20 | Charles A. Johnson‡ | Republican | 1902 | Henry N. Benson | Republican | 1,738 | 100.00 | Republican |
| 21 | Albert A. Poehler | Democratic | 1906 | Albert A. Poehler | Democratic | 1,379 | 61.13 | Democratic |
| 21 | Albert A. Poehler | Democratic | 1906 | J. W. Stark | Republican | 877 | 38.87 | Democratic |
| 22 | Darwin Hall‡ | Republican | 1886, 1906† | Frank Murray | Republican | 2,314 | 59.47 | Republican |
| 22 | Darwin Hall‡ | Republican | 1886, 1906† | T. O'Connor | Independent | 1,577 | 40.53 | Republican |
| 23 | Jonathan W. Wright | Republican | 1906 | Edward P. Peterson | Democratic | 1,810 | 52.72 | Democratic |
| 23 | Jonathan W. Wright | Republican | 1906 | John A. Martner | Independent | 1,027 | 29.92 | Democratic |
| 23 | Jonathan W. Wright | Republican | 1906 | Jonathan W. Wright | Republican | 596 | 17.36 | Democratic |
| 24 | Charles R. Donaldson | Democratic | 1906 | Charles R. Donaldson | Democratic | 1,720 | 100.00 | Democratic |
| 25 | Frederick E. DuToit‡ | Democratic | 1898 | Charles H. Klein | Republican | 1,663 | 54.08 | Republican |
| 25 | Frederick E. DuToit‡ | Democratic | 1898 | J. J. Farrell | Democratic | 1,412 | 45.92 | Republican |
| 26 | Julius A. Coller | Democratic | 1898 | Julius A. Coller | Democratic | 1,029 | 100.00 | Democratic |
| 27 | Harry F. Weis | Democratic | 1906 | Harry F. Weis | Democratic | 2,622 | 100.00 | Democratic |
| 28 | Frank L. Glotzbach | Democratic | 1906 | Frank L. Glotzbach | Democratic | 2,544 | 56.94 | Democratic |
| 28 | Frank L. Glotzbach | Democratic | 1906 | W. F. Schilling | Republican | 1,924 | 43.06 | Democratic |
| 29 | Ole K. Naeseth‡ | Republican | 1902 | Anton J. Rockne | Republican | 2,990 | 61.08 | Republican |
| 29 | Ole K. Naeseth‡ | Republican | 1902 | C. C. Holter | Prohibition | 1,905 | 38.92 | Republican |
| 30 | Albert Schaller | Democratic | 1894 | Albert Schaller | Democratic | 2,512 | 57.60 | Democratic |
| 30 | Albert Schaller | Democratic | 1894 | Marcus W. Brown | Republican | 1,849 | 42.40 | Democratic |
| 31 | George H. Sullivan | Republican | 1906 | George H. Sullivan | Republican | 2,253 | 68.58 | Republican |
| 31 | George H. Sullivan | Republican | 1906 | M. L. Hilliard | Prohibition | 1,032 | 31.42 | Republican |
| 32 | Victor L. Johnson | Republican | 1906 | Victor L. Johnson | Republican | 6,346 | 100.00 | Republican |
| 33 | Winslow W. Dunn | Republican | 1902 | Winslow W. Dunn | Republican | 3,229 | 58.78 | Republican |
| 33 | Winslow W. Dunn | Republican | 1902 | Charles E. Nyberg | Democratic | 2,264 | 41.22 | Republican |
| 34 | Henry McColl§ | Democratic | 1906 | James Handlan | Democratic | 2,602 | 54.55 | Democratic |
| 34 | Henry McColl§ | Democratic | 1906 | Carl Wirth | Republican | 2,168 | 45.45 | Democratic |
| 35 | John C. Hardy‡ | Democratic | 1902 | Peter H. Van Hoven | Democratic | 3,094 | 57.90 | Democratic |
| 35 | John C. Hardy‡ | Democratic | 1902 | Vincent J. Hawkins | Republican | 2,250 | 42.10 | Democratic |
| 36 | Edmund S. Durment§ | Republican | 1906 | James D. Denegre | Republican | 4,572 | 100.00 | Republican |
| 37 | Joseph M. Hackney | Republican | 1906 | Joseph M. Hackney | Republican | 4,711 | 100.00 | Republican |
| 38 | John T. McGowan§ | Democratic | 1898 | Napoleon A. L'Herault | Democratic | 1,616 | 58.94 | Democratic |
| 38 | John T. McGowan§ | Democratic | 1898 | J. W. Shadewald | Republican | 710 | 25.89 | Democratic |
| 38 | John T. McGowan§ | Democratic | 1898 | Charles E. Williams | Public Ownership | 416 | 15.17 | Democratic |
| 39 | James T. Elwell | Republican | 1906 | James T. Elwell | Republican | 2,899 | 64.71 | Republican |
| 39 | James T. Elwell | Republican | 1906 | Frank Plachy Jr. | Democratic | 1,581 | 35.29 | Republican |
| 40 | John F. Calhoun‡ | Republican | 1902 | William S. Dwinnell | Republican | 2,242 | 100.00 | Republican |
| 41 | George P. Wilson | Republican | 1898 | George P. Wilson | Republican | 1,760 | 47.21 | Republican |
| 41 | George P. Wilson | Republican | 1898 | Alonzo Phillips | Democratic | 1,271 | 34.09 | Republican |
| 41 | George P. Wilson | Republican | 1898 | C. M. Erickson | Public Ownership | 697 | 18.70 | Republican |
| 42 | Manley L. Fosseen | Republican | 1906 | Manley L. Fosseen | Republican | 3,544 | 58.06 | Republican |
| 42 | Manley L. Fosseen | Republican | 1906 | John H. Hirt | Public Ownership | 1,479 | 24.23 | Republican |
| 42 | Manley L. Fosseen | Republican | 1906 | S. R. Tollefson | Prohibition | 1,081 | 17.71 | Republican |
| 43 | Edward Everett Smith‡ | Republican | 1898 | Carl L. Wallace | Republican | 6,284 | 75.19 | Republican |
| 43 | Edward Everett Smith‡ | Republican | 1898 | A. T. Ankeny | Democratic | 2,074 | 24.81 | Republican |
| 44 | John W. Pauly | Democratic | 1906 | John W. Pauly | Democratic | 2,506 | 50.07 | Democratic |
| 44 | John W. Pauly | Democratic | 1906 | Thomas H. Girling | Republican | 1,908 | 38.12 | Democratic |
| 44 | John W. Pauly | Democratic | 1906 | Andrew Hanson | Public Ownership | 591 | 11.81 | Democratic |
| 45 | Charles J. Swanson | Republican | 1906 | Charles J. Swanson | Republican | 3,114 | 53.76 | Republican |
| 45 | Charles J. Swanson | Republican | 1906 | William A. Rice | Prohibition | 2,678 | 46.24 | Republican |
| 46 | George C. Carpenter | Republican | 1906 | George C. Carpenter | Republican | 1,644 | 45.64 | Republican |
| 46 | George C. Carpenter | Republican | 1906 | Austin B. Rice | Prohibition | 1,282 | 35.59 | Republican |
| 46 | George C. Carpenter | Republican | 1906 | W. F. Ludemann | Democratic | 676 | 18.77 | Republican |
| 47 | John E. C. Robinson§ | Democratic | 1906 | John D. Sullivan | Democratic | 1,739 | 52.41 | Democratic |
| 47 | John E. C. Robinson§ | Democratic | 1906 | Arthur C. Cooper | Republican | 1,579 | 47.59 | Democratic |
| 48 | Solomon F. Alderman§ | Republican | 1906 | Charles D. Johnson | Democratic | 2,473 | 41.01 | Democratic |
| 48 | Solomon F. Alderman§ | Republican | 1906 | O. P. Erickson | Republican | 2,229 | 36.97 | Democratic |
| 48 | Solomon F. Alderman§ | Republican | 1906 | R. A. Henning | Public Ownership | 814 | 13.50 | Democratic |
| 48 | Solomon F. Alderman§ | Republican | 1906 | D. C. Henderson | Independent | 514 | 8.52 | Democratic |
| 49 | Patrick R. Vail§ | Republican | 1906 | James P. Boyle | Republican | 5,144 | 71.22 | Republican |
| 49 | Patrick R. Vail§ | Republican | 1906 | Bert N. Wheeler | Prohibition | 2,079 | 28.78 | Republican |
| 50 | Thomas M. Pugh | Republican | 1902 | Thomas M. Pugh | Republican | 1,649 | 62.49 | Republican |
| 50 | Thomas M. Pugh | Republican | 1902 | Ray E. Hunt | Prohibition | 990 | 37.51 | Republican |
| 51 | George R. Laybourn | Republican | 1902 | Henry W. Cheadle | Democratic | 2,154 | 51.72 | Democratic |
| 51 | George R. Laybourn | Republican | 1902 | George R. Laybourn | Republican | 2,011 | 48.28 | Democratic |
| 52 | Daniel M. Gunn | Republican | 1906 | Daniel M. Gunn | Republican | 4,607 | 58.13 | Republican |
| 52 | Daniel M. Gunn | Republican | 1906 | Charles D. Viebahn | Public Ownership | 3,318 | 41.87 | Republican |
| 53 | James Johnston | Republican | 1906 | James Johnston | Republican | 2,859 | 49.75 | Republican |
| 53 | James Johnston | Republican | 1906 | Levi M. Davis | Democratic | 2,135 | 37.15 | Republican |
| 53 | James Johnston | Republican | 1906 | George W. Cralle | Public Ownership | 753 | 13.10 | Republican |
| 54 | John J. Ahmann | Democratic | 1906 | John J. Ahmann | Democratic | 2,849 | 67.48 | Democratic |
| 54 | John J. Ahmann | Democratic | 1906 | Henry J. Emmel | Independent | 1,373 | 32.52 | Democratic |
| 55 | Lars O. Thrope‡ | Republican | 1894, 1902† | Charles W. Odell | Republican | 1,684 | 51.39 | Republican |
| 55 | Lars O. Thrope‡ | Republican | 1894, 1902† | Victor E. Lawson | Prohibition | 1,593 | 48.61 | Republican |
| 56 | Ray G. Farrington | Democratic | 1906 | Saxe J. Froshaug | Prohibition | 1,406 | 33.71 | Prohibition |
| 56 | Ray G. Farrington | Democratic | 1906 | Ray G. Farrington | Democratic | 1,385 | 32.21 | Prohibition |
| 56 | Ray G. Farrington | Democratic | 1906 | T. J. McElligott | Republican | 1,380 | 33.09 | Prohibition |
| 57 | Ole O. Canestorp‡ | Republican | 1890, 1906† | Edward Rustad | Republican | 3,120 | 100.00 | Republican |
| 58 | Claus J. Gunderson | Republican | 1906 | Claus J. Gunderson | Republican | 4,306 | 100.00 | Republican |
| 59 | Ole O. Sageng | People's | 1906 | Ole O. Sageng | People's | 3,694 | 74.58 | People's |
| 59 | Ole O. Sageng | People's | 1906 | Sam G. Wallace | Public Ownership | 1,259 | 25.42 | People's |
| 60 | Frank H. Peterson§ | Republican | 1902 | Charles S. Marden | Republican | 4,871 | 67.74 | Republican |
| 60 | Frank H. Peterson§ | Republican | 1902 | M. Kuhn | Democratic | 2,320 | 32.26 | Republican |
| 61 | Albert L. Hanson | Republican | 1906 | Albert L. Hanson | Republican | 6,041 | 63.29 | Republican |
| 61 | Albert L. Hanson | Republican | 1906 | Carl Geil | Public Ownership | 3,504 | 36.71 | Republican |
| 62 | Andrew D. Stephens | Republican | 1902 | Johannes Saugstad | Independent | 2,997 | 48.46 | Independent |
| 62 | Andrew D. Stephens | Republican | 1902 | Andrew D. Stephens | Republican | 2,773 | 44.84 | Independent |
| 62 | Andrew D. Stephens | Republican | 1902 | H. C. Larson | Public Ownership | 414 | 6.69 | Independent |
| 63 | Bengt E. Sundberg | Republican | 1902 | Bengt E. Sundberg | Republican | 4,522 | 100.00 | Republican |

*Elected in a special election.
†Elected to non-consecutive terms.
‡Retired; did not seek re-election.
§Lost primary election for party's nomination.

=== Seats changing parties ===
| Party | Incumbent | District | First elected | Winner | Party |
|---|---|---|---|---|---|
| Republican | George D. French | 2 | 1908* | M. J. McGrath | Democratic |
| Republican | Alex S. Campbell‡ | 6 | 1902 | Charles F. Cook | Democratic |
| Republican | Jonathan W. Wright | 23 | 1906 | Edward P. Peterson | Democratic |
| Republican | Solomon F. Alderman§ | 48 | 1906 | Charles D. Johnson | Democratic |
| Republican | George R. Laybourn | 51 | 1902 | Henry W. Cheadle | Democratic |
| Republican | Andrew D. Stephens | 62 | 1902 | Johannes Saugstad | Independent |
| Democratic | Horace H. Witherstine‡ | 4 | 1902 | Alonzo T. Stebbins | Republican |
| Democratic | Frederick E. DuToit‡ | 25 | 1898 | Charles H. Klein | Republican |
| Democratic | Ray G. Farrington | 56 | 1906 | Saxe J. Froshaug | Prohibition |

*Elected in a special election.
‡Retired; did not seek re-election.
§Lost primary election for party's nomination.

== See also ==
- Minnesota gubernatorial election, 1910
