= 1980 Minnesota House of Representatives election =

- November 4, 1980

All 134 seats in the Minnesota House of Representatives 68 seats needed for a majority
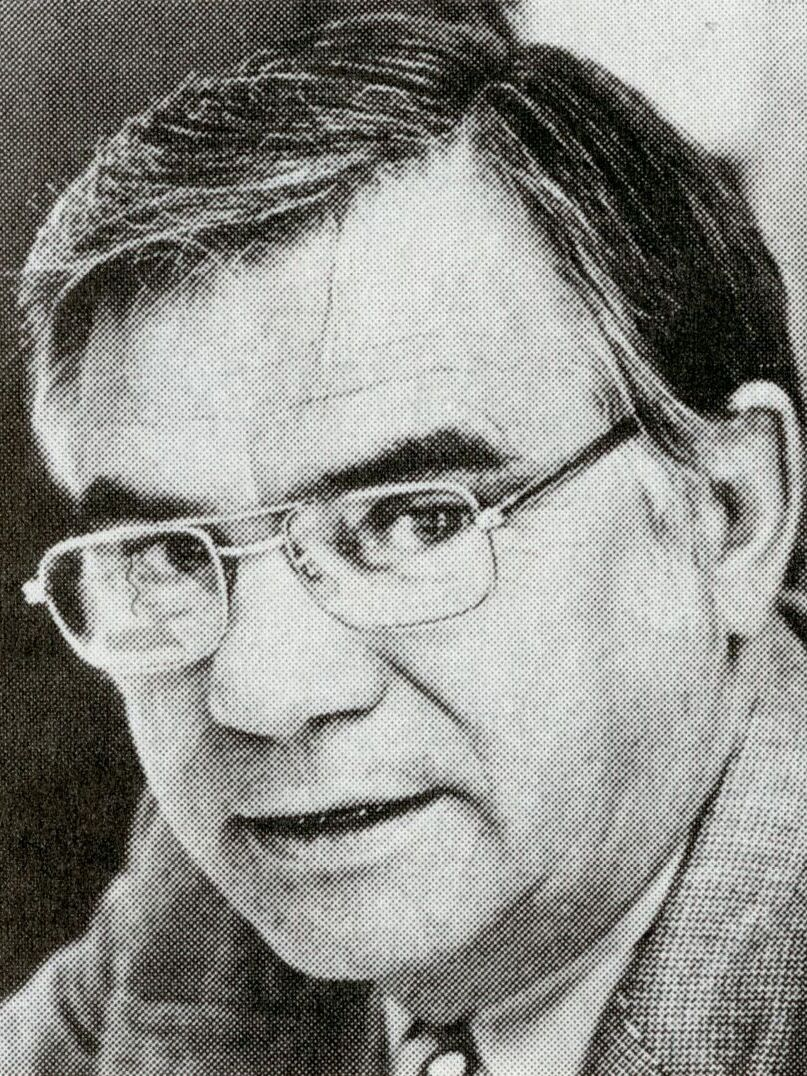

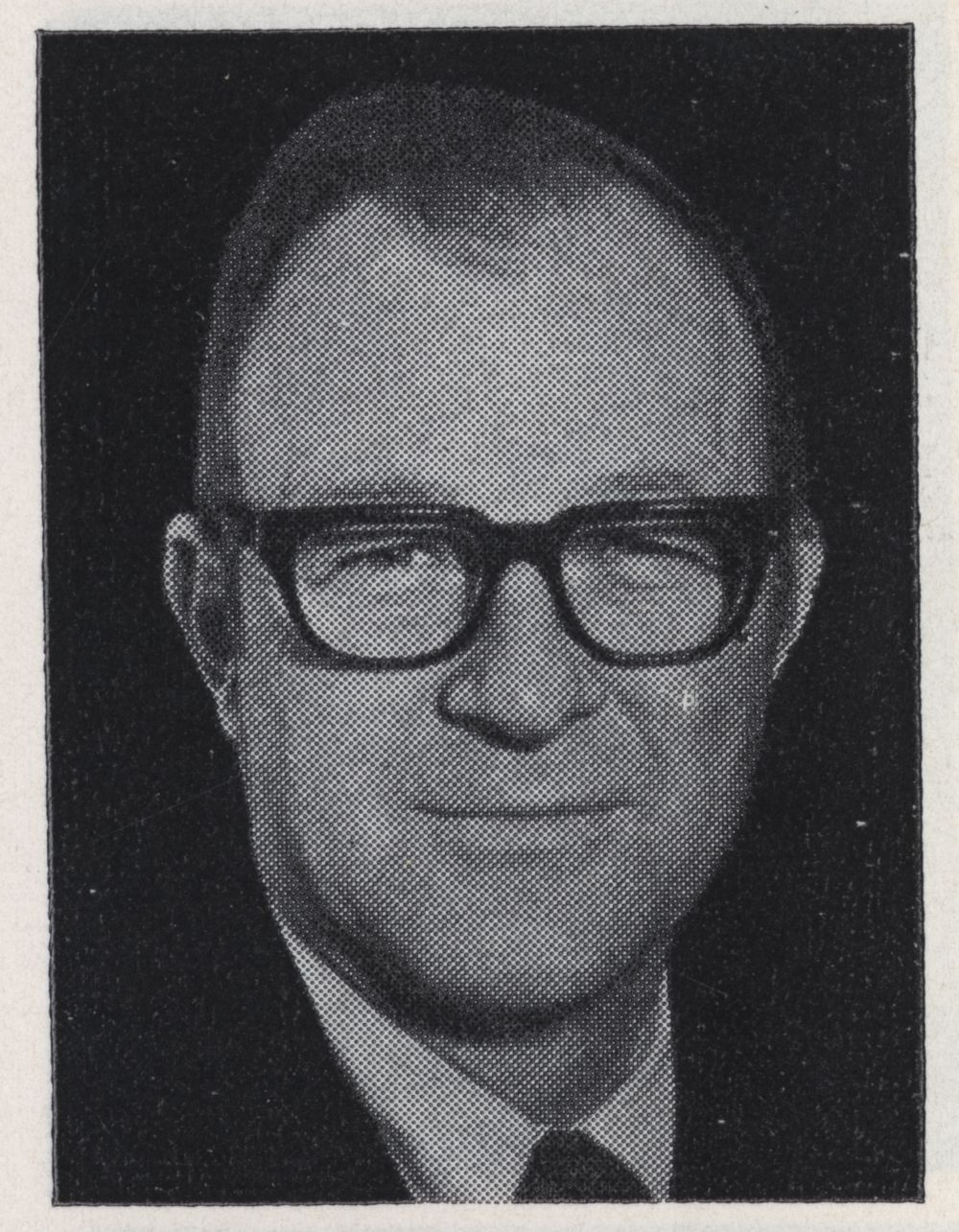
	Majority party	Minority party
Leader	Irv Anderson	Rod Searle (retired)
Party	Democratic (DFL)	Ind.-Republican
Leader since	1978	1978
Leader's seat	3A–International Falls	30B–Waseca
Last election	67 seats	67 seats
Seats before	68	66
Seats won	70	64
Seat change	▲2	▼2
Popular vote	900,218	924,863
Speaker before election
Fred Norton
Democratic (DFL)
Elected Speaker
Harry Sieben
Democratic (DFL)

The 1980 Minnesota House of Representatives election was held in the U.S. state of Minnesota on November 4, 1980, to elect members to the House of Representatives of the 72nd Minnesota Legislature. A primary election was held on September 9, 1980.

The Minnesota Democratic–Farmer–Labor Party (DFL) won a majority of seats, remaining the majority party, followed by the Independent-Republicans of Minnesota. The new Legislature convened on January 6, 1981.

== Background ==
The last election resulted in the DFL and Independent-Republicans winning an equal number of seats. Under an agreement reached between the two parties, the Republicans would be given the speakership, the chairs of the divisions of the appropriations and tax committees, and a one-vote majority on the divisions of the tax committee. The DFL would be given the chairs and a one-vote majority on the rules and tax committees as well as the chair of the appropriations committee. The chairs and membership of the remaining committees would be equally divided.

This arrangement would last until the end of the legislative session in May 1979, when the DFL obtained a majority after the House removed Republican member Bob Pavlak from office on a straight party-line vote, declaring that he violated the Minnesota Fair Campaign Practices Act and therefore was not legally elected. Pavlak was legally barred from casting their vote on matters relating to his contested election, allowing the motion to remove him to pass. Pavlak ran in the resulting special election for his former seat held on June 19, 1979, losing to DFL candidate Frank Rodriguez.

After obtaining a majority, the DFL caucus voted to support caucus leader Irv Anderson to be speaker. However, some DFL members who felt were punished by Anderson "for prior policy disagreements or for personal reasons by denying them the committee positions in 1979 that they had expected by virtue of experience and geography" were opposed to electing him speaker. A group of 26 DFL members, led by Gordon Voss and Fred Norton, formed a coalition with the Republicans, electing Norton speaker in 1980.

== Results ==
Summary of the November 4, 1980 Minnesota House of Representatives election results
Party	Candidates	Votes	Seats		
Party	Candidates	Votes	No.	∆No.	%
Minnesota Democratic–Farmer–Labor Party	122	900,218	70	▲2	52.24
Independent-Republicans of Minnesota	121	924,863	64	▼2	47.76
Independent	5	11,344	0	Steady	0.00
Write-in	1	1,841	0	Steady	0.00
Total			134	±0	100.00
Turnout (out of 2,882,406 eligible voters)	2,079,411	72.14%		▲14.19 pp	
Source: Minnesota Secretary of State, Minnesota Legislative Reference Library

== Aftermath ==
Although Irv Anderson was the leader of the DFL caucus, DFL representative Harry Sieben sought the support of the DFL caucus to be speaker. Believing that Anderson would have trouble leading a divided caucus following the election of Fred Norton as speaker, Sieben convinced Anderson to support him. Sieben and Norton tied on the first ballot, each receiving 35 votes. After two more ballots, Sieben won the unanimous support of the caucus.

== See also ==
- Minnesota Senate election, 1980
- Minnesota gubernatorial election, 1978

== Bibliography ==
- Hanson, Royce (1989). Tribune of the People: The Minnesota Legislature and Its Leadership. Minneapolis: University of Minnesota Press. ISBN 0816617902. OCLC 20012294.
