= 1984 Minnesota House of Representatives election =

- November 6, 1984

All 134 seats in the Minnesota House of Representatives 68 seats needed for a majority
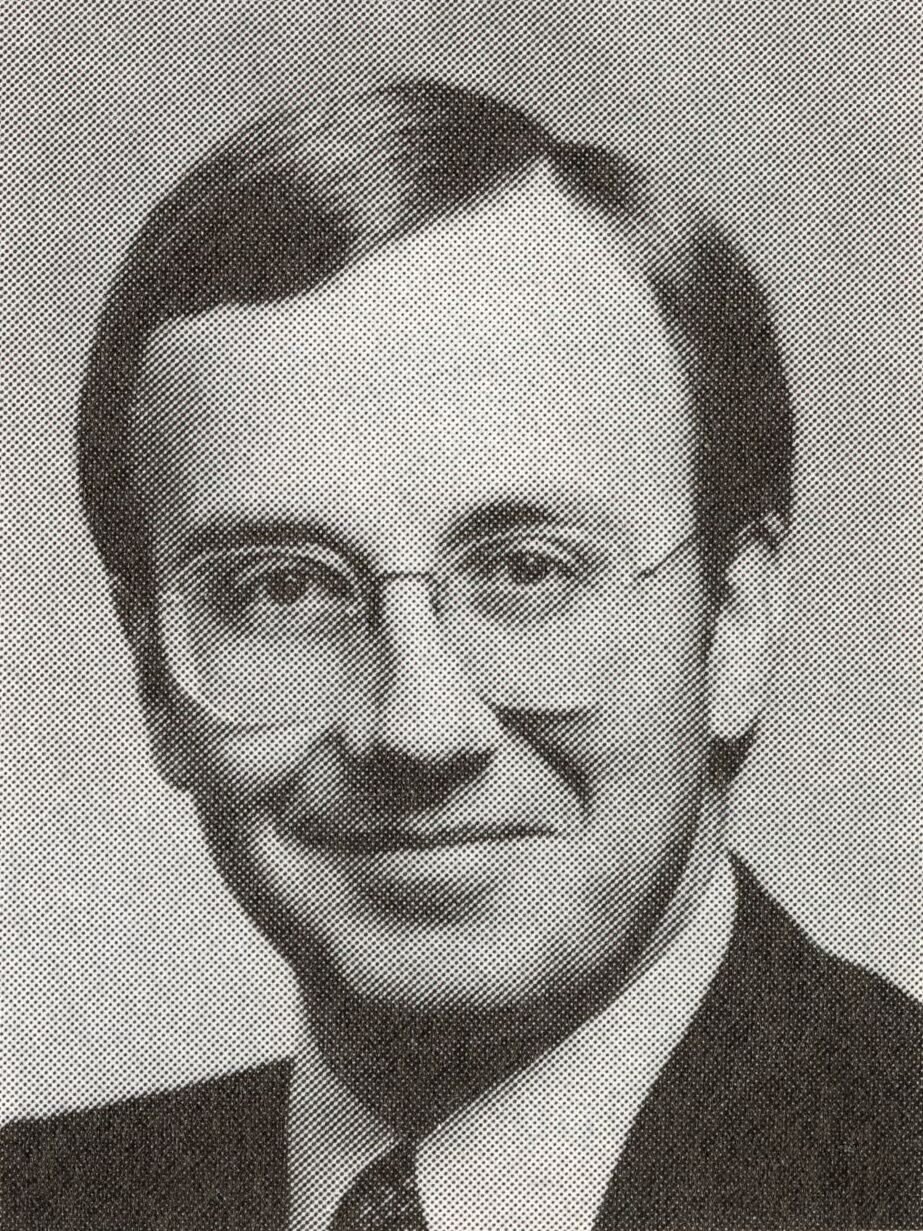

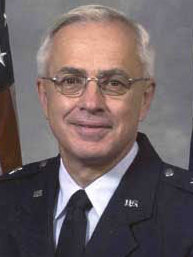
	Majority party	Minority party
Leader	David Jennings	Harry Sieben (retired)
Party	Ind.-Republican	Democratic (DFL)
Leader since	1982	1980
Leader's seat	29A–Truman	37B–Hastings
Last election	57 seats	77 seats
Seats before	58	76
Seats won	69	65
Seat change	▲11	▼11
Popular vote	948,280	981,512
Speaker before election
Harry Sieben
Democratic (DFL)
Elected Speaker
David Jennings
Ind.-Republican

The 1984 Minnesota House of Representatives election was held in the U.S. state of Minnesota on November 6, 1984, to elect members to the House of Representatives of the 74th Minnesota Legislature. A primary election was held on September 11, 1984.

The Independent-Republicans of Minnesota won a majority of seats, its first majority since the return of partisan elections to the House in 1974, defeating the majority of the Minnesota Democratic–Farmer–Labor Party (DFL). The new Legislature convened on January 8, 1985.

== Results ==
Summary of the November 6, 1984 Minnesota House of Representatives election results
Party	Candidates	Votes	Seats		
Party	Candidates	Votes	No.	∆No.	%
Independent-Republicans of Minnesota	130	948,280	69	▲11	51.49
Minnesota Democratic–Farmer–Labor Party	131	981,512	65	▼11	48.51
Total			134	±0	100.00
Turnout (out of 2,982,015 eligible voters)	2,115,317	70.94%		▲8.60 pp	
Source: Minnesota Secretary of State, Minnesota Legislative Reference Library

== See also ==
- Minnesota Senate election, 1982
- Minnesota gubernatorial election, 1982
