= Hoxsey =

Hoxsey may refer to:

- Hoxsey Therapy
- Archibald Hoxsey (1884–1910), American aviator
- Betty J. Hoxsey (1923-2011), American farmer and politician
