= 1986 Minnesota House of Representatives election =

- November 4, 1986

All 134 seats in the Minnesota House of Representatives 68 seats needed for a majority
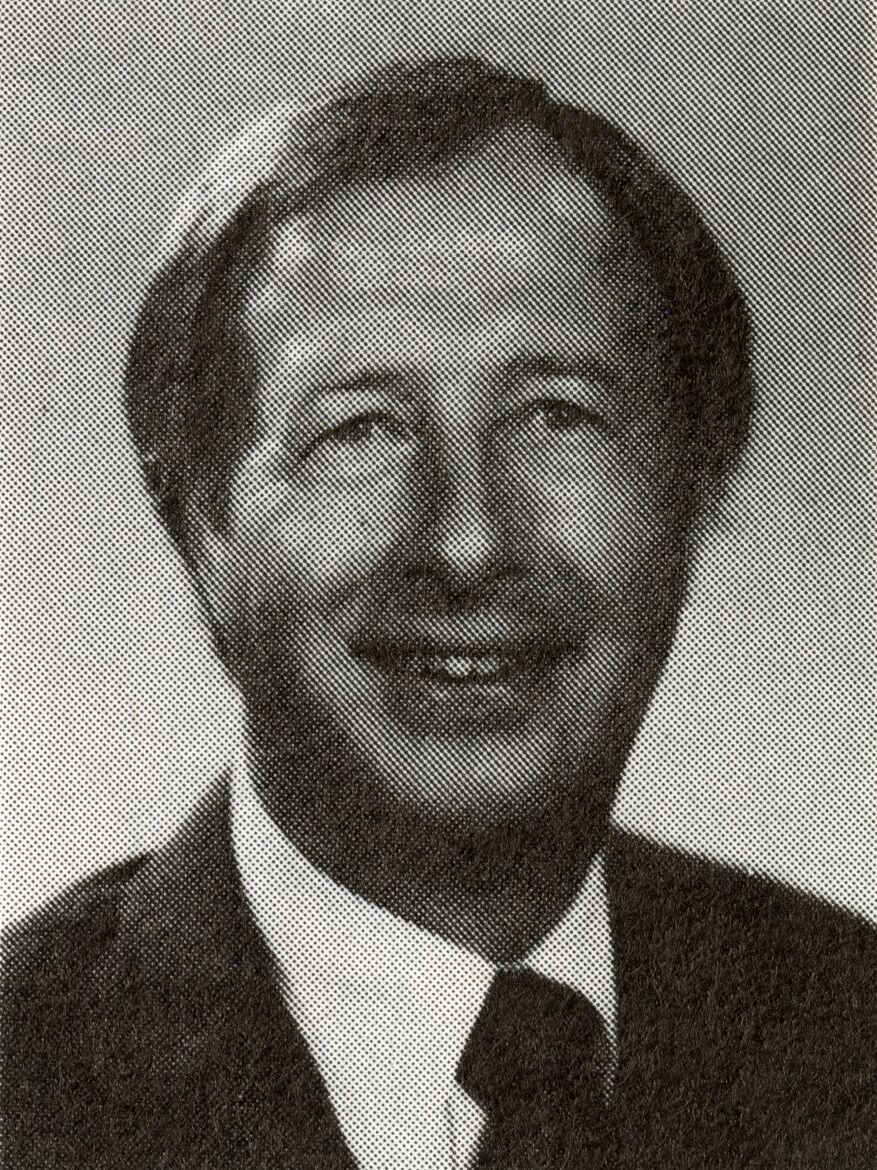

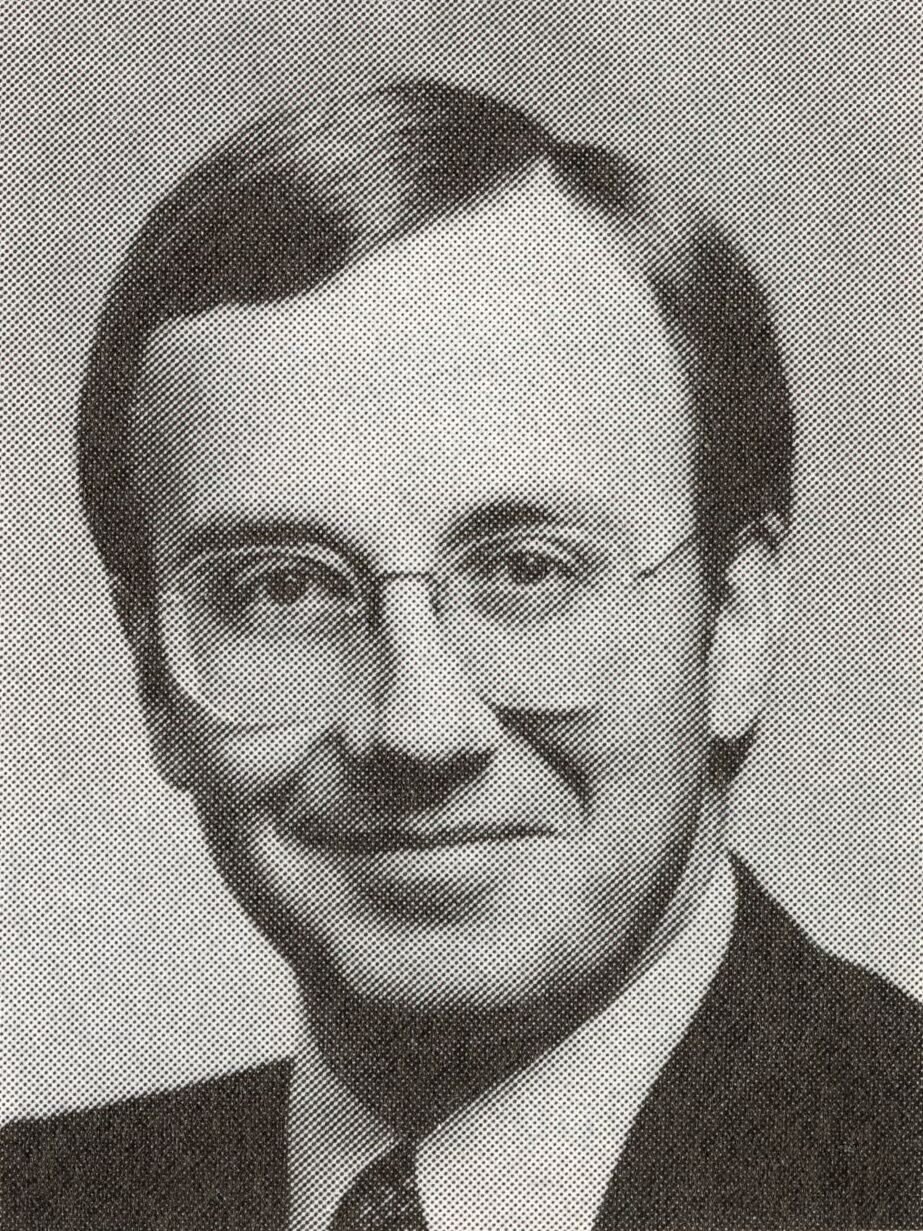
	Majority party	Minority party
Leader	Fred Norton	David Jennings (retired)
Party	Democratic (DFL)	Ind.-Republican
Leader since	1984	1982
Leader's seat	65A–Saint Paul	29A–Truman
Last election	65 seats	69 seats
Seats won	83	51
Seat change	▲18	▼18
Popular vote	733,773	612,218
Speaker before election
David Jennings
Ind.-Republican
Elected Speaker
Fred Norton
Democratic (DFL)

The 1986 Minnesota House of Representatives election was held in the U.S. state of Minnesota on November 4, 1986, to elect members to the House of Representatives of the 75th Minnesota Legislature. A primary election was held on September 9, 1986.

The Minnesota Democratic–Farmer–Labor Party (DFL) won a majority of seats, defeating the majority of the Independent-Republicans of Minnesota. The new Legislature convened on January 6, 1987.

== Results ==
Summary of the November 4, 1986 Minnesota House of Representatives election results
Party	Candidates	Votes	Seats		
Party	Candidates	Votes	No.	∆No.	%
Minnesota Democratic–Farmer–Labor Party	129	733,773	83	▲18	61.94
Independent-Republicans of Minnesota	127	612,218	51	▼18	38.06
Independent	N/A	1,836	0	Steady	0.00
Total			134	±0	100.00
Turnout (out of 3,024,070 eligible voters)	1,456,579	48.17%		▼22.77 pp	
Source: Minnesota Secretary of State, Minnesota Legislative Reference Library

== See also ==
- Minnesota Senate election, 1986
- Minnesota gubernatorial election, 1986
