= 1978 Minnesota House of Representatives election =

- November 7, 1978

All 134 seats in the Minnesota House of Representatives 68 seats needed for a majority
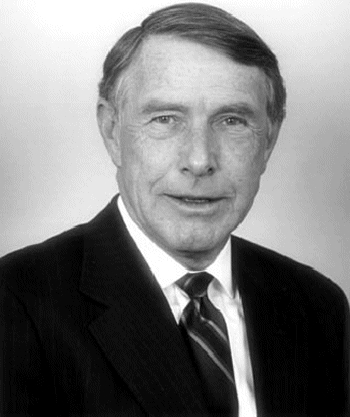
	Majority party	Minority party
		I-R
Leader	Martin Olav Sabo (retired)	Henry Savelkoul (retired)
Party	Democratic (DFL)	Ind.-Republican
Leader since	1968	1974
Leader's seat	57B–Minneapolis	31A–Albert Lea
Last election	104 seats	30 seats
Seats before	99	35
Seats won	67	67
Seat change	▼32	▲32
Popular vote	732,019	717,820
Speaker before election
Martin Olav Sabo
Democratic (DFL)
Elected Speaker
Rod Searle
Ind.-Republican

The 1978 Minnesota House of Representatives election was held in the U.S. state of Minnesota on November 7, 1978, to elect members to the House of Representatives of the 71st Minnesota Legislature. A primary election was held on September 12, 1978.

The Minnesota Democratic–Farmer–Labor Party (DFL) and Independent-Republicans of Minnesota won an equal number of seats. The new Legislature convened on January 3, 1979.

== Results ==
Summary of the November 7, 1978 Minnesota House of Representatives election results
Party	Candidates	Votes	Seats		
Party	Candidates	Votes	No.	∆No.	%
Minnesota Democratic–Farmer–Labor Party	127	732,019	67	▼32	50.00
Independent-Republicans of Minnesota	120	717,820	67	▲32	50.00
American Party of Minnesota	13	12,153	0	Steady	0.00
Libertarian Party of Minnesota	1	452	0	Steady	0.00
Independent	3	4,415	0	Steady	0.00
Write-in	2	4,518	0	Steady	0.00
Total			134	±0	100.00
Turnout (out of 2,804,000 eligible voters)	1,624,911	57.95%		▼15.06 pp	
Source: Minnesota Secretary of State, Minnesota Legislative Reference Library

== Aftermath ==
As a result of the House being equally divided, under an agreement reached between the two parties, the Independent-Republicans would be given the speakership, the chairs of the divisions of the appropriations and tax committees, and a one-vote majority on the divisions of the tax committee. The DFL would be given the chairs and a one-vote majority on the rules and tax committees as well as the chair of the appropriations committee. The chairs and membership of the remaining committees would be equally divided.

== See also ==
- Minnesota Senate election, 1976
- Minnesota gubernatorial election, 1978

== Bibliography ==
- Hanson, Royce (1989). Tribune of the People: The Minnesota Legislature and Its Leadership. Minneapolis: University of Minnesota Press. ISBN 0816617902. OCLC 20012294.
