= 1982 Minnesota House of Representatives election =

- November 2, 1982

All 134 seats in the Minnesota House of Representatives 68 seats needed for a majority
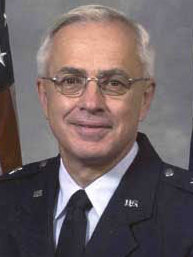

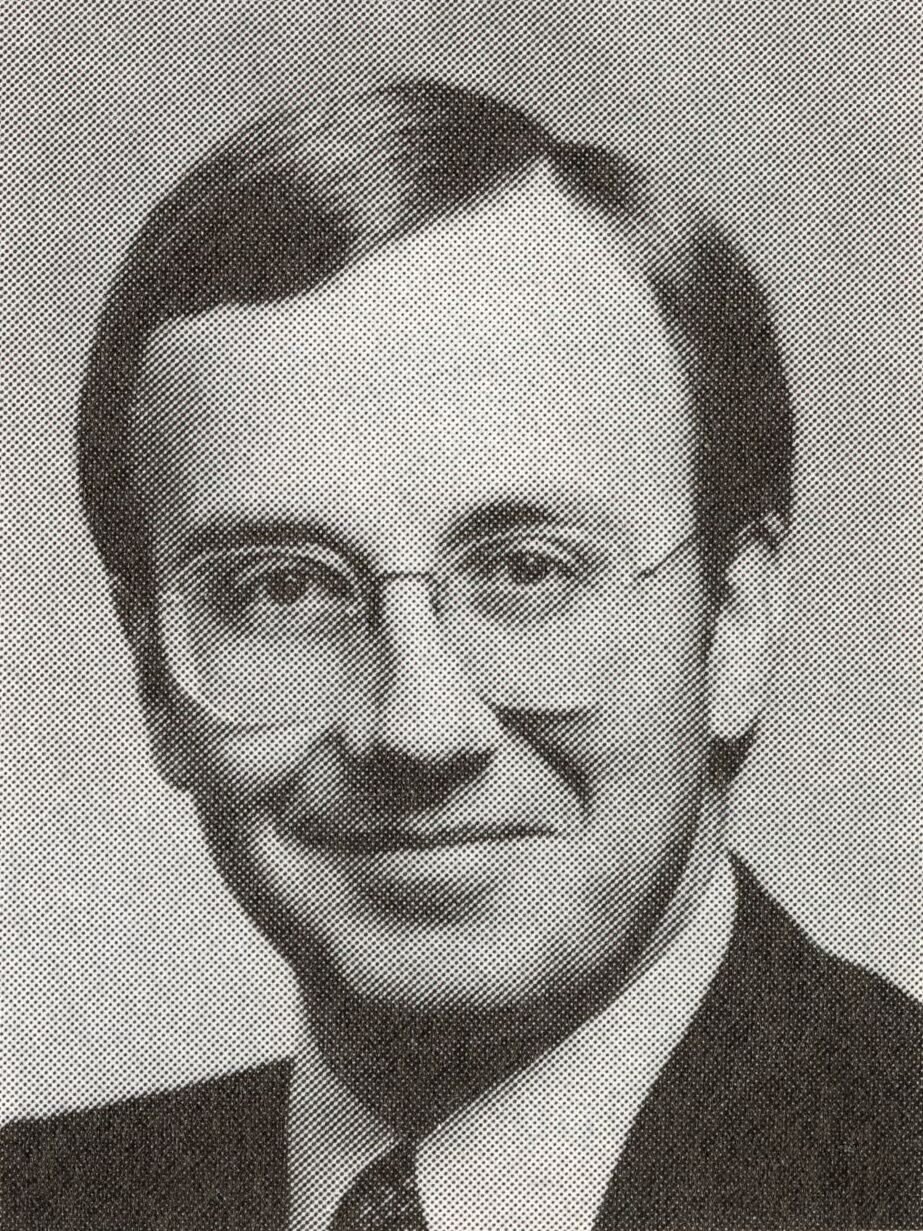
	Majority party	Minority party
Leader	Harry Sieben	David Jennings
Party	Democratic (DFL)	Ind.-Republican
Leader since	1980	1982
Leader's seat	37B–Hastings	29A–Truman
Last election	70 seats	64 seats
Seats won	77	57
Seat change	▲7	▼7
Popular vote	935,668	766,143
Speaker before election
Harry Sieben
Democratic (DFL)
Elected Speaker
Harry Sieben
Democratic (DFL)

The 1982 Minnesota House of Representatives election was held in the U.S. state of Minnesota on November 2, 1982, to elect members to the House of Representatives of the 73rd Minnesota Legislature. A primary election was held on September 14, 1982.

The Minnesota Democratic–Farmer–Labor Party (DFL) won a majority of seats, remaining the majority party, followed by the Independent-Republicans of Minnesota. The new Legislature convened on January 4, 1983.

== Results ==
Summary of the November 2, 1982 Minnesota House of Representatives election results
Party	Candidates	Votes	Seats		
Party	Candidates	Votes	No.	∆No.	%
Minnesota Democratic–Farmer–Labor Party	134	935,668	77	▲7	57.46
Independent-Republicans of Minnesota	123	766,143	57	▼7	42.54
Independent	N/A	5,618	0	Steady	0.00
Write-in	N/A	3,542	0	Steady	0.00
Total			134	±0	100.00
Turnout (out of 2,943,169 eligible voters)	1,834,737	62.34%		▼9.80 pp	
Source: Minnesota Secretary of State, Minnesota Legislative Reference Library

== See also ==
- Minnesota Senate election, 1982
- Minnesota gubernatorial election, 1982
