= 1910 Minnesota House of Representatives election =

- November 8, 1910

All 120 seats in the Minnesota House of Representatives 61 seats needed for a majority
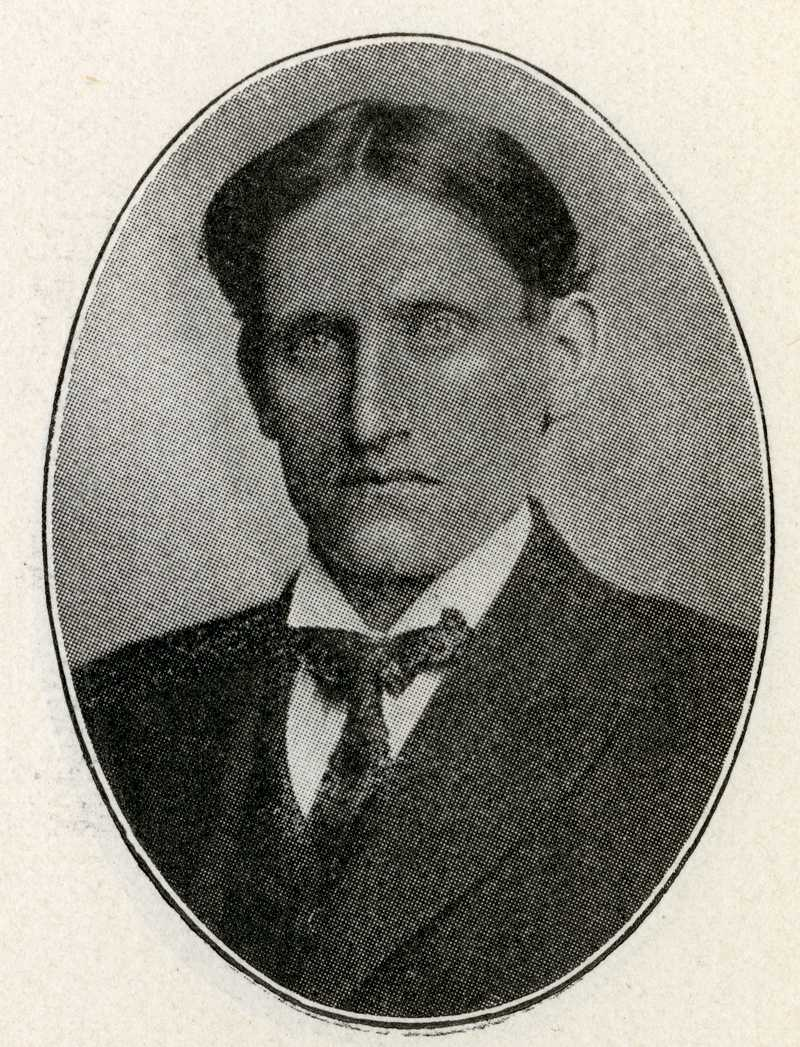
	Majority party	Minority party	Third party
		DEM	PRO
Leader	Anton J. Rockne (retired) (Note: Ran for State Senate.)	Thomas J. Brady (lost renomination)
Party	Republican	Democratic	Prohibition
Leader since	January 3, 1905	January 5, 1909
Leader's seat	29th–Zumbrota	34th–St. Paul
Seats won	88	26	4
Popular vote	242,406	95,848	45,352
Percentage	59.7%	23.6%	11.2%
	Fourth party
	PUB
Party	Public Ownership
Seats won	1
Popular vote	17,157
Percentage	4.2%
- Districts are shaded according to popular vote percentage Dots indicate the elected representatives

The 1910 Minnesota House of Representatives election was held in the U.S. state of Minnesota on November 8, 1910, to elect members to the House of the 37th Minnesota Legislature.

The Minnesota Republican Party won a large majority of seats, followed by the Minnesota Democratic Party, the Prohibition Party, and the Public Ownership Party. The new Legislature convened on January 3, 1911.

In 1910, the Minnesota House of Representatives was elected in a mixture of single-member and multi-member districts with election being determined by plurality.

== Results ==
Summary of the November 8, 1910 Minnesota House of Representatives election results
Party	Candidates	Votes	Seats	
Party	Candidates	Votes	No.	%
Republican Party	119	242,406	88	59.68
Democratic Party	66	95,848	26	23.60
Prohibition Party	49	45,352	4	11.17
Public Ownership Party	21	17,157	1	4.22
Independent	7	5,447	1	1.34
Total		406,210	120	100.00
Source: Minnesota Secretary of State

== See also ==
- 1910 Minnesota gubernatorial election
- 1910 Minnesota Senate election
