= Leland, Illinois =

- Village
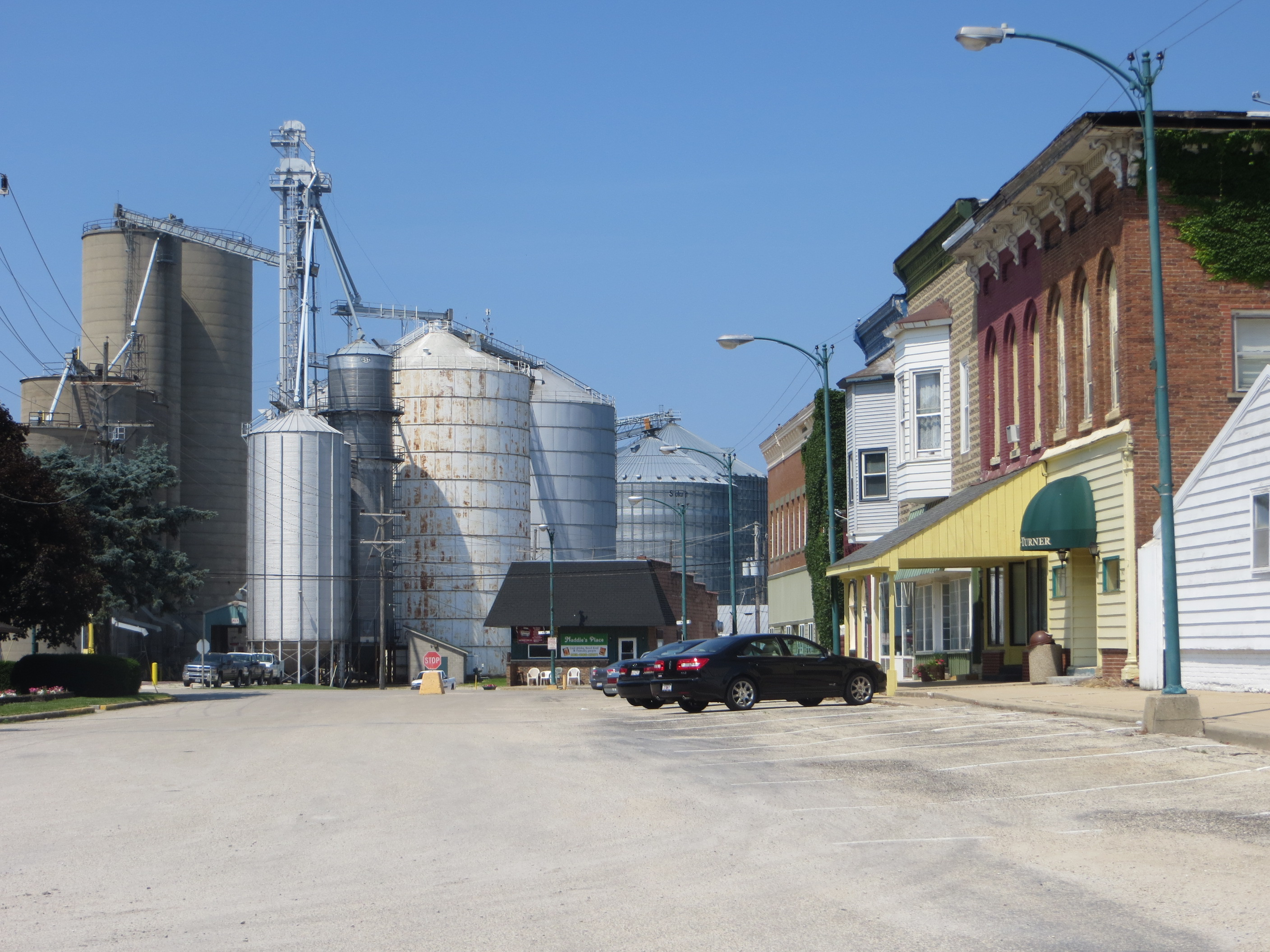
- Railroad Avenue
- Motto: A great place to grow
- Location in LaSalle County, Illinois
- Coordinates: 41°36′57″N 88°47′54″W
- Country: United States
- State: Illinois
- County: LaSalle
- Township: Adams
- Incorporated: 1859
- Named for: John Leland Adams

Government
  - Mayor: Taunya Eckman

Area
  - Total: 0.53 sq mi (1.38 km^{2})
  - Land: 0.53 sq mi (1.38 km^{2})
  - Water: 0 sq mi (0.00 km^{2})
- Elevation: 699 ft (213 m)

Population (2020)
  - Total: 951
  - Density: 1,781.6/sq mi (687.89/km^{2})
- Time zone: UTC-6 (CST)
  - Summer (DST): UTC-5 (CDT)
- ZIP Code(s): 60531
- Area code: 815
- FIPS code: 17-42756
- GNIS feature ID: 2398416
- Website: villageofleland.org

Leland is a village in LaSalle County, Illinois, United States. The population was 951 at the 2020 census. It is part of the Ottawa Micropolitan Statistical Area.

== History ==
A post office called Leland has been in operation since 1857. The village was named for John Leland Adams, the Postmaster.

== Geography ==
Leland is in northeastern LaSalle County, 10 miles (16 km) southwest of Sandwich, 20 miles (32 km) northeast of Mendota, and 20 miles north of Ottawa.

According to the 2021 census gazetteer files, Leland has a total area of 0.53 square miles (1.37 km^{2}), all land.

== Demographics ==
Historical population
| Census | Pop. | Note | %± |
|---|---|---|---|
| 1880 | 653 | | — |
| 1890 | 554 | | −15.2% |
| 1900 | 634 | | 14.4% |
| 1910 | 545 | | −14.0% |
| 1920 | 588 | | 7.9% |
| 1930 | 548 | | −6.8% |
| 1940 | 583 | | 6.4% |
| 1950 | 537 | | −7.9% |
| 1960 | 642 | | 19.6% |
| 1970 | 743 | | 15.7% |
| 1980 | 775 | | 4.3% |
| 1990 | 862 | | 11.2% |
| 2000 | 970 | | 12.5% |
| 2010 | 977 | | 0.7% |
| 2020 | 951 | | −2.7% |
U.S. Decennial Census

As of the 2020 census there were 951 people, 405 households, and 267 families residing in the village. The population density was 1,780.90 inhabitants per square mile (687.61/km^{2}). There were 391 housing units at an average density of 732.21 per square mile (282.71/km^{2}). The racial makeup of the village was 89.59% White, 0.11% African American, 0.11% Native American, 0.42% Asian, 3.15% from other races, and 6.62% from two or more races. Hispanic or Latino of any race were 7.99% of the population.

There were 405 households, out of which 26.9% had children under the age of 18 living with them, 48.64% were married couples living together, 11.11% had a female householder with no husband present, and 34.07% were non-families. 29.38% of all households were made up of individuals, and 9.38% had someone living alone who was 65 years of age or older. The average household size was 2.85 and the average family size was 2.30.

The village's age distribution consisted of 22.7% under the age of 18, 4.8% from 18 to 24, 28% from 25 to 44, 28.7% from 45 to 64, and 15.7% who were 65 years of age or older. The median age was 40.9 years. For every 100 females, there were 88.3 males. For every 100 females age 18 and over, there were 77.8 males.

The median income for a household in the village was $60,197, and the median income for a family was $69,083. Males had a median income of $56,250 versus $25,000 for females. The per capita income for the village was $26,783. About 4.9% of families and 9.4% of the population were below the poverty line, including 12.3% of those under age 18 and 0.0% of those age 65 or over.

== Notable people ==
- Manley L. Fosseen, lawyer and politician, was born in Leland.
- Betty J. Hoxsey, farmer and politician, was born in Leland.
