= Albert Schaller =

American judge

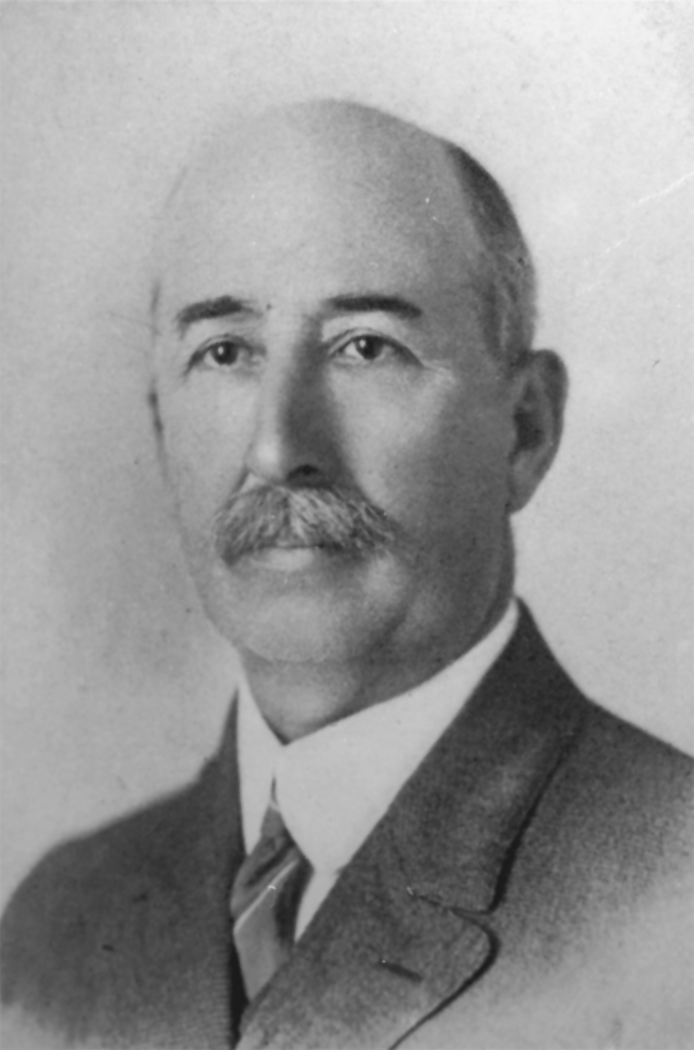
- Albert Schaller

Associate Justice of the Minnesota Supreme Court
- In office March 1915 – January 1917

Member of the Minnesota State Senate
- In office 1895–1915

Personal details
- Born: May 20, 1857 Long Grove, Illinois, U.S.
- Died: March 31, 1934 (aged 76) Hastings, Minnesota, U.S.
- Resting place: Guardian Angels Cemetery, Hastings
- Party: Democratic
- Spouse: Katherine Elizabeth Meloy
- Children: 5
- Education: St. Vincent's Seminary (Missouri); Washington University in St. Louis
- Profession: Jurist, politician, businessman

Albert Schaller (May 20, 1857 – March 31, 1934) was an American jurist, politician, and businessman.

Born in Long Grove, Illinois, The Schaller family moved to Hastings Minnesota on July 4 of that year. Schaller attended secondary school in France. Schaller received his bachelor's degree from St. Vincent's College in Cape Girardeau, Missouri and his law degree from Washington University School of Law in 1879. Schaller practiced law in Hastings, Minnesota and was the Hastings City Attorney and the city attorney for South St. Paul, Minnesota. He married Katherine Elizabeth (Kate) Meloy of Hastings and they had five children; four lived to adulthood – Rosemarie, Karl, Marion, and Josephine. He was also county attorney for Dakota County, Minnesota. Schaller served in the Minnesota State Senate from 1895 to 1915 and was a Democrat. In March 1915, Schaller was appointed to the Minnesota Supreme Court and served until January 1917. Schaller resumed his law practice in Saint Paul, Minnesota and Hastings, Minnesota. Schaller died in Hastings, Minnesota and is buried in the family plot in Guardian Angels Cemetery in Hastings.
