= 1980 Minnesota Senate election =

Minnesota Senate election, 1980
- November 4, 1980

All 67 seats in the Minnesota Senate 34 seats needed for a majority
| | Majority party | Minority party |
|---|---|---|
| Leader | Nick Coleman | Bob Ashbach |
| Party | Democratic (DFL) | Ind.-Republican |
| Leader since | 1970 | 1975 |
| Leader's seat | 65th–Saint Paul (retired) | 48th–Saint Paul |
| Last election | 49 seats | 18 seats |
| Seats before | 45 | 22 |
| Seats won | 45 | 22 |
| Seat change | Steady | Steady |
| Popular vote | 1,024,624 | 823,711 |
Majority Leader before election
Nick Coleman
Democratic (DFL)
Elected Majority Leader
Roger Moe
Democratic (DFL)

The 1980 Minnesota Senate election was held in the U.S. state of Minnesota on November 4, 1980, to elect members to the Senate of the 72nd Minnesota Legislature. A primary election was held on September 9, 1980.

The Minnesota Democratic–Farmer–Labor Party (DFL) won a majority of seats, remaining the majority party, followed by the Independent-Republicans of Minnesota. The new Legislature convened on January 6, 1981.

== Results ==
Summary of the November 4, 1980 Minnesota Senate election results
| Party | Candidates | Votes | Seats | | |
| Party | Candidates | Votes | No. | ∆No. | % |
|---|---|---|---|---|---|
| Minnesota Democratic–Farmer–Labor Party | 67 | 1,024,624 | 45 | Steady | 67.16 |
| Independent-Republicans of Minnesota | 60 | 823,711 | 22 | Steady | 32.84 |
| Independent | 2 | 8,876 | 0 | Steady | 0.00 |
| Total | | | 67 | ±0 | 100.00 |
| Turnout (out of 2,882,406 eligible voters) | 2,079,411 | 72.14% | | ▼0.87 pp | |
Source: Minnesota Secretary of State, Minnesota Legislative Reference Library

== See also ==
- Minnesota House of Representatives election, 1980
- Minnesota gubernatorial election, 1978
