= Axel H. Reed =

US Union Army captain

Captain Axel Hayford Reed
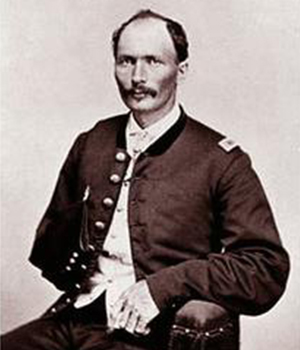
- Born: 13 March 1831; Hartford, Maine, US
- Died: 21 January 1917 (aged 85); Glencoe, Minnesota, US
- Burial place: Glencoe City Cemetery
- Military career
- Allegiance: United States (Union)
- Branch: Union Army
- Service years: 1861–1865
- Rank: Captain
- Units: Company K, 2nd Minnesota Infantry Regiment
- Conflicts: American Civil War: Battle of Chickamauga; Battle of Missionary Ridge
- Awards: Medal of Honor
- Other work: Merchant, Farmer

Axel Hayford Reed (13 March 1835 – 21 January 1917) was a captain in the United States Army who was awarded the Medal of Honor for gallantry during the American Civil War. During the battles at Chickamauga, Georgia and Missionary Ridge, Tennessee on 19 September and 15 November 1863, respectively, Reed voluntarily left his position in the rear of the army to engage the Confederates. He was later severely wounded while leading a charge against Confederate positions.

== Personal life ==
=== Early life ===
Reed was born on 13 March 1835 in Hartford, Maine, to parents Sampson Reed and Huldah Bisbee Reed, the youngest of seven children. His mother died when he was 7. He stayed on his father's farm until the age of 19, when he left for Minnesota. After working for several years at a brickmaker's in Glencoe, Minnesota, he was able to invest all of his savings into 160 acres (65 ha) of land.

=== After the war ===
After the end of the Civil War, Reed married Nettie Hannah Morrison in 1869 and fathered four children: Cora Lydia Reed (1871-1936), Nellie A. Reed (1873-1875), Axel H. Reed (1876-1937), and Frank E. Reed (1880-1967). He bought a mercantile and traded commodities. He also helped bring the first railroads to McLeod County and helped establish the First National Bank of Glencoe. He was also involved in the political affairs of Glencoe and McLeod County, serving as a representative to the Minnesota Legislature. Axel H. Reed died on 21 January 1917 in Glencoe, Minnesota, and is buried in the Glencoe City Cemetery or the Mount Auburn Cemetery in Glencoe.

== Military service ==
Reed entered service on 16 August 1861 and served with Company K of the 2nd Minnesota Infantry Regiment. During the battles at Chickamauga, Georgia and Missionary Ridge, Tennessee on 19 September and 15 November 1863, respectively, Reed, then a Sergeant, voluntarily left his position in the rear of the army, where he had been arrested and interned for criticizing military food through the Nashville Union newspaper, to engage the Confederates with a rifle. After his lieutenant was wounded he took charge of his company. He was personally released from arrest by General George Henry Thomas after the end of the battle. He later lost an arm while leading a charge against Confederate positions, but refused to accept a discharge from the army and fought to stay in active service until the end of the war. For these actions, he was awarded the Medal of Honor on 2 April 1898. He was promoted to the rank of second lieutenant on 17 August 1864 and first lieutenant on 18 February 1865. He was mustered out of service at Fort Snelling on 18 July 1865.

After the war, he was elected as a veteran companion of the Military Order of the Loyal Legion of the United States.

His Medal of Honor citation reads,

While in arrest at Chickamagua, Ga., left his place in the rear and voluntarily went to the line of battle, secured a rifle, and fought gallantly during the two-day battle; was released from arrest in recognition of his bravery. At Missionary Ridge Reed commanded his company and gallantly led it, being among the first to enter the enemy's works; was severely wounded, losing an arm, but declined a discharge and remained in active service to the end of the war.

— R. A. Alger, Secretary of War
