= Betty J. Hoxsey =

American politician

Betty June (née Whittaker) Hoxsey Justus (May 23, 1923 – August 11, 2011) was an American farmer and politician.

Born in Leland, Illinois, Hoxsey graduated from Ottawa Township High School and then farmed in Serena Township, LaSalle County, Illinois. Hoxsey served in the Illinois House of Representatives from 1977 to 1982 and was a Republican. After the passage of the Cutback Amendment, Hoxsey chose to run for the Illinois Senate. Democratic candidate Patrick Welch defeated Hoxsey in the 1982 general election. She died in Peru, Illinois.
