= 1890 Minnesota Senate election =

- November 4, 1890

All 54 seats in the Minnesota Senate 28 seats needed for a majority
	Majority party	Minority party	Third party
	GOP	DEM	ALL
Party	Republican	Democratic	Alliance
Seats won	26	15	13

The 1890 Minnesota Senate election was held in the U.S. state of Minnesota on November 4, 1890, to elect members to the Senate of the 27th and 28th Minnesota Legislatures.

The Minnesota Republican Party won a plurality of seats, followed by the Minnesota Democratic Party and the Minnesota Farmers' Alliance. The new Legislature convened on January 6, 1891.

The election resulted in Republicans losing control of the Senate for the first time since 1858 when Minnesota was granted statehood.

== Background ==
In the late 1800s, Minnesota was one of the nation's most consistently Republican states, and conservative dominance extended to the State Senate as well. Since 1860, Republicans were the preeminent caucus in the Senate, not once losing a majority in the chamber.

That being said, in the years leading up to 1890, Minnesota had emerged as a center of the Farmers' Alliance, a progressive agrarian movement. At the 1886 election, two members of the Alliance had taken seats from the Republicans, foreshadowing the 1890 result.

It was not uncommon for local Alliance organizations to endorse members of the two major parties if their values were aligned, though it was more likely for Alliance groups to endorse known Democrats than Republicans. The same is true of the Prohibition Party and other groups.

In St. Paul, a group of 100 local power brokers, 50 from either major party, assembled in August 1890 with the intention of nominating a "Citizens' Ticket" for Ramsey County. The "committee of 100" hoped that local Democratic and Republican organizations would endorse their unity ticket, which they did in most cases.

In western Minnesota, two candidates were endorsed as the "Peoples'" candidates. It is unclear if these endorsements were related as part of a broader organization or if the "Peoples'" designation was only of local significance.

Three Republicans who lost their party's endorsement ran as Independent Republicans and won, then caucused as Republicans in the Senate. Two Democrats, one endorsed and one unendorsed, ran in the 36th District of Scott County. The endorsed candidate, James McHale, won.

Prior to the 1890 election, the Minnesota Senate had 47 seats. A redistricting undertaken in 1889 added 7 seats, bringing the total to 54. In particular, Hennepin and Ramsey Counties as well as western and northern Minnesota gained new seats. Goodhue County lost a seat.

== Results ==
=== Summary ===
Republicans won 26 seats, two short of the 28 needed to control the chamber. The Democratic Party and Farmers' Alliance won a combined 28 seats.

Due to the fact that numerous candidates were endorsed by more than one party, it is impossible to calculate how many people voted for each party without counting votes multiple times. It can be said, however, that Republicans had certainly not won such a small percentage of the vote since Minnesota had been granted statehood.

=== District results ===
The parties are as follows: Alliance (All.), Citizen's Ticket (Cit.), Democratic (Dem.), Independent (Ind.), Labor (Lab.), People's Ticket (Peo.), Prohibition (Pro.), Republican (Rep.)

Dis.	Incumbent			Candidates							
Dis.	Name	Party	First elected	Name	Endorsements				Votes	%	Winner Party
Dis.	Name	Party	First elected	Name	All.	Dem.	Rep.	Other			
1	Tosten Johnson	Rep.	1886	James C. Kelly		✓			1,263	42.54	Dem.
1	Tosten Johnson	Rep.	1886	Tosten Johnson			✓		1,232	41.50	Dem.
1	Tosten Johnson	Rep.	1886	John Pendergast	✓				474	15.97	Dem.
2	Charles G. Edwards‡	Rep.	1876, 1886†	Evin D. Hammer			✓		2,351	54.25	Rep.
2	Charles G. Edwards‡	Rep.	1876, 1886†	Theodore Tousley	✓	✓ (Note: The Democratic Party initially endorsed the Alliance ticket when the nominee for state senator was Daniel Currie. Currie then fell into ill health just days before the election and resigned from the ticket."Locals". The Mable Enterprise. October 30, 1890. The Democratic Party did not reconvene with enough time to nominate their own candidate or endorse Tousley.)			1,983	45.75	Rep.
3	Otis W. Gibson	Dem.	1886	Oscar Ayers			✓		1,725	50.31	Rep.
3	Otis W. Gibson	Dem.	1886	Otis W. Gibson	✓	✓			1,704	49.69	Rep.
4	Marcellus Halvorson§	Rep.	1886	H. C. Nelson	✓	✓			1,639	52.26	All.
4	Marcellus Halvorson§	Rep.	1886	Thorvald V. Knatvold			✓		1,497	47.74	All.
5	Vacant (Note: Previously held by Republican Daniel F. Goodrich, who died in 1889."Goodrich, Daniel F. "D.F." - Legislator Record - Minnesota Legislators Past & Present". www.lrl.mn.gov.)	N/A	N/A	Jacob Armel Kiester			✓		1,893	67.83	Rep.
5	Vacant	N/A	N/A	Charles S. Dunbar	✓				744	26.66	Rep.
5	Vacant	N/A	N/A	George E. Francisco				Pro.	113	4.05	Rep.
5	Vacant	N/A	N/A	David H. Morse		✓			41	1.47	Rep.
6	Frank Arah Day	Rep.	1886	Frank Arah Day			✓		1,776	58.44	Rep.
6	Frank Arah Day	Rep.	1886	James E. Grogan	✓	✓			1,224	40.28	Rep.
6	Frank Arah Day	Rep.	1886	James D. McBroom				Pro.	39	1.28	Rep.
7	Warrington B. Brown¶	Rep.	1886	Jay LaDue	✓				2,342	48.94	All.
7	Warrington B. Brown¶	Rep.	1886	Herbert J. Miller			✓		1,871	39.10	All.
7	Warrington B. Brown¶	Rep.	1886	A. M. Becker		✓			572	11.95	All.
8	John Clark‡	Rep.	1886	Eric Sevatson	✓		✓ (Note: Both Sevatson and Knox claimed to have rightfully earned the Republican nomination. Cottonwood County Republicans endorsed Sevatson and Jackson County Republicans endorsed Knox before the legislative district convention. At that convention, shenanigans ensued, which left neither without the legitimate endorsement of the whole district.)		1,666	62.07	All.
8	John Clark‡	Rep.	1886	T. J. Knox			✓ (Note: Both Sevatson and Knox claimed to have rightfully earned the Republican nomination. Cottonwood County Republicans endorsed Sevatson and Jackson County Republicans endorsed Knox before the legislative district convention. At that convention, shenanigans ensued, which left neither without the legitimate endorsement of the whole district.)		715	26.64	All.
8	John Clark‡	Rep.	1886	W. F. Portman		✓			278	10.36	All.
8	John Clark‡	Rep.	1886	John I. Wallace				Pro.	25	0.09	All.
9	Thomas Evans Bowen‡	Dem.	1886	Samuel D. Peterson			✓		2,198	45.35	Rep.
9	Thomas Evans Bowen‡	Dem.	1886	Andrew D. Stewart	✓				1,378	28.43	Rep.
9	Thomas Evans Bowen‡	Dem.	1886	W. E. Baker		✓			1,271	26.22	Rep.
10	Edmund Mann Pope§	Dem.	1886	George T. Barr			✓		2,832	51.21	Rep.
10	Edmund Mann Pope§	Dem.	1886	Albert R. Pfau	✓	✓			2,698	48.79	Rep.
11	William G. Ward¶	Rep.	1872, 1886†	Robert O. Craig	✓	✓			1,292	51.56	Dem.
11	William G. Ward¶	Rep.	1872, 1886†	Cristoph Wagner			✓		1,214	48.44	Dem.
12	Charles Schretz Crandall	Rep.	1886	Charles Schretz Crandall			✓		1,285	49.31	Rep.
12	Charles Schretz Crandall	Rep.	1886	E. M. Morehouse		✓			1,253	48.08	Rep.
12	Charles Schretz Crandall	Rep.	1886	D. J. Ames				Pro.	68	2.61	Rep.
13	E. N. Dodge‡	Rep.	1886	Jeremiah Grinnell			✓		1,091	50.18	Rep.
13	E. N. Dodge‡	Rep.	1886	William H. Edison	✓				969	44.57	Rep.
13	E. N. Dodge‡	Rep.	1886	A. R. Cohoon				Pro.	114	5.24	Rep.
14	Milton J. Daniels‡	Rep.	1886	William Worrall Mayo	✓	✓			2,131	51.46	Dem.
14	Milton J. Daniels‡	Rep.	1886	Alonzo Thomas Stebbins			✓		1,956	47.24	Dem.
14	Milton J. Daniels‡	Rep.	1886	D. D. Kimball				Pro.	52	1.26	Dem.
14	Milton J. Daniels‡	Rep.	1886	P. H. Marsh					2	0.05	Dem.
15	Thomas Taylor Hayden¶	Dem.	1886	James Albertus Tawney			✓		3,156	53.30	Rep.
15	Thomas Taylor Hayden¶	Dem.	1886	John Ludwig		✓			2,765	46.70	Rep.
16	Ole Olson Lende¶	Rep.	1886	Orrin Mott	✓				1,556	35.49	All.
16	Ole Olson Lende¶	Rep.	1886	Hans Lavesson			✓		1,338	30.52	All.
16	Ole Olson Lende¶	Rep.	1886	Henry M. Burchard					1,301	29.68	All.
16	Ole Olson Lende¶	Rep.	1886	G. I. Larson				Pro.	189	4.31	All.
17	Gideon Sprague Ives‡ (Note: Ran successfully for Lieutenant Governor.)	Rep.	1886	Charles Russell Davis			✓		1,407	55.72	Rep.
17	Gideon Sprague Ives‡	Rep.	1886	H. C. Randall	✓	✓			1,118	44.28	Rep.
18	Thomas Welch¶	Dem.	1882	Theodore G. Streissguth			✓		1,251	42.81	Rep.
18	Thomas Welch¶	Dem.	1882	Patrick Bray		✓			1,091	37.34	Rep.
18	Thomas Welch¶	Dem.	1882	J. A. Solomonson	✓				580	19.85	Rep.
19	C. U. Chapman¶	Rep.	1886	Edson R. Smith			✓		1,814	44.56	Rep.
19	C. U. Chapman¶	Rep.	1886	Dennis Doyle		✓			1,675	41.15	Rep.
19	C. U. Chapman¶	Rep.	1886	John Byrnes	✓				500	12.28	Rep.
19	C. U. Chapman¶	Rep.	1886	Alex Kenrick				Pro.	82	2.01	Rep.
20	George Weston Wood¶	Rep.	1886	Albert William Stockton			✓		2,011	44.66	Rep.
20	George Weston Wood¶	Rep.	1886	S. L. Crocker		✓			1,761	39.11	Rep.
20	George Weston Wood¶	Rep.	1886	Timothy O'Grady	✓				576	12.79	Rep.
20	George Weston Wood¶	Rep.	1886	Royal Plummer				Pro.	155	3.44	Rep.
21	Anders K. Finseth§	Rep.	1874, 1886†	John W. Peterson			✓		2,078	41.27	Rep.
21	Anders K. Finseth§	Rep.	1874, 1886†	Peter Nelson (Note: Nelson represented Senate District 22 from 1887-1891, which covered the north half of Goodhue County. During redistricting, Nelson was placed in Senate District 21, which now covered all of Goodhue County. Thus, while Nelson was an incumbent Senator in 1890, he represented a constituency that did not exist for the 1890 election.)		✓			2,043	40.58	Rep.
21	Anders K. Finseth§	Rep.	1874, 1886†	A. T. Conley	✓			Pro.	912	18.11	Rep.
21	Anders K. Finseth§	Rep.	1874, 1886†	T. Wilson					2	0.04	Rep.
22	Henry Burkhardt	Rep.	1886	Henry Burkhardt			✓		1,776	50.40	Rep.
22	Henry Burkhardt	Rep.	1886	E. D. Southard		✓			1,674	47.50	Rep.
22	Henry Burkhardt	Rep.	1886	George B. Albertson				Pro.	74	2.10	Rep.
23	Edward White Durant§	Dem.	1886	Jasper N. Searles			✓		2,115	46.25	Rep. (Note: This result was contested in January 1891 in the opening days of the newly convened legislature. The originally certified results counted Republican Jasper N. Searles as the winner by 104 votes, but after a tabulation discrepancy was discovered in Marine Township, Democrat James S. O'Brien was awarded the seat by the Senate's vote of 32 to 21 on January 29, 1891.)
23	Edward White Durant§	Dem.	1886	James S. O'Brien		✓			2,011	43.98	Rep.
23	Edward White Durant§	Dem.	1886	Andrew Richmond	✓				447	9.78	Rep.
24	Albert H. Truax	Rep.	1882	Ignatius L. Donnelly	✓				1,647	41.37	All.
24	Albert H. Truax	Rep.	1882	R. C. Libbey		✓			1,305	32.78	All.
24	Albert H. Truax	Rep.	1882	William Hodgson			✓		951	23.89	All.
24	Albert H. Truax	Rep.	1882	C. M. Nichols				Pro.	78	1.96	All.
25	New constituency	N/A	N/A	John Benjamin Sanborn		✓	✓	Cit.	5,103	90.51	Rep.
25	New constituency	N/A	N/A	John Lindstrom				Pro.	535	9.49	Rep.
26	New constituency	N/A	N/A	Charles H. Lienau		✓		Cit.	4,471	100.00	Dem.
27	New constituency	N/A	N/A	William Blake Dean		✓	✓	Cit.	4,283	100.00	Rep.
28	New constituency	N/A	N/A	Hiram Fairchild Stevens			✓		2,327	49.31	Rep.
28	New constituency	N/A	N/A	Charles H. Benedict		✓		Cit.	2,243	47.53	Rep.
28	New constituency	N/A	N/A	John W. Rhines				Pro.	149	3.16	Rep.
29	New constituency	N/A	N/A	Samuel A. March		✓			4,062	83.94	Dem.
29	New constituency	N/A	N/A	Thomas H. Lucas	✓				512	10.58	Dem.
29	New constituency	N/A	N/A	Washington S. Cilley				Pro.	265	5.48	Dem.
30	New constituency	N/A	N/A	Frank G. McMillan		✓			1,784	52.59	Dem.
30	New constituency	N/A	N/A	Edward M. Johnson			✓		1,223	36.06	Dem.
30	New constituency	N/A	N/A	William B. Hammond	✓				244	7.19	Dem.
30	New constituency	N/A	N/A	Charles M. Way				Pro.	141	4.16	Dem.
31	New constituency	N/A	N/A	Frank L. Morse		✓			2,835	50.02	Dem.
31	New constituency	N/A	N/A	Albert J. Boardman			✓		2,573	45.40	Dem.
31	New constituency	N/A	N/A	George R. Whitcomb				Pro.	260	4.59	Dem.
32	New constituency	N/A	N/A	Alonzo Phillips		✓			3,722	55.46	Dem.
32	New constituency	N/A	N/A	J. A. Wolverton			✓		2,399	35.75	Dem.
32	New constituency	N/A	N/A	Michael W. Morgan	✓				318	4.74	Dem.
32	New constituency	N/A	N/A	W. M. Lawrence				Pro.	272	4.05	Dem.
33	New constituency	N/A	N/A	John W. Bell		✓			2,992	56.81	Dem.
33	New constituency	N/A	N/A	Sever Ellingson			✓		1,806	34.29	Dem.
33	New constituency	N/A	N/A	Edwin B. Miller	✓				469	8.90	Dem.
34	New constituency	N/A	N/A	John Day Smith			✓		2,062	49.18	Rep.
34	New constituency	N/A	N/A	Elbridge S. Barnes		✓			1,933	46.10	Rep.
34	New constituency	N/A	N/A	Herman W. Knapp				Pro.	198	4.72	Rep.
35	David Marston Clough‡ (Note: Ran unsuccessfully for Lieutenant Governor.)	Rep.	1886	Christopher S. Guderian			✓		1,693	53.95	Rep.
35	David Marston Clough‡	Rep.	1886	E. L. Reed		✓		Pro.	1,416	45.12	Rep.
35	David Marston Clough‡	Rep.	1886	Edward L. Curial					15	0.48	Rep.
35	David Marston Clough‡	Rep.	1886	J. W. Steed					14	0.45	Rep.
36	Mathias Nachbar§	Dem.	1886	James H. McHale		✓			1,797	63.39	Dem.
36	Mathias Nachbar§	Dem.	1886	Mathias Nachbar					1,038	36.61	Dem.
37	Andrew G. Anderson‡ (Note: Unsuccessfully sought the Democratic nomination for Minnesota Secretary of State.)	Dem.	1886	Joseph W. Craven	✓	✓			1,955	61.83	Dem.
37	Andrew G. Anderson‡	Dem.	1886	Charles G. Halgren			✓		1,207	38.17	Dem.
38	Alcinus Young Eaton§	Rep.	1886	Alcinus Young Eaton	✓			Peo.	3,044	51.95	Rep.
38	Alcinus Young Eaton§	Rep.	1886	William H. Houlton			✓		2,482	42.36	Rep.
38	Alcinus Young Eaton§	Rep.	1886	D. Murdock				Pro.	333	5.68	Rep.
39	John S. Shields¶	All.	1886	Silas W. Leavitt	✓	✓			1,566	52.45	Dem.
39	John S. Shields¶	All.	1886	Peter E. Hanson			✓		1,334	44.68	Dem.
39	John S. Shields¶	All.	1886	S. S. Squire				Pro.	86	2.88	Dem.
40	Elisha Adrian Child¶	Dem.	1886	Samuel P. Brown		✓			1,636	54.52	Dem.
40	Elisha Adrian Child¶	Dem.	1886	Axel Hayford Reed			✓		930	30.99	Dem.
40	Elisha Adrian Child¶	Dem.	1886	C. N. Perkins	✓				370	12.33	Dem.
40	Elisha Adrian Child¶	Dem.	1886	B. M. Record				Pro.	65	2.17	Dem.
41	Marcus Johnson¶	Rep.	1886	Gustavus A. Glader		✓		Peo.	1,228	46.46	Rep.
41	Marcus Johnson¶	Rep.	1886	Nels Quam	✓		✓		1,204	45.55	Rep.
41	Marcus Johnson¶	Rep.	1886	Charles E. Johnson				Pro.	211	7.98	Rep.
42	Darwin Scott Hall¶	Rep.	1886	Ferdinand Borchert	✓	✓			1,423	45.07	All.
42	Darwin Scott Hall¶	Rep.	1886	J. T. Brooks			✓		1,289	40.83	All.
42	Darwin Scott Hall¶	Rep.	1886	Peter F. Walstrom					376	11.91	All.
42	Darwin Scott Hall¶	Rep.	1886	Morris Bishop Foster					69	2.19	All.
43	Hiram Eugene Hoard¶	Rep.	1886	Erick O. Erickson	✓	✓			3,479	64.59	All.
43	Hiram Eugene Hoard¶	Rep.	1886	Myron F. Barber			✓		1,907	35.41	All.
44	Otto Alexander Bernhard Wallmark¶	Rep.	1886	William S. Dedon	✓	✓			1,636	51.79	All.
44	Otto Alexander Bernhard Wallmark¶	Rep.	1886	Levi H. McKusick			✓		1,523	48.21	All.
45	Henry Keller	Dem.	1886	Henry Keller		✓			4,213	57.09	Dem.
45	Henry Keller	Dem.	1886	Charles A. Gilman			(Note: Gilman was a well-known Republican and was only not endorsed as their candidate because he missed the legislative convention."Of Affairs Political". Duluth Evening Herald. October 23, 1890.)		2,173	29.45	Dem.
45	Henry Keller	Dem.	1886	J. L. Robbins	✓				993	13.46	Dem.
46	Clarence Bennett Buckman¶	Rep.	1882	George Geissel		✓			5,167	72.25	Dem.
46	Clarence Bennett Buckman¶	Rep.	1882	James C. Flynn			✓		1,985	27.75	Dem.
47	George W. Thacker¶	All.	1886	Herman A. Grafe	✓				2,606	80.71	All.
47	George W. Thacker¶	All.	1886	Hill H. Wilson			✓		623	19.29	All.
47	George W. Thacker¶	All.	1886	G. A. Kortsch		✓			N/A (Note: For an unknown reason, Kortsch's vote total is not recorded by the 1891 Minnesota Legislative Manual. Presumably, the vote total is recorded in a yet-to-be-archived contemporary newspaper.)	N/A	All.
48	James Compton¶	Rep.	1882	John B. Hompe	✓	✓		Pro.	3,865	66.76	All.
48	James Compton¶	Rep.	1882	F. M. Mosher			✓		1,924	33.24	All.
49	Daniel W. Hixon	Rep.	1886	Ole O. Canestorp					2,298	43.80	Rep.
49	Daniel W. Hixon	Rep.	1886	Daniel W. Hixon	✓		✓		1,764	33.62	Rep.
49	Daniel W. Hixon	Rep.	1886	Louis Peterson		✓			1,095	20.87	Rep.
49	Daniel W. Hixon	Rep.	1886	Archibald A. Stone				Pro.	90	1.72	Rep.
50	Elon G. Holmes	Rep.	1888*	Randolph Michael Probstfield	✓	✓			2,812	54.92	All.
50	Elon G. Holmes	Rep.	1888*	Elon G. Holmes			✓		2,308	45.08	All.
51	Bernard Sampson¶	Rep.	1886	Edwin E. Lommen	✓				4,790	62.79	All.
51	Bernard Sampson¶	Rep.	1886	John Cromb			✓		1,443	18.91	All.
51	Bernard Sampson¶	Rep.	1886	Alexander McKinnon		✓			1,396	18.30	All.
52	New Constituency	N/A	N/A	Lorenzo G. Wood	✓				1,984	64.10	All.
52	New Constituency	N/A	N/A	Hans O. Hanson			✓		1,111	35.90	All.
53	New Constituency	N/A	N/A	William Prescott Allen			✓		2,226	52.02	Rep.
53	New Constituency	N/A	N/A	H. H. Hawkins	✓	✓			2,053	47.98	Rep.
54	Alonzo Jay Whiteman‡ (Note: Ran unsuccessfully for the United States House)	Dem.	1886	Frank B. Daugherty			✓		3,572	44.72	Rep.
54	Alonzo Jay Whiteman‡	Dem.	1886	Charles P. Maginnis		✓		Lab.	2,903	36.35	Rep.
54	Alonzo Jay Whiteman‡	Dem.	1886	Joseph A. Mannheim	✓				1,512	18.93	Rep.

* Elected in a special election.
† Elected to non-consecutive terms.
‡ Retired; did not seek re-election.
§ Lost primary election for party's nomination.
¶ Unclear why this senator was not a candidate for the general election

== Aftermath ==
When the new legislature met in January 1891, a flurry of activity and political dealmaking led to a strange arrangement of power in St. Paul. The 1891 session opened by Republican Lieutenant Governor Gideon Ives, and was swiftly moved to recess for three hours. In this time, Ignatius Donnelly organized the Democratic and Alliance members into a caucus (known as the "Combine") with him as its leader. To the great surprise of Republicans, the caucus was able to topple all their nominations for officers of the Senate.

By custom, Lieutenant Governor Ives would each day pass the president's gavel to Republican Senator John B. Sanborn to serve as president pro tempore (i.e., temporary) of the Senate. The Combine never elected a president of their own, making Sanborn the de facto president of the Senate until the start of the 1895 session.

The result in the 23rd District of Washington County was contested in late January 1891. The originally certified results counted Republican Jasper N. Searles as the winner by 4 votes, but after a tabulation discrepancy was discovered in Marine Township, Democrat James S. O'Brien was awarded the seat by the Senate's vote of 32 to 21 on January 29, 1891. This expanded the Combine's majority to 29 over the Republicans' 25 seats.

== See also ==
- Minnesota gubernatorial election, 1890
