= Edward Rustad =

American politician

Edward Rustad (November 26, 1867 – November 25, 1936) was a member of the Minnesota Senate.

== Biography ==
Rustad was born on November 26, 1867, in Columbia County, Wisconsin. He moved to Traverse County, Minnesota, in 1880 and attended the University of Minnesota Law School. Rustad died in 1936 in Painesville, Ohio.

== Career ==
Rustad was a member of the Senate from the 57th district from 1911 to 1914. From 1915 to 1918, he represented the 48th district. In addition, Rustad was auditor and attorney of Traverse County, as well as president and member of the council of Wheaton, Minnesota. He was a Republican. He also practiced law and was president of the Wheaton Bank.
