= Manley L. Fosseen =

American politician

Manley Lewis Fosseen (December 10, 1869 – August 9, 1947) was an American lawyer and politician.

Fosseen was born in Leland, LaSalle County, Illinois and went to the Illinois public schools. He went to Dixon College in Dixon, Illinois, the Minneapolis Academy and then received his law degree from the University of Minnesota Law School in 1895. He lived in Minneapolis, Minnesota with his wife and family and practiced law in Minneapolis. Fosseen served in the Minnesota House of Representatives from 1903 to 1906 and in the Minnesota Senate from 1907 to 1914. He was a Republican.
