= 1976 Minnesota House of Representatives election =

- November 2, 1976

All 134 seats in the Minnesota House of Representatives 68 seats needed for a majority
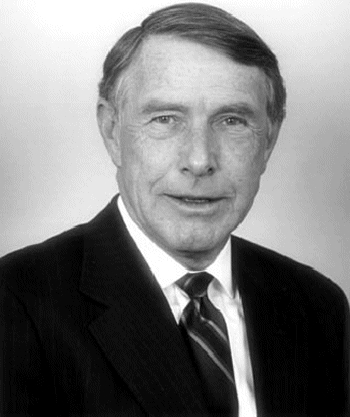
	Majority party	Minority party
		I-R
Leader	Martin Olav Sabo	Henry Savelkoul
Party	Democratic (DFL)	Ind.-Republican
Leader since	1968	1974
Leader's seat	57B–Minneapolis	31A–Albert Lea
Last election	104 seats	30 seats
Seats before	103	31
Seats won	104	30
Seat change	▲1	▼1
Popular vote	1,073,268	716,014
Speaker before election
Martin Olav Sabo
Democratic (DFL)
Elected Speaker
Martin Olav Sabo
Democratic (DFL)

The 1976 Minnesota House of Representatives election was held in the U.S. state of Minnesota on November 2, 1976, to elect members to the House of Representatives of the 70th Minnesota Legislature. A primary election was held on September 14, 1976.

The Minnesota Democratic–Farmer–Labor Party (DFL) won a majority of seats, remaining the majority party, followed by the Independent-Republicans of Minnesota. The new Legislature convened on January 4, 1977.

The Republican Party of Minnesota had changed its name to the Independent-Republican Party of Minnesota November 15, 1975.

== Results ==
Summary of the November 2, 1976 Minnesota House of Representatives election results
Party	Candidates	Votes	Seats		
Party	Candidates	Votes	No.	∆No.	%
Minnesota Democratic–Farmer–Labor Party	131	1,073,268	104	▲1	77.61
Independent-Republicans of Minnesota	123	716,014	30	▼1	22.39
American Party of Minnesota	1	1,376	0	Steady	0.00
Libertarian Party of Minnesota	3	1,061	0	Steady	0.00
Independent	6	8,380	0	Steady	0.00
Total			134	±0	100.00
Turnout (out of 2,710,000 eligible voters)	1,978,590	73.01%		▲23.48 pp	
Source: Minnesota Secretary of State, Minnesota Legislative Reference Library

== See also ==
- Minnesota Senate election, 1976
- Minnesota gubernatorial election, 1974
