= James D. Denegre =

American politician (1868–1926)

Member of the Minnesota Senate from the 40th district
- In office January 5, 1915 – December 30, 1926

Member of the Minnesota Senate from the 36th district
- In office January 3, 1911 – January 4, 1915

Personal details
- Born: James Denis Denegre; May 5, 1868 New Orleans, Louisiana, U.S.
- Died: December 30, 1926 (aged 58) Ramsey County, Minnesota, U.S.
- Party: Republican
- Education: Phillips Exeter Academy; Princeton University (AM); University of Minnesota Law School
- Profession: Politician, lawyer

James Denis Denegre (May 5, 1868 – December 30, 1926) was an American lawyer and politician.

Denegre was born in New Orleans, Louisiana. He graduated from Phillips Exeter Academy in 1885 and from Princeton University in 1889. He received his law degree from the University of Minnesota Law School in 1889. Denegre was admitted to the Minnesota bar. He lived with his wife and family in Saint Paul, Minnesota, and practiced law in Saint Paul, Minnesota. Denegre served in the Minnesota Senate from 1911 until his death in 1926. He was a Republican.
