= 1976 Minnesota Senate election =

Minnesota Senate election, 1976
- November 2, 1976

All 67 seats in the Minnesota Senate 34 seats needed for a majority

	Majority party	Minority party
Leader	Nick Coleman	Bob Ashbach
Party	Democratic (DFL)	Ind.-Republican
Leader since	1970	1975
Leader's seat	65th–Saint Paul	48th–Saint Paul
Seats won	49	18
Popular vote	1,027,602	721,637
Percentage	57.33%	40.26%
Majority Leader before election
Nick Coleman
Democratic (DFL)
Elected Majority Leader
Nick Coleman
Democratic (DFL)

The 1976 Minnesota Senate election was held in the U.S. state of Minnesota on November 2, 1976, to elect members to the Senate of the 70th and 71st Minnesota Legislatures. A primary election was held on September 14, 1976. This was the first partisan election of the Senate since 1910.

The Minnesota Democratic–Farmer–Labor Party (DFL) won a majority of seats, followed by the Independent-Republicans of Minnesota. The new Legislature convened on January 4, 1977.

The Republican Party of Minnesota had changed its name to the Independent-Republican Party of Minnesota on November 15, 1975.

== Results ==
Summary of the November 2, 1976 Minnesota Senate election results
Party	Candidates	Votes	Seats	
Party	Candidates	Votes	No.	%
Minnesota Democratic–Farmer–Labor Party	65	1,027,602	49	73.13
Independent-Republicans of Minnesota	61	721,637	18	26.87
American Party of Minnesota	2	5,963	0	0.00
Socialist Workers Party of Minnesota	3	1,680	0	0.00
Freedom Party	1	1,085	0	0.00
Libertarian Party of Minnesota	2	922	0	0.00
Independent	7	33,661	0	0.00
Total	141	1,792,550	67	100.00
Turnout (out of 2,710,000 eligible voters)	1,978,590	73.01%	▲2.70 pp	
Source: Minnesota Secretary of State

== See also ==
- Minnesota House of Representatives election, 1976
- Minnesota gubernatorial election, 1974
