= Fred Norton =

American politician

Fred C. Norton
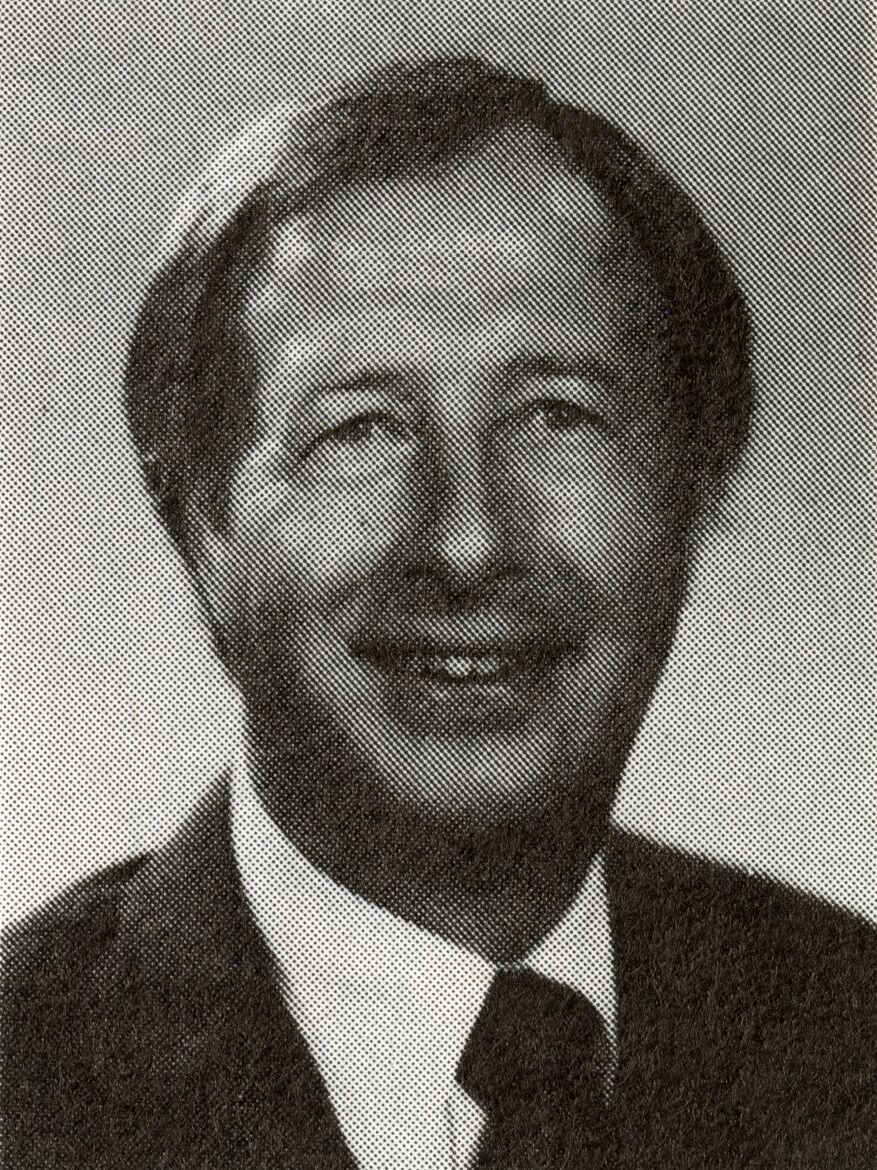

Associate Judge of the Minnesota Court of Appeals
- In office 1987–1997
- Appointed by: Rudy Perpich
- Preceded by: David R. Leslie
- Succeeded by: G. Barry Anderson

48th Speaker of the Minnesota House of Representatives
- In office 1980–1981
- Preceded by: Rod Searle
- Succeeded by: Harry A. Sieben, Jr.

51st Speaker of the Minnesota House of Representatives
- In office January 1987 – June 1987
- Preceded by: David M. Jennings
- Succeeded by: Bob Vanasek

Minnesota State Representative
- In office January 1967 – June 1987

Personal details
- Born: August 19, 1928 Minneapolis, Minnesota, United States
- Died: October 28, 2000 (aged 72) Marine on St. Croix, Minnesota, United States
- Party: DFL
- Spouse(s): Martha Holman Norton, Marvel Jonason Norton
- Children: Jeffrey Norton, Cynthia Norton, Katharine Norton, Kelly Jonason, Bill Jonason
- Education: Wesleyan University; University of Minnesota
- Profession: Attorney, judge

Fred C. Norton (August 19, 1928 – October 28, 2000) was a Minnesota politician, a member of the Democratic-Farmer-Labor Party, a Speaker of the Minnesota House of Representatives, and a judge of the Minnesota Court of Appeals.

Norton was born in 1928 in Minneapolis, Minnesota. He attended the University of Minnesota before graduating in 1950 from Wesleyan University. He later received his law degree from the University of Minnesota Law School.

Norton worked in the office of the Minnesota Attorney General from 1955 to 1965, specializing in tax law. He was elected to the Minnesota House of Representatives in 1966, representing St. Paul, Minnesota. He became Speaker of the House in 1980 after mid-term elections broke a deadlock in the body. He did not have the support of the majority of his caucus, but 49 Independent-Republicans joined 26 DFLers to give him the Speaker's gavel. He served only one year before being replaced by Harry A. Sieben, Jr. after the 1982 elections gave Democrats a larger majority. He later served as minority leader from 1985 to 1987, and became speaker again in January 1987.

Norton resigned from the House in June 1987, accepting an appointment to the Minnesota Court of Appeals by Governor Rudy Perpich. He won election to the court in 1988, and served on the court until he retired in 1997. He died of bone cancer in 2000.

Legal offices
Preceded by David R. Leslie	Associate Justice, Minnesota Court of Appeals; 1987 – 1997	Succeeded by G. Barry Anderson
Political offices
Preceded by Rod Searle	Speaker of the Minnesota House of Representatives; 1980 – 1981	Succeeded by Harry A. Sieben, Jr.
Preceded by David M. Jennings	Speaker of the Minnesota House of Representatives; 1987 – 1987	Succeeded by Robert Vanasek
Preceded by David M. Jennings	Minnesota House Minority Leader; 1985-1987	Succeeded by William R. Schreiber
