= 1894 Minnesota Senate election =

- November 6, 1894

All 54 seats in the Minnesota Senate 28 seats needed for a majority
	Majority party	Minority party	Third party
	GOP	PEO	DEM
Party	Republican	Populist	Democratic
Seats won	46	5	3
Seat change	▲20	New	▼12
Popular vote	148,421	46,912	77,418
Percentage	52.0%	16.4%	27.1%

The 1894 Minnesota Senate election was held in the U.S. state of Minnesota on November 6, 1894, to elect members to the Senate of the 29th and 30th Minnesota Legislatures.

The Minnesota Republican Party won a large majority of seats, followed by the new People's Party and the Minnesota Democratic Party. The new Legislature convened on January 8, 1895.

Numerous Democratic candidates were also endorsed by the People's Party, and one was also endorsed by the Prohibition Party. However, all planned to caucus with the Democrats in the Senate, and are thus listed as part of their total.

== Results ==
Summary of the November 6, 1894 Minnesota Senate election results
Party	Candidates	Votes	Seats	
Party	Candidates	Votes	No.	%
Republican Party	53	148,421	46	52.02
People's Party	36	46,912	5	16.44
Democratic Party	44	77,418	3	27.13
Prohibition Party	11	4036	0	1.41
Independent	12	8,523	0	2.99
Total		285,310	54	100.00
Source: Minnesota Secretary of State

*These totals count candidates endorsed by the Democratic and People's Parties in the totals for the Democratic Party.

== See also ==
- Minnesota gubernatorial election, 1894
