= 1898 Minnesota Senate election =

- November 8, 1898

All 63 seats in the Minnesota Senate 32 seats needed for a majority
	Majority party	Minority party
	GOP	DEM
Party	Republican	Democratic
Seats won	44	17
Seat change	▼2	▲14
Popular vote	136,070	92,740
Percentage	57.8%	39.4%

The 1898 Minnesota Senate election was held in the U.S. state of Minnesota on November 8, 1898, to elect members to the Senate of the 31st and 32nd Minnesota Legislatures.

On the coattails of Democrat John Lind's gubernatorial campaign, the Minnesota Democratic Party saw a minor resurgence in the Senate. The Party consolidated much of the third party support that had become a large factor in the elections of 1890 and 1894. The People's Party endorsed a handful of Democratic candidates that ended up winning and caucusing as Democrats in the Senate.

The Minnesota Republican Party won a large majority of seats followed by the Minnesota Democratic Party. The new Legislature convened on January 3, 1899.

Two independent candidates won election to the Senate, one of whom caucused with Democrats upon being seated. In the 48th District, two Republicans ran against one another, and the winner was the one who had not been endorsed by the Party. Both candidates are listed as Republicans in the vote aggregate.

== Results ==
Summary of the November 8, 1898 Minnesota Senate election results
Party	Candidates	Votes	Seats	
Party	Candidates	Votes	No.	%
Republican Party	64	136,070	44	57.82
Democratic Party	54	92,740	17	39.41
Independent	14	6,530	2	2.77
Total		235,340	63	100.00
Source: Minnesota Secretary of State

*These totals count candidates endorsed by the Democratic and People's Parties in the totals for the Democratic Party.

== See also ==
- Minnesota gubernatorial election, 1898
