= 1906 Minnesota Senate election =

- November 6, 1906

All 63 seats in the Minnesota Senate 32 seats needed for a majority
	Majority party	Minority party	Third party
	GOP	DEM	PEO
Party	Republican	Democratic	Populist
Seats won	43	19	1
Seat change	▼1	▲2	▲1
Popular vote	164,351	61,484	3,454
Percentage	69.5%	26.0%	1.5%

The 1906 Minnesota Senate election was held in the U.S. state of Minnesota on November 6, 1906, to elect members to the Senate of the 35th and 36th Minnesota Legislatures.

The Minnesota Republican Party won a large majority of seats, followed by the Minnesota Democratic Party and the People's Party. The new Legislature convened on January 8, 1907.

31 Republicans and 4 Democrats were uncontested.

== Results ==
Summary of the November 6, 1906 Minnesota Senate election results
Party	Candidates	Votes	Seats	
Party	Candidates	Votes	No.	%
Republican Party	58	164,351	43	69.50
Democratic Party	30	61,484	19	26.00
People's Party	1	3,454	1	1.46
Prohibition Party	2	2,072	0	0.88
Public Ownership Party	3	1,925	0	0.81
Independent	2	3,187	0	1.35
Total		236,473	63	100.00
Source: Minnesota Secretary of State

== See also ==
- Minnesota gubernatorial election, 1906
