= Rod Searle =

American legislator (1920–2014)

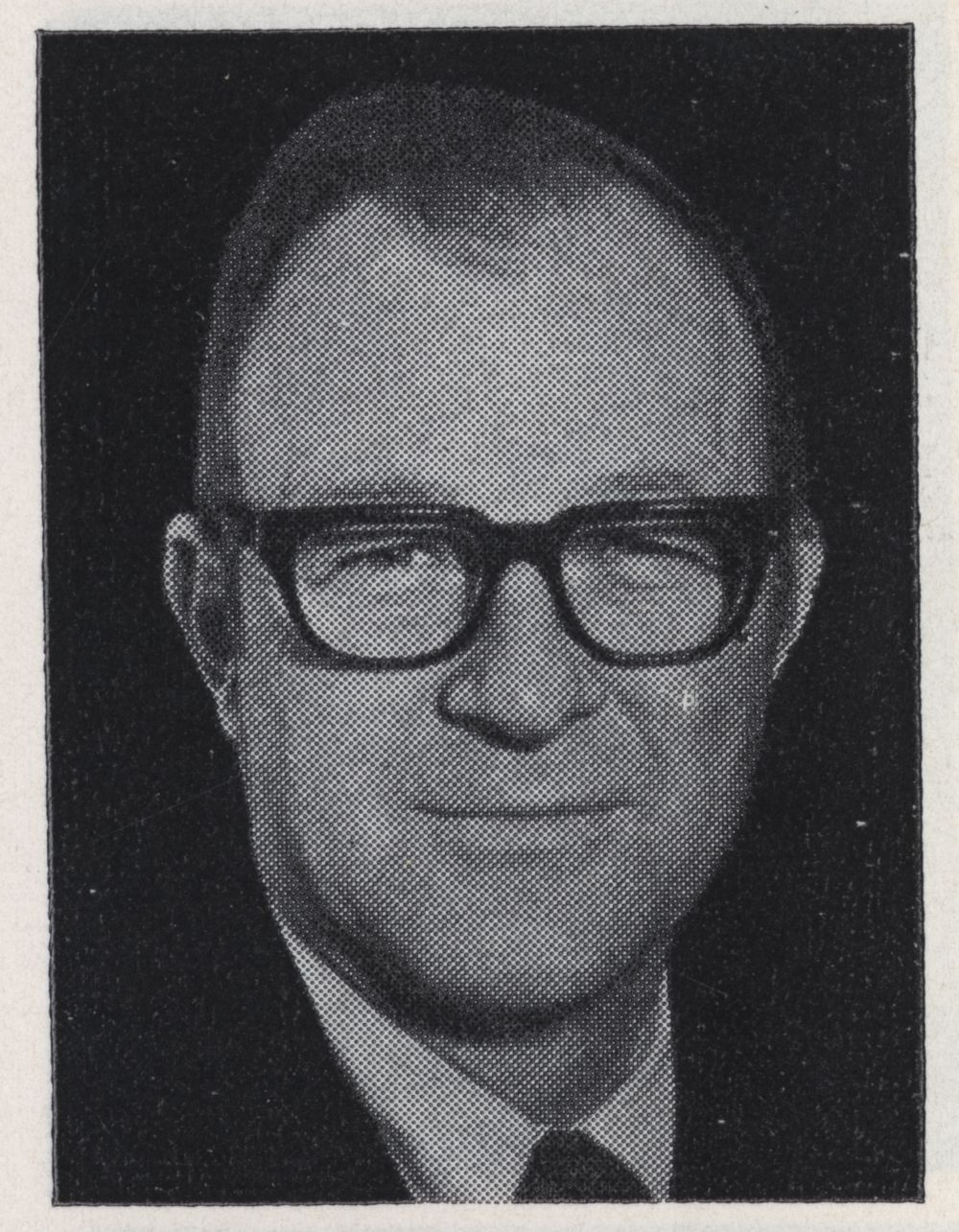

47th Speaker of the Minnesota House of Representatives
- In office 1979–1980
- Preceded by: Martin Olav Sabo
- Succeeded by: Fred Norton

Personal details
- Born: July 17, 1920 Camden, New Jersey, United States
- Died: January 5, 2014 (aged 93)
- Party: Republican; Independent-Republican

Rodney Newell Searle Sr. (July 17, 1920 – January 5, 2014) was a Minnesota farmer, insurance agent, and public servant. Born and raised in urban New Jersey, Searle moved to rural Minnesota in 1947 with his wife Jane and their two young children. With no prior experience in agriculture, they moved to a farm, and soon were raising crops and livestock. He also became heavily involved in community activities.

Searle was elected to the Minnesota House of Representatives in 1956, and spent 24 years as a legislator, and had a particular emphasis in education. In 1979 he was selected by an evenly divided body as Speaker. Searle retired from the legislature after the 1980 session but continued in public service, serving in a variety of public and private volunteer positions for the remainder of his life. He died at his home on January 5, 2014.

== Early life ==
Rod Searle was born July 17, 1920, in Camden, New Jersey to Ruby Marie Barus Searle, a nurse, and newspaper editor William A. Searle. He recalled seeing Babe Ruth hit a home run at Shibe Park in nearby Philadelphia, Pennsylvania. Searle graduated from Haddonfield Memorial High School in Haddonfield, New Jersey. During World War II he worked for Johnson & Johnson in New Brunswick, New Jersey and went to night classes at Rutgers University.

Searle married Janette (Jane) E. Christie on May 17, 1941. In 1946 they began considering relocating from the industrial East to the rural Midwest. Eight months later, in April 1947, the Searles and their two small children made the move, which Searle later characterized as "nearly traumatic at the time", but "turned out to be the biggest and wisest decision of our lives".

They began farming 280 acres of run-down land in rural Waseca County, Minnesota in partnership with Robert Christie III, his brother-in-law, in a career for which they were neither trained nor educated. They obtained advice from the agricultural Experiment Station at Waseca, a branch of the University of Minnesota Waseca, the county extension agent, and neighbors. They grew crops, tended a small dairy herd, and raised sheep and chickens.

They involved themselves in community activities, and Searle was president of the Parent-Teacher Association for the Janesville school system and also led the Waseca County Dairy Herd Improvement Association. He chaired the Waseca County Red Cross, and was in the Janesville-Waseca Squadron of the United States Air Force Auxiliary Civil Air Patrol. He was active in the local Mason lodge, the Episcopal Church, and Republican Party, chairing the Waseca County executive committee of the party.

Searle resumed his college education, transferring his credits earned at Rutgers and attending classes part-time at Minnesota State University, Mankato, obtaining his BA in 1960 while a legislator.

== Legislative career ==
Searle was first elected to represent Waseca County in 1956. He was a part of the Conservative caucus during the period in which Minnesota's legislature was officially nonpartisan. When the legislature started using partisan designations in 1975 he was a Republican. He served on a number of committees, and at various times was Chair of the Higher Education, University and College, and University committees, and Chair of the Education Division of the Appropriations Committee. Searle was named Assistant Minority Leader by his caucus in 1975.

After the election of 1978, the house was divided equally between Independent-Republicans and the Democratic-Farmer-Labor Party. Searle was chosen as speaker in a compromise between the two parties. He later acknowledged the "unique opportunity" as speaker of an evenly divided House, and said of this period: "Out of necessity, and challenged by the legislative concerns of the times, raw politics was minimized, and a system of balance, cooperation and mutual respect produced workable solutions to the problems that confronted us."

In May 1979, Democrats gained a seat, giving the party a majority in the body, and selected Fred C. Norton as Speaker. Searle was named Minority Leader by his caucus.

== Later career ==
Searle retired from the House after conclusion of the 1980 session. In later years, as the Minnesota Republican Party moved further to the right, Searle became an independent, stating "My party has abandoned me." In 2010 Searle was among a group of Republican former lawmakers who endorsed Independence Party candidate for governor Tom Horner, rather than the Republican-endorsed candidate, Tom Emmer. The state Republican party took action against those in the group, preventing them from serving as delegates to the state or national party conventions for two years.

After retirement from the legislature, Searle was president of the Minnesota State University Board, chair of the Minnesota College Merger Board, and chair of the Minnesota Higher Education Board. He served as Chair of the Upper Mississippi River Basin Commission. He also volunteered for the Minnesota Agricultural Interpretive Center ("Farmamerica"), and the Waseca County Historical Society, which he also served as a member of its board of directors.

== Personal life ==
Rod Searle's first wife Jane was a librarian and volunteer who assisted children with reading disabilities. She died on October 10, 2000. Searle said of her that "she was the real speaker of the house", and had assisted him with speeches and writing. They had two sons and a daughter.

Rod Searle married Ruth A. Bartlett in 2001. Searle died on January 5, 2014, at his home since 1947, in Alton Township in rural Waseca County. He was survived by his wife Ruth and his three children from his marriage with Jane.

Political offices
Preceded by Martin Olav Sabo	Speaker of the Minnesota House of Representatives; 1979	Succeeded by Fred C. Norton
Preceded by Paul R. Petrafeso	Minnesota State Representative from District 30B; 1973–81	Succeeded by Jerry E. Schoenfeld
Preceded by district created	Minnesota State Representative from District 9; 1967–73	Succeeded by Arlan Stangeland
Preceded by Howard R. Albertson	Minnesota State Representative from District 8; 1963–67	Succeeded by district abolished
Preceded by Omar C. Dahle	Minnesota State Representative from District 16; 1957–63	Succeeded by Fred H. Berke
