= 1902 Minnesota Senate election =

- November 4, 1902

All 63 seats in the Minnesota Senate 32 seats needed for a majority
	Majority party	Minority party
	GOP	DEM
Party	Republican	Democratic
Seats won	51	12
Seat change	▲7	▼5
Popular vote	158,204	74,235
Percentage	64.4%	30.2%
President pro-tempore before election
Albert Williams
Republican
Elected President pro-tempore
Richard Thompson
Republican

The 1902 Minnesota Senate election was held in the U.S. state of Minnesota on November 4, 1902, to elect members to the Senate of the 33rd and 34th Minnesota Legislatures.

Two years after Democrat John Lind lost the governorship to Republican Samuel Rinnah Van Sant, the Minnesota Democratic Party was set to lose seats in the Senate. Without Lind, the Party lost the third party support that they had consolidated in 1898. The People's Party ran candidates against a handful of Democratic candidates in rural areas, hurting Democratic prospects.

The Minnesota Republican Party won a large majority of seats, followed by the Minnesota Democratic Party. The new Legislature convened on January 6, 1903.

16 Republicans and 3 Democrats ran uncontested.

== Results ==
Summary of the November 4, 1902 Minnesota Senate election results
Party	Candidates	Votes		Seats
Party	Candidates	#	%	Seats
Republican Party	60	158,204	54.42	51
Democratic Party	41	74,235	30.23	12
People's Party	6	9,468	3.86	0
Prohibition Party	3	589	0.24	0
Independent	2	2,836	1.15	0
Total		245,578	100.00	63
Source: Minnesota Secretary of State

== See also ==
- Minnesota gubernatorial election, 1902
