= 1982 Minnesota Senate election =

Minnesota Senate election, 1982
- November 2, 1982

All 67 seats in the Minnesota Senate 34 seats needed for a majority
	Majority party	Minority party
Leader	Roger Moe	Bob Ashbach
Party	Democratic (DFL)	Ind.-Republican
Leader since	1980	1975
Leader's seat	2nd–Ada	48th–Saint Paul (retired)
Last election	45 seats	22 seats
Seats before	44	23
Seats won	42	25
Seat change	▼2	▲2
Popular vote	951,287	731,291
Majority Leader before election
Roger Moe
Democratic (DFL)
Elected Majority Leader
Roger Moe
Democratic (DFL)

The 1982 Minnesota Senate election was held in the U.S. state of Minnesota on November 2, 1982, to elect members to the Senate of the 73rd and 74th Minnesota Legislatures. A primary election was held on September 14, 1982.

The Minnesota Democratic–Farmer–Labor Party (DFL) won a majority of seats, remaining the majority party, followed by the Independent-Republicans of Minnesota. The new Legislature convened on January 4, 1983.

== Results ==
Summary of the November 2, 1982 Minnesota Senate election results
Party	Candidates	Votes	Seats		
Party	Candidates	Votes	No.	∆No.	%
Minnesota Democratic–Farmer–Labor Party	65	951,287	42	▼2	62.69
Independent-Republicans of Minnesota	63	731,291	25	▲2	37.31
Independent	N/A	34,437	0	Steady	0.00
Write-in	N/A	4,371	0	Steady	0.00
Total			67	±0	100.00
Turnout (out of 2,943,169 eligible voters)	1,834,737	62.34%		▼9.80 pp	
Source: Minnesota Secretary of State, Minnesota Legislative Reference Library

== See also ==
- Minnesota House of Representatives election, 1982
- Minnesota gubernatorial election, 1982
