= David M. Jennings =

American politician (1948–2023)

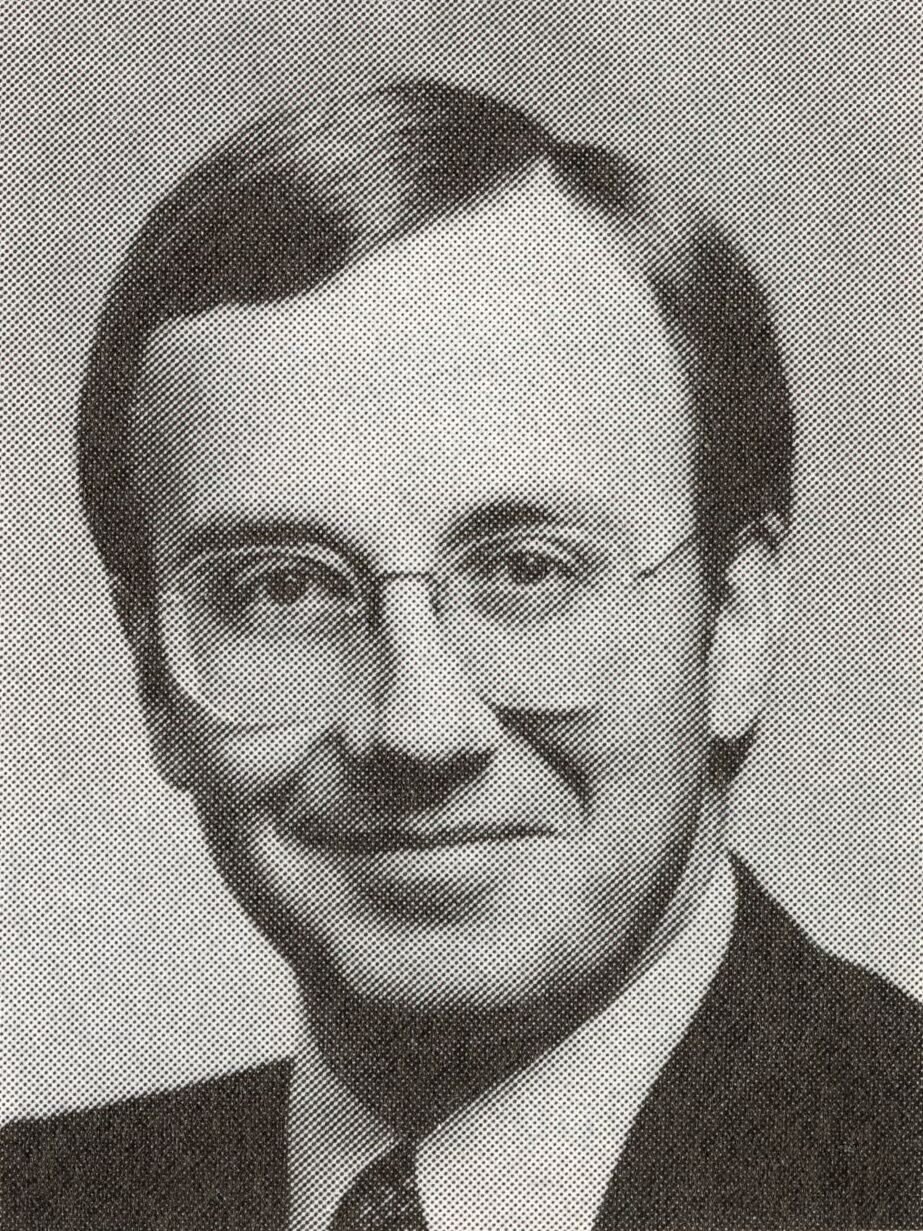

Minnesota Commissioner of Commerce
- In office January 8, 1999 – August 6, 1999

50th Speaker of the Minnesota House of Representatives
- In office January 8, 1985 – January 5, 1987
- Preceded by: Harry A. Sieben. Jr.
- Succeeded by: Fred Norton

Minnesota State Representative from Martin and Watonwan Counties
- In office January 3, 1979 – January 5, 1987
- Preceded by: Darrel Peterson
- Succeeded by: Gene Hugoson

Personal details
- Born: December 17, 1948 Truman, Minnesota, U.S.
- Died: May 21, 2023 (aged 74)
- Party: Independent-Republican
- Education: Minnesota State University, Mankato
- Profession: Legislator, school superintendent

David M. Jennings (December 17, 1948 – May 21, 2023) was an American politician from the state of Minnesota. A member of the Republican Party, he served as Speaker of the Minnesota House of Representatives, and the superintendent of Eastern Carver County School District 112, based in Chaska.

Jennings served in the United States Marine Corps for five years and was honorably discharged with the rank of staff-sergeant in December 1972. He received a B.S. degree in political science, magna cum laude, from Minnesota State University, Mankato in 1976. He worked in small construction and as a Congressional staff aide until he was first elected to the Minnesota House of Representatives in 1978.

Jennings rose quickly, becoming minority leader in February 1982. He served in that role until the Independent-Republicans gained a majority in the 1984 elections. He became Speaker of the House in January 1985, a position he held for two years until his departure from the legislature.

Beginning in 1990, Jennings was employed as a corporate executive for Schwan's Food Co., based in Marshall, Minnesota, leaving there in December 1998.

In 1999, Jennings served briefly as Minnesota's Commissioner of Commerce under Governor Jesse Ventura, after which he became CEO of the Minneapolis Regional Chamber of Commerce. In January 2002, Jennings became Chief Operating Officer of the Minneapolis Public Schools and later served as interim superintendent of the Minneapolis school district from October 2003 to June 2004. He was considered for permanent appointment, but withdrew from consideration after the appointment process was criticized. He went on to serve as deputy director of operations for the Minnesota Historical Society for one year, before accepting a permanent appointment as superintendent of schools for the Eastern Carver County School District, based in Chaska in July 2005.

Jennings was married and had one son and stepson. He died on May 21, 2023, at the age of 74.

Party political offices
Preceded by Don Koenig	Republican nominee for Minnesota Secretary of State; 1990	Succeeded by Richard Kimbler
Political offices
Preceded by Harry A. Sieben Jr.	Speaker of the Minnesota House of Representatives; 1985–1987	Succeeded by Fred Norton
Preceded by Glen Sherwood	Minnesota House Minority Leader; 1982–1985	Succeeded by Fred Norton
Preceded by Douglas W. Carlson	State Representative from Minnesota District 29A; 1983–1987	Succeeded by Mark J. Piepho
Preceded by Darrell L. Peterson	State Representative from Minnesota District 27B; 1979–1983	Succeeded by Wendell Erickson
