= 2026 Minnesota House of Representatives election =

Legislative election in Minnesota

- November 3, 2026

All 134 seats in the Minnesota House of Representatives 68 seats needed for a majority
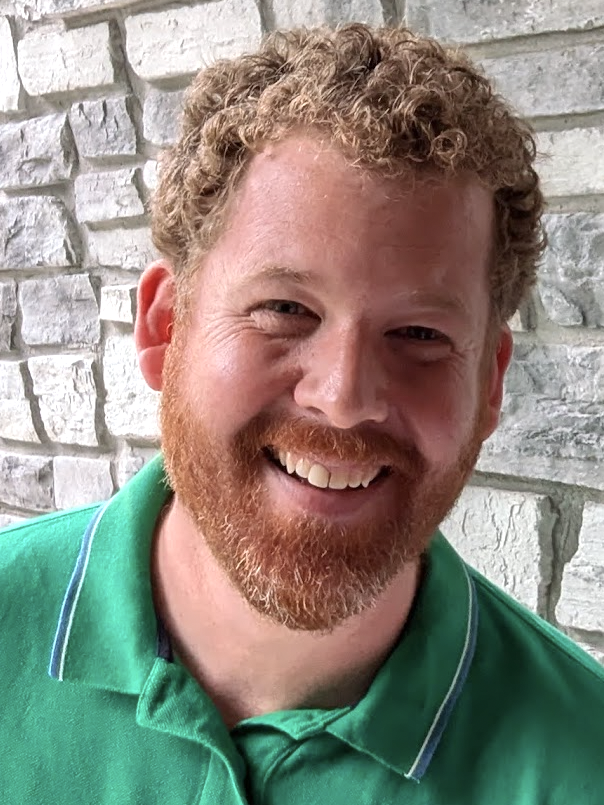

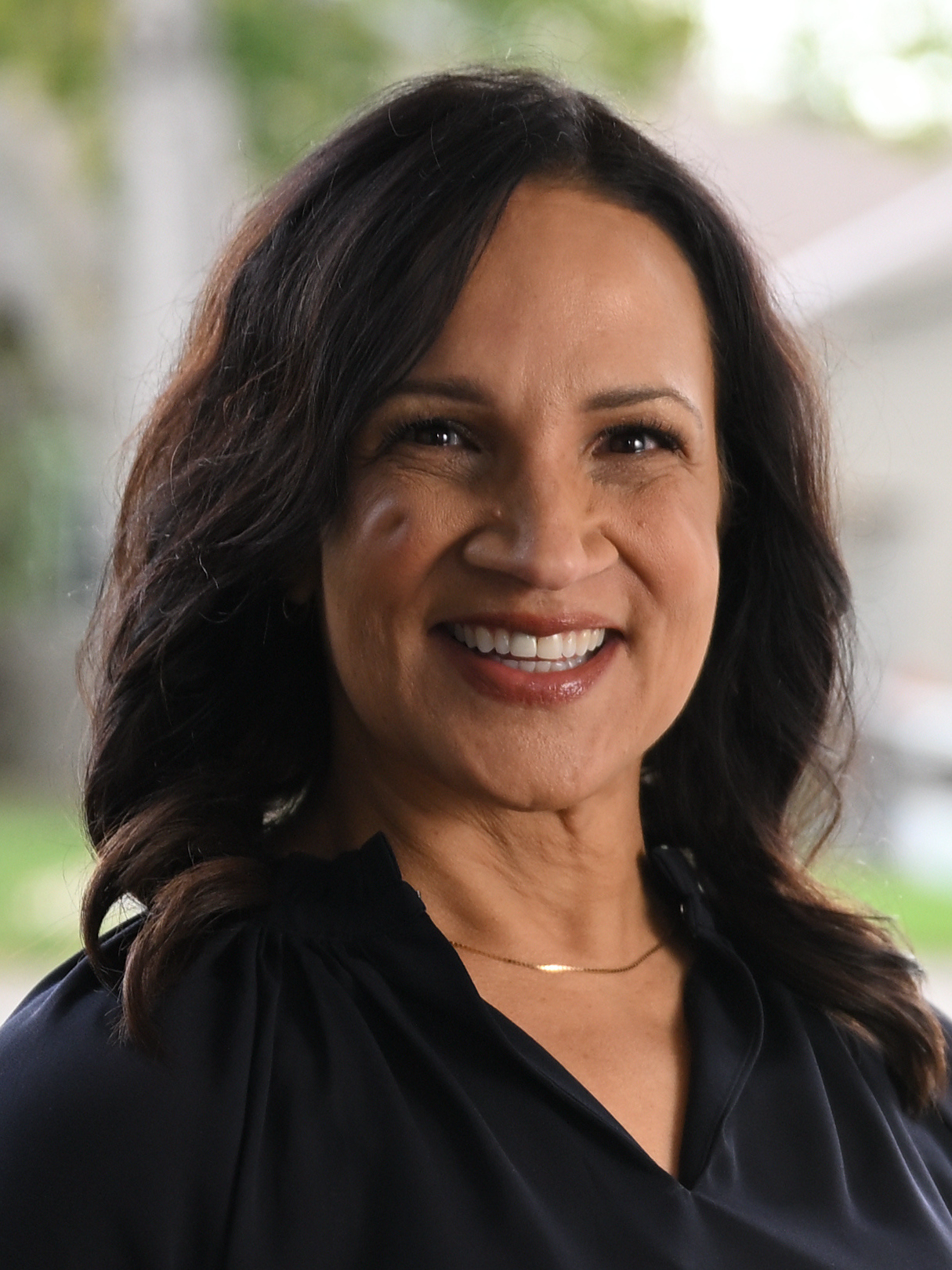
	Majority party	Minority party
Leader	Zack Stephenson	Lisa Demuth (retiring)
Party	Democratic (DFL)	Republican
Leader since	September 9, 2025	January 3, 2023
Leader's seat	35A–Coon Rapids	13A–Cold Spring
Last election	67 seats, 49.95%	67 seats, 49.48%
Seats before	67	67
Seats after	77	57
Seat change	▲10	▼10
- Results: DFL hold DFL gain Republican hold Result TBD
Speaker before election
Lisa Demuth
Republican
Elected Speaker
TBD

The 2026 Minnesota House of Representatives election took place on November 3, 2026. All 134 districts in the Minnesota House of Representatives were up for election. Primary elections were held on August 11, 2026. Before the election, 67 seats were held by Republicans and 67 seats were held by DFLers. The Democratic-Farmer-Labor Party won a majority of 77 seats.

The election coincided with the election of the State Senate and various state and local elections.

Elected members will take office on January 12, 2027, joining the 95th Minnesota Legislature.

== Background ==
In the 2024 election, the Minnesota Democratic-Farmer-Labor Party lost a majority, as Republicans tied the chamber, 67–67. The Republicans gained a temporary majority after a successful legal challenge in district 40B. DFL representatives held a boycott of the first three weeks of the legislative sessions, in an attempt to deny the Republicans a quorum, until the two parties made a power-sharing agreement on February 5. On February 6, Republican Lisa Demuth was elected speaker. Power in the chamber fluctuated as vacancies broke the tie and special elections restored it. On June 14, 2025, DFL leader and former House Speaker Melissa Hortman was assassinated in her home by a gunman who also attempted to assassinate a member of the Senate.

== Summary of results ==
↓
77	57
Democratic-Farmer-Labor	Republican

Party	Candidates	Votes			Seats		
Party	Candidates	No.	%	± (pp)	No.	±	%
Minnesota Democratic–Farmer–Labor Party	134	1,548,584	56.50%	+6.55	77	▲10	57.46%
Republican Party of Minnesota	117	1,168,853	42.64%	-6.84	57	▼10	42.54%
Independent	2	15,154	0.55%	+0.50	0	±0	0.0
Write-in	—N/a	8,439	0.31%	+0.06	0	±0	0.0
Total			100	N/A	134	N/A	100
Source: Minnesota Secretary of State

== Outgoing incumbents ==
=== Retiring ===
- Patti Anderson (R–Dellwood), representing district 33A since 2023, is retiring.
- Peggy Bennett (R–Albert Lea), representing district 23A since 2023, (Note: Previously elected to District 27A in 2014, 2016, 2018, and 2020) is retiring after initially running for governor. She withdrew from the gubernatorial election after her running mate decided against running shortly before the filing deadline.
- Elliott Engen (R–White Bear Township), representing district 36A since 2023, announced his retirement to run for state auditor. He withdrew from the auditor election to be Bennett's gubernatorial running mate, then changed his mind and filed to run for reelection instead, preventing Bennett from continuing her campaign for governor. He then withdrew from the House election.
- Sandra Feist (DFL–New Brighton), representing district 39B since 2023, (Note: Previously elected to District 41B in 2020) is retiring.
- Heather Keeler (DFL–Moorhead), representing district 4A since 2021, is retiring after failing to file for election to the U.S. House of Representatives.
- Erin Koegel (DFL–Spring Lake Park), representing district 39A since 2023, (Note: Previously elected to District 37A in 2016, 2018, and 2020) is retiring.
- Ron Kresha (R–Little Falls), representing district 10A since 2023, (Note: Previously elected to District 9B in 2012) is retiring.
- Kelly Moller (DFL–Shoreview), representing district 40A since 2023, (Note: Previously elected to District 42A in 2018) is retiring.
- Paul Novotny (R–Elk River), representing district 30B since 2023, (Note: Previously elected to District 30A in Feb. 2020 and Nov. 2020) is retiring.
- Tim O'Driscoll (R–Sartell), representing district 13B since 2013, (Note: Previously elected to District 14A in 2010) is retiring.
- Kristin Robbins (R–Maple Grove), representing district 37A since 2023, (Note: Previously elected to District 34A in 2018) is retiring after initially running for governor.
- Joe Schomacker (R–Luverne), representing district 21A since 2023, (Note: Previously elected to District 22A in 2010, 2012, 2014, 2016, 2018, and 2020) is retiring.
- Chris Swedzinski (R–Ghent), representing district 15A since 2023, (Note: Previously elected to District 21A in 2010 and elected to District 16A in 2012, 2014, 2016, 2018, and 2020) is retiring.
- Paul Torkelson (R–Saint James), representing district 15B since 2023, (Note: Previously elected to District 21B in 2008, and 2010 and elected to District 16B in 2012, 2014, 2016, 2018, and 2020) is retiring.
- Dan Wolgamott (DFL–St. Cloud), representing district 14B since 2019, is retiring after initially running for state auditor

=== Seeking other office ===
- Ben Bakeberg (R–Jordan), representing district 54B since 2023, is retiring to run for the Minnesota Senate in District 54.
- Kaela Berg (DFL–Burnsville), representing district 55B since 2023, (Note: Previously elected to District 56B in 2020) is retiring to run for the U.S. House of Representatives.
- Lisa Demuth (R–Cold Spring), representing district 13A since 2019, is retiring to run for governor.
- Tom Dippel (R–Cottage Grove), representing district 41B since 2025, is retiring to run for the Minnesota Senate in District 41.
- Cedrick Frazier (DFL–New Hope), representing district 43A since 2023, (Note: Previously elected to District 45A in 2020) is retiring to run for Hennepin County Attorney.
- Mike Freiberg (DFL–Golden Valley), representing district 43B since 2023, (Note: Previously elected to District 45B in 2012) is retiring to run for the Minnesota Senate in District 43.
- Steve Jacob (R–Altura), representing district 20B since 2023, is retiring to run for the Minnesota Senate in District 20.
- María Isa Pérez-Vega (DFL–St. Paul), representing district 65B since 2023, is retiring to run for the Ramsey County Commission.
- Bernie Perryman (R–St. Augusta), representing district 14A since 2023, is retiring to run for the Minnesota Senate in District 14.
- Liz Reyer (DFL–Eagan), representing district 52A since 2023, (Note: Previously elected to District 51B in 2020) is retiring to run for the Minnesota Senate in District 52.
- Mike Wiener (R–Long Prairie), representing district 5B since 2023, is retiring to run for the Minnesota Senate in District 5.

== Predictions ==
Source	Ranking	As of
Sabato's Crystal Ball	Tossup	January 22, 2026
State Navigate	Likely D (flip)	August 27, 2026

== Campaign ==
=== Fundraising ===
Campaign finance reports as of December 31, 2025 (Note: per the January 1 – December 31 Year-End Report)
Committee	Raised	Spent	Cash on hand
House Republican Campaign Committee	$1,742,606	$754,134	$1,167,280
DFL House Caucus	$2,623,145	$1,570,816	$1,595,304
Source: Minnesota Campaign Finance Board

== District summary ==
† - Incumbent not seeking reelection.

District		2024 Pres.	Incumbent			Elected representative	
District		2024 Pres.	Name	Party	First elected	Name	Party
1	A	R+41.5	John Burkel	Rep	2020	John Burkel	Rep
1	B	R+32.3	Steve Gander	Rep	2024	Steve Gander	Rep
2	A	R+6.9	Bidal Duran Jr.	Rep	2024	Bidal Duran Jr.	Rep
2	B	R+25.4	Matt Bliss	Rep	2016; 2018 (defeated); 2020	Matt Bliss	Rep
3	A	R+7.1	Roger Skraba	Rep	2022	Roger Skraba	Rep
3	B	D+4.1	Natalie Zeleznikar	Rep	2022	Aaron Schweiger	DFL (flip)
4	A	D+15.1	Heather Keeler†	DFL	2020	Erika Yoney	DFL
4	B	R+24.7	Jim Joy	Rep	2022	Jim Joy	Rep
5	A	R+40.4	Krista Knudsen	Rep	2022	Krista Knudsen	Rep
5	B	R+52.2	Mike Wiener†	Rep	2022	Jonathan Claussen	Rep
6	A	R+26.1	Ben Davis	Rep	2022	Ben Davis	Rep
6	B	R+27.7	Josh Heintzeman	Rep	2014	Josh Heintzeman	Rep
7	A	R+17.7	Spencer Igo	Rep	2020	Spancer Igo	Rep
7	B	R+9.2	Cal Warwas	Rep	2024	Carl Warwas	Rep
8	A	D+35.3	Peter Johnson	DFL	2024	Peter Johnson	DFL
8	B	D+42.2	Liish Kozlowski	DFL	2022	Liish Kozlowski	DFL
9	A	R+28.8	Jeff Backer	Rep	2014	Jeff Backer	Rep
9	B	R+40.0	Tom Murphy	Rep	2022	Tom Murphy	Rep
10	A	R+40.5	Ron Kresha†	Rep	2012	Mark Streimer	Rep
10	B	R+58.2	Isaac Schultz	Rep	2022	Isaac Shultz	Rep
11	A	R+3.8	Jeff Dotseth	Rep	2022	Chris Swanson	DFL (flip)
11	B	R+38.5	Nathan Nelson	Rep	2019 (special)	Nathan Nelson	Rep
12	A	R+36.8	Paul Anderson	Rep	2008	Paul Anderson	Rep
12	B	R+37.8	Mary Franson	Rep	2010	Mary Franson	Rep
13	A	R+42.0	Lisa Demuth†	Rep	2018	Tanja Goering	Rep
13	B	R+26.1	Tim O'Driscoll†	Rep	2010	Dawn Loberg	Rep
14	A	R+6.4	Bernie Perryman†	Rep	2022	Abdi Daisane	DFL (flip)
14	B	R+1.7	Dan Wolgamott†	DFL	2018	Zach Dorholt	DFL
15	A	R+33.7	Chris Swedzinski	Rep	2010	Brad Hennen	Rep
15	B	R+37.4	Paul Torkelson†	Rep	2008	Geri Theis	Rep
16	A	R+38.8	Scott Van Binsbergen	Rep	2024	Scott Van Binsbergen	Rep
16	B	R+30.7	Dave Baker	Rep	2014	Dave Baker	Rep
17	A	R+38.9	Dawn Gillman	Rep	2022	Dawn Gillman	Rep
17	B	R+36.0	Bobbie Harder	Rep	2022	Bobbie Harder	Rep
18	A	R+1.3	Erica Schwartz	Rep	2024	Leah Hanson	DFL (flip)
18	B	D+11.8	Luke Frederick	DFL	2020	Luke Frederick	DFL
19	A	R+28.2	Keith Allen	Rep	2024	Keith Allen	Rep
19	B	R+22.2	Thomas Sexton	Rep	2024	Thomas Sexton	Rep
20	A	R+12.3	Pam Altendorf	Rep	2022	Pam Altendorf	Rep
20	B	R+30.5	Steven Jacob†	Rep	2022	Sara Bertschinger	Rep
21	A	R+44.5	Joe Schomacker†	Rep	2010	Krist Wollum	Rep
21	B	R+32.8	Marj Fogelman	Rep	2022	Marj Fogelman	Rep
22	A	R+33.9	Bjorn Olson	Rep	2020	Bjorn Olson	Rep
22	B	R+33.5	Terry Stier	Rep	2024	Terry Stier	Rep
23	A	R+27.3	Peggy Bennett†	Rep	2014	Nick Ronnenberg	Rep
23	B	R+11.1	Patricia Mueller	Rep	2020	Patricia Mueller	Rep
24	A	R+22.5	Duane Quam	Rep	2010	Duane Quam	Rep
24	B	D+16.8	Tina Liebling	DFL	2004	Tina Liebling	DFL
25	A	D+15.9	Kim Hicks	DFL	2022	Kim Hicks	DFL
25	B	D+28.8	Andy Smith	DFL	2022	Andy Smith	DFL
26	A	R+0.3	Aaron Repinski	Rep	2024	Dan Wilson	DFL (flip)
26	B	R+22.5	Greg Davids	Rep	1991 (special); 2006 (defeated); 2008	Greg Davids	Rep
27	A	R+41.0	Shane Mekeland	Rep	2018	Shane Mekeland	Rep
27	B	R+45.9	Bryan Lawrence	Rep	2024 (special)	Bryan Lawrence	Rep
28	A	R+38.3	Jimmy Gordon	Rep	2024	Jimmy Gordon	Rep
28	B	R+29.5	Max Rymer	Rep	2024	Max Rymer	Rep
29	A	R+35.2	Joe McDonald	Rep	2010	Joe McDonald	Rep
29	B	R+28.0	Marion Rarick	Rep	2012	Marion Rarick	Rep
30	A	R+24.5	Walter Hudson	Rep	2022	Walter Hudson	Rep
30	B	R+26.4	Paul Novotny	Rep	2020 (special)	Chad Westberg	Rep
31	A	R+17.2	Harry Niska	Rep	2022	Harry Niska	Rep
31	B	R+33.3	Peggy Scott	Rep	2008	Peggy Scott	Rep
32	A	R+7.2	Nolan West	Rep	2016	Nolan West	Rep
32	B	D+1.0	Matt Norris	DFL	2022	Matt Norris	DFL
33	A	R+7.5	Patti Anderson	Rep	2022	Stacey Stout	Rep
33	B	D+8.6	Josiah Hill	DFL	2022	Josiah Hill	DFL
34	A	D+0.9	Danny Nadeau	Rep	2022	Jason Heaser	DFL (flip)
34	B	D+27.4	Xp Lee	DFL	2025 (special)	Xp Lee	DFL
35	A	D+3.5	Zack Stephenson	DFL	2018	Zack Stephenson	DFL
35	B	D+2.6	Kari Rehrauer	DFL	2024	Kari Rehrauer	DFL
36	A	D+2.0	Elliott Engen	Rep	2022	Jim DeMay	DFL (flip)
36	B	D+16.6	Brion Curran	DFL	2022	Brion Curran	DFL
37	A	R+0.4	Kristin Robbins†	Rep	2018	Tom McKee	Rep
37	B	D+17.1	Kristin Bahner	DFL	2018	Kristin Bahner	DFL
38	A	D+34.3	Huldah Hiltsley	DFL	2024	Huldah Hiltsley	DFL
38	B	D+44.0	Samantha Vang	DFL	2018	Samantha Vang	DFL
39	A	D+26.3	Erin Koegel†	DFL	2016	Aaron Klemz	DFL
39	B	D+41.6	Sandra Feist†	DFL	2020	Amáda Márquez Simula	DFL
40	A	D+26.8	Kelly Moller†	DFL	2018	Aisha Elmquist	DFL
40	B	D+38.6	David Gottfried	DFL	2025 (special)	David Gottfried	DFL
41	A	D+4.2	Wayne Johnson	Rep	2024	Cole Birkeland	DFL (flip)
41	B	R+1.9	Tom Dippel†	Rep	2024	Jen Fox	DFL (flip)
42	A	D+24.2	Ned Carroll	DFL	2022	Ned Carroll	DFL
42	B	D+29.4	Ginny Klevorn	DFL	2018	Ginny Klevorn	DFL
43	A	D+37.0	Cedrick Frazier†	DFL	2020	Kyrstin Schuette	DFL
43	B	D+52.0	Mike Freiberg†	DFL	2012	Jess Lewis	DFL
44	A	D+25.1	Peter Fischer	DFL	2012	Peter Fischer	DFL
44	B	D+16.3	Leon Lillie	DFL	2004	Leon Lillie	DFL
45	A	D+1.7	Andrew Myers	Rep	2022	Andrew Myers	Rep
45	B	D+31.2	Patty Acomb	DFL	2018	Patty Acomb	DFL
46	A	D+53.2	Larry Kraft	DFL	2022	Larry Kraft	DFL
46	B	D+43.9	Cheryl Youakim	DFL	2014	Cheryl Youakim	DFL
47	A	D+25.3	Shelley Buck	DFL	2026 (special)	Shelley Buck	DFL
47	B	D+18.6	Ethan Cha	DFL	2022	Ethan Cha	DFL
48	A	R+9.1	Jim Nash	Rep	2014	Jim Nash	Rep
48	B	D+10.4	Lucy Rehm	DFL	2022	Lucy Rehm	DFL
49	A	D+31.3	Alex Falconer	DFL	2024	Alex Falconer	DFL
49	B	D+26.4	Carlie Kotyza-Witthuhn	DFL	2018	Carlie Kotyza-Witthuhn	DFL
50	A	D+40.0	Julie Greene	DFL	2024	Julie Greene	DFL
50	B	D+31.1	Steve Elkins	DFL	2018	Steve Elkins	DFL
51	A	D+48.9	Michael Howard	DFL	2018	Michael Howard	DFL
51	B	D+29.1	Nathan Coulter	DFL	2022	Nathan Coulter	DFL
52	A	D+26.6	Liz Reyer†	DFL	2020	Christos Jensen	DFL
52	B	D+30.1	Bianca Virnig	DFL	2023 (special)	Bianca Virnig	DFL
53	A	D+20.5	Mary Frances Clardy	DFL	2022	Mary Frances Clardy	DFL
53	B	D+13.0	Rick Hansen	DFL	2004	Rick Hansen	DFL
54	A	D+4.5	Brad Tabke	DFL	2018	Brad Tabke	DFL
54	B	R+12.1	Ben Bakeberg†	Rep	2022	Natalie Barnes	Rep
55	A	D+10.6	Jessica Hanson	DFL	2020	Jessica Hanson	DFL
55	B	D+20.9	Kaela Berg†	DFL	2020	Hunter Cantrell	DFL
56	A	D+22.7	Robert Bierman	DFL	2018	Robert Bierman	DFL
56	B	D+14.3	John Huot	DFL	2018	John Huot	DFL
57	A	R+15.1	Jon Koznick	Rep	2014	Jon Koznick	Rep
57	B	D+2.1	Jeff Witte	Rep	2022	Brian Cohn	DFL (flip)
58	A	D+6.2	Kristi Pursell	DFL	2022	Kristi Pursell	DFL
58	B	R+19.1	Drew Roach	Rep	2024	Drew Roach	Rep
59	A	D+63.5	Fue Lee	DFL	2016	Fue Lee	DFL
59	B	D+68.5	Esther Agbaje	DFL	2020	Esther Agbaje	DFL
60	A	D+69.7	Sydney Jordan	DFL	2020 (special)	Sydney Jordan	DFL
60	B	D+65.8	Mohamud Noor	DFL	2018	Mohamud Noor	DFL
61	A	D+74.4	Katie Jones	DFL	2024	Katie Jones	DFL
61	B	D+79.5	Jamie Long	DFL	2018	Jamie Long	DFL
62	A	D+75.3	Anquam Mahamoud	DFL	2024	Anquam Mahamoud	DFL
62	B	D+76.5	Aisha Gomez	DFL	2018	Aisha Gomez	DFL
63	A	D+78.6	Samantha Sencer-Mura	DFL	2022	Samantha Sencer-Mura	DFL
63	B	D+75.2	Emma Greenman	DFL	2020	Emma Greenman	DFL
64	A	D+70.9	Meg Luger-Nikolai	DFL	2026 (special)	Meg Luger-Nikolai	DFL
64	B	D+64.1	Dave Pinto	DFL	2014	Dave Pinto	DFL
65	A	D+55.7	Samakab Hussein	DFL	2022	Samakab Hussein	DFL
65	B	D+53.6	María Isa Pérez-Vega†	DFL	2022	Sebastian Ellefson	DFL
66	A	D+65.6	Leigh Finke	DFL	2022	Leigh Finke	DFL
66	B	D+47.9	Athena Hollins	DFL	2020	Athena Hollins	DFL
67	A	D+34.6	Liz Lee	DFL	2022	Liz Lee	DFL
67	B	D+39.9	Jay Xiong	DFL	2018	Jay Xiong	DFL

== Results by district ==
Source: Minnesota Secretary of State

=== District 1A ===
Incumbent Republican John Burkel was reelected in 2024 with 76.07% of the vote.

==== Candidates ====
- John Burkel (Republican)
- Leanna Sandahl (DFL)

==== Results ====
District 1A general election
Party	Candidate	Votes	%
Republican	John Burkel	13,258	71.91%
Democratic (DFL)	Leanna Sandahl	5,170	28.04%
Write-in		9	0.05%
Total votes		18,437	100.00
Republican hold			

=== District 1B ===
Incumbent Republican Steve Gander won the open seat in 2024 with 67.20% of the vote.

==== Candidates ====
- Steve Gander (Republican)
- Jennifer Compeau (DFL)

==== Results ====
District 1B general election
Party	Candidate	Votes	%
Republican	Steve Gander	11,092	65.96%
Democratic (DFL)	Jennifer Compeau	5,716	33.99%
Write-in		9	0.05%
Total votes		16,817	100.00%
Republican hold			

=== District 2A ===
Incumbent Republican Bidal Duran Jr. won the open seat in 2024 with 51.86% of the vote.

==== Candidates ====
- Bidal Duran Jr. (Republican)
- Reed Olson (DFL)

==== Results ====
District 2A general election
Party	Candidate	Votes	%
Republican	Bidal Duran Jr.	9,120	50.52%
Democratic (DFL)	Reed Olson	8,882	49.21%
Write-in		49	0.27%
Total votes		18,051	100.00
Republican hold			

=== District 2B ===
Incumbent Republican Matt Bliss was reelected in 2024 with 63.73% of the vote.

==== Candidates ====
- Matt Bliss (Republican)
- Emily Thabes (DFL)

==== Results ====
District 2B general election
Party	Candidate	Votes	%
Republican	Matt Bliss	12,008	61.14%
Democratic (DFL)	Emily Thabes	7,621	38.80%
Write-in		12	0.06%
Total votes			100.00
Republican hold			

=== District 3A ===
Incumbent Republican Roger Skraba was reelected in 2024 with 55.54% of the vote.

==== Candidates ====
- Roger Skraba (Republican)
- Aaron Kania (DFL)

==== Results ====
District 3A general election
Party	Candidate	Votes	%
Republican	Roger Skraba	11,715	51.79%
Democratic (DFL)	Aaron Kania	10,888	48.13%
Write-in		19	0.08%
Total votes		22,622	100.00
Republican hold			

=== District 3B ===
Incumbent Republican Natalie Zeleznikar was reelected in 2024 with 50.25% of the vote.

==== Candidates ====
- Natalie Zeleznikar (Republican)
- Aaron Schweiger (DFL)

==== Results ====
District 3B general election
Party	Candidate	Votes	%
Democratic (DFL)	Aaron Schweiger	12,262	53.01%
Republican	Natalie Zeleznikar	10,851	46.91%
Write-in		19	0.08%
Total votes		23,132	100.00
Democratic (DFL) gain from Republican			

=== District 4A ===
Incumbent DFLer Heather Keeler, who was reelected in 2024 with 58.50% of the vote, is retiring to run for the U.S. House of Representatives.

==== Candidates ====
- Andrew Rockhold (Republican)
- Shelly Carlson (DFL)
- Erika Yoney (DFL)
- Shelly Carlson (declared write-in)

==== Primary ====
District 4A DFL primary
Party	Candidate	Votes	%
Democratic (DFL)	Erika Yoney	2,855	65.69%
Democratic (DFL)	Shelly Carlson	1,491	34.31%
Total votes		4,346	100.00%

==== Results ====
District 4A general election
Party	Candidate	Votes	%
Democratic (DFL)	Erika Yoney	10,761	66.39%
Republican	Andrew Rockhold	5,414	33.40%
Write-in		33	0.20%
Total votes		16,208	100.00
Democratic (DFL) hold			

=== District 4B ===
Incumbent Republican Jim Joy was reelected in 2024 with 66.41% of the vote.

==== Candidates ====
- Jim Joy (Republican)
- Thaddeus Laugisch (DFL)

==== Results ====
District 4B general election
Party	Candidate	Votes	%
Republican	Jim Joy	12,350	62.61%
Democratic (DFL)	Thaddeus Laugisch	7,365	37.34%
Write-in		10	0.05%
Total votes		19,725	100.00
Republican hold			

=== District 5A ===
Incumbent Republican Krista Knudsen was reelected in 2024 with 71.34% of the vote.

==== Candidates ====
- Krista Knudsen (Republican)
- Dan S. Mitchell (DFL)

==== Results ====
District 5A general election
Party	Candidate	Votes	%
Republican	Krista Knudsen	15,910	69.16%
Democratic (DFL)	Dan S. Mitchell	7,082	30.78%
Write-in		14	0.06%
Total votes		23,006	100.00
Republican hold			

=== District 5B ===
Incumbent Republican Mike Wiener, who was reelected in 2024 with 75.38% of the vote, retired to run for Minnesota Senate in District 5.

==== Candidates ====
- Jonathan Claussen (Republican)
- Maggie Evers (DFL)

==== Results ====
District 5B general election
Party	Candidate	Votes	%
Republican	Jonathan Claussen	14,453	74.12%
Democratic (DFL)	Maggie Evers	5,041	25.85%
Write-in		5	0.03%
Total votes		19,499	100.00
Republican hold			

=== District 6A ===
Incumbent Republican Ben Davis was reelected in 2024 with 66.04% of the vote.

==== Candidates ====
- Ben Davis (Republican)
- Samuel Grigsby (DFL)

==== Results ====
District 6A general election
Party	Candidate	Votes	%
Republican	Ben Davis	14,401	62.09%
Democratic (DFL)	Samuel Grigsby	8,780	37.85%
Write-in		13	0.06%
Total votes		23,194	100.00
Republican hold			

=== District 6B ===
Incumbent Republican Josh Heintzeman was reelected in 2024 with 63.40% of the vote.

==== Candidates ====
- Josh Heintzeman (Republican)
- Matthew Eric Zinda (Republican)
- Nicky Hardy (DFL)

==== Primary ====
District 6B Republican primary
Party	Candidate	Votes	%
Republican	Josh Heintzeman	3,796	88.82%
Republican	Matthew Eric Zinda	478	11.18%
Total votes		4,274	100.00%

==== Results ====
District 6B general election
Party	Candidate	Votes	%
Republican	Josh Heintzeman	12,785	60.83%
Democratic (DFL)	Nicky Hardy	8,220	39.11%
Write-in		14	0.07%
Total votes		21,019	100.00
Republican hold			

=== District 7A ===
Incumbent Republican Spencer Igo was reelected in 2024 with 60.31% of the vote.

==== Candidates ====
- Spencer Igo (Republican)
- Erin McCabe Ningen (DFL)

==== Results ====
District 7A general election
Party	Candidate	Votes	%
Republican	Spencer Igo	11,280	57.29%
Democratic (DFL)	Erin McCabe Ningen	8,401	42.67%
Write-in		9	0.05%
Total votes		19,690	100.00
Republican hold			

=== District 7B ===
Incumbent Republican Cal Warwas won the seat in 2024 with 56.34% of the vote.

==== Candidates ====
- Cal Warwas (Republican)
- Dan Horoshak (DFL)

==== Results ====
District 7B general election
Party	Candidate	Votes	%
Republican	Cal Warwas	10,866	53.66%
Democratic (DFL)	Dan Horoshak	9,373	46.29%
Write-in		11	0.05%
Total votes		20,250	100.00
Republican hold			

=== District 8A ===
Incumbent DFLer Peter Johnson won the open seat in 2024 with 68.22% of the vote.

==== Candidates ====
- Allan Kehr II (Republican)
- Peter Johnson (DFL)

==== Results ====
District 8A general election
Party	Candidate	Votes	%
Democratic (DFL)	Peter Johnson	14,302	75.76%
Republican	Allan Kehr II	4,551	24.11%
Write-in		24	0.13%
Total votes		18,877	100.00
Democratic (DFL) hold			

=== District 8B ===
Incumbent DFLer Liish Kozlowski was reelected in 2024 with 68.53% of the vote.

==== Candidates ====
- Shawn Savela (Republican)
- Liish Kozlowski (DFL)

==== Results ====
District 8B general election
Party	Candidate	Votes	%
Democratic (DFL)	Liish Kozlowski	17,100	75.76%
Republican	Shawn Savela	5,449	24.14%
Write-in		21	0.09%
Total votes		22,570	100.00
Democratic (DFL) hold			

=== District 9A ===
Incumbent Republican Jeff Backer was reelected in 2024 with 68.76% of the vote.

==== Candidates ====
- Jeff Backer (Republican)
- Nicholas Hanson (DFL)

==== Results ====
District 9A general election
Party	Candidate	Votes	%
Republican	Jeff Backer	12,404	64.26%
Democratic (DFL)	Nicholas Hanson	6,884	35.66%
Write-in		16	0.08%
Total votes		19,304	100.00
Republican hold			

=== District 9B ===
Incumbent Republican Tom Murphy was reelected in 2024 with 71.61% of the vote.

==== Candidates ====
- Craig Horlocker (Republican)
- Tom Murphy (Republican)
- Owen Werner (DFL)

==== Primary ====
District 9B Republican primary
Party	Candidate	Votes	%
Republican	Tom Murphy	4,733	88.55%
Republican	Craig Horlocker	612	11.45%
Total votes		5,345	100.00%

==== Results ====
District 9B general election
Party	Candidate	Votes	%
Republican	Tom Murphy	16,375	68.88%
Democratic (DFL)	Owen Werner	7,380	31.04%
Write-in		17	0.07%
Total votes		23,772	100.00
Republican hold			

=== District 10A ===
Incumbent Republican Ron Kresha, who was reelected in 2024 with 71.12% of the vote, retired.

==== Candidates ====
- Brian Lindquist (Republican)
- Mark Striemer (Republican)
- Melissa Maertens (DFL)

==== Primary ====
District 10A Republican primary
Party	Candidate	Votes	%
Republican	Mark Striemer	3,619	57.19%
Republican	Brian Lindquist	2,709	42.81%
Total votes		6,328	100.00%

==== Results ====
District 10A general election
Party	Candidate	Votes	%
Republican	Mark Striemer	14,459	68.13%
Democratic (DFL)	Melissa Maertens	6,731	31.72%
Write-in		32	0.15%
Total votes		21,222	100.00
Republican hold			

=== District 10B ===
Incumbent Republican Isaac Schultz was reelected in 2024 with 79.64% of the vote.

==== Candidates ====
- Isaac Schultz (Republican)
- Jeff Larson (DFL)

==== Results ====
District 10B general election
Party	Candidate	Votes	%
Republican	Isaac Schultz	16,286	77.37%
Democratic (DFL)	Jeff Larson	4,755	22.59%
Write-in		9	0.04%
Total votes		21,050	100.00
Republican hold			

=== District 11A ===
Incumbent Republican Jeff Dotseth was reelected in 2024 with 51.19% of the vote.

==== Candidates ====
- Jeff Dotseth (Republican)
- Chris Swanson (DFL)

==== Results ====
District 11A general election
Party	Candidate	Votes	%
Democratic (DFL)	Chris Swanson	11,403	55.57%
Republican	Jeff Dotseth	9,093	44.31%
Write-in		24	0.12%
Total votes		20,520	100.00
Democratic (DFL) gain from Republican			

=== District 11B ===
Incumbent Republican Nathan Nelson was reelected in 2024 with 68.62% of the vote.

==== Candidates ====
- Nathan Nelson (Republican)
- Jack L'Heureux (DFL)

==== Results ====
District 11B general election
Party	Candidate	Votes	%
Republican	Nathan Nelson	13,193	67.34%
Democratic (DFL)	Jack L'Heureux	6,385	32.59%
Write-in		14	0.07%
Total votes		19,592	100.00
Republican hold			

=== District 12A ===
Incumbent Republican Paul Anderson was reelected in 2024 with 73.80% of the vote.

==== Candidates ====
- Paul Anderson (Republican)
- Talitha Anderson (DFL)

==== Results ====
District 12A general election
Party	Candidate	Votes	%
Republican	Paul Anderson	14,398	71.67%
Democratic (DFL)	Talitha Anderson	5,679	28.27%
Write-in		12	0.06%
Total votes		20,089	100.00
Republican hold			

=== District 12B ===
Incumbent Republican Mary Franson was reelected in 2024 with 76.73% of the vote.

==== Candidates ====
- Mary Franson (Republican)
- Michael Gardner (DFL)

==== Results ====
District 12B general election
Party	Candidate	Votes	%
Republican	Mary Franson	14,647	67.86%
Democratic (DFL)	Michael Gardner	6,919	32.06%
Write-in		18	0.08%
Total votes		21,584	100.00
Republican hold			

=== District 13A ===
Incumbent Republican and incumbent Speaker of the House Lisa Demuth, who was reelected in 2024 with 75.30% of the vote, retired to run for governor.

==== Candidates ====
- Tanja Goering (Republican)
- Arlis Sayler (DFL)

==== Results ====
District 13A general election
Party	Candidate	Votes	%
Republican	Tanja Goering	16,222	71.60%
Democratic (DFL)	Arlis Sayler	6,423	28.35%
Write-in		11	0.05%
Total votes		22,656	100.00
Republican hold			

=== District 13B ===
Incumbent Republican Tim O'Driscoll, who was reelected in 2024 with 68.63% of the vote, retired.

==== Candidates ====
- Dawn Loberg (Republican)
- Justin Doyle (DFL)

==== Results ====
District 13B general election
Party	Candidate	Votes	%
Republican	Dawn Loberg	12,365	60.85%
Democratic (DFL)	Justin Doyle	7,946	39.10%
Write-in		9	0.04%
Total votes		20,320	100.00
Republican hold			

=== District 14A ===
Incumbent Republican Bernie Perryman, who was reelected in 2024 with 56.31% of the vote, retired to run for Minnesota Senate in District 14.

==== Candidates ====
- Mike Conway (Republican)
- John Jose (Republican)
- Abdi Daisane (DFL)
- Paul R. F. Schumacher (DFL)

==== Primary ====
District 14A Republican primary
Party	Candidate	Votes	%
Republican	Mike Conway	1,822	62.25%
Republican	John Jose	1,105	37.75%
Total votes		2,927	100.00%

District 14A DFL primary
Party	Candidate	Votes	%
Democratic (DFL)	Abdi Daisane	2,262	62.52%
Democratic (DFL)	Paul R. F. Schumacher	1,356	37.48%
Total votes		3,618	100.00%

==== Results ====
District 14A general election
Party	Candidate	Votes	%
Democratic (DFL)	Abdi Daisane	9,163	51.59%
Republican	Mike Conway	8,570	48.25%
Write-in		27	0.15%
Total votes		17,760	100.00
Democratic (DFL) gain from Republican			

=== District 14B ===
Incumbent DFLer Dan Wolgamott, who was reelected in 2024 with 50.36% of the vote, retired to run for state auditor.

==== Candidates ====
- Sue Ek (Republican)
- Zachary "Zach" Dorholt (DFL)

==== Results ====
District 14B general election
Party	Candidate	Votes	%
Democratic (DFL)	Zach Dorholt	9,896	56.88%
Republican	Sue Ek	7,480	42.99%
Write-in		22	0.13%
Total votes		17,398	100.00
Democratic (DFL) hold			

=== District 15A ===
Incumbent Republican Chris Swedzinski, who was reelected in 2024 with 71.68% of the vote, retired.

==== Candidates ====
- Bradley L Hennen (Republican)
- Nathan Schmig (DFL)

==== Results ====
District 15A general election
Party	Candidate	Votes	%
Republican	Bradley Hennen	12,374	66.04%
Democratic (DFL)	Nathan Schmig	6,350	33.89%
Write-in		13	0.07%
Total votes		18,737	100.00
Republican hold			

=== District 15B ===
Incumbent Republican Paul Torkelson, who was reelected in 2024 with 72.65% of the vote, retired.

==== Candidates ====
- Geri Theis (Republican)
- Keith R. Klawitter (DFL)
- Lydell Sik (DFL)

==== Primary ====
District 15B DFL primary
Party	Candidate	Votes	%
Democratic (DFL)	Keith R. Klawitter	2,017	80.87%
Democratic (DFL)	Lydell Sik	477	19.13%
Total votes		2,494	100.00%

==== Results ====
District 15B general election
Party	Candidate	Votes	%
Republican	Geri Theis	12,401	65.85%
Democratic (DFL)	Keith R. Klawitter	6,421	34.10%
Write-in		10	0.05%
Total votes		18,652	100.00
Republican hold			

=== District 16A ===
Incumbent Republican Scott Van Binsbergen won the open seat in 2024 with 71.60% of the vote.

==== Candidates ====
- Scott Van Binsbergen (Republican)
- David J Torgelson (DFL)

==== Results ====
District 16A general election
Party	Candidate	Votes	%
Republican	Scott Van Binsbergen	12,625	68.84%
Democratic (DFL)	David Torgelson	5,699	31.07%
Write-in		16	0.09%
Total votes		18,340	100.00
Republican hold			

=== District 16B ===
Incumbent Republican Dave Baker was reelected in 2024 with 76.10% of the vote.

==== Candidates ====
- Dave Baker (Republican)
- Julie Henslin (DFL)

==== Results ====
District 16B general election
Party	Candidate	Votes	%
Republican	Dave Baker	12,694	67.12%
Democratic (DFL)	Julie Henslin	6,207	32.82%
Write-in		10	0.05%
Total votes		18,911	100.00
Republican hold			

=== District 17A ===
Incumbent Republican Dawn Gillman was reelected in 2024 with 71.03% of the vote.

==== Candidates ====
- Dawn Gillman (Republican)
- Wayne Olson (Republican)
- Mali Anderson (DFL)

==== Primary ====
District 17A Republican primary
Party	Candidate	Votes	%
Republican	Dawn Gillman	3,089	77.48%
Republican	Wayne Olson	898	22.52%
Total votes		3,987	100.00%

==== Results ====
District 17A general election
Party	Candidate	Votes	%
Republican	Dawn Gillman	13,917	69.38%
Democratic (DFL)	Mali Anderson	6,123	30.53%
Write-in		18	0.09%
Total votes		20,058	100.00
Republican hold			

=== District 17B ===
Incumbent Republican Bobbie Harder was reelected in 2024 with 70.03% of the vote.

==== Candidates ====
- Bobbie Harder (Republican)
- Ben Wieman (DFL)

==== Results ====
District 17B general election
Party	Candidate	Votes	%
Republican	Bobbie Harder	14,782	66.90%
Democratic (DFL)	Ben Wieman	7,299	33.03%
Write-in		15	0.07%
Total votes		22,096	100.00
Republican hold			

=== District 18A ===
Incumbent Republican Erica Schwartz was elected in 2024 with 51.60% of the vote.

==== Candidates ====
- Erica Schwartz (Republican)
- Leah Hanson (DFL)

==== Results ====
District 18A general election
Party	Candidate	Votes	%
Democratic (DFL)	Leah Hanson	10,827	52.54%
Republican	Erica Schwartz	9,759	47.36%
Write-in		20	0.10%
Total votes		20,606	100.00
Democratic (DFL) gain from Republican			

=== District 18B ===
Incumbent DFLer Luke Frederick was reelected in 2024 with 55.64% of the vote.

==== Candidates ====
- Luke Frederick (DFL)

==== Results ====
District 18B general election
Party	Candidate	Votes	%
Democratic (DFL)	Luke Frederick	12,114	96.06%
Write-in		497	3.94%
Total votes		12,611	100.00
Democratic (DFL) hold			

=== District 19A ===
Incumbent Republican Keith Allen won the open seat in 2024 with 64.59% of the vote.

==== Candidates ====
- Keith Allen (Republican)
- Martha Brown (DFL)

==== Results ====
District 19A general election
Party	Candidate	Votes	%
Republican	Keith Allen	10,812	59.59%
Democratic (DFL)	Martha Brown	7,313	40.31%
Write-in		19	0.10%
Total votes		18,144	100.00
Republican hold			

=== District 19B ===
Incumbent Republican Thomas Sexton won the open seat in 2024 with 66.03% of the vote.

==== Candidates ====
- Thomas Sexton (Republican)
- Zack Meyman (DFL)

==== Results ====
District 19B general election
Party	Candidate	Votes	%
Republican	Thomas Sexton	11,394	59.15%
Democratic (DFL)	Zack Meyman	7,856	40.78%
Write-in		13	0.07%
Total votes		19,263	100.00
Republican hold			

=== District 20A ===
Incumbent Republican Pam Altendorf was reelected in 2024 with 57.60% of the vote.

==== Candidates ====
- Pam Altendorf (Republican)
- Heather Arndt (DFL)

==== Results ====
District 20A general election
Party	Candidate	Votes	%
Republican	Pam Altendorf	11,622	53.81%
Democratic (DFL)	Heather Arndt	9,962	46.12%
Write-in		14	0.06%
Total votes		21,598	100.00
Republican hold			

=== District 20B ===
Incumbent Republican Steven E. Jacob, who was reelected in 2024 with 66.85% of the vote, retired to run for Minnesota Senate in District 20.

==== Candidates ====
- Sara Bertschinger (Republican)
- Brady Rouhoff (Republican)
- Steve Holm (DFL)
- Mark Alvin Thoreson (DFL)

==== Primary ====
District 20B Republican primary
Party	Candidate	Votes	%
Republican	Sara Bertschinger	2,672	64.15%
Republican	Brady Rouhoff	1,493	35.85%
Total votes		4,165	100.00%

District 20B DFL primary
Party	Candidate	Votes	%
Democratic (DFL)	Steve Holm	1,877	73.90%
Democratic (DFL)	Mark Alvin Thoreson	663	26.10%
Total votes		2,540	100.00%

==== Results ====
District 20B general election
Party	Candidate	Votes	%
Republican	Sara Bertschinger	13,529	62.54%
Democratic (DFL)	Steve Holm	8,084	37.37%
Write-in		18	0.08%
Total votes		21,631	100.00
Republican hold			

=== District 21A ===
Incumbent Republican Joe Schomacker, who was reelected in 2024 with 83.89% of the vote, retired.

==== Candidates ====
- Krist Wollum (Republican)
- LS Rusty Nelson (DFL)

==== Results ====
District 21A general election
Party	Candidate	Votes	%
Republican	Krist Wollum	13,384	70.25%
Democratic (DFL)	LS Rusty Nelson	5,661	29.71%
Write-in		8	0.04%
Total votes		19,053	100.00
Republican hold			

=== District 21B ===
Incumbent Republican Marj Fogelman was reelected in 2024 with 66.30% of the vote.

==== Candidates ====
- Marj Fogelman (Republican)
- Jon Wilson (DFL)

==== Results ====
District 21B general election
Party	Candidate	Votes	%
Republican	Marj Fogelman	9,353	61.34%
Democratic (DFL)	Jon Wilson	5,887	38.61%
Write-in		7	0.05%
Total votes		15,247	100.00
Republican hold			

=== District 22A ===
Incumbent Republican Bjorn Olson was reelected in 2024 with 69.42% of the vote.

==== Candidates ====
- Bjorn Olson (Republican)
- Sonja L. Denn (DFL)

==== Results ====
District 22A general election
Party	Candidate	Votes	%
Republican	Bjorn Olson	12,450	67.07%
Democratic (DFL)	Sonja Denn	6,099	32.86%
Write-in		14	0.08%
Total votes		18,563	100.00
Republican hold			

=== District 22B ===
Incumbent Republican Terry Stier won the open seat in 2024 with 68.74% of the vote.

==== Candidates ====
- Terry Stier (Republican)
- Mary Nesgoda (DFL)

==== Results ====
District 22B general election
Party	Candidate	Votes	%
Republican	Terry Stier	14,102	66.41%
Democratic (DFL)	Mary Nesgoda	7,119	33.52%
Write-in		14	0.07%
Total votes		21,235	100.00
Republican hold			

=== District 23A ===
Incumbent Republican Peggy Bennett, who was reelected in 2024 with 67.75% of the vote, retired to run for governor.

==== Candidates ====
- Nick Ronnenberg (Republican)
- Colin J. Minehart (DFL)
- Joe Staloch (DFL)

==== Primary ====
District 23A DFL primary
Party	Candidate	Votes	%
Democratic (DFL)	Joe Staloch	2,095	76.66%
Democratic (DFL)	Colin J. Minehart	638	23.34%
Total votes		2,733	100.00%

==== Results ====
District 23A general election
Party	Candidate	Votes	%
Republican	Nick Ronnenberg	11,034	58.16%
Democratic (DFL)	Joe Staloch	7,914	41.72%
Write-in		23	0.12%
Total votes		18,971	100.00
Republican hold			

=== District 23B ===
Incumbent Republican Patricia Mueller was reelected in 2024 with 58.34% of the vote.

==== Candidates ====
- Patricia Mueller (Republican)
- Christoph Dundas (DFL)

==== Results ====
District 23B general election
Party	Candidate	Votes	%
Republican	Patricia Mueller	8,742	52.30%
Democratic (DFL)	Christoph Dundas	7,960	47.62%
Write-in		12	0.07%
Total votes		16,714	100.00
Republican hold			

=== District 24A ===
Incumbent Republican Duane Quam was reelected in 2024 with 63.40% of the vote.

==== Candidates ====
- Duane Quam (Republican)
- Heather Holmes (DFL)

==== Results ====
District 24A general election
Party	Candidate	Votes	%
Republican	Duane Quam	12,280	58.35%
Democratic (DFL)	Heather Holmes	8,754	41.60%
Write-in		11	0.05%
Total votes		21,045	100.00
Republican hold			

=== District 24B ===
Incumbent DFLer Tina Liebling was reelected in 2024 with 57.80% of the vote.

==== Candidates ====
- John Michael Ajouri (Republican)
- Tina Liebling (DFL)

==== Results ====
District 24B general election
Party	Candidate	Votes	%
Democratic (DFL)	Tina Liebling	12,849	63.07%
Republican	John Michael Ajouri	7,501	36.82%
Write-in		23	0.11%
Total votes		20,350	100.00
Democratic (DFL) hold			

=== District 25A ===
Incumbent DFLer Kim Hicks was reelected in 2024 with 55.98% of the vote.

==== Candidates ====
- Brad Trahan (Republican)
- Kim Hicks (DFL)

==== Results ====
District 25A general election
Party	Candidate	Votes	%
Democratic (DFL)	Kim Hicks	13,103	61.35%
Republican	Brad Trahan	8,243	38.59%
Write-in		12	0.06%
Total votes		21,358	100.00
Democratic (DFL) hold			

-->

=== District 25B ===
Incumbent DFLer Andy Smith was reelected in 2024 with 64.01% of the vote.

==== Candidates ====
- Wes Lund (Republican)
- Andy Smith (DFL)

==== Results ====
District 25B general election
Party	Candidate	Votes	%
Democratic (DFL)	Andy Smith	12,676	70.23%
Republican	Wes Lund	5,338	29.58%
Write-in		35	0.19%
Total votes		18,049	100.00
Democratic (DFL) hold			

=== District 26A ===
Incumbent Republican Aaron Repinski was elected in 2024 with 52.74% of the vote.

==== Candidates ====
- Aaron Repinski (Republican)
- Dan Wilson (DFL)

==== Results ====
District 26A general election
Party	Candidate	Votes	%
Democratic (DFL)	Dan Wilson	10,701	55.02%
Republican	Aaron Repinski	8,741	44.94%
Write-in		7	0.04%
Total votes		19,449	100.00
Democratic (DFL) gain from Republican			

=== District 26B ===
Incumbent Republican Greg Davids was reelected in 2024 with 63.32% of the vote.

==== Candidates ====
- Greg Davids (Republican)
- Allie Wolf (DFL)

==== Results ====
District 26B general election
Party	Candidate	Votes	%
Republican	Greg Davids	12,253	59.10%
Democratic (DFL)	Allie Wolf	8,438	40.70%
Write-in		40	0.19%
Total votes		20,731	100.00
Republican hold			

=== District 27A ===
Incumbent Republican Shane Mekeland was reelected in 2024 with 71.38% of the vote.

==== Candidates ====
- Shane Mekeland (Republican)
- Vanessa Davenport (DFL)

==== Results ====
District 27A general election
Party	Candidate	Votes	%
Republican	Shane Mekeland	14,084	67.86%
Democratic (DFL)	Vanessa Davenport	6,658	32.08%
Write-in		14	0.07%
Total votes		20,756	100.00
Republican hold			

=== District 27B ===
Incumbent Republican Bryan Lawrence was reelected in 2024 with 74.09% of the vote.

==== Candidates ====
- Bryan Lawrence (Republican)
- Charles McConaughay (DFL)

==== Results ====
District 27B general election
Party	Candidate	Votes	%
Republican	Bryan Lawrence	14,400	70.55%
Democratic (DFL)	Charles McConaughay	5,999	29.39%
Write-in		12	0.06%
Total votes		20,411	100.00
Republican hold			

=== District 28A ===
Incumbent Republican Jimmy Gordon won the open seat in 2024 with 68.11% of the vote.

==== Candidates ====
- James "Jimmy" Gordon (Republican)
- Tim Dummer (DFL)

==== Results ====
District 28A general election
Party	Candidate	Votes	%
Republican	Jimmy Gordon	13,570	63.71%
Democratic (DFL)	Tim Dummer	7,699	36.15%
Write-in		31	0.15%
Total votes		21,300	100.00
Republican hold			

=== District 28B ===
Incumbent Republican Max Rymer won the open seat in 2024 with 65.06% of the vote.

==== Candidates ====
- Max Rymer (Republican)
- Daniel Colten Schmidt (DFL)

==== Results ====
District 28B general election
Party	Candidate	Votes	%
Republican	Max Rymer	13,882	62.77%
Democratic (DFL)	Daniel Colten Schmidt	8,223	37.18%
Write-in		12	0.05%
Total votes		22,117	100.00
Republican hold			

=== District 29A ===
Incumbent Republican Joe McDonald was reelected in 2024 with 70.74% of the vote.

==== Candidates ====
- Joe McDonald (Republican)
- Emily Dahlgren (DFL)

==== Results ====
District 29A general election
Party	Candidate	Votes	%
Republican	Joe McDonald	15,580	67.47%
Democratic (DFL)	Emily Dahlgren	7,493	32.45%
Write-in		18	0.08%
Total votes		23,091	100.00
Republican hold			

=== District 29B ===
Incumbent Republican Marion (O'Neill) Rarick was reelected in 2024 with 66.46% of the vote.

==== Candidates ====
- Marion (O'Neill) Rarick (Republican)
- Marcus D. Claxton (DFL)
- Colton Kratky (DFL)

==== Primary ====
District 29B DFL primary
Party	Candidate	Votes	%
Democratic (DFL)	Colton Kratky	1,448	60.87%
Democratic (DFL)	Marcus D. Claxton	931	39.13%
Total votes		2,379	100.00%

==== Results ====
District 29B general election
Party	Candidate	Votes	%
Republican	Marion (O'Neill) Rarick	12,377	61.58%
Democratic (DFL)	Colton Kratky	7,708	38.35%
Write-in		14	0.07%
Total votes		20,099	100.00
Republican hold			

=== District 30A ===
Incumbent Republican Walter Hudson was reelected in 2024 with 62.74% of the vote.

==== Candidates ====
- Walter Hudson (Republican)
- Joey Smyth (DFL)

==== Results ====
District 30A general election
Party	Candidate	Votes	%
Republican	Walter Hudson	14,292	59.13%
Democratic (DFL)	Joey Smyth	9,864	40.81%
Write-in		13	0.05%
Total votes		24,169	100.00
Republican hold			

=== District 30B ===
Incumbent Republican Paul Novotny, who was reelected in 2024 with 65.87% of the vote, retired.

==== Candidates ====
- Chad Westberg (Republican)
- Keenan Gentry (DFL)

==== Results ====
District 30B general election
Party	Candidate	Votes	%
Republican	Chad Westberg	13,959	61.50%
Democratic (DFL)	Keenan Gentry	8,732	38.47%
Write-in		8	0.04%
Total votes		22,699	100.00
Republican hold			

=== District 31A ===
Incumbent Republican Harry Niska was reelected in 2024 with 61.11% of the vote.

==== Candidates ====
- Harry Niska (Republican)
- Brian Walker (DFL)

==== Results ====
District 31A general election
Party	Candidate	Votes	%
Republican	Harry Niska	12,303	55.08%
Democratic (DFL)	Brian Walker	10,014	44.84%
Write-in		18	0.08%
Total votes		22,335	100.00
Republican hold			

=== District 31B ===
Incumbent Republican Peggy Scott was reelected in 2024 with 70.49% of the vote.

==== Candidates ====
- Peggy Scott (Republican)
- Jen Bloomquist (DFL)

==== Results ====
District 31B general election
Party	Candidate	Votes	%
Republican	Peggy Scott	15,238	65.78%
Democratic (DFL)	Jen Bloomquist	7,907	34.13%
Write-in		19	0.08%
Total votes		23,164	100.00
Republican hold			

=== District 32A ===
Incumbent Republican Nolan West was reelected in 2024 with 58.15% of the vote. The result in 2026 was close enough for a state-funded recount, with West leading by 22 votes in initial results.

==== Candidates ====
- Nolan West (Republican)
- Amanda Matchett (DFL)

==== Results ====
District 32A general election
Party	Candidate	Votes	%
Republican	Nolan West	11,833	50.00%
Democratic (DFL)	Amanda Matchett	11,811	49.91%
Write-in		22	0.09%
Total votes		23,666	100.00
Republican hold			

=== District 32B ===
Incumbent DFLer Matt Norris was reelected in 2024 with 50.77% of the vote.

==== Candidates ====
- Leslie Larson (Republican)
- Matt Norris (DFL)

==== Results ====
District 32B general election
Party	Candidate	Votes	%
Democratic (DFL)	Matt Norris	12,026	57.24%
Republican	Leslie Larson	8,966	42.67%
Write-in		19	0.09%
Total votes		21,011	100.00
Democratic (DFL) hold			

=== District 33A ===
Incumbent Republican Patti Anderson, who was reelected in 2024 with 58.01% of the vote, retired.

==== Candidates ====
- Stacey Stout (Republican)
- Angela Thompson (DFL)

==== Results ====
District 33A general election
Party	Candidate	Votes	%
Republican	Stacey Stout	12,558	52.87%
Democratic (DFL)	Angela Thompson	11,180	47.07%
Write-in		13	0.05%
Total votes		23,751	100.00
Republican hold			

=== District 33B ===
Incumbent DFLer Josiah Hill was reelected in 2024 with 51.30% of the vote.

==== Candidates ====
- Jessica L. Johnson (Republican)
- Josiah Hill (DFL)

==== Results ====
District 33B general election
Party	Candidate	Votes	%
Democratic (DFL)	Josiah Hill	13,289	55.48%
Republican	Jessica L. Johnson	10,634	44.39%
Write-in		31	0.13%
Total votes		23,954	100.00
Democratic (DFL) hold			

=== District 34A ===
Incumbent Republican Danny Nadeau was reelected in 2024 with 53.48% of the vote.

==== Candidates ====
- Danny Nadeau (Republican)
- Jason Heaser (DFL)

==== Results ====
District 34A general election
Party	Candidate	Votes	%
Democratic (DFL)	Jason Heaser	13,897	51.95%
Republican	Danny Nadeau	12,836	47.98%
Write-in		19	0.07%
Total votes		26,752	100.00
Democratic (DFL) gain from Republican			

=== District 34B ===
Incumbent DFLer Melissa Hortman was reelected in 2024 with 63.08% of the vote. Following her death in June 2025, a special election was held on September 16, 2025. DFLer Xp Lee won that election with 59.15% of the vote.

==== Candidates ====
- Ruth Bittner (Republican)
- Xp Lee (DFL)

==== Results ====
District 34B general election
Party	Candidate	Votes	%
Democratic (DFL)	Xp Lee	13,531	67.63%
Republican	Ruth Bittner	6,450	32.24%
Write-in		25	0.12%
Total votes		20,006	100.00
Democratic (DFL) hold			

=== District 35A ===
Incumbent DFLer Zack Stephenson, the House DFL leader who succeeded Melissa Hortman after her assassination, won re-election in 2024 with 51.83% of the vote. He won re-election and was later elected the DFL's Speaker-designate for the following legislative session

==== Candidates ====
- Josh Jungling (Republican)
- Zack Stephenson (DFL)

==== Results ====
District 35A general election
Party	Candidate	Votes	%
Democratic (DFL)	Zack Stephenson	11,042	56.00%
Republican	Josh Jungling	8,654	43.89%
Write-in		23	0.12%
Total votes		19,719	100.00
Democratic (DFL) hold			

=== District 35B ===
Incumbent DFLer Kari Rehrauer won the open seat in 2024 with 50.51% of the vote.

==== Candidates ====
- Steve Pape (Republican)
- Kari Rehrauer (DFL)

==== Results ====
District 35B general election
Party	Candidate	Votes	%
Democratic (DFL)	Kari Rehrauer	11,021	55.82%
Republican	Steve Pape	8,702	44.08%
Write-in		20	0.10%
Total votes		19,743	100.00
Democratic (DFL) hold			

=== District 36A ===
Incumbent Republican Elliott Engen, who won re-election in 2024 with 54.06% of the vote, retired to run for State Auditor, changed his mind and filed for re-election, then withdrew his name before the deadline.

==== Candidates ====
- Sebastian Stoss (Republican)
- Jim DeMay (DFL)

==== Results ====
District 36A general election
Party	Candidate	Votes	%
Democratic (DFL)	Jim DeMay	13,189	52.31%
Republican	Sebastian Stoss	12,002	47.60%
Write-in		21	0.08%
Total votes		25,212	100.00
Democratic (DFL) gain from Republican			

=== District 36B ===
Incumbent DFLer Brion Curran won re-election in 2024 with 51.57% of the vote.

==== Candidates ====
- Patty Bradway (Republican)
- Brion Curran (DFL)

==== Results ====
District 36B general election
Party	Candidate	Votes	%
Democratic (DFL)	Brion Curran	13,267	58.16%
Republican	Patty Bradway	9,521	41.73%
Write-in		25	0.11%
Total votes		22,813	100.00
Democratic (DFL) hold			

=== District 37A ===
Incumbent Republican Kristin Robbins, who won re-election in 2024 with 57.12% of the vote, retired. She ran for governor, but withdrew before the primaries.

==== Candidates ====
- Tom McKee (Republican)
- Darci Smith (DFL)

==== Results ====
District 37A general election
Party	Candidate	Votes	%
Republican	Tom McKee	13,808	51.99%
Democratic (DFL)	Darci Smith	12,728	47.93%
Write-in		22	0.08%
Total votes		26,558	100.00
Republican hold			

=== District 37B ===
Incumbent DFLer Kristin Bahner won re-election in 2024 with 55.39% of the vote.

==== Candidates ====
- Luke Doerer (Republican)
- Kristin Bahner (DFL)

==== Results ====
District 37B general election
Party	Candidate	Votes	%
Democratic (DFL)	Kristin Bahner	15,055	60.95%
Republican	Luke Doerer	9,620	38.95%
Write-in		25	0.10%
Total votes		24,700	100.00
Democratic (DFL) hold			

=== District 38A ===
Incumbent DFLer Huldah Hiltsley won the open seat in 2024 with 64.78% of the vote.

==== Candidates ====
- Charlie Kistler (Republican)
- Yelena S. Kurdyumova (Republican)
- Richard A. Klatte (DFL)
- Huldah Momanyi-Hiltsley (DFL)
- Wynfred Russell (DFL)
- Yelena S. Kurdyumova (Declared write-in)

==== Primary ====
District 38A Republican primary
Party	Candidate	Votes	%
Republican	Charlie Kistler	979	90.23%
Republican	Yelena S. Kurdyumova	106	9.77%
Total votes		1,085	100.00%

District 38A DFL primary
Party	Candidate	Votes	%
Democratic (DFL)	Huldah Momanyi-Hiltsley	1,822	48.79%
Democratic (DFL)	Wynfred Russell	1,561	41.81%
Democratic (DFL)	Richard A. Klatte	351	9.40%
Total votes		3,734	100.00%

==== Results ====
District 38A general election
Party	Candidate	Votes	%
Democratic (DFL)	Huldah Momanyi-Hiltsley	9,852	71.80%
Republican	Charlie Kistler	3,840	27.99%
Write-in		29	0.21%
Total votes		13,713	100.00
Democratic (DFL) hold			

=== District 38B ===
Incumbent DFLer Samantha Vang won re-election in 2024 with 74.25% of the vote.

==== Candidates ====
- Robert Marvin (Republican)
- Samantha Vang (DFL)

==== Results ====
District 38B general election
Party	Candidate	Votes	%
Democratic (DFL)	Samantha Vang	10,794	79.12%
Republican	Robert Marvin	2,820	20.67%
Write-in		29	0.21%
Total votes		13,643	100.00
Democratic (DFL) hold			

=== District 39A ===
Incumbent DFLer Erin Koegel, who won re-election in 2024 with 63.33% of the vote, retired.

==== Candidates ====
- Andy Macko (Republican)
- Aaron Klemz (DFL)

==== Results ====
District 39A general election
Party	Candidate	Votes	%
Democratic (DFL)	Aaron Klemz	12,074	69.85%
Republican	Andy Macko	5,182	29.98%
Write-in		29	0.17%
Total votes		17,285	100.00
Democratic (DFL) hold			

=== District 39B ===
Incumbent DFLer Sandra Feist, who won re-election in 2024 with 70.91% of the vote, retired.

==== Candidates ====
- KT Jacobs (Republican)
- Amáda Márquez Simula (DFL)
- Justice Spriggs (DFL)

==== Primary ====
District 39B DFL primary
Party	Candidate	Votes	%
Democratic (DFL)	Amáda Márquez Simula	4,439	67.54%
Democratic (DFL)	Justice Spriggs	2,133	32.46%
Total votes		6,572	100.00%

==== Results ====
District 39B general election
Party	Candidate	Votes	%
Democratic (DFL)	Amáda Márquez Simula	14,638	75.95%
Republican	KT Jacobs	4,595	23.84%
Write-in		40	0.21%
Total votes		19,273	100.00
Democratic (DFL) hold			

=== District 40A ===
Incumbent DFLer Kelly Moller, who ran unopposed in 2024, retired.

==== Candidates ====
- Luis Withrow (Republican)
- Aisha Elmquist (DFL)
- Murwo S Mohamed (DFL)

==== Primary ====
District 40A DFL primary
Party	Candidate	Votes	%
Democratic (DFL)	Aisha Elmquist	5,601	92.73%
Democratic (DFL)	Murwo S Mohamed	439	7.27%
Total votes		6,040	100.00%

==== Results ====
District 40A general election
Party	Candidate	Votes	%
Democratic (DFL)	Aisha Elmquist	14,328	65.30%
Republican	Luis Withrow	7,597	34.62%
Write-in		17	0.08%
Total votes		21,942	100.00
Democratic (DFL) hold			

=== District 40B ===
DFL candidate Curtis Johnson won the 2024 election with 65.19% of the vote, but the result was invalidated on residency grounds before the legislative session began. David Gottfried (DFL) subsequently won the March 2025 special election and holds the seat heading into the 2026 election.

==== Candidates ====
- Allen Shen (Republican)
- David Gottfried (DFL)

==== Results ====
District 40B general election
Party	Candidate	Votes	%
Democratic (DFL)	David Gottfried	16,640	72.22%
Republican	Allen Shen	6,379	27.69%
Write-in		22	0.10%
Total votes		23,041	100.00
Democratic (DFL) hold			

=== District 41A ===
Incumbent Republican Wayne Johnson won the open seat in 2024 with 50.49% of the vote.

==== Candidates ====
- Wayne Johnson (Republican)
- Cole Birkeland (DFL)

==== Results ====
District 41A general election
Party	Candidate	Votes	%
Democratic (DFL)	Cole Birkeland	14,869	54.09%
Republican	Wayne Johnson	12,609	45.87%
Write-in		12	0.04%
Total votes		27,490	100.00
Democratic (DFL) gain from Republican			

=== District 41B ===
Incumbent Republican Tom Dippel, who won the open seat in 2024 with 50.94% of the vote, retired to run for the Minnesota Senate in District 41.

==== Candidates ====
- William Beck (Republican)
- Jen Fox (DFL)

==== Results ====
District 41B general election
Party	Candidate	Votes	%
Democratic (DFL)	Jen Fox	11,363	53.98%
Republican	William Beck	9,656	45.87%
Write-in		33	0.16%
Total votes		21,052	100.00
Democratic (DFL) gain from Republican			

=== District 42A ===
Incumbent DFLer Ned Carroll won re-election in 2024 with 57.30% of the vote.

==== Candidates ====
- Kathy Burkett (Republican)
- Ned Carroll (DFL)

==== Results ====
District 42A general election
Party	Candidate	Votes	%
Democratic (DFL)	Ned Carroll	14,054	62.21%
Republican	Kathy Burkett	8,529	37.75%
Write-in		10	0.04%
Total votes		22,593	100.00
Democratic (DFL) hold			

=== District 42B ===
Incumbent DFLer Ginny Klevorn won re-election in 2024 with 63.91% of the vote and won unopposed in 2026.

==== Candidates ====
- Ginny Klevorn (DFL)

==== Results ====
District 42B general election
Party	Candidate	Votes	%
Democratic (DFL)	Ginny Klevorn	16,239	95.00%
Write-in		854	5.00%
Total votes		17,093	100.00
Democratic (DFL) hold			

=== District 43A ===
Incumbent DFLer Cedrick Frazier, who won re-election in 2024 with 66.33% of the vote, retired to run for Hennepin County Attorney.

==== Candidates ====
- Todd Hesemann (Republican)
- Kyrstin Schuette (DFL)

==== Results ====
District 43A general election
Party	Candidate	Votes	%
Democratic (DFL)	Kyrstin Schuette	13,666	71.35%
Republican	Todd Hesemann	5,456	28.49%
Write-in		31	0.16%
Total votes		19,153	100.00
Democratic (DFL) hold			

=== District 43B ===
Incumbent DFLer Mike Freiberg, who won re-election in 2024 with 75.19% of the vote, retired to run for Minnesota Senate in District 43.

==== Candidates ====
- Jess Lewis (DFL)

==== Results ====
District 43B general election
Party	Candidate	Votes	%
Democratic (DFL)	Jess Lewis	18,834	97.67%
Write-in		449	2.33%
Total votes		19,283	100.00
Democratic (DFL) hold			

=== District 44A ===
Incumbent DFLer Peter Fischer was reelected in 2024 with 62.37% of the vote. In 2026, he Fischer was reelected again, increasing his vote share to 69.98%.

==== Candidates ====
- Justin Middaugh (Republican)
- Peter Fischer (DFL)

==== Results ====
District 44A general election
Party	Candidate	Votes	%
Democratic (DFL)	Peter Fischer	12,235	69.98%
Republican	Justin Middaugh	5,229	29.91%
Write-in		19	0.11%
Total votes		17,483	100.00
Democratic (DFL) hold			

=== District 44B ===
Incumbent DFLer Leon Lillie was reelected in 2024 with 56.35% of the vote. In 2026, Lillie won and increased his margin by ten percentage points.

==== Candidates ====
- Leon Lillie (DFL)
- TJ Hawthorne (Independent)

==== Results ====
District 44B general election
Party	Candidate	Votes	%
Democratic (DFL)	Leon Lillie	12,603	66.60%
Independent	TJ Hawthorne	6,251	33.03%
Write-in		69	0.36%
Total votes			100.00
Democratic (DFL) hold			

=== District 45A ===
Incumbent Republican Andrew Myers was reelected in 2024 with 55.02% of the vote. He held onto his seat with 52.37% of votes in 2026.

==== Candidates ====
- Andrew Myers (Republican)
- Tracey Breazeale (DFL)

==== Results ====
District 45A general election
Party	Candidate	Votes	%
Republican	Andrew Myers	13,546	52.37%
Democratic (DFL)	Tracey Breazeale	12,304	47.57%
Write-in		14	0.05%
Total votes		25,864	100.00
Republican hold			

=== District 45B ===
Incumbent DFLer Patty Acomb ran unopposed in 2024, winning with 95.18% of the vote. She was reelected in 2026 with 64.93% of the vote.

==== Candidates ====
- Thomas Bergerson (Republican)
- Patty Acomb (DFL)

==== Results ====
District 45B general election
Party	Candidate	Votes	%
Democratic (DFL)	Patty Acomb	16,611	64.93%
Republican	Thomas Bergerson	8,950	34.99%
Write-in		20	0.08%
Total votes		25,581	100.00
Democratic (DFL) hold			

=== District 46A ===
Incumbent DFLer Larry Kraft was reelected in 2024 with 75.02% of the vote. His 2026 reelection increased his vote share to 81.64%.

==== Candidates ====
- Karl Olson (Republican)
- Larry Kraft (DFL)

==== Results ====
District 46A general election
Party	Candidate	Votes	%
Democratic (DFL)	Larry Kraft	18,893	81.64%
Republican	Karl Olson	4,224	18.25%
Write-in		25	0.11%
Total votes		23,142	100.00
Democratic (DFL) hold			

=== District 46B ===
Incumbent DFLer Cheryl Youakim won re-election in 2024 with 67.62% of the vote.

==== Candidates ====
- Kim Rich (Republican)
- Cheryl Youakim (DFL)

==== Results ====
District 46B general election
Party	Candidate	Votes	%
Democratic (DFL)	Cheryl Youakim	16,896	72.88%
Republican	Kim Rich	6,264	27.02%
Write-in		24	0.10%
Total votes		23,184	100.00
Democratic (DFL) hold			

=== District 47A ===
Incumbent DFLer Amanda Hemmingsen-Jaeger won re-election in 2024 with 60.62% of the vote. Hemmingsen-Jaeger ran for, and was elected to, the state senate in a special election in 2025, leaving a vacancy.

Shelley Buck won the January 2026 special election to fill the seat. After winning the special primary election, Buck won unopposed in both the January 2026 special election and the November 2026 general election.

==== Candidates ====
- Shelley Buck (DFL)

==== Results ====
District 47A general election
Party	Candidate	Votes	%
Democratic (DFL)	Shelley Buck	15,179	95.68%
Write-in		686	4.32%
Total votes		15,865	100.00
Democratic (DFL) hold			

=== District 47B ===
Incumbent DFLer Ethan Cha won re-election in 2024 with 54.41% of the vote.

==== Candidates ====
- Ethan Cha (DFL)
- Kim Wilson (Independent)

==== Results ====
District 47B general election
Party	Candidate	Votes	%
Democratic (DFL)	Ethan Cha	14,362	61.56%
Independent	Kim Wilson	8,903	38.16%
Write-in		65	0.28%
Total votes		23,330	100.00
Democratic (DFL) hold			

=== District 48A ===
Incumbent Republican Jim Nash won re-election in 2024 with 60.41% of the vote.

==== Candidates ====
- Jim Nash (Republican)
- Joe Brothers (DFL)

==== Results ====
District 48A general election
Party	Candidate	Votes	%
Republican	Jim Nash	14,343	55.22%
Democratic (DFL)	Joe Brothers	11,610	44.70%
Write-in		21	0.08%
Total votes		25,974	100.00
Republican hold			

=== District 48B ===
Incumbent DFLer Lucy Rehm won re-election in 2024 with 50.39% of the vote.

==== Candidates ====
- Caleb Steffenhagen (Republican)
- Lucy Rehm (DFL)

==== Results ====
District 48B general election
Party	Candidate	Votes	%
Democratic (DFL)	Lucy Rehm	12,655	54.90%
Republican	Caleb Steffenhagen	10,385	45.05%
Write-in		13	0.06%
Total votes		23,053	100.00
Democratic (DFL) hold			

=== District 49A ===
Incumbent DFLer Alex Falconer won the open seat in 2024 with 60.81% of the vote.

==== Candidates ====
- Jeff Houdek (Republican)
- Alex Falconer (DFL)

==== Results ====
District 49A general election
Party	Candidate	Votes	%
Democratic (DFL)	Alex Falconer	16,254	66.16%
Republican	Jeff Houdek	8,297	33.77%
Write-in		17	0.07%
Total votes		24,568	100.00
Democratic (DFL) hold			

=== District 49B ===
Incumbent DFLer Carlie Kotyza-Witthuhn won re-election in 2024 with 57.11% of the vote.

==== Candidates ====
- Wendy Cregg (Republican)
- Carlie Kotyza-Witthuhn (DFL)

==== Results ====
District 49B general election
Party	Candidate	Votes	%
Democratic (DFL)	Carlie Kotyza-Witthuhn	13,844	62.49%
Republican	Wendy Cregg	8,297	37.45%
Write-in		14	0.06%
Total votes		22,155	100.00
Democratic (DFL) hold			

=== District 50A ===
Incumbent DFLer Julie Greene won the open seat in 2024 with 64.57% of the vote.

==== Candidates ====
- Chris Wedum (Republican)
- Julie Greene (DFL)

==== Results ====
District 50A general election
Party	Candidate	Votes	%
Democratic (DFL)	Julie Greene	17,025	69.79%
Republican	Chris Wedum	7,354	30.15%
Write-in		16	0.07%
Total votes		24,395	100.00
Democratic (DFL) hold			

=== District 50B ===
Incumbent DFLer Steve Elkins won re-election in 2024 with 63.18% of the vote. He won an unopposed election in 2026.

==== Candidates ====
- Steve Elkins (DFL)

==== Results ====
District 50B general election
Party	Candidate	Votes	%
Democratic (DFL)	Steve Elkins	17,829	95.81%
Write-in		780	4.19%
Total votes		18,609	100.00
Democratic (DFL) hold			

=== District 51A ===
Incumbent DFLer Michael Howard won re-election in 2024 with 73.44% of the vote.

==== Candidates ====
- Frank Pafko (Republican)
- Michael Howard (DFL)

==== Results ====
District 51A general election
Party	Candidate	Votes	%
Democratic (DFL)	Michael Howard	15,841	79.24%
Republican	Frank Pafko	4,117	20.59%
Write-in		34	0.17%
Total votes		19,992	100.00
Democratic (DFL) hold			

=== District 51B ===
Incumbent DFLer Nathan Coulter won re-election in 2024 with 64.08% of the vote.

==== Candidates ====
- Jim Lund (Republican)
- Nathan Coulter (DFL)

==== Results ====
District 51B general election
Party	Candidate	Votes	%
Democratic (DFL)	Nathan Coulter	13,883	70.09%
Republican	Jim Lund	5,899	29.78%
Write-in		26	0.13%
Total votes		19,808	100.00
Democratic (DFL) hold			

=== District 52A ===
Incumbent DFLer Liz Reyer, who won re-election in 2024 with 60.88% of the vote, retired to run for Minnesota Senate in District 52. Christos Jensen (DFL) won the seat by a 37-point margin.

==== Candidates ====
- George Gilmour (Republican)
- Christos Jensen (DFL)

==== Results ====
District 52A general election
Party	Candidate	Votes	%
Democratic (DFL)	Christos Jensen	14,208	68.55%
Republican	George Gilmour	6,503	31.38%
Write-in		15	0.07%
Total votes		20,726	100.00
Democratic (DFL) hold			

=== District 52B ===
Incumbent DFLer Bianca Virnig won re-election in 2024 with 60.57% of the vote.

==== Candidates ====
- Tom Lopac (Republican)
- Bianca Virnig (DFL)

==== Results ====
District 52B general election
Party	Candidate	Votes	%
Democratic (DFL)	Bianca Virnig	15,899	65.52%
Republican	Tom Lopac	8,354	34.43%
Write-in		14	0.06%
Total votes		24,267	100.00
Democratic (DFL) hold			

=== District 53A ===
Incumbent DFLer Mary Frances Clardy won re-election in 2024 with 57.73% of the vote.

==== Candidates ====
- AJ Gubash (Republican)
- Mary Frances Clardy (DFL)

==== Results ====
District 53A general election
Party	Candidate	Votes	%
Democratic (DFL)	Mary Frances Clardy	14,233	63.01%
Republican	AJ Gubash	8,338	36.91%
Write-in		17	0.08%
Total votes		22,588	100.00
Democratic (DFL) hold			

=== District 53B ===
Incumbent DFLer Rick Hansen was reelected with 64.15% of the vote. In 2024, he was re-elected with a 59.37% vote share.

==== Candidates ====
- Patti Mikulski (Republican)
- Rick Hansen (DFL)

==== Results ====
District 53B general election
Party	Candidate	Votes	%
Democratic (DFL)	Rick Hansen	12,683	64.15%
Republican	Patti Mikulski	7,068	35.75%
Write-in		20	0.10%
Total votes		19,771	100.00
Democratic (DFL) hold			

=== District 54A ===
Incumbent DFLer Brad Tabke, who won re-election in 2024 by a 15-vote margin (with 49.95% of the vote), increased his lead to 14.3 percentage points.

==== Candidates ====
- Aaron Paul (Republican)
- Brad Tabke (DFL)

==== Results ====
District 54A general election
Party	Candidate	Votes	%
Democratic (DFL)	Brad Tabke	11,938	57.09%
Republican	Aaron Paul	8,937	42.74%
Write-in		35	0.17%
Total votes			100.00
hold			

=== District 54B ===
Incumbent Republican Ben Bakeberg, who won re-election in 2024 with 61.94% of the vote, retired to run for Minnesota Senate in District 54. Republican Natalie Barnes won in 2026.

==== Candidates ====
- Natalie Barnes (Republican)
- Chris Steward (Republican)
- Christopher Kartschoke (DFL)

==== Primary ====
District 54B Republican primary
Party	Candidate	Votes	%
Republican	Natalie Barnes	2,486	66.65%
Republican	Chris Steward	1,244	33.35%
Total votes		3,730	100.00%

==== Results ====
District 54B general election
Party	Candidate	Votes	%
Republican	Natalie Barnes	12,972	55.69%
Democratic (DFL)	Christopher Kartschoke	10,307	44.25%
Write-in		13	0.06%
Total votes		23,292	100.00
Republican hold			

=== District 55A ===
Incumbent DFLer Jessica Hanson was reelected with 57.93% of the vote in 2026. In her 2024 reelection, she won 53.33% of the vote.

==== Candidates ====
- Pam Myhra (Republican)
- Jessica Hanson (DFL)

==== Results ====
District 55A general election
Party	Candidate	Votes	%
Democratic (DFL)	Jessica Hanson	12,189	57.93%
Republican	Pam Myhra	8,833	41.98%
Write-in		20	0.10%
Total votes		21,042	100.00
Democratic (DFL) hold			

=== District 55B ===
Incumbent DFLer Kaela Berg, who won re-election in 2024 with 59.24% of the vote, retired to run for the U.S. House of Representatives. Hunter Cantrell, who previously represented District 59A in the House for the 2019-2020 session, was elected to fill the seat.

==== Candidates ====
- Todd Buchwald (Republican)
- Hunter Cantrell (DFL)
- Kriystauhl Fitchett (DFL)
- Yusuf Haji (DFL)
- Adam Silkey (DFL)

==== Primary ====
District 55B DFL primary
Party	Candidate	Votes	%
Democratic (DFL)	Hunter Cantrell	3,051	61.14%
Democratic (DFL)	Adam Silkey	674	13.51%
Democratic (DFL)	Yusuf Haji	646	12.95%
Democratic (DFL)	Kriystauhl Fitchett	619	12.40%
Total votes		4,990	100.00%

==== Results ====
District 55B general election
Party	Candidate	Votes	%
Democratic (DFL)	Hunter Cantrell	12,388	66.36%
Republican	Todd Buchwald	6,271	33.59%
Write-in		9	0.05%
Total votes		18,668	100.00
Democratic (DFL) hold			

=== District 56A ===
Incumbent DFLer Robert Bierman won re-election in 2024 with 61.22% of the vote.

==== Candidates ====
- A.J. Prospect (Republican)
- Robert Bierman (DFL)

==== Results ====
District 56A general election
Party	Candidate	Votes	%
Democratic (DFL)	Robert Bierman	13,895	67.14%
Republican	A.J. Prospect	6,784	32.78%
Write-in		18	0.09%
Total votes		20,697	100.00
Democratic (DFL) hold			

=== District 56B ===
Incumbent DFLer John Huot was reelected with 60.74% of the vote. He won 55.97% of the vote in 2024.

==== Candidates ====
- Andrew Hattaway (Republican)
- John Huot (DFL)

==== Results ====
District 56B general election
Party	Candidate	Votes	%
Democratic (DFL)	John Huot	14,839	60.74%
Republican	Andrew Hattaway	9,578	39.20%
Write-in		14	0.06%
Total votes		24,431	100.00
Democratic (DFL) hold			

=== District 57A ===
Incumbent Republican Jon Koznick was reelected with 58.22% of the vote. He took 62.55% of the vote in 2024.

==== Candidates ====
- Jon Koznick (Republican)
- JD Delgado (DFL)

==== Results ====
District 57A general election
Party	Candidate	Votes	%
Republican	Jon Koznick	13,885	58.22%
Democratic (DFL)	JD Delgado	9,952	41.73%
Write-in		11	0.05%
Total votes		23,848	100.00
Republican hold			

=== District 57B ===
DFL candidate Brian Cohn won over incumbent Republican Jeff Witte by a 7.87-point margin. Witte had been reelected in 2024, beating Cohn with 52.35% of the vote.

==== Candidates ====
- Jeff Witte (Republican)
- Brian Cohn (DFL)

==== Results ====
District 57B general election
Party	Candidate	Votes	%
Democratic (DFL)	Brian Cohn	13,284	53.89%
Republican	Jeff Witte	11,343	46.02%
Write-in		21	0.09%
Total votes		24,648	100.00
Democratic (DFL) gain from Republican			

=== District 58A ===
Incumbent DFLer Kristi Pursell won re-election in 2024 with 52.43% of the vote.

==== Candidates ====
- Steven E. Cherney (Republican)
- Kristi Pursell (DFL)

=== District 58B ===
Incumbent Republican Drew Roach won the open seat in 2024 with 59.84% of the vote.

==== Candidates ====
- Drew Roach (Republican)
- Ed Fellows (DFL)

=== District 59A ===
Incumbent DFLer Fue Lee ran unopposed in 2024, winning with 97.93% of the vote.

==== Candidates ====
- Fue Lee (DFL)

=== District 59B ===
Incumbent DFLer Esther Agbaje won re-election in 2024 with 82.34% of the vote.

==== Candidates ====
- Kenneth Smoron (Republican)
- Esther Agbaje (DFL)

=== District 60A ===
Incumbent DFLer Sydney Jordan won re-election in 2024 with 84.59% of the vote.

==== Candidates ====
- John Holmberg (Republican)
- Sydney Jordan (DFL)

=== District 60B ===
Incumbent DFLer Mohamud Noor won re-election in 2024 with 82.70% of the vote.

==== Candidates ====
- Abdurrahman Mahmud (DFL)
- Mohamud Noor (DFL)

==== Primary ====
District 60B DFL primary
Party	Candidate	Votes	%
Democratic (DFL)	Mohamud Noor	3,381	84.63%
Democratic (DFL)	Abdurrahman Mahmud	614	15.37%
Total votes		3,995	100.00%

=== District 61A ===
Incumbent DFLer Katie Jones won the open seat in 2024 with 83.92% of the vote.

==== Candidates ====
- Katie Jones (DFL)

=== District 61B ===
Incumbent DFLer Jamie Long won re-election in 2024 with 89.09% of the vote.

==== Candidates ====
- Jamie Long (DFL)

=== District 62A ===
Incumbent DFLer Aisha Gomez won re-election in 2024 with 90.07% of the vote.

==== Candidates ====
- Aisha Gomez (DFL)

=== District 62B ===
Incumbent DFLer Anquam Mahamoud won the open seat in 2024 with 87.23% of the vote.

==== Candidates ====
- Bob Sullentrop (Republican)
- Anquam Mahamoud (DFL)

=== District 63A ===
Incumbent DFLer Samantha Sencer-Mura ran unopposed in 2024, winning with 98.76% of the vote.

==== Candidates ====
- Kyle Bragg (Republican)
- Samantha Sencer-Mura (DFL)

=== District 63B ===
Incumbent DFLer Emma Greenman won re-election in 2024 with 85.27% of the vote.

==== Candidates ====
- Nicholas Peters (Republican)
- Emma Greenman (DFL)

=== District 64A ===
Incumbent DFLer Kaohly Vang Her won re-election in 2024 with 83.17% of the vote. After Her was elected mayor of St. Paul in 2025, a January 2026 special election was held to fill her seat, and Meg Luger-Nikolai (DFL) was elected.

Luger-Nikolai was unopposed in the 2026 general election.

==== Candidates ====
- Meg Luger-Nikolai (DFL)

==== Results ====
District 64A general election
Party	Candidate	Votes	%
Democratic (DFL)	Meg Luger-Nikolai	19,567	98.59%
Write-in		280	1.41%
Total votes		19,847	100.00
Democratic (DFL) hold			

=== District 64B ===
Incumbent DFLer Dave Pinto won re-election in 2024 with 80.10% of the vote.

==== Candidates ====
- Dave Pinto (DFL)

=== District 65A ===
Incumbent DFLer Samakab Hussein ran unopposed in 2024, winning with 97.07% of the vote.

==== Candidates ====
- Samakab Hussein (DFL)

=== District 65B ===
Incumbent DFLer María Isa Pérez-Vega, who won re-election in 2024 with 76.51% of the vote, retired to run for the Ramsey County Commission.

==== Candidates ====
- Sebastian Ellefson (DFL)
- Elena Mena (DFL)

==== Primary ====
District 65B DFL primary
Party	Candidate	Votes	%
Democratic (DFL)	Sebastian Ellefson	3,696	58.69%
Democratic (DFL)	Elena Mena	2,602	41.31%
Total votes		6,298	100.00%

=== District 66A ===
Incumbent DFLer Leigh Finke won re-election in 2024 with 80.99% of the vote.

==== Candidates ====
- Mark Born (Republican)
- Leigh Finke (DFL)

=== District 66B ===
Incumbent DFLer Athena Hollins won re-election in 2024 with 76.12% of the vote.

==== Candidates ====
- Mary O'Neal (Republican)
- Athena Hollins (DFL)

=== District 67A ===
Incumbent DFLer Liz Lee won re-election in 2024 with 73.96% of the vote.

==== Candidates ====
- Jennifer McPherson (Republican)
- Liz Lee (DFL)

=== District 67B ===
Incumbent DFLer Jay Xiong won re-election in 2024 with 74.70% of the vote.

==== Candidates ====
- Jay Xiong (DFL)

== Special elections ==
=== House district 47A special election ===
A special election was held on January 27, 2026, for House District 47A, in which Shelley Buck won the general election unopposed.

District 47A is in the Saint Paul suburbs of Woodbury and Maplewood. The seat was vacated on November 18, 2025 by the resignation of Amanda Hemmingsen-Jaeger after her election to the Minnesota Senate. In 2024, Hemmingsen-Jaeger carried the seat by 21 points.

Only Democratic-Farmer-Labor candidates filed for office. Shelley Buck, a longtime leader of the Prairie Island Indian Community tribal council, won the DFL nomination in the special primary election on December 16, 2025 with 87.54% of the vote. She carried the general election unopposed, winning 97.55% of votes.

House District 47A special DFL primary
Party	Candidate	Votes	%
Democratic (DFL)	Shelley Buck	815	87.54%
Democratic (DFL)	Juli Servatius	41	4.40%
Democratic (DFL)	David Azcona	75	8.06%

House District 47A special election
Party	Candidate	Votes	%
Democratic (DFL)	Shelley Buck	1,913	97.55%
Write-in		48	2.45%

=== House district 64A special election ===
A special election was also held on January 27, 2026, for House District 64A in Saint Paul. Meg Luger-Nikolai won the seat against Republican Dan Walsh with 95.28% of the vote.

The seat was vacated on November 18, 2025 by the resignation of Kaohly Her after her election as Mayor of Saint Paul. The district sits south of I-94 and east of I-35E in Saint Paul, spanning the neighborhoods of Union Park, Summit-University, Macalester-Groveland, and Summit Hill.

Six DFL candidates and one Republican candidate filed for the seat. In the DFL primary on December 16, 2025, Meg Luger-Nikolai, a labor lawyer for Education Minnesota, won with 29.91% of the vote, 155 votes ahead of candidate Dan McGrath. She faced Republican Dan Walsh, a small business owner, in the general election. Luger-Nikolai was endorsed by the DFL prior to the primary election.

In 2024, Her defeated Walsh with 83% of the vote. In the special election, Luger-Nikolai took 95.28% of the vote, a 12-point swing towards the DFL.

House District 64A special DFL primary
Party	Candidate	Votes	%
Democratic (DFL)	Meg Luger-Nikolai	1,364	29.91%
Democratic (DFL)	Dan McGrath	1,209	26.51%
Democratic (DFL)	Lois Quam	986	21.62%
Democratic (DFL)	Beth Fraser	686	15.04%
Democratic (DFL)	Matt Hill	255	5.59%
Democratic (DFL)	John Zwier	60	1.32%

House District 64A special election
Party	Candidate	Votes	%	±%
Democratic (DFL)	Meg Luger-Nikolai	5,557	95.28%	+12.11
Republican	Dan Walsh	254	4.36%	−12.24
Write-in		21	0.36%	+0.13
