= Abdi Daisane =

American politician

Member-elect of the Minnesota House of Representatives from the 14A district
- Assuming office January 2027
- Succeeding: Bernie Perryman

Personal details
- Party: Democratic

Abdi Daisane (born 1987/1988) is an American politician who is the Democratic member-elect of the Minnesota House of Representatives from district 14A. Before his election, he was a childcare business founder and entrepreneurship consultant.

== Biography ==
=== Early life and business career ===
Daisane was born in 1987/1988 in Somalia. The country was in a civil war at the time, and he lived in a Kenyan refugee camp for 18 years. He emigrated to the United States in the late 2000s or early 2010s; originally living in Nebraska, he later moved to St. Cloud, Minnesota. and got a master's degree in public administration from St. Cloud State University (SCSU). While at SCSU, he co-founded a company to help college students with things like paperwork and exams.

In 2017, Daisane founded Blooming Kids Child Care Center, a childcare business in St. Cloud. The Minnesota Department of Human Services found violations at the center, including supervision problems, background-study lapses, violations of infant-sleeping rules, discipline-related issues, staff training gaps, missing qualification documents, medical record issues, and equipment problems, starting in 2021 and continuing through October 2026. Daisane also co-founded a nonprofit to recruit low-income college students, and was an Initiative Foundation Enterprise Academy Program Officer. In 2021, he was named to the St. Cloud Times/Local iQ 5 Under 40 Class of 2020. He is also an entrepreneurship consultant, including with Minnesota's Somali community. After a right-wing YouTuber posted a video alleging fraud at Somali-American daycare centers, Daisane and other Blooming Kids staff were harassed.

=== Political career ===
In 2016, Daisane ran for a seat on the St. Cloud City Council; he said that this experience allowed him "to shed light on some important issues". He ran in the 2024 Minnesota House of Representatives election for district 14A, losing to Republican incumbent Bernie Perryman.

Daisane ran in district 14A again in the 2026 election. He won the Democratic-Farmer-Labor primary, defeating R. F. Schumacher, 63% to 37%. He won the general election in November 2026, defeating the Republican nominee, St. Cloud City Council president Mike Conway. He is the first Somali-American legislator elected from the St. Cloud area.
