= Klemz =

Klemz is a surname, and may refer to:

- Aaron Klemz, American politician
- Arja Klemz, Finnish speed skater

== See also ==
- Klemzig
