= Elmquist =

Elmquist is a Swedish surname. Notable people with the surname include:

- Aisha Elmquist, American politician
- Bjørn Elmquist, Danish politician and lawyer
- Brian Elmquist, American band
- Rune Elmquist, Swedish inventor, physician and cardiac surgeon

== See also ==
- Elfquest
