= Sara Bertschinger =

American politician

Member-elect of the Minnesota House of Representatives from the 20B district
- Assuming office January 12, 2027
- Succeeding: Steven Jacob

Personal details
- Party: Republican
- Education: Rochester Community College
- Website: bertschingerforhouse.com

Sara Bertschinger is an American politician who is the representative-elect for district 20B in the Minnesota House of Representatives. A member of the Minnesota Republican Party, she was elected in 2026. Bertschinger is active in church ministry and serves as an event coordinator for a statewide nonprofit. She is a nurse. She supports term limits.
