= Jason Heaser =

American politician

Member-elect of the Minnesota House of Representatives from the 34A district
- Assuming office January 12, 2027
- Succeeding: Danny Nadeau

Personal details
- Party: Democratic
- Education: Kansas State University; University of Notre Dame
- Website: www.heaserforhouse.com

Jason Heaser is an American politician who is the representative-elect for district 34A in the Minnesota House of Representatives. A member of the Minnesota Democratic–Farmer–Labor Party, he was elected in 2026, unseating incumbent Republican Danny Nadeau. Heaser is a prosecutor and veteran of the United States Army from the Twin Cities area.
