= Geri Theis =

American politician

Member-elect of the Minnesota House of Representatives from the 15B district
- Assuming office January 12, 2027
- Succeeding: Paul Torkelson

Personal details
- Party: Republican
- Website: theisforhouse.com

Geri Theis is an American politician who is the representative-elect for district 15B in the Minnesota House of Representatives. A member of the Minnesota Republican Party, she was elected in 2026. Theis is a business owner, broker, and community leader from Redwood Falls, Minnesota.
