= Tanja Goering =

American politician

Member-elect of the Minnesota House of Representatives from the 13A district
- Assuming office January 12, 2027
- Succeeding: Lisa Demuth

Personal details
- Party: Republican
- Website: tanjagoeringformn.com

Tanja Goering is an American politician who is the representative-elect for district 13A in the Minnesota House of Representatives. A member of the Minnesota Republican Party, she was elected in 2026. Goering is a former St. Cloud Chamber of Commerce board chair.
