= Dan Wilson (Minnesota politician) =

- Wilson campaigning in 2026

Member-elect of the Minnesota House of Representatives from the 26A district
- Assuming office January 4, 2027
- Succeeding: Aaron Repinski

Personal details
- Born: March 1988 (age 38)
- Party: Democratic (DFL)
- Occupation: Farmer; politician

Dan Wilson is an American politician who is the member-elect for district 26A in the Minnesota House of Representatives. He is a member of the Minnesota Democratic-Farmer-Labor Party.

Wilson was born in March 1988. In 2022, he ran unsuccessfully against State Senator Jeremy Miller. Before his election in 2026, Wilson was a farmer in rural Winona County. He campaigned on housing, childcare, grocery prices, and health insurance. He has lived in Winona County since 2006.
