= Jess Lewis (politician) =

American politician

Member-elect of the Minnesota House of Representatives from the 43B district
- Assuming office January 12, 2027
- Succeeding: Mike Freiberg

Personal details
- Party: Democratic
- Website: www.votejesslewis.com

Jess Lewis is an American politician of the Minnesota Democratic–Farmer–Labor Party who is the representative-elect for district 43B in the Minnesota House of Representatives. She was elected at the 2026 election. She is a scientist.
