= Meg Luger-Nikolai =

American politician

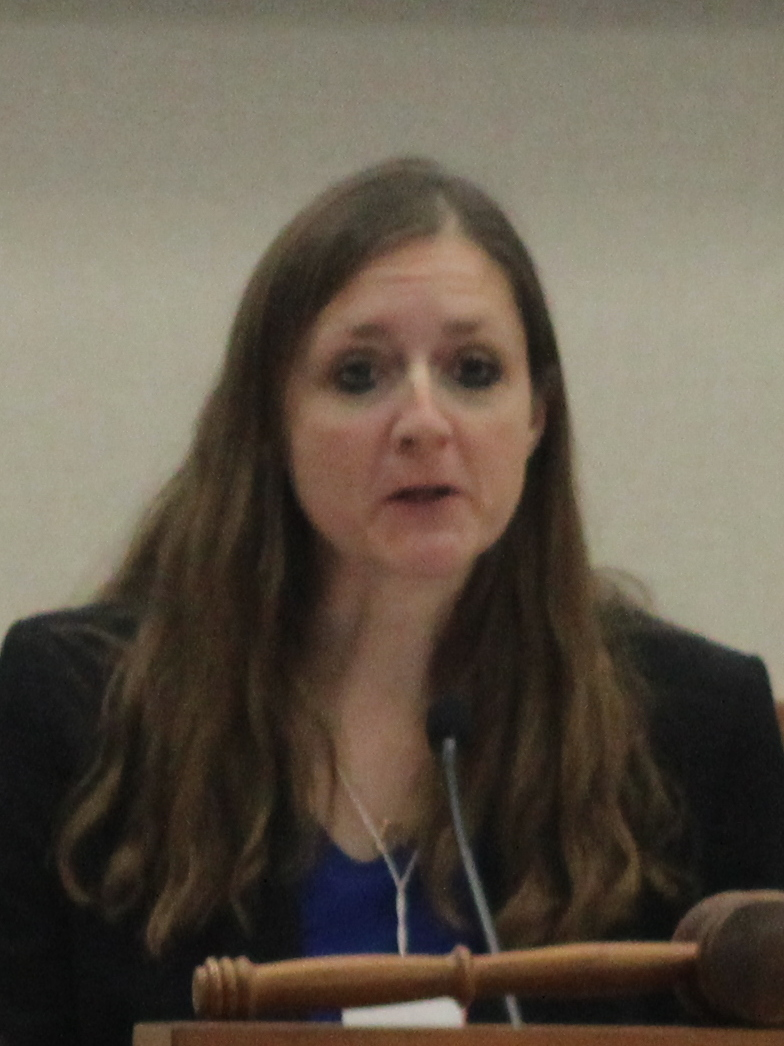
- Luger-Nikolai in December 2025

Member of the Minnesota House of Representatives from the 64A district
- Incumbent
- Assumed office February 3, 2026
- Preceded by: Kaohly Her

Personal details
- Born: Margaret Agnes Luger; 1978 or 1979 (age 47–48)
- Party: Democratic–Farmer–Labor
- Education: University of Minnesota
- Profession: Lawyer
- Website: https://www.house.mn.gov/members/profile/15654

Margaret Luger-Nikolai is an American lawyer and politician who represents district 64A in the Minnesota House of Representatives. A member of the Democratic–Farmer–Labor Party, she was elected in a special election in January 2026.

== Education and early career ==
Luger-Nikolai has B.A., M.P.P., and J.D degrees from the University of Minnesota. She represented trade unions and employees as an outside counsel before becoming a labor attorney for Education Minnesota, an education trade union, in 2010. She has chaired the Governing Council of the Minnesota State Bar Association's Labor and Employment Section and is a member of Minnesota's Public Employment Relations Board. She has been a fellow of The College of Labor and Employment Lawyers since 2025. She has also taught courses at the University of Minnesota Law School.

== Minnesota House of Representatives ==
District 64A, which is entirely within the city of Saint Paul, was represented by Kaohly Her until she was elected mayor of St. Paul in November 2025. Luger-Nikolai won a six-way Democratic–Farmer–Labor primary election for the seat on December 16, 2025. She was elected to the Minnesota House of Representatives in a special election on January 27, 2026, with 95% of the vote. Her election came during the backlash against the fatal shootings of two Minnesotans, Renee Good and Alex Pretti, by United States Immigration and Customs Enforcement agents.

Luger-Nikolai was sworn in on February 3, 2026, alongside Shelley Buck, who was also elected in a January special election.
