= Jonathan Claussen =

American politician

Member-elect of the Minnesota House of Representatives from the 5B district
- Assuming office January 12, 2027
- Succeeding: Mike Wiener

Personal details
- Party: Republican
- Website: www.claussenforhouse.org

Jonathan Claussen is an American politician who is the representative-elect for district 5B in the Minnesota House of Representatives. A member of the Minnesota Republican Party, he was elected in 2026. Claussen is a family physician.
