= Leah Hanson =

American politician

Member-elect of the Minnesota House of Representatives from the 18A district
- Assuming office January 12, 2027
- Succeeding: Erica Schwartz

Personal details
- Party: Democratic
- Education: Minnesota State University, Mankato
- Website: www.leahhansonforhouse.com

Leah Hanson is an American politician who is the representative-elect for district 18A in the Minnesota House of Representatives. A member of the Minnesota Democratic–Farmer–Labor Party, she was elected in 2026. Hanson graduated from Minnesota State University, Mankato, and is a counselor and social worker in North Mankato, Minnesota. She is disabled and uses a wheelchair.
