= Dawn Loberg =

American politician

Member-elect of the Minnesota House of Representatives from the 13B district
- Assuming office January 12, 2027
- Succeeding: Tim O'Driscoll

Personal details
- Party: Republican
- Website: lobergformnhouse.com

Dawn Loberg is an American politician who is the representative-elect for district 13B in the Minnesota House of Representatives. A member of the Minnesota Republican Party, she was elected in 2026. In 2014, she was a candidate for city council in Sartell, Minnesota. Loberg works for Enterprise Minnesota.
