= Kyrstin Schuette =

American politician

Member-elect of the Minnesota House of Representatives from the 43A district
- Assuming office January 12, 2027
- Succeeding: Cedrick Frazier

Personal details
- Party: Democratic
- Website: kyrstinforminnesota.com

Kyrstin Schuette is an American politician of the Minnesota Democratic–Farmer–Labor Party who is the representative-elect for district 43A in the Minnesota House of Representatives. She was elected at the 2026 election. She is a lesbian.
