= Erika Yoney =

American politician

Member-elect of the Minnesota House of Representatives from the 4A district
- Assuming office January 12, 2027
- Succeeding: Heather Keeler

Personal details
- Party: Democratic
- Education: Minnesota State University Moorhead
- Website: www.yoney4mnhouse.com

Erika Yoney is an American politician who is the representative-elect for district 4A in the Minnesota House of Representatives. A member of the Minnesota Democratic–Farmer–Labor Party, she was elected in 2026. Yoney is a psychiatric nurse.
