= Aaron Schweiger =

American politician

Member-elect of the Minnesota House of Representatives from the 3B district
- Assuming office January 12, 2027
- Succeeding: Natalie Zeleznikar

Personal details
- Party: Democratic

Aaron Schweiger is an American politician and real estate developer who is the representative-elect for district 3B in the Minnesota House of Representatives. A member of the Democratic–Farmer–Labor Party, he lives in Hermantown.
