= Jim DeMay =

American politician

Member-elect of the Minnesota House of Representatives from the 36A district
- Assuming office January 12, 2027
- Succeeding: Elliott Engen

Personal details
- Party: Democratic
- Education: University of Wisconsin–Madison; Hamline University
- Website: www.demayforhouse.com

Jim DeMay is an American politician who is the representative-elect for district 36A in the Minnesota House of Representatives. A member of the Minnesota Democratic–Farmer–Labor Party, he was elected in 2026 to a seat held by Republican Elliott Engen, who did not seek reelection. DeMay is a lobbyist for Pfizer and a member of the Mounds View Public Schools school board.
