= Krist Wollum =

American politician

Member-elect of the Minnesota House of Representatives from the 21A district
- Assuming office January 12, 2027
- Succeeding: Joe Schomacker

Personal details
- Party: Republican
- Website: wollum4house.com

Krist Wollum is an American politician who is the representative-elect for district 21A in the Minnesota House of Representatives. A member of the Minnesota Republican Party, he was elected in 2026. Wollum is a farmer from Porter, Minnesota. He previously ran for Senate District 21.
