= Tom Murphy (Minnesota politician) =

American politician

Member of the Minnesota House of Representatives from the 9B district
- Incumbent
- Assumed office January 3, 2023
- Preceded by: redistricted

Personal details
- Born: April 19, 1962 (age 64) Scott County, Minnesota, U.S.
- Party: Republican
- Spouse: Betty
- Children: 5
- Education: St. Cloud State University (BA)
- Occupation: Business owner; Legislator
- Website: Government website Campaign website

Tom Murphy (born April 19, 1962) is an American politician serving in the Minnesota House of Representatives since 2023. A member of the Republican Party of Minnesota, Murphy represents District 9B in western Minnesota, which includes the city of Perham and parts of Douglas and Otter Tail Counties.

== Early life, education, and career ==
Murphy was raised on a dairy farm in Scott County, Minnesota, along with his seven siblings. He attended college at St. Cloud State University, earning a bachelor's degree in marketing. Murphy runs an agriculture products business.

== Minnesota House of Representatives ==
Murphy was elected to the Minnesota House of Representatives in 2022. He first ran in an open seat created by legislative redistricting.

Murphy serves on the Health Finance and Policy and Transportation Finance and Policy Committees.

In 2025, Murphy and Pam Altendorf co-sponsored a bill to designate messenger RNA (mRNA) treatments, which include several COVID-19 vaccines, "weapons of mass destruction", and make possessing or administering them a crime punishable by up to 20 years in prison. The bill was drafted by a Florida-based hypnotist and conspiracy theorist who believes that mRNA treatments are "nanoparticle injections" that amount to "biological and technological weapons of mass destruction".

== Electoral history ==
2022 Minnesota State House - District 9B
| Party | Candidate | Votes | % |
|---|---|---|---|
| Republican | Tom Murphy | 15,332 | 70.29 |
| Democratic (DFL) | Jason Satter | 6,431 | 29.50 |
| Write-in | | 45 | 0.21 |
| Total votes | | 21,798 | 100.0 |
| Republican hold | | | |

== Personal life ==
Murphy lives in Underwood, Minnesota, with his wife, Betty, and five children. He is Catholic and attends St. James Catholic Church in Maine Township, Minnesota.
