= Klemzig =

Klemzig may refer to:

- Klemzig, German name for Klępsk, Poland, previously a Prussian village
- Klemzig, South Australia, a suburb of Adelaide named after the Prussian village

== See also ==
- Klemz
