= Steve Gander =

American politician (born 1961)

Member of the Minnesota House of Representatives from the 1B district
- Incumbent
- Assumed office January 14, 2025
- Preceded by: Deb Kiel

Mayor of East Grand Forks, Minnesota
- In office January 3, 2017 – January 7, 2025
- Preceded by: Lynn Stauss
- Succeeded by: Mark Olstad

Personal details
- Born: August 27, 1961 (age 65)
- Party: Republican
- Children: 2
- Website: Official website

Steve Gander (born August 27, 1961) is an American politician and optometrist who has represented district 1B in the Minnesota House of Representatives since 2025. A Republican, he served from 2017 to 2025 as the mayor of East Grand Forks, Minnesota.

Gander attended high school with future state senator Dave Thompson.

After incumbent Republican Deb Kiel declined to seek reelection, Gander announced his candidacy to succeed her. He took office in January 2025.
