= Jim Joy =

American politician

Member of the Minnesota House of Representatives from the 4B district
- Incumbent
- Assumed office January 3, 2023
- Preceded by: Paul Marquart

Personal details
- Born: April 18, 1977 (age 49) Detroit Lakes, Minnesota, U.S.
- Party: Republican
- Spouse: Stephanie
- Children: 3
- Occupation: Business owner; Legislator
- Website: Government website Campaign website

Jim Joy (born April 18, 1977) is an American politician serving in the Minnesota House of Representatives since 2023. A member of the Republican Party of Minnesota, Joy represents District 4B in northwestern Minnesota, which includes the cities of Detroit Lakes and Dilworth and parts of Becker and Clay Counties.

== Early life, education and career ==
Joy was born and grew up in Detroit Lakes, Minnesota. He has served as a volunteer firefighter and on the police reserve. Joy was on the Hawley, Minnesota, City Council for two years and served as mayor for six years.

== Minnesota House of Representatives ==
Joy was elected to the Minnesota House of Representatives in 2022. He first ran after legislative redistricting and after 11-term DFL incumbent Paul Marquart announced he would not seek reelection.

Joy won reelection in 2024.

Joy serves on the State and Local Government Finance and Policy Committee and the Taxes Committee.

== Electoral history ==
2022 Minnesota State House - District 4B
Party	Candidate	Votes	%
Republican	Jim Joy	10,780	62.88
Democratic (DFL)	John Hest	6,348	37.03
Write-in		15	0.09
Total votes		17,143	100.0
Republican gain from Democratic (DFL)			

2024 Minnesota State House - District 4B
Party	Candidate	Votes	%
Republican	Jim Joy	15,273	66.41
Democratic (DFL)	Thaddeus Laugisch	7,709	33.52
Write-in		16	0.07
Total votes		22,998	100.0
Republican hold			

== Personal life ==
Joy lives in Hawley, Minnesota, with his wife, Stephanie, and their three children.
