= Amáda Márquez Simula =

American politician

Member-elect of the Minnesota House of Representatives from the 39B district
- Assuming office January 12, 2027
- Succeeding: Sandra Feist

Mayor of Columbia Heights, Minnesota
- In office January 4, 2021 – January 4, 2027
- Preceded by: Donna Schmitt

Personal details
- Born: Madison, Wisconsin
- Party: Democratic (DFL)
- Occupation: Community organizer; Politician
- Website: Campaign website

Amáda Márquez Simula is an American politician from Columbia Heights, Minnesota. A member of the Minnesota Democratic-Farmer-Labor Party (DFL), she is the representative-elect for Minnesota House district 39B in Columbia Heights, Saint Anthony and New Brighton.

Prior to running for the state legislature, Márquez Simula served three terms as the mayor of Columbia Heights. When first elected in 2020, she was the first person of color elected to any city office in Columbia Heights and the second Latina mayor in Minnesota history.

== Early life and career ==
Amáda Márquez Simula was born in Madison, Wisconsin and raised in rural Wisconsin, the daughter of a white mother and a Mexican father. After spending some time in the American West, she moved to Edina, Minnesota, then, in 2013, to Columbia Heights. There, she founded HeightsNEXT, a community organization focused on sustainability and social justice; worked with the city's public works department on curbside composting; and volunteered in the community as a Girl Scout troop leader. With HeightsNEXT, she organized the city's first Pride festival.

== Political career ==
=== Mayor of Columbia Heights ===
By 2020, Márquez Simula ran for mayor, seeing it as an extension of her passion for community organizing. Marquez Simula won the election with a ten-point lead over city councilmember Nick Novitsky. She was named a "Champion of Change" by Minnesota Monthly magazine in 2021 shortly after taking office.

=== Minnesota House of Representatives ===
In 2025, state representative Sandra Feist announced her retirement from the Minnesota House of Representatives. Márquez Simula announced a campaign for the seat. After winning the DFL primary election by 35 percentage points, she won the general election by a 52-point margin.
