= Bobbie Harder =

American politician

Member of the Minnesota House of Representatives from the 17B district
- Incumbent
- Assumed office January 3, 2023
- Preceded by: redistricted

Personal details
- Born: Le Sueur, Minnesota, U.S.
- Party: Republican
- Spouse: Neal
- Children: 1
- Education: South Dakota State University (BS)
- Occupation: Farmer; Legislator
- Website: Government website Campaign website

Bobbie Harder is an American politician serving in the Minnesota House of Representatives since 2023. A member of the Republican Party of Minnesota, Harder represents District 17B, which includes parts of Carver, McLeod, and Sibley Counties.

== Early life, education and career ==
Harder was born in Le Sueur, Minnesota, and attended South Dakota State University, earning a bachelor's degree. She served as a county commissioner for Sibley County from 2015 to 2023.

== Minnesota House of Representatives ==
Harder was elected to the Minnesota House of Representatives in 2022. She first ran in an open seat after 2022 legislative redistricting.

Harder serves on the Agriculture Finance and Policy, Public Safety Finance and Policy, and Taxes Committees.

== Electoral history ==
2022 Minnesota State House - District 17B
Party	Candidate	Votes	%
Republican	Bobbie V. Harder	15,952	96.74
Write-in		538	3.26
Total votes		16,490	100.0
Republican hold			

== Personal life ==
Harder lives in Henderson Township, Minnesota, with her husband, Neal, and has one child.
