= Max Rymer =

American politician

Member of the Minnesota Legislature from the 28B district

House of Representatives
- Incumbent
- Assumed office January 14, 2025

Personal details
- Party: Republican
- Children: 3
- Education: B.S., marketing, University of Northwestern

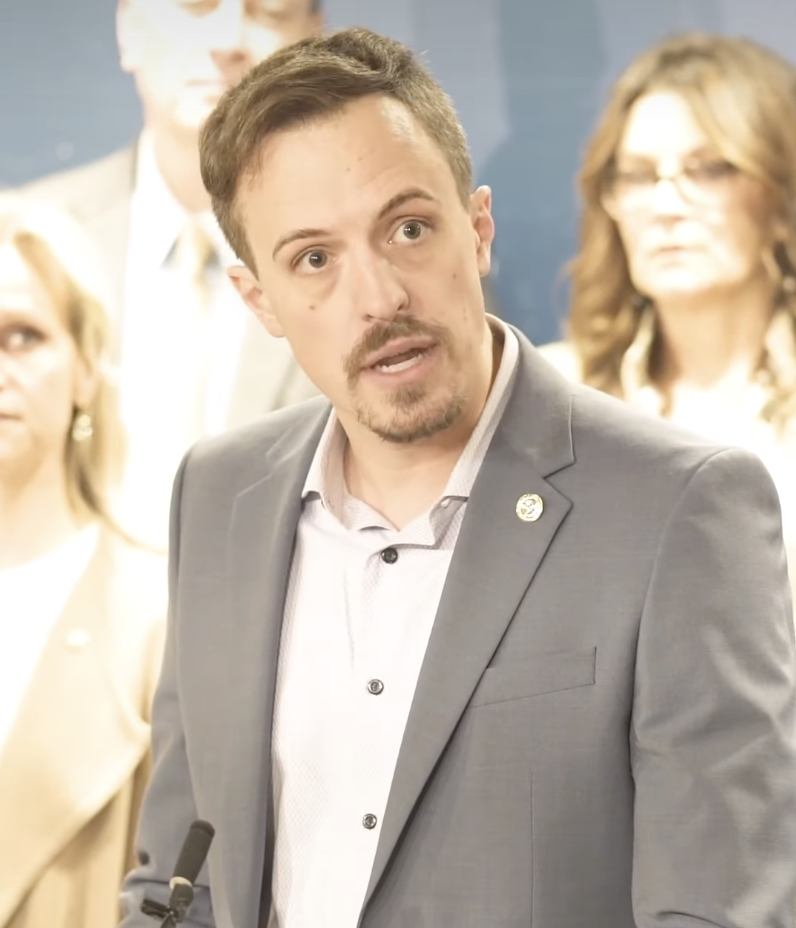
Max Rymer speaks at a House Republican press conference.

Max Rymer is an American politician who has represented District 28B in the Minnesota House of Representatives since 2025. He is a member of the Republican Party.
