= Summit Hill, Saint Paul =

Coordinates: 44°56′13″N 93°08′11″W

Summit Hill is a neighborhood and city planning district in Saint Paul, Minnesota, in the United States. The neighborhood, which is also District 16, is an approximately 75 square block area bounded by Summit Avenue on the north, Interstate 35E on the south and east, and Ayd Mill Road on the west.

The neighborhood is known for having one of the best preserved collections of old, Victorian homes in the United States. In 1862 steam boat mogul James C. Burbank built an Italianate mansion on the east side of the neighborhood. Another prominent home in the area is an 1889 row house that was a former residence of novelist F. Scott Fitzgerald. The Minnesota Governor's Residence, originally constructed in 1912 by Horace Hills Irvine, is also located in Summit Hill.

The primary commercial artery for Summit Hill is Grand Avenue, which has many shops, restaurants, and cafes, as well as three-story brick apartment buildings built in the early part of the 20th Century. The Grand Avenue Business Association has sponsored an annual summer festival since 1973. The festival is known as Grand Old Day and features a parade, vendors, live music, and other activities. It runs along Grand Avenue between Fairview and Dale Street, across all of Summit Hill and part of the adjacent neighborhood of Macalester-Groveland.
