= Huldah Hiltsley =

American politician

Member of the Minnesota House of Representatives from the 38A district
- Incumbent
- Assumed office January 2025
- Preceded by: Mike Nelson

Personal details
- Born: Kisii District, Nyanza Province, Kenya
- Party: Democratic-Farmer-Labor Party

Huldah Momanyi Hiltsley (born 1985) is an American politician serving in the Minnesota House of Representatives since 2025. She is the first Kenyan-American to win a state assembly seat in Minnesota. She was elected under the Democratic-Farmer-Labor party to represent District 38A in the 2025–2026 Minnesota House of Representatives.

She defeated Brad Olson of the Republican Party in the 2024 general election, after a narrow win against Wynfred Russel in the Democratic Party primaries.

== Personal life ==
Hiltsley is the daughter to Phillip Momanyi Sangaka and Tabitha Momanyi. She hails from Nyamemiso village in Nyamira, Kenya. Her father moved to the United States as a student in 1988. Her mother joined in 1992 and Huldah and her other two siblings joined them in 1995.

Hiltsley has four degrees, three bachelor's degrees in International Business, International Relations, and Reconciliation Studies, plus a master's in Global Business Management, from Bethel University.

Hiltsley has a spouse, Bart, and two children, Jaydah Rae and Jordan Philip.

== Career ==
Upon completion of her master's degree, Hiltsley relocated alongside her family to San Diego where she worked at Dexcom.

Prior to announcing her candidacy for election in 2023, she was a Privacy Operations Manager at Boston Scientific.

Hiltsley is passionate about uplifting lives, with a focus mainly on girls and women. In 2014, she founded SaniPads, which focuses on keeping girls in school in Kenya.

She also served as the first female president of Mwanyagetinge Organization based in Minnesota.
