= Bidal Duran Jr. =

American politician

Member of the Minnesota House of Representatives from the 2A district
- Incumbent
- Assumed office January 6, 2025
- Preceded by: Matt Grossell

Personal details
- Born: July 16, 1985 (age 41) Bakersfield, California, U.S.
- Party: Republican

Bidal Duran Jr. (born July 16, 1985) is an American politician. He has served as a member of the Minnesota House of Representatives since 2025, representing the 2A district. He is a member of the Republican Party.
