= Stacey Stout =

American politician

Member-elect of the Minnesota House of Representatives from the 33A district
- Assuming office January 2027
- Succeeding: Patricia Anderson

Personal details
- Party: Republican

Stacey Stout is an American politician. A member of the Republican Party, she is the member-elect for the 33A district of the Minnesota House of Representatives.
