= Cal Warwas =

American politician (born 1976)

Member of the Minnesota House of Representatives from the 7B district
- Incumbent
- Assumed office January 6, 2025
- Preceded by: Dave Lislegard

Personal details
- Born: September 1, 1976 (age 50) Virginia, Minnesota, U.S.
- Party: Republican

Cal Warwas (born September 1, 1976) is an American politician serving since 2025 as a member of the Minnesota House of Representatives, representing District 7B. He is a member of the Republican Party. As of 2026, Warwas works for U.S. Steel.
