= Ben Davis (Minnesota politician) =

American politician

Member of the Minnesota House of Representatives from the 6A district
- Incumbent
- Assumed office January 3, 2023
- Preceded by: Redistricted

Personal details
- Born: May 24, 1977 (age 49)
- Party: Republican
- Spouse: Dawn
- Children: 6
- Occupation: Pastor; Legislator
- Website: Government website

Ben Davis (born May 24, 1977) is an American politician serving in the Minnesota House of Representatives since 2023. A member of the Republican Party of Minnesota, Davis represents District 6A in northern Minnesota, which includes the city of Grand Rapids and parts of Cass, Crow Wing, and Itasca Counties.

== Minnesota House of Representatives ==
Davis was elected to the Minnesota House of Representatives in 2022. He first ran in an open seat after redistricting and the retirement of three-term Republican incumbent John Poston.

Davis was among those supporting for an audit of 2020 election results in Crow Wing County, saying he wanted to make sure the laws were followed and no fraud occurred.

Davis serves on the Children and Families Finance and Policy, Climate and Energy Finance and Policy, and Elections Finance and Policy Committees.

== Electoral history ==
2022 Minnesota State House - District 6A
Party	Candidate	Votes	%
Republican	Ben Davis	13,657	62.30
Democratic (DFL)	Richard (Rick) Blake	8,258	37.67
Write-in		7	0.03
Total votes		21,922	100.0
Republican hold			

== Personal life ==
Davis lives in Merrifield, Minnesota, with his wife, Dawn, and six children. He is a pastor at Remnant Ministry Center, a nondenominational church in Brainerd, Minnesota.
