= Ben Bakeberg =

American politician

Member of the Minnesota House of Representatives from the 54B district
- Incumbent
- Assumed office January 3, 2023
- Preceded by: Tony Albright
- Succeeded by: Natalie Barnes (elect)

Personal details
- Born: July 15, 1978 (age 48) Cokato, Minnesota, U.S.
- Party: Republican
- Spouse: Lindy
- Children: 3
- Education: University of Northwestern – St. Paul (BS); Minnesota State University, Mankato (MS)
- Occupation: Educator; Legislator
- Website: Government website Campaign website

Ben Bakeberg (born July 15, 1978) is an American politician serving in the Minnesota House of Representatives since 2023. A member of the Republican Party of Minnesota, Bakeberg represents District 54B south of the Twin Cities metropolitan area, which includes the city of Prior Lake and parts of Scott County.

== Early life, education and career ==
Bakeberg received his Bachelor of Science degree in elementary education from the University of Northwestern - St. Paul, and his Master's in science in education leadership from Minnesota State University Mankato.

He worked as the principal of Jordan Middle School in Jordan, Minnesota.

== Minnesota House of Representatives ==
Bakeberg was elected to the Minnesota House of Representatives in 2022. He first ran after redistricting and after five-term Republican incumbent Tony Albright announced he would not seek reelection and resigned to take a lobbying job.

Bakeberg serves on the Education Finance and Education Policy Committees.

=== Political positions ===
Bakeberg's 2024 campaign slogan is "strong families, strong communities, and strong schools."

Bakeberg opposed legislation that would require Minnesota high schools to offer an ethnic studies course, saying: "Diversity makes us stronger. Learning different perspectives makes each of us, just simply at a basic level, better human beings. However, local school districts across the state are already doing this, and they don't need us to mandate."

Bakeberg, who has overseen a school lunchroom as a teacher and principal, said a bill guaranteeing a daily breakfast and lunch to all students "does not ensure that every student will be full" and would not eliminate school lunch debt because some children may choose to get extra meals: "Kids are saying, 'I need an extra entrée, I need a la carte' and kids continue to be hungry because of the federal lunch guidelines."

During a committee hearing on Minnesota's literacy requirements, Bakeberg said that whole language and balanced literacy programs are "quite possibly one of the greatest frauds in education in the past 40 years". He added, "We cannot abandon our children for those interested in protecting their pockets—money—and protecting systems that are more comfortable for adults than they are for kids."

== Electoral history ==
2022 Minnesota State House - District 54B
| Party | Candidate | Votes | % |
|---|---|---|---|
| Republican | Ben Bakeberg | 12,317 | 60.70 |
| Democratic (DFL) | Brendan Van Alstyne | 7,962 | 39.24 |
| Write-in | | 14 | 0.07 |
| Total votes | | 20,293 | 100.0 |
| Republican hold | | | |

2024 Minnesota State House - District 54B
| Party | Candidate | Votes | % |
|---|---|---|---|
| Republican | Ben Bakeberg (incumbent) | 15,807 | 61.94 |
| Democratic (DFL) | Jean Lee | 9,696 | 37.99 |
| Write-in | | 18 | 0.07 |
| Total votes | | 25,521 | 100.00 |
| Republican hold | | | |

== Personal life ==
Bakeberg lives in Jordan, Minnesota, with his wife, Lindy, and has three children.
