= Aaron Klemz =

American politician

Member-elect of the Minnesota House of Representatives from the 39A district
- Assuming office January 12, 2027
- Succeeding: Erin Koegel

Personal details
- Party: Democratic
- Education: Southern Illinois University Carbondale; University of Minnesota Duluth
- Website: www.aaronklemz.com

Aaron Klemz is an American politician of the Minnesota Democratic–Farmer–Labor Party who is the representative-elect for district 39A in the Minnesota House of Representatives. He was elected at the 2026 election. He is the chief strategy officer at the Minnesota Center for Environmental Advocacy.
