= Kari Rehrauer =

American politician

Member of the Minnesota House of Representatives from the 35B district
- Incumbent
- Assumed office January 14, 2025
- Preceded by: Jerry Newton

Member of the Coon Rapids City Council from the 2nd Ward
- In office January 1, 2021 – December 31, 2024

Personal details
- Born: Kari Lynn Geissler; December 8, 1975 (age 50)
- Party: Minnesota Democratic–Farmer–Labor Party
- Spouse: Dan
- Children: 2
- Education: University of Minnesota (BS, MEd)
- Website: Campaign website

Kari Rehrauer (/ˈkeɪ̯.ɹi ˈɹeɪ.ɹoʊ.ɚ/) is an American politician and member of the Minnesota House of Representatives. A member of the Minnesota Democratic-Farmer-Labor Party (DFL), she represents District 35B in the northwestern Twin Cities metropolitan area, which includes the cities of Coon Rapids and Andover. She previously served on the Coon Rapids City Council.

== Electoral history ==
2022 Minnesota State Senate - District 35
Party	Candidate	Votes	%
Republican	Jim Abeler	17,300	50.22
Democratic (DFL)	Kari Rehrauer	17,114	49.68
Write-in		34	0.10
Total votes		34,448	100.0
Republican hold			

2024 Minnesota State House - District 35B
Party	Candidate	Votes	%
Democratic (DFL)	Kari Rehrauer	11,560	50.51
Republican	Steve Pape	11,280	49.29
Write-in		47	0.21
Total votes		22,887	100.0
Democratic (DFL) hold			
