= Mike Wiener =

American politician

Member of the Minnesota House of Representatives from the 5B district
- Incumbent
- Assumed office January 3, 2023
- Preceded by: redistricted
- Succeeded by: Jonathan Claussen (elect)

Personal details
- Born: Minnesota, U.S.
- Party: Republican
- Children: 9
- Education: St. Cloud Technical and Community College
- Occupation: Business owner; Legislator
- Website: Government website Campaign website

Mike Wiener (/ˈwiːnər/ WEE-nər) is an American politician who is a member-elect of the Minnesota Senate for the 5th district. He has served in the Minnesota House of Representatives since 2023. A member of the Republican Party of Minnesota, Wiener represents District 5B in central Minnesota, which includes the cities of Wadena and Long Prairie and parts of Cass, Morrison, Todd and Wadena Counties. Wiener did not run for reelection to the Minnesota House in 2026, instead running for the Minnesota Senate. His House term ends on January 12, 2027.

== Early life, education and career ==
Wiener attended St. Cloud Technical and Community College, earning a degree in sales and marketing. He previously served on the Todd County Planning and Zoning Board. Wiener raises grass-fed Texas longhorn beef cattle and has operated an animal bedding and biomass company repurposing waste wood for 15 years.

== Minnesota House of Representatives ==
Wiener was elected to the Minnesota House of Representatives in 2022. He first ran for an open seat created by legislative redistricting.

Wiener serves on the Economic Development Finance and Policy Committee and the Taxes Committee.

== Electoral history ==
2022 Minnesota State House - District 5B
Party	Candidate	Votes	%
Republican	Mike Wiener	13,679	75.36
Independence	Gregg Hendrickson	4,422	24.36
Write-in		50	0.28
Total votes		18,151	100.0
Republican hold			

== Personal life ==
Wiener lives in Long Prairie, Minnesota, with his spouse and nine children.

== Political positions ==
In an August 2022 interview, Wiener said drugs in rural Minnesota and workforce development are among his top issues. He opposes any exceptions to abortion bans for rape or incest, arguing that adoption is a viable option. He said he would fight any "red flag" law that permits a state court to order the temporary removal of firearms from a person it finds may present a danger to others or themselves. Wiener supports "constitution carry", the right to carry a firearm in public without a permit, and stronger protections for people defending their own property.
