= Josiah Hill =

American politician

Member of the Minnesota House of Representatives from the 33B district
- Incumbent
- Assumed office January 3, 2023
- Preceded by: Shelly Christensen

Personal details
- Born: December 15, 1976 (age 49)
- Party: Democratic (DFL)
- Spouse: Emily
- Children: 3
- Education: University of Wisconsin (B.A.) (M.S.E.); Hamline University (Ed.D.)
- Occupation: Teacher; Legislator
- Website: Government website Campaign website

Josiah Hill (born December 15, 1976) is an American politician serving in the Minnesota House of Representatives since 2023. A member of the Minnesota Democratic-Farmer-Labor Party (DFL), Hill represents District 33B in the eastern Twin Cities metropolitan area, which includes the cities of Stillwater, Forest Lake, and Bayport, and parts of Washington County.

== Early life, education and career ==
Hill grew up in Stillwater, Minnesota. He earned a bachelor's degree in English from the University of Wisconsin–Madison; an M.S.E. in English/language arts from the University of Wisconsin, River Falls; and an Ed.D. in educational leadership from Hamline University.

Hill is an English teacher at Stillwater Area High School and has been president of the St. Croix Education Association since 2010.

== Minnesota House of Representatives ==
Hill was elected to the Minnesota House of Representatives in 2022. He first ran for the Minnesota Senate in 2020, losing to two-term Republican incumbent Karin Housley. Hill ran for the House in 2022 and won after the retirement of two-term DFL incumbent Shelly Christensen. He was reelected in 2024 and 2026.

Hill serves as vice chair of the Education Policy Committee, and also sits on the Labor and Industry Finance and Policy and Education Finance Committees.

=== Political positions ===
Hill campaigned on a platform focused on environmental protection, more funding for schools, expanding healthcare, and racial equity. In 2023, he authored legislation that would help a power plant in Oak Park Heights decommission its coal power plant as a part of Xcel Energy's plan to move toward renewable energy sources.

== Electoral history ==
2020 Minnesota State Senate - District 39
| Party | Candidate | Votes | % |
|---|---|---|---|
| Republican | Karin Housley (incumbent) | 29,246 | 52.97 |
| Democratic (DFL) | Josiah Hill | 25,921 | 46.95 |
| Write-in | | 45 | 0.08 |
| Total votes | | 55,212 | 100.0 |
| Republican hold | | | |

2022 Minnesota State House - District 33B
| Party | Candidate | Votes | % |
|---|---|---|---|
| Democratic (DFL) | Josiah Hill | 12,074 | 53.94 |
| Republican | Mark Bishofsky | 10,277 | 45.91 |
| Write-in | | 33 | 0.15 |
| Total votes | | 22,384 | 100.0 |
| Democratic (DFL) hold | | | |

2024 Minnesota State House - District 33B
| Party | Candidate | Votes | % |
|---|---|---|---|
| Democratic (DFL) | Josiah Hill (incumbent) | 13,631 | 51.30 |
| Republican | Jessica L. Johnson | 12,913 | 48.60 |
| Write-in | | 28 | 0.11 |
| Total votes | | 26,572 | 100.0 |
| Democratic (DFL) hold | | | |

2026 Minnesota State House - District 33B
| Party | Candidate | Votes | % |
|---|---|---|---|
| Democratic (DFL) | Josiah Hill (incumbent) | 13,289 | 55.48 |
| Republican | Jessica L. Johnson | 10,634 | 44.39 |
| Write-in | | 31 | 0.13 |
| Total votes | | 23,954 | 100.0 |
| Democratic (DFL) hold | | | |

== Personal life ==
Hill lives in Stillwater, Minnesota, with his wife, Emily, and has three children.
