= Christos Jensen =

American politician

Member-elect of the Minnesota House of Representatives from the 52A district
- Assuming office January 2027
- Succeeding: Liz Reyer

Personal details
- Party: Democratic (DFL)

Christos Jensen is an American politician. A member of the Democratic–Farmer–Labor Party, he is the member-elect for the 52A district of the Minnesota House of Representatives.
