= Aisha Elmquist =

American politician

Member-elect of the Minnesota House of Representatives from the 40A district
- Assuming office January 12, 2027
- Succeeding: Kelly Moller

Personal details
- Party: Democratic
- Education: University of Michigan Law School
- Website: www.voteelmquist.com

Aisha Elmquist is an American politician of the Minnesota Democratic–Farmer–Labor Party who is the representative-elect for district 40A in the Minnesota House of Representatives. She was elected at the 2026 election. She was director of the Olmstead Implementation Office (OIO), a state agency focused on increasing accessibility for Minnesotans with disabilities, from 2023 to early 2026.
