= Natalie Barnes (politician) =

American politician

Member-elect of the Minnesota House of Representatives from the 54B district
- Assuming office January 2027
- Succeeding: Ben Bakeberg

Personal details
- Party: Republican

Natalie Barnes is an American politician. A member of the Republican Party, she is the member-elect for the 54B district of the Minnesota House of Representatives.
