= Bernie Perryman =

American politician

Member of the Minnesota House of Representatives from the 14A district
- Incumbent
- Assumed office January 3, 2023
- Preceded by: Tama Theis

Personal details
- Born: January 8, 1959 (age 67)
- Party: Republican
- Spouse: Keith
- Education: Quincy College (BA)
- Occupation: Business owner; Legislator
- Website: Government website Campaign website

Bernadette "Bernie" Perryman (born January 8, 1959) is an American politician serving in the Minnesota House of Representatives since 2023. A member of the Republican Party of Minnesota, Perryman represents District 14A in central Minnesota, which includes the cities of St. Cloud and Waite Park and parts of Stearns County.

== Early life, education and career ==
Perryman graduated from Quincy College with a bachelor's degree in marketing. She moved to St. Cloud, Minnesota, in 1999, and worked as commissioner of the St. Cloud City Economic Development Authority.

== Minnesota House of Representatives ==
Perryman was elected to the Minnesota House of Representatives in 2022. She first ran for an open seat created after legislative redistricting and the retirement of Republican incumbent Tama Theis, who ran for a seat in the Minnesota Senate.

Perryman serves on the Commerce Finance and Policy, Economic Development Finance and Policy, and Health Finance and Policy Committees.

== Legislative record ==
Perryman and Representative Dan Wolgamott co-authored the "Minnesota Bitcoin Act", introduced on April 1, 2025. The proposal would allow payments to the state in cryptocurrency and authorize the State Board of Investment to invest in cryptocurrencies. It would also allow payment of property taxes, interest, and penalties to county treasurers in cryptocurrency, and modify how cryptocurrency affects calculation of "investment income" and alternative minimum taxable income in state income taxes.

In February 2026, Perryman joined three other Minnesota House members as an author of a bill that would prohibit "virtual currency kiosks". According to the Minnesota House Research summary, it prohibits operation of kiosks after August 1, 2026, requires their removal from public spaces by the end of the year, and mandates that kiosk operators pay out money or virtual currency held on behalf of customers if the kiosk operator provides no other way for customers to access their funds. An estimated 350 crypto kiosks are licensed in Minnesota. Similar efforts to ban crypto kiosks have occurred in Tennessee and Indiana.

Perryman authored a bill to allow Minnesota banks and credit unions to provide virtual currency services so long as they "act in a safe and sound manner and have written policies regarding risk management, internal controls, cybersecurity, business continuity, and compliance".

Minnesota has banned cryptocurrency ATMs effective August 1, 2026, and banking institutions may provide virtual-currency custody services in a fiduciary or nonfiduciary capacity.

== Political Positions ==
In June 2025, Perryman told a local conservative group "Minnesota Freedom Advocates" her view on National Guard troops monitoring election polls: "Because Trump does not like what’s going on in Minnesota, there’s a rumor he may send the National Guard in on Election Day," Perryman said on the audio recording. "I don’t know. I think it’s good, but man, that presence, look what ICE did. That presence should stop it." Three months later Perryman said those statements don't reflect her current position.

== Electoral history ==
2022 Minnesota State House - District 14A
Party	Candidate	Votes	%
Republican	Bernie Perryman	7,259	50.64
Democratic (DFL)	Tami Calhoun	7,060	49.25
Write-in		15	0.10
Total votes		14,334	100.0
Republican hold			

2024 Minnesota State House - District 14A
Party	Candidate	Votes	%
Republican	Bernie Perryman	10,967	56.31
Democratic (DFL)	Abdi Daisane	8,463	43.46
Write-in		45	0.23
Total votes		19,475	100.0
Republican hold			

== Personal life ==
Perryman lives in St. Augusta, Minnesota, with her spouse, Keith.
