= Steven Jacob =

American politician

Member of the Minnesota House of Representatives from the 20B district
- Incumbent
- Assumed office January 3, 2023
- Preceded by: Steve Drazkowski

Personal details
- Born: June 13, 1966 (age 60)
- Party: Republican
- Spouse: MaryAnn Mae
- Children: 4
- Occupation: Business owner; Legislator
- Website: Government website Campaign website

Steven E. Jacob (born June 13, 1966) is an American politician who has represented District 20B in the Minnesota House of Representatives since 2023. He is a member of the Republican Party of Minnesota. District 20B includes the cities of Plainview, St. Charles, and Zumbrota, and parts of Goodhue, Olmsted, Wabasha, and Winona Counties.

== Early life, education and career ==
Jacob grew up on a farm and is a fourth-generation family farmer. He served as a county commissioner for Winona County, where he was part of the Soil and Water Conservation Board, Planning Commission, and Road and Bridge Committee.

== Minnesota House of Representatives ==
Jacob was elected to the Minnesota House of Representatives in 2022. He first ran after redistricting and after eight-term Republican incumbent Steve Drazkowski announced he would run for a seat in the Minnesota Senate.

Jacob serves on the Agriculture Finance and Policy and the Environment and Natural Resources Finance and Policy Committees.

=== Political positions ===
Jacob was the only representative to vote against establishing Juneteenth as a Minnesota state holiday, saying, "I saw this as an expansion of government where the taxpayer will be charged, but will receive one less day of service from all local levels of government".

== Electoral history ==
2022 Minnesota State House - District 20B
Party	Candidate	Votes	%
Republican	Steven E. Jacob	13,375	66.09
Democratic (DFL)	Elise Diesslin	6,845	33.82
Write-in		19	0.09
Total votes		20,239	100.0
Republican hold			

== Personal life ==
Jacob lives in Altura, Minnesota with his wife, MaryAnn Mae, and has four children.
