= Natalie Zeleznikar =

American politician (born 1966)

Member of the Minnesota House of Representatives from the 3B district
- Incumbent
- Assumed office January 3, 2023
- Preceded by: Mary Murphy

Personal details
- Born: September 9, 1966 (age 59) St. Francis, Minnesota, U.S.
- Party: Republican
- Spouse: Dan
- Children: 2
- Education: University of Wisconsin–Eau Claire (BS)
- Occupation: Entrepreneur; Legislator
- Website: Government website Campaign website

Natalie Zeleznikar (/zɪˈlɛznɪkɑːr/ zil-EZ-nik-ar; born September 9, 1966) is an American politician serving in the Minnesota House of Representatives since 2023. A member of the Republican Party of Minnesota, Zeleznikar represents District 3B in northern Minnesota, which includes the cities of Hermantown, Two Harbors, and Rice Lake, and parts of Lake and St. Louis Counties.

== Early life, education, and career ==
Zeleznikar grew up on a farm in St. Francis, Minnesota, and graduated from St. Francis Public Schools. She attended the University of Wisconsin-Eau Claire, earning a bachelor's degree in health care administration.

She has worked as a nursing home administrator owner/operator in health care administration for 30 years. Zeleznikar is a breast cancer survivor and wrote a book about her experience.

== Minnesota House of Representatives ==
Zeleznikar was elected to the Minnesota House of Representatives in 2022. She defeated 23-term DFL incumbent Mary Murphy by 0.15%, triggering an automatic recount under state law, after which Zeleznikar was declared the winner by 33 votes. She was reelected in 2024 by a margin of 159 votes, or 0.6%.

In her first term, Zeleznikar served on the Children and Families Finance and Policy, Human Services Finance, and Workforce Development Finance and Policy Committees. In her second term, she serves on the Children and Families Finance and Policy, Health Finance and Policy, Workforce, Labor, and Economic Development Finance and Policy, and Rules and Legislative Administration Committees.

=== Political positions ===
Zeleznikar has criticized "heavy handed regulations" for hurting the nursing home industry, as well as gaps in funding and labor shortages. During the 2023 legislative session, she advocated that more funding be allocated to supporting seniors and nursing homes. She opposed the year's tax bill and criticized DFLers for raising the gas tax, vehicle tab tax, and instituting a delivery tax on certain orders.

In her campaign, Zelznikar's top three issues were mental illness, supporting businesses through tax cuts, and fixing the education system. She said she would "fund the police, not defund the police, which led to increased murder rates and increased violent crime". During her first campaign, Zeleznikar said she believed viability begins at conception, supports regulations on abortion such as a 24-hour waiting period, and favored banning abortion during the second and third trimesters. In office, she voted against a bill that permitted abortions at any time during pregnancy. She voted for a ban on third-trimester abortions with an exception for the health of the mother and a prohibition on partial birth abortions, and sponsored legislation to fund assistance programs for women facing an unexpected pregnancy.

During her second term, Zeleznikar co-sponsored legislation that would automatically return future state budget surpluses to taxpayers in the form of property tax relief and income tax relief. She also co-sponsored legislation to provide property tax relief for seniors over 65, tax credits for childcare and dependent care expenses, and enhanced funding for school safety.

Zeleznikar criticized her opponent, Mary Murphy, for being in office for 46 years and said she signed "a pledge to honor term limits for myself" without saying what the term limit was. Zeleznikar opposed funding for the Northern Lights Express, a high-speed passenger rail line connecting Minneapolis and Duluth.

== Electoral history ==
2022 Minnesota State House - District 3B
Party	Candidate	Votes	%
Republican	Natalie Zeleznikar	10,813	50.00
Democratic (DFL)	Mary Murphy (incumbent)	10,780	49.85
Write-in		31	0.14
Total votes		21,624	100.0
Republican gain from Democratic (DFL)			

== Personal life ==
Zeleznikar lives in Fredenburg Township, Minnesota, with her husband, Dan and their two children. She is Lutheran and attends Peace in Christ Lutheran Church in Hermantown.
