= Pam Altendorf =

American politician

Member of the Minnesota House of Representatives from the 20A district
- Incumbent
- Assumed office January 3, 2023
- Preceded by: Redistricted

Personal details
- Born: November 17, 1972 (age 53)
- Party: Republican
- Spouse: Kevin
- Children: 5
- Education: University of Minnesota
- Occupation: Business Executive; Legislator
- Website: Government website Campaign website

Pam Altendorf (born November 17, 1972) is an American politician serving in the Minnesota House of Representatives since 2023. A member of the Republican Party of Minnesota, Altendorf represents District 20A in southeastern Minnesota, which includes the cities of Red Wing, Lake City and Cannon Falls, and parts of Dakota, Goodhue, and Wabasha Counties.

== Minnesota House of Representatives ==
Altendorf was elected to the Minnesota House of Representatives in 2022. She first ran after legislative redistricting. Altendorf defeated Jesse Johnson in a contested Republican primary. She was characterized as the anti-establishment candidate due to business groups' support of Johnson. Altendorf was endorsed by far-right representative Steve Drazkowski, who ran for the district's seat in the Minnesota Senate.

Altendorf serves on the Climate and Energy Finance and Policy, Education Finance, and Elections Finance and Policy Committees.

=== Political positions ===
Altendorf said her top issues while running were medical freedom and election integrity. She has spoken at local anti-vaccine groups' rallies. She is pro-life and has said that legislation the Minnesota House passed to codify the right to an abortion would make Minnesota "the most extreme state on abortion laws".

Altendorf has opposed legislation that would create a paid family and medical leave program that would provide partial pay to workers for up to 20 weeks as well as a law that ensured all workers would earn one hour of time off for every 30 hours worked, which she said is "vilifying small businesses... and killing our economy". She opposed legislation requiring Minnesota high schools to offer an ethnic studies course, saying it would further divide the country.

Altendorf has claimed that energy and elections bills the Minnesota Legislature passed in 2023 were "truly unconstitutional" and would lead to lawsuits, including a law requiring financial disclosure by groups involved in campaigning. She opposed legislation that would allow 16- and 17-year-olds to preregister to vote, saying it would open up elections to "more questioning, more scrutiny, and people feeling like this is not secure". She opposed legislation requiring the state's utilities to move to carbon-free electricity by 2040.

Altendorf supported legislation that would crack down on the use of deepfakes, audio and videos created by artificial intelligence, when they are used to influence elections or used to distribute fake sexual images of someone without their consent. She also sponsored the "Preserving Girls Sports Act", which would require children of elementary school age who wish to play sports to submit to a genital inspection, testosterone test, or chromosome analysis by a licensed physician "if there is a dispute" over their gender.

In 2025, Altendorf co-sponsored a bill to designate messenger RNA (mRNA) treatments, which include several COVID-19 vaccines, "weapons of mass destruction", and make possessing or administering them a crime punishable by up to 20 years in prison. The bill was drafted by a Florida-based hypnotist and conspiracy theorist who believes that mRNA treatments are "nanoparticle injections" that amount to "biological and technological weapons of mass destruction".

Altendorf wrote a letter demanding that a full toxicology report be published on the shooter in the 2025 Annunciation Catholic Church shooting in Minneapolis. Her letter was heavily critical of Democrats who she claimed politicized the shooting while claiming it was essential to know what medications the shooter may have been taking.

=== Immigration and Customs Enforcement (ICE) ===
During the winter of 2025-2026, Altendorf supported the ICE operations in Minnesota. She was highly critical of Governor Walz and Minneapolis Mayor Jacob Frey and supported President Trump's efforts to charge them for crimes for their speech opposing ICE operations. Altendorf said, "We’re in a dangerous place when elected Dems are encouraging illegal activities." She made no public comment on the killing of Renée Good.

== Electoral history ==
2022 Republican Primary for Minnesota State House - District 20A
Party	Candidate	Votes	%
Republican	Pam Altendorf	2,898	51.81
Republican	Jesse Johnson	2,695	48.19
Total votes		5,593	100.0

2022 Minnesota State House - District 20A
Party	Candidate	Votes	%
Republican	Pam Altendorf	10,607	51.79
Democratic (DFL)	Laurel Stinson	7,698	37.59
Minnesota Independent Party	Roger Kittelson	2,158	10.54
Write-in		18	0.09
Total votes		20,481	100.0
Republican hold			

2024 Minnesota State House - District 20A
Party	Candidate	Votes	%
Republican	Pam Altendorf (incumbent)	14,333	57.60
Democratic (DFL)	Heather Arndt	10,535	42.34
Write-in		15	0.06
Total votes		24,883	100.0
Republican hold			

== Personal life ==
Altendorf lives in Red Wing, Minnesota, with her husband, Kevin, and has five children. Her second cousin is Brian Pfarr, who has served in the Minnesota House since 2021.
