= Aaron Repinski =

American politician

- Repinski in 2026

Member of the Minnesota House of Representatives from the 26A district
- Incumbent
- Assumed office January 14, 2025
- Preceded by: Gene Pelowski

Winona City Council member
- In office 2021–2025
- Preceded by: Paul Schollmeier
- Succeeded by: Jason Dicus

Personal details
- Born: October 3, 1973 (age 53)
- Party: Republican
- Spouse: Michelle
- Education: Cotter High School (secondary); Winona State University (A.A.)
- Occupation: Firefighter; Legislator; Business owner
- Website: Government website Campaign website

Aaron Repinski (born October 3, 1973) is an American politician serving in the Minnesota House of Representatives since 2025. A member of the Republican Party of Minnesota, he represents District 26A, in Winona County.

== Early life, education and career ==
Repinski grew up in Winona, Minnesota, where he attended Cotter High School. He received an associate's degree from Winona State University. Earlier in life, he was a firefighter in Winona and in Fountain City, Wisconsin.

In 2020, he was elected to represent the at-large district of the Winona City Council, defeating incumbent Paul Schollmeier by over 11 percentage points.

== Minnesota House of Representatives ==
In 2024, after 38 years in office, Gene Pelowski of the Minnesota Democratic-Farmer-Labor Party, representative for Legislative District 26A in the Minnesota House of Representatives, retired and did not seek reelection. District 26A was quickly identified as a potential flip for the Republican Party: although Pelowski had won by over 10 points in 2022, the Winona area had been trending conservative in recent years.

Repinski ran for the seat in the 2024 election, defeating S. James Doerr in the Republican primary. He then won the general election by five points over the DFL nominee, Fair Vote Minnesota leader Sarah Kruger. This was a 16-point swing in favor of the Republican Party, one of the largest swings in the House that year.

== Personal life ==
Repinski lives in Winona with his wife, Michelle. He is a member of the Basilica of Saint Stanislaus Kostka, a minor basilica of the Roman Catholic Church. He owns Winona Tour Boat, a company offering Mississippi River cruises. He also officiates weddings and has a hypnosis act.

== Electoral history ==
2020 Winona Council Member at Large
Candidate	Votes	%
Aaron Repinski	6,559	55.70
Paul Schollmeier	5,171	43.92
Write-in	45	0.38
Total votes	11,775	100.0

2024 Minnesota House District 26A Republican primary
Party	Candidate	Votes	%
Republican	Aaron Repinski	2,247	86.69%
Republican	S. James Doerr	345	13.31%
Total votes		2,592	100%

2024 Minnesota House District 26A
Party	Candidate	Votes	%
Republican	Aaron Repinski	12,240	52.74
Democratic (DFL)	Sarah Kruger	10,916	47.04
Write-in		52	0.22
Total votes		23,208	100.00
Republican gain from Democratic (DFL)			
