= 2024 Minnesota House of Representatives election =

- November 5, 2024

All 134 seats in the Minnesota House of Representatives 68 seats needed for a majority
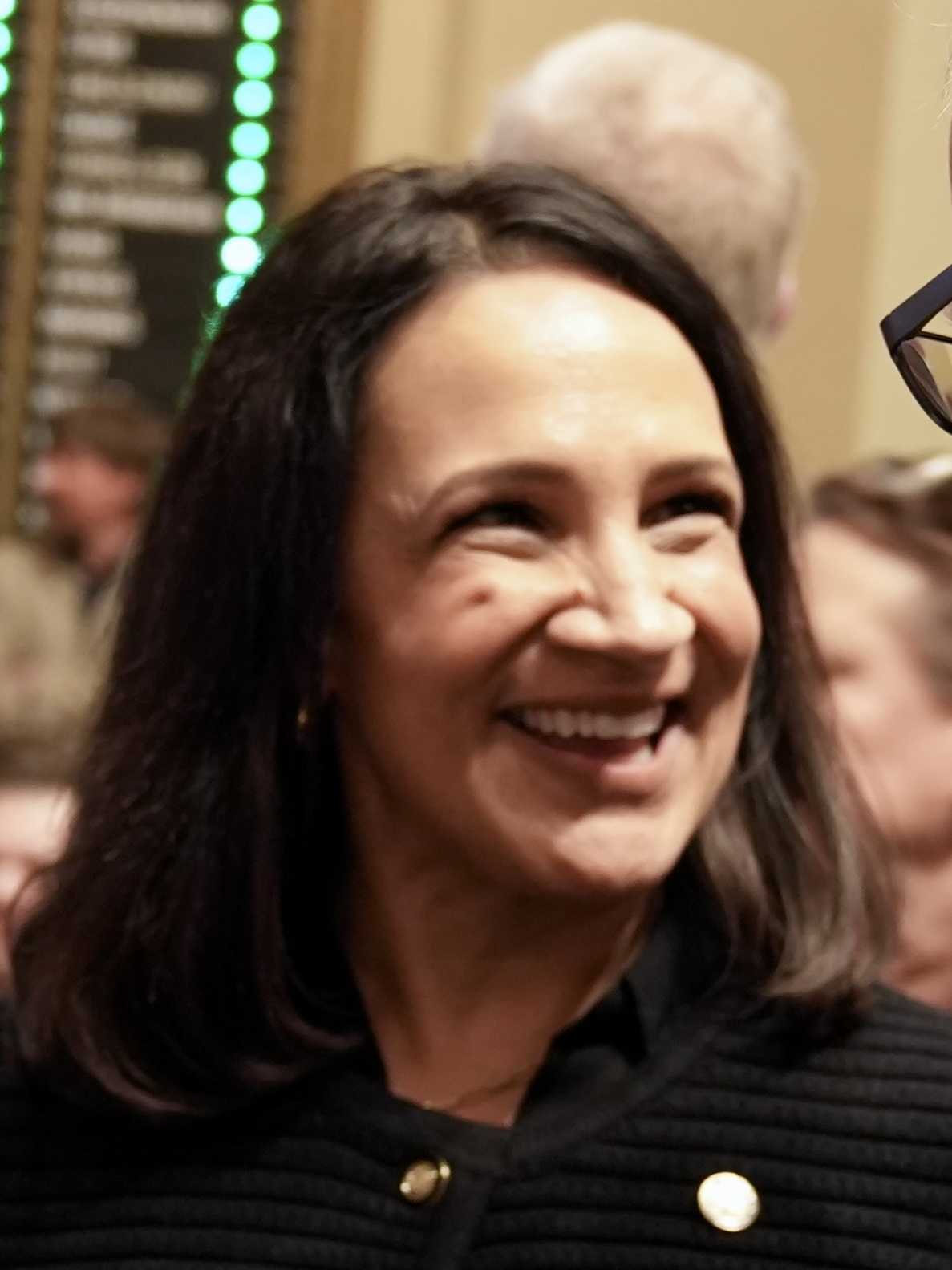

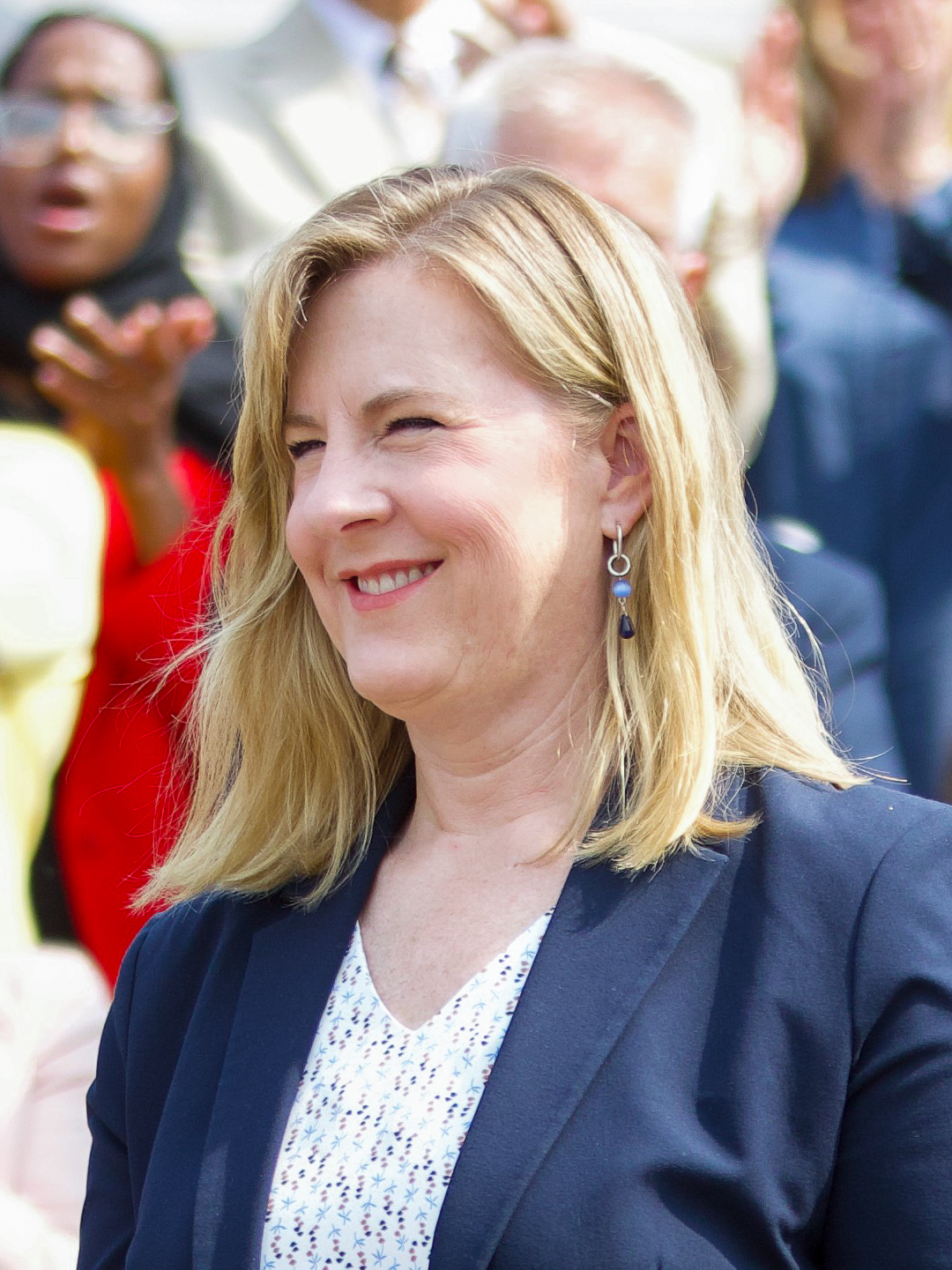
	Majority party	Minority party
Leader	Lisa Demuth	Melissa Hortman
Party	Republican	Democratic (DFL)
Leader since	January 3, 2023	January 3, 2017
Leader's seat	13A–Cold Spring	34B–Brooklyn Park
Last election	64 seats, 48.29%	70 seats, 50.91%
Seats won	67	67
Seats after	67	66 (Note: One DFL winner's election was invalidated due to residency issues, and a vacancy existed until a new DFL candidate was elected on March 11, 2025.)
Seat change	▲3	▼3
Popular vote	1,530,797	1,545,213
Percentage	49.48%	49.95%
Swing	▲1.19 pp	▼0.96 pp
Speaker before election
Melissa Hortman
Democratic (DFL)
Elected Speaker
Lisa Demuth
Republican

The 2024 Minnesota House of Representatives election was held in the U.S. state of Minnesota on November 5, 2024, to elect members to the House of Representatives of the 94th Minnesota Legislature. Primaries took place on August 13, 2024.

In the previous legislature, the Democratic-Farmer-Labor Party (DFL) leveraged their existing trifecta to enact significant legislative changes, including paid family leave, universal free school meals, a progressive child tax credit, increased sales and gas taxes for housing and transportation respectively, codified abortion rights, established a commission to redesign the state flag, and eliminated public university tuition for families earning under $85,000. The slim majorities held by the DFL were maintained by narrow victories in key battleground districts. They won control of the chamber following the 2018 election and entered this cycle with a majority of five seats.

The DFL lost three seats in Greater Minnesota to the Republicans, resulting in a tie, with both parties winning 67 seats. Two seats, in 14B in Saint Cloud and 54A in Shakopee, were won by the DFL within a 0.5% margin and held hand recounts, which confirmed the initial winners.

Republicans challenged three seat results in court. In District 54A, 21 ballots went missing due to human error on the first day of absentee ballot processing, and the margin between candidates was only 15 votes after a recount. The judge ruled in favor of Democratic candidate Tabke, denying the Republican request for a special election.

In District 40B, Republicans successfully invalidated DFL winner Curtis Johnson's election certificate. The judge ruled that Johnson did not meet residency requirements and was thus ineligible to take the oath of office. This temporarily shifted the House majority to 67–66 in favor of Republicans until a special election was held, which shifted it back to 67–67. DFL representatives held a boycott of the first three weeks of the legislative sessions, denying the Republicans a quorum, until the two parties made a power sharing agreement on February 5. On February 6, Lisa Demuth was elected as speaker.

== Outgoing incumbents ==
Retiring members DFL member retiring Republican member retiring

=== Retiring ===
- Jamie Becker-Finn (DFL–Roseville), representing district 40B since 2016, retired.
- Brian Daniels (R–Faribault), representing district 19A since 2014, retired.
- Matt Grossell (R–Clearbrook), representing district 2A since 2016, retired.
- Hodan Hassan (DFL–Minneapolis), representing district 62B since 2018, retired.
- Frank Hornstein, (DFL–Minneapolis), representing district 61A since 2012, (Note: Previously elected to the 60B district in 2002) retired.
- Shane Hudella (R–Hastings), representing district 41B since 2022, retired.
- Debra Kiel (R–Crookston), representing district 1B since 2010, retired.
- Dave Lislegard (DFL–Aurora), representing district 7B since 2022, (Note: Previously elected to the 6B district in 2018) retired.
- Michael Nelson (DFL–Brooklyn Park), representing district 38A since 2022, (Note: Previously elected to the 40A district in 2012, and 46A district in 2002) retired.
- Anne Neu Brindley (R–North Branch), representing district 28B since 2022, (Note: Previously elected to the 32B district in 2017) retired.
- Jerry Newton (DFL–Coon Rapids), representing district 35B since 2022, (Note: Prior to a term in the state senate from 2017–2023, previously elected to the 37A district in 2012 and 49B district in 2008) retired.
- Gene Pelowski (DFL–Winona), representing district 26A since 2022, (Note: Previously elected to the 28A district in 2012, 31A district in 2002, 32A district in 1992, 34B district in 1986) retired.
- John Petersburg (R–Waseca), representing district 19B since 2022, (Note: Previously elected to the 24A district in 2012) retired.
- Brian Pfarr (R–Le Sueur), representing district 22B since 2022, (Note: Previously elected to the 20A district in 2020) retired.
- Laurie Pryor (DFL–Minnetonka), representing district 49A since 2022, (Note: Previously elected to the 48A district in 2016) retired.
- Dean Urdahl, 16A (R–Grove City), representing district 16A since 2022, (Note: Previously elected to the 18A district in 2012 and 18B district in 2002) retired.

=== Seeking other office ===
- Mark Wiens (R–Lake Elmo), representing district 41A since 2022, ran for Washington County commissioner in the 3rd district but lost the primary.

=== Lost renomination ===
- Brian Johnson (R–Cambridge), representing district 28A since 2022, (Note: Previously elected to the 32A district in 2012) lost renomination to Jimmy Gordon (R–Isanti).

=== Vacated ===
- Heather Edelson (DFL–Edina), representing district 50A since 2022, (Note: Previously elected to the 49A district in 2018) resigned her seat on May 28, 2024, after being elected in a special election to the Hennepin County Board of Commissioners.
- Pat Garofalo, 58B (R–Farmington), representing district 58B since 2012, (Note: Previously elected to the 36B district in 2004) resigned his seat on July 14, 2024.
- Liz Olson, 8A (DFL–Duluth), representing district 8A since 2022, (Note: Previously elected to the 7B district in 2016) resigned her seat on July 5, 2025, after being hired by the McKnight Foundation.

== Summary ==
Party	Candidates	Votes			Seats		
Party	Candidates	No.	%	±	No.	±	%
Minnesota Democratic–Farmer–Labor Party	133	1,545,213	49.95	-0.96	67	–3	50.0
Republican Party of Minnesota	128	1,530,797	49.48	+1.19	67	+3	50.0
Independence–Alliance Party of Minnesota	1	3,517	0.11	-0.07	0	±0	0.0
Libertarian Party of Minnesota	1	1,298	0.04	+0.01	0	±0	0.0
Green Party of Minnesota	1	3,284	0.11	+0.11	0	±0	0.0
Independent	2	1,560	0.05	-0.03	0	±0	0.0
Write-in	N/A	7,814	0.25	-0.09	0	±0	0.0
Total		3,093,483	100	N/A	134	N/A	100
Source: Minnesota Secretary of State

=== Close races ===
Major Minnesota news outlets published lists of House districts that were expected to be competitive in 2024 based on past results and campaign spending. The Minnesota Star Tribune considered 15 races competitive, MPR News listed 14 as districts to watch, and MinnPost and the Minnesota Reformer both cited 16 districts.

21 districts were decided by margins below 10 points, 16 races under 5 points, and 4 separated by less than 1%. The closest contest was in District 54A, where Brad Tabke led by 14 votes on election night (0.06%); this margin was extended to 15 votes after a hand recount. Districts 54A and 14B both saw their results confirmed in recounts.

Seats where the margin of victory was under 10%:

Seats decided by under 10% margin
#	Winning party	Winning candidate	District	Vote margin	Percent margin	Notes
1	DFL	Brad Tabke	54A	15	0.06%	(Note: After an initial 14-vote margin, a hand recount confirmed Tabke's victory, extending his lead by one vote.)
2	R	Natalie Zeleznikar	3B	159	0.60%	
3	DFL	Lucille Rehm	48B	225	0.87%	
4	DFL	Dan Wolgamott	14B	191	0.96%	(Note: A hand recount confirmed Wolgamott's victory, reducing his lead by one vote.)
5	R	Wayne Johnson	41A	327	1.09%	
6	DFL	Kari Rehrauer	35B	280	1.22%	
7	DFL	Matt Norris	32B	410	1.73%	
8	R	Tom Dippel	41B	510	2.08%	
9	DFL	Josiah Hill	33B	718	2.70%	
10	R	Jeff Dotseth	11A	664	2.78%	
11	DFL	Brion Curran	36B	825	3.28%	
12	R	Erica Schwartz	18A	802	3.37%	Gain
13	DFL	Zack Stephenson	35A	872	3.82%	
14	R	Bidal Duran	2A	851	3.83%	
15	R	Jeff Witte	57B	1,261	4.79%	
16	DFL	Kristi Pursell	58A	1,258	4.95%	
17	R	Aaron Repinski	26A	1,324	5.70%	Gain
18	DFL	Jessica Hanson	55A	1,538	6.77%	
19	R	Danny Nadeau	34A	2,021	7.08%	
20	R	Elliot Engen	36A	2,284	8.23%	
21	DFL	Ethan Cha	47B	2,335	8.95%	

== Campaign ==
=== Primary elections ===
A primary election was held in 19 districts to nominate Republican and DFL candidates. 15 Republican nominations and seven DFL nominations were contested. Eight incumbents faced challenges for their party's nomination, with Brian Johnson (R-Cambridge) being the only incumbent who lost their party's nomination.

=== Predictions ===
Source	Ranking	As of
CNalysis	Likely D	October 30, 2024

=== Polling ===
Poll source	Date(s) administered	Sample	MOE	DFL	Rep.	Other	Undecided
KSTP/SurveyUSA	October 24–28, 2024	728 (LV)	± 4.0%	48%	43%	1%	7%
KSTP/SurveyUSA	September 23–26, 2024	646 (LV)	± 4.3%	47%	43%	3%	8%
KSTP/SurveyUSA	August 27–29, 2024	635 (LV)	± 4.5%	48%	43%	2%	8%
KSTP/SurveyUSA	July 23–25, 2024	656 (LV)	± 4.1%	50%	40%	2%	7%
KSTP/SurveyUSA	June 12–16, 2024	626 (LV)	± 4.5%	47%	45%	1%	7%
KSTP/SurveyUSA	May 8–11, 2024	625 (LV)	± 4.3%	43%	45%	4%	8%
KSTP/SurveyUSA	April 3–7, 2024	608 (LV)	± 4.9%	44%	45%	3%	8%
KSTP/SurveyUSA	February 23–28, 2024	1,603 (LV)	± 3.0%	46%	41%	3%	11%

== Results by district ==
Source: Minnesota Secretary of State

=== District 1A ===
Incumbent Republican John Burkel ran for re-election. He defeated DFLer James Sceville by a wide margin.

District 1A vote share by county

District 1A general election
Party	Candidate	Votes	%
Republican	John Burkel (incumbent)	17,420	76.07
Democratic (DFL)	James Sceville	5,466	23.87
Write-in		14	0.06
Total votes		22,900	100.0
Republican hold			

=== District 1B ===
Incumbent Republican Debra Kiel declined to seek re-election. Republican Steve Gander filed to succeed her and defeated DFLer Mike Christopherson by a wide margin.

District 1B vote share by county

District 1B general election
Party	Candidate	Votes	%
Republican	Steve Gander	13,939	67.20
Democratic (DFL)	Mike Christopherson	6,791	32.74
Write-in		14	0.07
Total votes		20,744	100.0
Republican hold			

=== District 2A ===
Incumbent Republican Matt Grossell declined to seek re-election. Republican Bidal Duran Jr. filed to succeed him and defeated DFLer Reed Olson by a margin of 3.83 points.

District 2A vote share by precinct

District 2A general election
Party	Candidate	Votes	%
Republican	Bidal Duran Jr.	11,518	51.86
Democratic (DFL)	Reed Olson	10,667	48.03
Write-in		26	0.12
Total votes		22,211	100.0
Republican hold			

=== District 2B ===
Incumbent Republican Matt Bliss ran for re-election. He defeated DFLer Michael Reyes by a wide margin.

District 2B vote share by county

District 2B general election
Party	Candidate	Votes	%
Republican	Matt Bliss (incumbent)	14,372	63.73
Democratic (DFL)	Michael Reyes	8,168	36.22
Write-in		10	0.04
Total votes		22,550	100
Republican hold			

=== District 3A ===
Incumbent Republican Roger Skraba ran for re-election. He defeated DFLer and mayor of International Falls, Minnesota Harley Droba and Rich Tru, the nominee for the Forward Party, by a 14-point margin.

District 3A vote share by precinct

District 3A general election
Party	Candidate	Votes	%
Republican	Roger Skraba (incumbent)	14,443	55.54
Democratic (DFL)	Harley Droba	10,779	41.45
Forward	Rich Tru	712	2.74
Write-in		73	0.28
Total votes		26,007	100

=== District 3B ===
Incumbent Republican Natalie Zeleznikar ran for re-election. She defeated DFLer and former judge and nephew of former legislator Willard Munger, Mark Munger by a 160-vote, 0.60% margin.

The district was targeted by both parties due to its narrow margins in 2022, when Zeleznikar defeated long-time incumbent Mary Murphy by a margin of 33 votes. In the campaign, high amounts of outside spending came into the district in support of both candidates, with spending in the district being the fifth most expensive race in the house of representatives. During the campaign, both candidates maintained a friendly tone and stuck to traditional campaign messaging.

District 3B general election
Party	Candidate	Votes	%
Republican	Natalie Zeleznikar (incumbent)	13,481	50.25
Democratic (DFL)	Mark Munger	13,321	49.65
Write-in		27	0.10
Total votes		26,828	100.00

=== District 4A ===
Incumbent DFLer Heather Keeler ran for re-election. She defeated Republican Joshua Zincke by a 17-point margin.

District 4A general election
Party	Candidate	Votes	%
Democratic (DFL)	Heather Keeler (incumbent)	11,072	58.50
Republican	Joshua Zincke	7,822	41.33
Write-in		32	0.17
Total votes		18,926	100.00

=== District 4B ===
Incumbent Republican Jim Joy ran for re-election. He defeated DFLer Thaddeus Laugisch by a wide margin.

District 4B general election
Party	Candidate	Votes	%
Republican	Jim Joy (incumbent)	15,273	66.41
Democratic (DFL)	Thaddeus Laugisch	7,709	33.52
Write-in		16	0.07
Total votes		22,998	100.00

=== District 5A ===
Incumbent Republican Krista Knudsen ran for re-election. She defeated DFLer Brian Hobson by a wide margin.

District 5A general election
Party	Candidate	Votes	%
Republican	Krista Knudsen	18,885	71.34
Democratic (DFL)	Brian Hobson	7,551	28.57
Write-in		22	0.08
Total votes		26,428	100.00

=== District 5B ===
Incumbent Republican Mike Wiener ran for re-election. He defeated DFLer Gregg Hendrickson by a wide margin.

District 5B general election
Party	Candidate	Votes	%
Republican	Mike Wiener (incumbent)	17,604	75.38
Democratic (DFL)	Gregg Hendrickson	5,729	24.53
Write-in		21	0.09
Total votes		23,354	100.00

=== District 6A ===
Incumbent Republican Ben Davis ran for re-election. He defeated DFLer Earl Butenhoff by a wide margin.

District 6A general election
Party	Candidate	Votes	%
Republican	Ben Davis (incumbent)	17,765	66.04
Democratic (DFL)	Earl Butenhoff	9,116	33.89
Write-in		19	0.07
Total votes		26,900	100.00

=== District 6B ===
Incumbent Republican Josh Heintzeman ran for re-election. He defeated Matthew Eric Zinda in the Republican primary and then defeated DFLer Emily LeClaire and independent Troy Kenneth Scheffler in the general election by a wide margin.

District 6B Republican primary
Party	Candidate	Votes	%
Republican	Josh Heintzeman (incumbent)	2,032	91.04%
Republican	Matthew Eric Zinda	200	8.96%
Total votes		2,232	100%

District 6B general election
Party	Candidate	Votes	%
Republican	Josh Heintzeman (incumbent)	15,744	63.40
Democratic (DFL)	Emily LeClaire	8,209	33.06
Americans First	Troy Kenneth Scheffler	848	3.41
Write-in		32	0.13
Total votes		24,833	100.00

=== District 7A ===
Incumbent Republican Spencer Igo ran for re-election, he defeated DFLer Aron Schaser by a 21-point margin.

District 7A general election
Party	Candidate	Votes	%
Republican	Spencer Igo (incumbent)	14,422	60.31
Democratic (DFL)	Aron Schnaser	9,467	39.59
Write-in		23	0.1
Total votes		23,912	100.00

=== District 7B ===
Incumbent DFLer Dave Lislegard declined to seek re-election. Republican Cal Warwas defeated Matt Matasich in the primary and went on to defeat DFLer Lorrie Jantopoulos by a 13-point margin, flipping the seat.

District 7B Republican primary
Party	Candidate	Votes	%
Republican	Cal Warwas	2,588	84.22%
Republican	Matt Matasich	485	15.78%
Total votes		3,073	100%

District 7B general election
Party	Candidate	Votes	%
Republican	Cal Warwas	13,781	56.34
Democratic (DFL)	Lorrie Janatopoulos	10,655	43.56
Write-in		23	0.09
Total votes		24,459	100.00
Republican gain from Democratic (DFL)			

=== District 8A ===
Incumbent DFLer Liz Olson declined to seek re-election. Two DFLers and one Republican filed to succeed her. DFLer Peter Johnson defeated Jordan Johnson in the primary and went on to defeat Republican Mark McGrew by a wide margin.

District 8A DFL primary
Party	Candidate	Votes	%
Democratic (DFL)	Peter Johnson	2,947	82.76%
Democratic (DFL)	Jordon Johnson	614	17.24%
Total votes		3,561	100%

District 8A general election
Party	Candidate	Votes	%
Democratic (DFL)	Peter Johnson	15,006	68.22
Republican	Mark McGrew	6,962	31.65
Write-in		29	0.13
Total votes		21,997	100.0

=== District 8B ===
DFLer Liish Kozlowski ran for re-election. They faced Republican software consultant Shawn Savela, who had defeated architect Timothy L. Meyer in the Republican primary. Kozlowski defeated Savela by a wide margin.

District 8B Republican primary
Party	Candidate	Votes	%
Republican	Shawn Savela	908	61.81%
Republican	Timothy L. Meyer	561	38.19%
Total votes		1,469	100%

District 8B general election
Party	Candidate	Votes	%
Democratic (DFL)	Liish Kozlowski (incumbent)	17,440	68.53
Republican	Shawn Savela	7,954	31.25
Write-in		55	0.22
Total votes		25,449	100.00

=== District 9A ===
Incumbent Republican Jeff Backer ran for re-election. He defeated farmer Boone Carlson in the primary. He went on to defeat DFLer Michael Ziomko in the general election by a wide margin.

District 9A Republican primary
Party	Candidate	Votes	%
Republican	Jeff Backer (incumbent)	3,151	65.73%
Republican	Boone Carlson	1,643	34.27%
Total votes		4,794	100%

District 9A general election
Party	Candidate	Votes	%
Republican	Jeff Backer (incumbent)	15,587	68.76
Democratic (DFL)	Michael Ziomko	7,042	31.06
Write-in		41	0.18
Total votes		22,670	100.00

=== District 9B ===
Incumbent Republican Tom Murphy ran for re-election. He defeated DFLer Jason Satter by a wide margin.

==== Results ====
District 9B general election
Party	Candidate	Votes	%
Republican	Tom Murphy	19,366	71.61
Democratic (DFL)	Jason Satter	7,661	28.33
Write-in		18	0.07
Total votes		27,045	100.00

=== District 10A ===
Incumbent Republican Ron Kresha ran for re-election. He faced first time candidate Diane Webb-Skillings, who ran as a "Make America Great Again" Republican. Kresha was criticized as being insufficiently conservative due to his views on the January 6 United States Capitol attack and immigration. Additionally, Kresha was unable to secure the Republican endorsement in his bid for re-election. He defeated Webb-Skillings by a 35-vote margin. Kresha went on to defeat DFLer Julia Hipp by a wide margin.

District 10A Republican primary
Party	Candidate	Votes	%
Republican	Ron Kresha (incumbent)	2,295	50.38%
Republican	Diane Webb-Skillings	2,260	49.62%
Total votes		4,555	100%

District 10A general election
Party	Candidate	Votes	%
Republican	Ron Kresha (incumbent)	17,957	71.12
Democratic (DFL)	Julia Samsal Hipp	7,159	28.35
Write-in		134	0.53
Total votes		25,250	100.00

=== District 10B ===
Incumbent Republican Isaac Schultz ran for re-election. He defeated DFLer JoEllen Burns by a wide margin.

District 10B general election
Party	Candidate	Votes	%
Republican	Isaac Schultz (incumbent)	19,959	79.64
Democratic (DFL)	JoEllen Burns	5,079	20.27
Write-in		24	0.10
Total votes		25,062	100.00

=== District 11A ===
Incumbent Republican Jeff Dotseth ran for re-election. He defeated DFLer Pete Radosevich by a three-point margin.

District 11A general election
Party	Candidate	Votes	%
Republican	Jeff Dotseth (incumbent)	12,252	51.19
Democratic (DFL)	Pete Radosevich	11,588	48.41
Write-in		96	0.40
Total votes		23,936	100.00

=== District 11B ===
Incumbent Republican Nathan Nelson ran for re-election. He defeated DFLer Eric Olson in the general election.

District 11B general election
Party	Candidate	Votes	%
Republican	Nathan Nelson (incumbent)	16,047	68.62
Democratic (DFL)	Eric Olson	7,320	31.30
Write-in		20	0.09
Total votes		23,387	100.00

=== District 12A ===
Incumbent Republican Paul Anderson ran for re-election. He defeated DFLer Becky K. Parker.

District 12A vote share by county

District 12A general election
Party	Candidate	Votes	%
Republican	Paul Anderson (incumbent)	17,110	73.80
Democratic (DFL)	Becky K. Parker	6,058	26.13
Write-in		15	0.06
Total votes		23,183	100.00

=== District 12B ===
Incumbent Republican Mary Franson ran for re-election. She defeated DFLer Judd Hoff by a wide margin.

District 12B general election
Party	Candidate	Votes	%
Republican	Mary Franson (incumbent)	18,571	76.73
Democratic (DFL)	Judd Hoff	4,946	20.44
Write-in		685	2.83
Total votes		24,202	100.00

=== District 13A ===
Incumbent Republican and House minority leader Lisa Demuth ran for re-election. She defeated DFLer Cindy Aho.

District 13A general election
Party	Candidate	Votes	%
Republican	Lisa Demuth (incumbent)	19,215	75.30
Democratic (DFL)	Cindy Aho	6,282	24.62
Write-in		20	0.08
Total votes		25,517	100.00

=== District 13B ===
Incumbent Republican Tim O'Driscoll ran for re-election. He defeated DFLer Dusty Bolstad.

District 13B general election
Party	Candidate	Votes	%
Republican	Tim O'Driscoll (incumbent)	16,467	68.63
Democratic (DFL)	Dusty Bolstad	7,505	31.28
Write-in		23	0.10
Total votes		23,995	100.00

=== District 14A ===
Incumbent Republican Bernie Perryman ran for re-election. He defeated DFL business owner Abdi Daisane by a 13-point margin.

First-term representative Bernie Perryman won the 2022 election over her DFL opponent by 199 votes. Perryman was a small business owner and chair of the St. Cloud Chamber of Commerce. She was also a regional vice president for Anheuser-Busch for 20 years.

Abdi Daisane, a Somali American business owner, was the DFL challenger. Daisane moved to St. Cloud in 2013 to attend St. Cloud State University. His priorities, according to his campaign website, included supporting affordable housing, increasing funding for the state's child care centers and advocating for climate justice.

Another candidate, Tami Calhoun, initially ran before withdrawing from the race.

District 14A general election
Party	Candidate	Votes	%
Republican	Bernie Perryman (incumbent)	10,967	56.31
Democratic (DFL)	Abdi Daisane	8,463	43.46
Write-in		45	0.23
Total votes		19,475	100.00

=== District 14B ===
Incumbent DFLer Dan Wolgamott ran for re-election. He defeated Republican Sue Elk by a 200-vote margin.

District 14B general election
Party	Candidate	Votes	%
Democratic (DFL)	Dan Wolgamott (incumbent)	10,004	50.36
Republican	Sue Ek	9,814	49.40
Write-in		48	0.24
Total votes		19,867	100.00
A hand recount confirmed the results.

=== District 15A ===
District 15A is in southwest Minnesota, including Lac Qui Parle, Lyon, and Yellow Medicine counties, and the city and township of Granite Falls.

==== Candidates ====
- Anthony M Studemann (DFL)
- Chris Swedzinski (R), incumbent

==== Results ====
District 15A general election
Party	Candidate	Votes	%
Republican	Chris Swedzinski (incumbent)	16,111	71.68
Democratic (DFL)	Anthony M Studemann	6,347	28.24
Write-in		18	0.08
Total votes		22,476	100.00

=== District 15B ===
District 15B is in southwest Minnesota, comprising Brown County, Redwood County, and the northwest of Blue Earth County.

==== Candidates ====
- Tom Kuster (DFL)
- Paul Torkelson (R), incumbent

==== Results ====
District 15B general election
Party	Candidate	Votes	%
Republican	Paul Torkelson (incumbent)	16,814	72.65
Democratic (DFL)	Tom Kuster	6,315	27.29
Write-in		14	0.06
Total votes		23,143	100.00

=== District 16A ===
District 16A is in western Minnesota. Incumbent Dean Urdahl (R), who took 73% of the vote in 2022, did not run for re-election. Republican Scott Van Binsbergen won the election, taking 71.6% of the vote.

==== Candidates ====
- Kathy Hegstad (DFL)
- Scott Van Binsbergen (R)

==== Results ====
District 16A general election
Party	Candidate	Votes	%
Republican	Scott Van Binsbergen	16,039	71.60
Democratic (DFL)	Kathy Hegstad	6,338	28.29
Write-in		24	0.11
Total votes		22,401	100.00
Republican hold			

=== District 16B ===
District 16B is in Kandiyohi County in west-central Minnesota.

==== Candidates ====
- Josiah Ampian (DFL)
- Dave Baker (R), incumbent

==== Results ====
District 16B general election
Party	Candidate	Votes	%
Republican	Dave Baker (incumbent)	16,847	76.10
Democratic (DFL)	Josiah Ampian	5,271	23.81
Write-in		20	0.09
Total votes		22,138	100.00

=== District 17A ===
District 17A is located in south-central Minnesota, including the city of Hutchinson.

==== Candidates ====
- Dawn Gillman (R), incumbent
- Chad Tschimperle (DFL)

===== Eliminated in primary =====
- Wayne Olson (R)

==== Results ====
District 17A Republican primary
Party	Candidate	Votes	%
Republican	Dawn Gillman (incumbent)	2,093	84.02%
Republican	Wayne Olson	398	15.98%
Total votes		2,491	100%

District 17A general election
Party	Candidate	Votes	%
Republican	Dawn Gillman (incumbent)	17,053	71.03
Democratic (DFL)	Chad Tschimperle	6,930	28.87
Write-in		24	0.10
Total votes		24,007	100.00

=== District 17B ===
District 17B is located in Carver, Sibley and McLeod counties, covering southwest exurbs of the Twin Cities.

==== Candidates ====
- Bobbie Harder (R), incumbent
- Jennifer Nuesse (DFL)

==== Results ====
District 17B general election
Party	Candidate	Votes	%
Republican	Bobbie Harder (incumbent)	17,424	70.03
Democratic (DFL)	Jennifer Nuesse	7,431	29.87
Write-in		25	0.10
Total votes		24,880	100.00

=== District 18A ===
Incumbent DFLer Jeff Brand ran for re-election. He was defeated by Republican business owner Erica Schwartz by a three-point margin.

Brand was previously a St. Peter City Council member and board member of the Coalition of Greater Minnesota Cities. Erica Schwartz lives in Nicollet, where she works at a local convenience store owned by her husband; Schwartz ran on inflation, law enforcement and education. Schwartz was heard in a side conversation after a fundraiser saying that Democrats were leading the U.S. towards another Holocaust. She apologized for the comment.

District 18A general election
Party	Candidate	Votes	%
Republican	Erica Schwartz	12,282	51.60
Democratic (DFL)	Jeff Brand (incumbent)	11,480	48.23
Write-in		42	0.18
Total votes		23,804	100.00
Republican gain from Democratic (DFL)			

=== District 18B ===
Incumbent DFLer Luke Frederick ran for re-election. He defeated Republican Dar Vosburg by an 11-point margin.

District 18B general election
Party	Candidate	Votes	%
Democratic (DFL)	Luke Frederick (incumbent)	10,892	55.64
Republican	Dar Vosburg	8,650	44.18
Write-in		35	0.18
Total votes		19,577	100.00

=== District 19A ===
District 19A is in and around Faribault in southern Minnesota. Incumbent Brian Daniels (R), who won with 64.9% of votes in 2022, did not run for re-election. Republican Keith Allen held the seat with 64.6% of the vote.

==== Candidates ====
- Keith Allen (R)
- Jessica Navarro (DFL)

==== Results ====
District 19A general election
Party	Candidate	Votes	%
Republican	Keith Allen	13,366	64.59
Democratic (DFL)	Jessica Navarro	7,311	35.33
Write-in		16	0.08
Total votes		20,693	100.00
Republican hold			

=== District 19B ===
District 19B is located in and around Owatonna in southern Minnesota. Incumbent John Petersburg (R), who won 70% of votes in 2022, did not run for re-election. Republican Thomas J. Sexton won the general election with 66.03% of the vote.

==== Candidates ====
- Edelgard Fernandez Mejia (DFL)
- Thomas J. Sexton (R)

===== Eliminated in primary =====
- Michael J. Ditlevson (R)

==== Results ====
District 19B Republican primary
Party	Candidate	Votes	%
Republican	Thomas J. Sexton	1,740	66.54%
Republican	Michael J. Ditlevson	875	33.46%
Total votes		2,615	100%

District 19B general election
Party	Candidate	Votes	%
Republican	Thomas J. Sexton	14,620	66.03
Democratic (DFL)	Edelgard Fernandez Mejia	7,495	33.85
Write-in		28	0.13
Total votes		22,143	100.00
hold			

=== District 20A ===
District 20A is located in Southeastern Minnesota along the Mississippi River, including the city of Red Wing.

==== Candidates ====
- Pam Altendorf (R), incumbent
- Heather Arndt (DFL)

==== Results ====
District 20A general election
Party	Candidate	Votes	%
Republican	Pam Altendorf (incumbent)	14,333	57.60
Democratic (DFL)	Heather Arndt	10,535	42.34
Write-in		15	0.06
Total votes		24,883	100.00

=== District 20B ===
District 20B is in Southeastern Minnesota, including areas north and east of Rochester.

==== Candidates ====
- Michael Hutchinson (DFL)
- Steven E Jacob (R), incumbent

==== Results ====
District 20B general election
Party	Candidate	Votes	%
Republican	Steven E Jacob (incumbent)	16,854	66.85
Democratic (DFL)	Michael Hutchinson	8,333	33.05
Write-in		24	0.10
Total votes		25,211	100.00

=== District 21A ===
District 21A is in the southwest corner of the state. Incumbent Joe Schomacker (R) has been serving since 2011, and was re-elected with 83 percent of the vote.

==== Candidates ====
- Creedence Petroff (I–A)
- Joe Schomacker (R), incumbent

==== Endorsements ====
Joe Schomacker

Organizations

- Minnesota Citizens Concerned for Life
- NRA Political Victory Fund
Creedence Petroff

State officials

- Jesse Ventura, former governor of Minnesota

Organizations

- Alliance Party
- FairVote
- Independence-Alliance Party
- MN Cann Political Action
- Planned Parenthood of Minnesota Political Action Fund
- Reform Party

==== Results ====
District 21A general election
Party	Candidate	Votes	%
Republican	Joe Schomacker (incumbent)	18,669	83.89
Independence	Creedence Petroff	3,517	15.80
Write-in		67	0.30
Total votes		22,253	100.00
Republican hold			

=== District 21B ===
==== Candidates ====
- Marj Fogelman (R), incumbent
- Jon Wilson (DFL), mayor of St. James

==== Results ====
District 21B general election
Party	Candidate	Votes	%
Republican	Marj Fogelman (incumbent)	11,983	66.30
Democratic (DFL)	Jon Wilson	6,078	33.63
Write-in		12	0.07
Total votes		18,073	100.00

=== District 22A ===
==== Candidates ====
- Bjorn Olson (R), incumbent
- Marisa Ulmen (DFL)

==== Results ====
District 22A general election
Party	Candidate	Votes	%
Republican	Bjorn Olson (incumbent)	15,699	69.42
Democratic (DFL)	Marisa Ulmen	6,896	30.49
Write-in		21	0.09
Total votes		22,616	100.00

=== District 22B ===
District 22B is in the southwest of Minnesota, including parts of Blue Earth, Le Sueuer, Rice, and Scott counties. Incumbent Brian Pfarr (R) did not run for re-election. Republican Terry Stier won the seat with 68.7% of the vote.

==== Candidates ====
- Sara Nett-Torgrimson (DFL)
- Terry Stier (R)

==== Results ====
District 22B general election
Party	Candidate	Votes	%
Republican	Terry Stier	17,053	68.74
Democratic (DFL)	Sara Nett-Torgrimson	7,740	31.20
Write-in		16	0.06
Total votes		24,809	100.00
Republican hold			

=== District 23A ===
==== Candidates ====
- Peggy Bennett (R), incumbent
- Joe Staloch (DFL)

==== Results ====
District 23A general election
Party	Candidate	Votes	%
Republican	Peggy Bennett (incumbent)	15,554	67.75
Democratic (DFL)	Joe Staloch	7,379	32.14
Write-in		26	0.11
Total votes		22,959	100.00

=== District 23B ===
==== Candidates ====
- Patricia Mueller (R)
- Joseph Pacovsky (DFL)

==== Results ====
District 23B general election
Party	Candidate	Votes	%
Republican	Patricia Mueller	11,465	58.34
Democratic (DFL)	Joseph Pacovsky	8,174	41.60
Write-in		12	0.06
Total votes		19,651	100.00

=== District 24A ===
==== Candidates ====
- Heather Holmes, school board member (DFL)
- Duane Quam (R), incumbent

==== Results ====
District 24A general election
Party	Candidate	Votes	%
Republican	Duane Quam (incumbent)	15,661	63.40
Democratic (DFL)	Heather Holmes	9,019	36.51
Write-in		23	0.09
Total votes		24,703	100.00

=== District 24B ===
==== Candidates ====
- Tina Liebling (DFL), incumbent
- Dan Sepeda (R)

===== Eliminated in primary =====
- Jesse O'Driscoll (R)

==== Results ====
District 24B Republican primary
Party	Candidate	Votes	%
Republican	Dan Sepeda	842	57.16%
Republican	Jesse O'Driscoll	631	42.84%
Total votes		1,473	100%

District 24B general election
Party	Candidate	Votes	%
Republican	Dan Sepeda	9,369	42.10
Democratic (DFL)	Tina Liebling (incumbent)	12,863	57.80
Write-in		21	0.09
Total votes		22,253	100.00

=== District 25A ===
==== Candidates ====
- Kim Hicks (DFL), incumbent
- Ken Navitsky (R)

==== Results ====
District 25A general election
Party	Candidate	Votes	%
Republican	Ken Navitsky	10,260	43.89
Democratic (DFL)	Kim Hicks (incumbent)	13,085	55.98
Write-in		29	0.12
Total votes		23,374	100.00

=== District 25B ===
==== Candidates ====
- Wes Lund (R)
- Andy Smith (DFL), incumbent

==== Results ====
District 25B general election
Party	Candidate	Votes	%
Republican	Wes Lund	7,184	35.79
Democratic (DFL)	Andy Smith (incumbent)	12,847	64.01
Write-in		40	0.20
Total votes		20,071	100.00

=== District 26A ===
District 26A includes the college town of Winona, the towns Goodview and Stockton, and surrounding townships. The district was predicted as a potential flip for Republicans. Longtime representative Gene Pelowski (DFL) did not seek re-election after his 19th term. The seat showed one of the largest rightward shifts in the state, with Republican Aaron Repinski winning a seat that Pelowski had won by over 10 points.

Republican candidate Aaron Repinski, a Winona City Council member, defeated DFL candidate Sarah Kruger, the chief of staff for FairVote Minnesota, after she had beaten Dwayne Voegeli, chair of the Winona County Board of Commissioners, in the primary.

==== Candidates ====
- Sarah Kruger (DFL)
- Aaron Repinski (R)

===== Eliminated in primary =====
- S. James Doerr (R)
- Dwayne Voegeli (DFL)

==== Results ====
District 26A DFL primary
Party	Candidate	Votes	%
Democratic (DFL)	Sarah Kruger	2,162	51.97%
Democratic (DFL)	Dwayne Voegeli	1,998	48.03%
Total votes		4,160	100%

District 26A Republican primary
Party	Candidate	Votes	%
Republican	Aaron Repinski	2,247	86.69%
Republican	S. James Doerr	345	13.31%
Total votes		2,592	100%

District 26A general election
Party	Candidate	Votes	%
Republican	Aaron Repinski	12,240	52.74
Democratic (DFL)	Sarah Kruger	10,916	47.04
Write-in		52	0.22
Total votes		23,208	100.00
Republican gain from Democratic (DFL)			

=== District 26B ===
District 26B is located in the southeast corner of the state and includes the cities of La Crescent, Chatfield, Caledonia, Spring Valley and Rushford. Long-time incumbent representative Greg Davids (R) ran for re-election; he narrowly won his primary after having lost the Republican Party's endorsement to newcomer Gary Steuart.

==== Candidates ====
- Gregory M. Davids (R), incumbent
- Allie Wolf (DFL)

===== Eliminated in primary =====
- Eric M. Leitzen (DFL)
- Gary M. Steuart (R)

===== Endorsements =====
Gary Steuart

Organizations

- Republican Party of Minnesota

==== Results ====
District 26B DFL primary
Party	Candidate	Votes	%
Democratic (DFL)	Allie Wolf	1,458	81.77
Democratic (DFL)	Eric Leitzen	325	18.23
Total votes		1,783	100

District 26B Republican primary
Party	Candidate	Votes	%
Republican	Gregory M. Davids (incumbent)	1,933	52.73
Republican	Gary M. Steuart	1,733	47.27
Total votes		3,666	100

District 26B general election
Party	Candidate	Votes	%
Republican	Gregory M. Davids (incumbent)	15,714	63.32
Democratic (DFL)	Allie Wolf	9,044	36.44
Write-in		59	0.24
Total votes		24,817	100

=== District 27A ===
==== Candidates ====
- Kathryn A. Geary (DFL)
- Shane Mekeland (R), incumbent

==== Results ====
District 27A general election
Party	Candidate	Votes	%
Republican	Shane Mekeland (incumbent)	17,597	71.38
Democratic (DFL)	Kathryn A. Geary	7,026	28.50
Write-in		31	0.13
Total votes		24,654	100

=== District 27B ===
District 27B covers parts of Anoka, Isanti, Sherburne, and Mille Lacs counties. It includes the cities of Princeton, Zimmerman, St. Francis, and Bethel.

==== Candidates ====
- Bryan Lawrence (R), incumbent
- Andrew Scouten (DFL)

==== Results ====
District 27B general election
Party	Candidate	Votes	%
Republican	Bryan Lawrence (incumbent)	18,229	74.09
Democratic (DFL)	Andrew Scouten	6,338	25.76
Write-in		36	0.15
Total votes		24,603	100

=== District 28A ===
District 28A includes parts of North Branch, Cambridge, and Isanti in Chisago and Isanti counties in eastern Minnesota. Incumbent representative Brian Johnson (R) lost the Republican primary to Isanti mayor Jimmy Gordon, who had won the GOP endorsement. Gordon took the seat with 68% of the vote.

==== Candidates ====
- Tim Dummer (DFL)
- Jimmy Gordon (R), mayor of Isanti

===== Eliminated in primary =====
- Brian Johnson (R), incumbent

===== Endorsements =====
James "Jimmy" Gordon

Organizations

- Republican Party of Minnesota

==== Results ====
District 28A Republican primary
Party	Candidate	Votes	%
Republican	Jimmy Gordon	2,561	65.99
Republican	Brian Johnson (incumbent)	1,320	34.01
Total votes		3,881	100

District 28A general election
Party	Candidate	Votes	%
Republican	Jimmy Gordon	17,550	68.11
Democratic (DFL)	Tim Dummer	8,163	31.68
Write-in		54	0.21
Total votes		25,767	100
Republican hold			

=== District 28B ===
District 28B covers most of Chisago County and includes Wyoming, Lindström, Center City, Chisago City, Taylors Falls, Shafer, Stacy, and eastern North Branch. It also covers the townships of Sunrise, Chisago Lake, Shafer, Amador, and Franconia. It was represented by Republican Anne Neu Brindley, who was first elected in a 2017 special election. She did not run for re-election in 2024.

==== Candidates ====
- Mary J Murphy (DFL)
- Max Rymer (R)

===== Endorsements =====
Max Rymer

State legislators

- Anne Neu, state representative

Organizations

- Republican Party of Minnesota

==== Results ====
District 28B general election
Party	Candidate	Votes	%
Republican	Max Rymer	16,768	65.06
Democratic (DFL)	Mary J Murphy	8,983	34.85
Write-in		22	0.09
Total votes		25,773	100

=== District 29A ===
==== Candidates ====
- Chris Brazelton (DFL)
- Joe McDonald (R), incumbent

==== Results ====
District 29A general election
Party	Candidate	Votes	%
Republican	Joe McDonald (incumbent)	18,788	70.74
Democratic (DFL)	Chris Brazelton	7,750	29.18
Write-in		21	0.08
Total votes		26,559	100

=== District 29B ===
==== Candidates ====
- Colton Kratky (DFL)
- Marion (O'Neill) Rarick (R), incumbent

==== Results ====
District 29B general election
Party	Candidate	Votes	%
Republican	Marion (O'Neill) Rarick	15,741	66.46
Democratic (DFL)	Colton Kratky	7,909	33.39
Write-in		35	0.15
Total votes		23,685	100

=== District 30A ===
District 30A is located in the northwestern metro and includes the cities of St. Michael, Otsego, and Albertville, and parts of Hennepin and Wright counties. Incumbent Walter Hudson (R) won re-election.

==== Candidates ====
- Sonja Buckmeier (DFL)
- Walter Hudson (R), incumbent

==== Results ====
District 30A general election
Party	Candidate	Votes	%
Republican	Walter Hudson (incumbent)	16,763	62.74
Democratic (DFL)	Sonja Buckmeier	9,936	37.19
Write-in		18	0.07
Total votes		26,717	100

=== District 30B ===
District 30B is located in east central Minnesota, and includes the cities of Elk River and Otsego, and parts of Anoka, Sherburne, and Wright counties. Incumbent Paul Novotny (R) ran for re-election.

==== Candidates ====
- Paul Bolin (DFL)
- Paul Novotny (R), incumbent

==== Results ====
District 30B general election
Party	Candidate	Votes	%
Republican	Paul Novotny	17,075	65.87
Democratic (DFL)	Paul Bolin	8,825	34.04
Write-in		22	0.08
Total votes		25,922	100

=== District 31A ===
District 31A is in the north metro and includes the cities of Ramsey and Andover in Anoka County, Minnesota. Incumbent Harry Niska (R) ran for re-election.

==== Candidates ====
- Dara Grimmer (DFL)
- Harry Niska (R), incumbent

==== Results ====
District 31A general election
Party	Candidate	Votes	%
Republican	Harry Niska (incumbent)	15,461	61.11
Democratic (DFL)	Dara Grimmer	9,802	38.74
Write-in		39	0.15
Total votes		25,302	100

=== District 31B ===
District 31B is in the northern Twin Cities metropolitan area, which includes the cities of Andover and East Bethel and parts of Anoka and Isanti counties. Incumbent Peggy Scott (R) ran for re-election.

==== Candidates ====
- Gadisa Berkessa (DFL)
- Peggy Scott (R), incumbent

==== Results ====
District 31B general election
Party	Candidate	Votes	%
Republican	Peggy Scott (incumbent)	18,727	70.49
Democratic (DFL)	Gadisa Berkessa	7,799	29.36
Write-in		40	0.15
Total votes		26,566	100

=== District 32A ===
District 32A, in the northern metro, includes the city of Blaine and parts of Anoka County. Incumbent Nolan West (R) was re-elected.

==== Candidates ====
- Ashton Ramsammy (DFL)
- Nolan West (R), incumbent

==== Results ====
District 32A general election
Party	Candidate	Votes	%
Republican	Nolan West (incumbent)	14,816	58.15
Democratic (DFL)	Ashton Ramsammy	10,620	41.68
Write-in		45	0.18
Total votes		25,481	100

=== District 32B ===
District 32B includes the cities of Blaine and Lexington. Freshman representative Matt Norris (DFL) ran for reelection. Norris won his 2022 race by 413 votes.

Norris’ Republican challenger Alex Moe ran for the state senate in 2022 in Duluth. Moe worked in the Anoka County courts system.

==== Candidates ====
- Alex Moe (R), law student
- Matt Norris (DFL), incumbent

==== Results ====
District 32B general election
Party	Candidate	Votes	%
Republican	Alex Moe	11,620	49.04
Democratic (DFL)	Matt Norris (incumbent)	12,030	50.77
Write-in		44	0.19
Total votes		23,694	100

=== District 33A ===
District 33A is in the northeast metro, located in Washington County.

==== Candidates ====
- Patti Anderson (R), incumbent
- Jake Ross (DFL)

==== Results ====
District 33A general election
Party	Candidate	Votes	%
Republican	Patti Anderson (incumbent)	15,262	58.01
Democratic (DFL)	Jake Ross	11,020	41.89
Write-in		25	0.10
Total votes		26,307	100.00

=== District 33B ===
District 33B is in the easternmost part of the Twin Cities metro along the border with Wisconsin. It contains Stillwater, Bayport, Scandia, and Oak Park Heights.

==== Candidates ====
- Josiah Hill (DFL), incumbent
- Jessica L. Johnson (R)

==== Results ====
District 33B general election
Party	Candidate	Votes	%
Republican	Jessica L. Johnson	12,913	48.6
Democratic (DFL)	Josiah Hill (incumbent)	13,631	51.3
Write-in		28	0.11
Total votes		26,572	100.00

=== District 34A ===
District 34A includes Rogers, Dayton and Champlin. Incumbent Danny Nadeau won in 2022 by a significant margin and secured re-election in 2024. Nadeau is a contract manager with Hennepin County.

Nadeau expanded his lead against DFL challenger, Brian Raines, who had lost to Nadeau by about seven percentage points in 2022. Raines works for the state's carpenters union.

==== Candidates ====
- Danny Nadeau (R), incumbent
- Brian Raines (DFL)

==== Results ====
District 34A general election
Party	Candidate	Votes	%
Republican	Danny Nadeau (incumbent)	15,261	53.48
Democratic (DFL)	Brian Raines	13,240	46.40
Write-in		33	0.12
Total votes		28,534	100.00

=== District 34B ===
District 34B is in the north metro, mostly in Brooklyn Park, with pieces of Coon Rapids and Champlin. Incumbent Melissa Hortman (DFL) was first elected in 2010 and had served as speaker of the Minnesota House since 2019.

==== Candidates ====
- Melissa Hortman (DFL), incumbent
- Scott Simmons (R)

==== Results ====
District 34B general election
Party	Candidate	Votes	%
Republican	Scott Simmons	7,950	36.74
Democratic (DFL)	Melissa Hortman (incumbent)	13,649	63.08
Write-in		40	0.18
Total votes		21,639	100.00

=== District 35A ===
District 35A includes Anoka and Coon Rapids. Incumbent Zack Stephenson (DFL) won re-election by 3.8 percentage points, a narrower margin than his 2022 victory by about five percentage points. Stephenson, who chairs the House Commerce Finance and Policy Committee, is a prosecutor for Hennepin County.

Josh Jungling was the Republican challenger. He was the charitable gambling manager for the Anoka Ramsey Athletic Association.

==== Candidates ====
- Josh Jungling (R)
- Zack Stephenson (DFL), incumbent

==== Results ====
District 35A general election
Party	Candidate	Votes	%
Republican	Josh Jungling	10,950	48.01
Democratic (DFL)	Zack Stephenson (incumbent)	11,822	51.83
Write-in		37	0.16
Total votes		22,809	100.00

=== District 35B ===
District 35B is in the northwest metro and includes Coon Rapids and Andover. Incumbent Jerry Newton (DFL) was retiring.

DFL candidate Kari Rehrauer, a member of the Coon Rapids City Council and a teacher, narrowly defeated Republican Steve Pape, a Navy veteran and CEO of an engineering consulting firm.

==== Candidates ====
- Steve Pape (R)
- Kari Rehrauer (DFL), Coon Rapids city councilor

==== Results ====
District 35B general election
Party	Candidate	Votes	%
Republican	Steve Pape	11,280	49.29
Democratic (DFL)	Kari Rehrauer	11,560	50.51
Write-in		47	0.21
Total votes		22,887	100.00

=== District 36A ===
District 36A is in the north metro and includes North Oaks, Lino Lakes and Circle Pines. Incumbent Elliott Engen (R), who won reelection, previously worked for a nonprofit environmental organization, and was one of the state's youngest legislators.

Engen defeated DFL challenger Janelle Calhoun, previously an executive director for a cancer research nonprofit.

==== Candidates ====
- Janelle Calhoun (DFL)
- Elliott Engen (R), incumbent

===== Did not file =====
- Heidi Heino (Independence-Alliance)

==== Results ====
District 36A general election
Party	Candidate	Votes	%
Republican	Elliott Engen	14,998	54.06
Democratic (DFL)	Janelle Calhoun	12,714	45.83
Write-in		29	0.10
Total votes		27,741	100.00

=== District 36B ===
District 36B is located in the northeast metro and contains White Bear Lake. Incumbent Brion Curran was first elected in 2022 with 53.48% of the vote.

==== Candidates ====
- Patty Bradway (R)
- Brion Curran (DFL), incumbent

===== Eliminated in primary =====
- T.J. Malaskee (DFL)

==== Results ====
District 36B DFL primary
Party	Candidate	Votes	%
Democratic (DFL)	Brion Curran (incumbent)	1,852	62.59
Democratic (DFL)	T.J. Malaskee	1,107	37.41
Total votes		2,959	100

District 36B general election
Party	Candidate	Votes	%
Republican	Patty Bradway	12,152	48.29
Democratic (DFL)	Brion Curran (incumbent)	12,977	51.57
Write-in		37	0.15
Total votes		25,166	100.00

=== District 37A ===
District 37A is located in the northwestern part of Hennepin County. Incumbent Kristin Robbins (R) was first elected in 2018 and took 56.11% of the vote in 2022.

==== Candidates ====
- Kristin Robbins (R), incumbent
- Laurie Wolfe (DFL)

==== Results ====
District 37A general election
Party	Candidate	Votes	%
Republican	Kristin Robbins (incumbent)	15,817	57.12
Democratic (DFL)	Laurie Wolfe	11,851	42.8
Write-in		22	0.08
Total votes		27,690	100.00

=== District 37B ===
District 37B is located in Maple Grove in the northwest metro. Incumbent Kristin Bahner (DFL) won with 55.61% of the vote in 2022.

==== Candidates ====
- Kristin Bahner (DFL), incumbent
- John R. Bristol (R)

==== Results ====
District 37B general election
Party	Candidate	Votes	%
Republican	John R. Bristol	11,841	44.54
Democratic (DFL)	Kristin Bahner (incumbent)	14,726	55.39
Write-in		18	0.07
Total votes		26,585	100.00

=== District 38A ===
District 38A is located in the northeast metro area and includes the cities of Brooklyn Park and Osseo. Huldah Hiltsley (DFL) defeated Brad Olson (R) in the general election.

The district is characterized by a diverse demographic breakdown: 38% White, 33% Black, 18% Asian, and 9% Hispanic. 27% of the population is foreign-born, predominantly from Africa. Kenyan American Huldah Hiltsley defeated Liberian American Wynfred Russell in the DFL primary to succeed the retiring incumbent Michael Nelson (DFL).

Hiltsley ran in the DFL primary for Senate District 38 in 2022, but lost to Susan Pha.

==== Candidates ====
- Huldah Hiltsley (DFL)
- Brad Olson (R)

===== Eliminated in primary =====
- Yelena S. Kurdyumova (R)
- Wynfred Russell (DFL)

==== Results ====
DFL primary results by precinct: Hiltsley: 50–60%; 60–70%; 70–80%; Russell: 50–60%; 60–70%

District 38A DFL primary
Party	Candidate	Votes	%
Democratic (DFL)	Huldah Hiltsley	1,005	51.3
Democratic (DFL)	Wynfred Russell	955	48.7
Total votes		1,960	100.0

District 38A Republican primary
Party	Candidate	Votes	%
Republican	Brad Olson	566	89.8
Republican	Yelena S. Kurdyumova	64	10.2
Total votes		630	100.0

District 38A general election
Party	Candidate	Votes	%
Republican	Brad Olson	5,410	34.94
Democratic (DFL)	Huldah Hiltsley	10,030	64.78
Write-in		42	0.27
Total votes		15,482	100.00

=== District 38B ===
District 38B in the north metro represents all of Brooklyn Center and parts of Brooklyn Park. Incumbent Samantha Vang was first elected in 2018.

==== Candidates ====
- Robert Marvin (R)
- Samantha Vang (DFL), incumbent

===== Eliminated in primary =====
- Chris Chubb (R)

==== Results ====
District 38B Republican primary
Party	Candidate	Votes	%
Republican	Robert Marvin	267	73.2
Republican	Chris Chubb	98	26.8
Total votes		365	100.0

District 38B general election
Party	Candidate	Votes	%
Republican	Robert Marvin	3,793	25.42
Democratic (DFL)	Samantha Vang (incumbent)	11,078	74.25
Write-in		48	0.32
Total votes		14,919	100.00

=== District 39A ===
District 39A is located in Anoka County in the north metro, mostly in the city of Fridley. Incumbent Erin Koegel (DFL) had served since 2017.

==== Candidates ====
- Erin Koegel (DFL), incumbent
- Rod Sylvester (R)

==== Results ====
District 39A general election
Party	Candidate	Votes	%
Republican	Rod Sylvester	6,749	36.37
Democratic (DFL)	Erin Koegel (incumbent)	11,751	63.33
Write-in		55	0.30
Total votes		18,555	100.00

=== District 39B ===
District 39B is directly northeast of Minneapolis and includes all of Saint Anthony and parts of Columbia Heights and New Brighton. Incumbent Sandra Feist has been in office since 2021.

==== Candidates ====
- Sandra Feist (DFL), incumbent
- Kt Jacobs (R)

==== Results ====
District 39B general election
Party	Candidate	Votes	%
Republican	Kt Jacobs	5,875	28.88
Democratic (DFL)	Sandra Feist (incumbent)	14,427	70.91
Write-in		44	0.22
Total votes		20,346	100.00

=== District 40A ===
District 40A is in the north metro, containing Arden Hills, Blaine, Mounds View, and parts of New Brighton and Shoreview. Incumbent Kelly Moller (DFL) had served since 2019. Moller ran unopposed.

==== Candidates ====
- Kelly Moller (DFL), incumbent

==== Results ====
District 40A general election
Party	Candidate	Votes	%
Democratic (DFL)	Kelly Moller (incumbent)	16,869	95.87
Write-in		727	4.13
Total votes		17,596	100.00

=== District 40B ===
Incumbent DFLer Jamie Becker-Finn declined to seek re-election. Fellow DFLer Curtis Johnson filed to run to succeed her, he was uncontested in the primary after another candidate, David Gottfried withdrew. Johnson defeated Republican Paul Wikstrom by a 29-point margin.

After the election Wikstrom alleged that Johnson did not meet state residency requirements, claiming that he primarily lived outside the district, in Little Canada, and rented a local apartment solely to run for office. The district court judge in charge of the case ruled in favor of Wikstrom and invalidated Johnson's election certificate, leaving the seat vacant at the start of the session. A special election was held on March 11, 2025. Gottfried, a DFL candidate who withdrew prior to the November election, defeated Republican Paul Wikstrom in the special election.

District 40B general election
Party	Candidate	Votes	%
Democratic (DFL)	Curtis Johnson (Note: Johnson's victory was overturned when a judge ruled that he does not meet the requirement of residence in the district.)	15,963	65.19
Republican	Paul Wikstrom	8,460	34.55
Write-in		63	0.26
Total votes		24,486	100.00

=== District 41A ===
District 41A includes Afton, Lake Elmo and Cottage Grove. Incumbent Mark Wiens (R) did not seek reelection. In 2022, Wiens narrowly carried the district, while Tim Walz won by nearly five percentage points. Republican Wayne Johnson won the seat by a margin just over 1%.

Lucia Wroblewski, a retired St. Paul police officer, was the DFL candidate. On her campaign site, Wroblewski said she was a use-of-force expert for 24 years and a field training officer for 22 years. She was also an Afton City Council member.

The Republican Party endorsed Grayson McNew, a school voucher advocate backed by the Action 4 Liberty PAC, for the Republican primary. McNew lost the primary election to the more moderate Republican candidate Wayne Johnson.

==== Candidates ====
- Wayne Johnson (R), former Washington County commissioner
- Lucia Wroblewski (DFL), former St. Paul police officer

===== Eliminated in primary =====
- Grayson McNew (R)

==== Results ====
GOP primary results by precinct: Johnson: 50–60%; 60–70%; McNew: 50–60%; 60–70%; 70–80%

District 41A Republican primary
Party	Candidate	Votes	%
Republican	Wayne Johnson	1,101	53.5
Republican	Grayson McNew	956	46.5
Total votes		2,057	100.0

District 41A general election
Party	Candidate	Votes	%
Republican	Wayne Johnson	15,167	50.49
Democratic (DFL)	Lucia Wroblewski	14,840	49.40
Write-in		32	0.11
Total votes		30,039	100.00
Republican hold			

=== District 41B ===
District 41B includes Cottage Grove and Hastings. Incumbent Shane Hudella (R) retired. Hudella won in 2022 by 418 votes.

The Republican candidate, Tom Dippel, a previous state senate candidate, won the seat against Jen Fox, a Hastings City Council member and acting mayor of the city. Dippel is another Action 4 Liberty-endorsed candidate and founded the Minnesota Dental Lab in Newport.

==== Candidates ====
- Tom Dippel (R)
- Jen Fox (DFL), Hastings city councilor

==== Results ====
District 41B general election
Party	Candidate	Votes	%
Republican	Tom Dippel	12,529	50.94
Democratic (DFL)	Jen Fox	12,019	48.86
Write-in		50	0.20
Total votes		24,598	100.00

=== District 42A ===
District 42A is in the northwest metro area, composed of parts of Plymouth and Maple Grove. Incumbent Ned Carroll (DFL) was first elected in 2022 with 58% of the vote.

==== Candidates ====
- Kathy Burkett (R)
- Ned Carroll (DFL), incumbent

==== Results ====
District 42A general election
Party	Candidate	Votes	%
Republican	Kathy Burkett	10,617	42.58
Democratic (DFL)	Ned Carroll (incumbent)	14,288	57.3
Write-in		31	0.12
Total votes		24,936	100.00

=== District 42B ===
District 42B is located in Plymouth. Incumbent Ginny Klevorn (DFL) was first elected in 2018.

==== Candidates ====
- Ginny Klevorn (DFL), incumbent
- Perry Nouis (R)

==== Results ====
District 42B general election
Party	Candidate	Votes	%
Republican	Perry Nouis	8,757	35.96
Democratic (DFL)	Ginny Klevorn (incumbent)	15,561	63.91
Write-in		31	0.13
Total votes		24,349	100.00

=== District 43A ===
District 43A is in the northwest metro, including New Hope and most of Crystal.

==== Candidates ====
- Cedrick B. Frazier (DFL), incumbent
- Todd Hesemann (R)

==== Results ====
District 43A general election
Party	Candidate	Votes	%
Republican	Todd Hesemann	6,999	33.53
Democratic (DFL)	Cedrick B. Frazier	13,845	66.33
Write-in		29	0.14
Total votes		20,873	100.00

=== District 43B ===
District 43B is in the northwest suburbs of Minneapolis, including Golden Valley, Robbinsdale, and parts of Crystal and Plymouth.

==== Candidates ====
- Mike Freiberg (DFL), incumbent
- Steve Merriman (R)

==== Results ====
District 43B general election
Party	Candidate	Votes	%
Republican	Steve Merriman	6,232	24.63
Democratic (DFL)	Mike Freiberg (incumbent)	19,023	75.19
Write-in		45	0.18
Total votes		25,300	100.00

=== District 44A ===
District 44A is in Ramsey County, north of St. Paul. It includes Little Canada and the northernmost parts of Maplewood.

==== Candidates ====
- Peter M Fischer (DFL), incumbent
- Karla J. Nelson (R)

==== Results ====
District 44A general election
Party	Candidate	Votes	%
Republican	Karla J. Nelson	7,255	37.45
Democratic (DFL)	Peter M Fischer (incumbent)	12,085	62.37
Write-in		35	0.18
Total votes		19,375	100.00

=== District 44B ===
District 44B is in the eastern metro, including the suburbs of Oakdale and North St. Paul.

==== Candidates ====
- Bill Dahn (R)
- TJ Hawthorne (Libertarian)
- Leon M. Lillie (DFL), incumbent

==== Results ====
District 44B general election
Party	Candidate	Votes	%
Republican	Bill Dahn	8,254	37.6
Democratic (DFL)	Leon M. Lillie (incumbent)	12,369	56.35
Libertarian	TJ Hawthorne	1,298	5.91
Write-in		29	0.13
Total votes		21,950	100.00

=== District 45A ===
District 45A is located in the west metro and includes Minnetonka, Excelsior and Orono. Incumbent Andrew Myers (R), an attorney and small business owner, won re-election against Tracey Breazeale (DFL), a Minnetonka Beach City Council member and former business executive.

==== Candidates ====
- Tracey Breazeale (DFL)
- Andrew Myers (R), incumbent

==== Results ====
District 45A general election
Party	Candidate	Votes	%
Republican	Andrew Myers (incumbent)	15,897	55.02
Democratic (DFL)	Tracey Breazeale	12,972	44.89
Write-in		26	0.09
Total votes		28,895	100.00

=== District 45B ===
District 45B is in western Hennepin County and contains parts of Minnetonka. Incumbent Patty Acomb, first elected in 2018, ran unopposed.

==== Candidates ====
- Patty Acomb (DFL), incumbent

==== Results ====
District 45B general election
Party	Candidate	Votes	%
Democratic (DFL)	Patty Acomb (incumbent)	19,625	95.18
Write-in		994	4.82
Total votes		20,619	100.00

=== District 46A ===
District 46A is fully located within Saint Louis Park, just west of Minneapolis. Incumbent Larry Kraft (DFL) was first elected in 2022, when he ran unopposed.

==== Candidates ====
- Larry Kraft (DFL), incumbent
- John Nagel (R)

==== Results ====
District 46A general election
Party	Candidate	Votes	%
Republican	John Nagel	6,168	24.84
Democratic (DFL)	Larry Kraft	18,627	75.02
Write-in		34	0.14
Total votes		24,829	100.00

=== District 46B ===
District 46B is in the south metro, containing all of Hopkins and parts of Saint Louis Park and Edina. Incumbent Cheryl Youakim (DFL) had served since 2015 and ran unopposed in 2022.

==== Candidates ====
- Kim Rich (R)
- Cheryl Youakim (DFL), incumbent

==== Results ====
District 46B general election
Party	Candidate	Votes	%
Republican	Kim Rich	7,863	32.21
Democratic (DFL)	Cheryl Youakim (incumbent)	16,510	67.62
Write-in		42	0.17
Total votes		24,415	100.00

=== District 47A ===
District 47A in the east metro contains parts of Woodbury and Maplewood. Incumbent Amanda Hemmingsen-Jaeger was first elected in 2022 with 60.18% of the vote.

==== Candidates ====
- Amanda Hemmingsen-Jaeger (DFL), incumbent
- Teresa Whitson (R)

==== Results ====
District 47A general election
Party	Candidate	Votes	%
Republican	Teresa Whitson	9,143	39.29
Democratic (DFL)	Amanda Hemmingsen-Jaeger (incumbent)	14,106	60.62
Write-in		21	0.09
Total votes		23,270	100.00

=== District 47B ===
District 47B includes most of southern and eastern Woodbury. Incumbent Ethan Cha (DFL) won re-election.

==== Candidates ====
- Ethan Cha (DFL), incumbent
- Dwight Dorau (R)

==== Results ====
District 47B general election
Party	Candidate	Votes	%
Republican	Dwight Dorau	11,867	45.46
Democratic (DFL)	Ethan Cha (incumbent)	14,202	54.41
Write-in		35	0.13
Total votes		26,104	100.00

=== District 48A ===
District 48A is located in Carver County in the southwest metro. Incumbent Jim Nash (R) was first elected in 2014; he defeated Nathan Kells (DFL) with 59.66% of the vote in 2022.

==== Candidates ====
- Nathan Kells (DFL)
- Jim Nash (R), incumbent

==== Results ====
District 48A general election
Party	Candidate	Votes	%
Republican	Jim Nash (incumbent)	16,818	60.41
Democratic (DFL)	Nathan Kells	11,000	39.51
Write-in		23	0.08
Total votes		27,841	100.00

=== District 48B ===
District 48B includes Chaska, Chanhassen and Shorewood. Incumbent Lucy Rehm (DFL) won reelection in a close race. Rehm is a former teacher and Chanhassen City Council member. In 2022, she won the election by 417 votes; in 2024, she won by 225. Caleb Steffenhagen, an officer in the Minnesota Army National Guard and a teacher, was the GOP candidate.

==== Candidates ====
- Lucille "Lucy" Rehm (DFL), incumbent
- Caleb Steffenhagen (R), business owner

===== Withdrawn =====
- Haley Schubert (R), Chanhassen city councilor

==== Results ====
District 48B general election
Party	Candidate	Votes	%
Democratic (DFL)	Lucille "Lucy" Rehm (incumbent)	12,953	50.39
Republican	Caleb Steffenhagen	12,728	49.52
Write-in		22	0.09
Total votes		25,703	100.00
Democratic (DFL) hold			

=== District 49A ===
District 49A is located in the southwest metro and includes portions of Minnetonka and Eden Prairie. Incumbent Laurie Pryor (DFL) was retiring. Alex Falconer, campaign manager for the Campaign to Save the Boundary Waters, defeated Minnetonka City Council member Kissy Coakley in the DFL primary and then defeated Stacy L. Bettison in the general election.

==== Candidates ====
- Stacy L. Bettison (R)
- Alex Falconer (DFL)

===== Eliminated in primary =====
- Kissy C Coakley (DFL)

==== Results ====
District 49A DFL primary
Party	Candidate	Votes	%
Democratic (DFL)	Alex Falconer	2,377	74.9
Democratic (DFL)	Kissy C Coakley	798	25.1
Total votes		3,175	100.0

District 49A general election
Party	Candidate	Votes	%
Democratic (DFL)	Alex Falconer	16,104	60.81
Republican	Stacy L. Bettison	10,342	39.05
Write-in		37	0.14
Total votes		26,483	100.00
Democratic (DFL) hold			

=== District 49B ===
District 49B is located in Eden Prairie. Incumbent Carlie Kotzya-Witthun (DFL) had served since 2019 and was re-elected with 57% of the vote.

==== Candidates ====
- Carlie Kotyza-Witthuhn (DFL), incumbent
- Wendi Russo (R)

==== Results ====
District 49B general election
Party	Candidate	Votes	%
Democratic (DFL)	Carlie Kotyza-Witthuhn (incumbent)	13,529	57.11
Republican	Wendi Russo	10,138	42.8
Write-in		21	0.09
Total votes		23,688	100.00
Democratic (DFL) hold			

=== District 50A ===
District 50A is located in Edina and parts of Bloomington. Incumbent Heather Edelson (DFL) did not seek re-election as she was elected to the Hennepin County Board of Commissioners in a 2024 special election. Democrat Julie Greene was elected with 64.57% of the vote.

==== Candidates ====
- Julie Greene (DFL)
- Owen Michaelson (R)

==== Results ====
District 50A general election
Party	Candidate	Votes	%
Democratic (DFL)	Julie Greene	16,766	64.57
Republican	Owen Michaelson	9,161	35.28
Write-in		40	0.15
Total votes		25,967	100.00
Democratic (DFL) hold			

=== District 50B ===
District 50B is in Bloomington. Incumbent Steve Elkins (DFL) had served since 2019 and was re-elected with 63% of the vote.

==== Candidates ====
- Steve Elkins (DFL), incumbent
- Bob Gust (R)

==== Results ====
District 50B general election
Party	Candidate	Votes	%
Democratic (DFL)	Steve Elkins (incumbent)	16,524	63.18
Republican	Bob Gust	9,596	36.69
Write-in		33	0.13
Total votes		26,153	100.00
Democratic (DFL) hold			

=== District 51A ===
District 51A is located in Richfield and the southeasternmost part of Minneapolis. Incumbent Michael Howard (DFL), a member since 2019, won re-election with 73.4% of the vote.

==== Candidates ====
- Michael Howard (DFL), incumbent
- Jeffrey Thompson (R)

===== Withdrawn =====
- Loretta Arradondo (DFL)

===== Endorsements =====
Michael Howard

Organizations

- Minnesota Democratic–Farmer–Labor Party
Loretta Arradondo (withdrawn)

Organizations

- Women Winning

==== Results ====
District 51A general election
Party	Candidate	Votes	%
Democratic (DFL)	Michael Howard (incumbent)	15,440	73.44
Republican	Jeffrey Thompson	5,533	26.32
Write-in		51	0.24
Total votes		21,024	100.00
Democratic (DFL) hold			

=== District 51B ===
District 51B is located in Bloomington. Incumbent Nathan Coulter (DFL) won a second term.

==== Candidates ====
- Nathan Coulter (DFL), incumbent
- Lion Dale Johnson (R)

==== Results ====
District 51B general election
Party	Candidate	Votes	%
Democratic (DFL)	Nathan Coulter (incumbent)	13,244	64.08
Republican	Lion Dale Johnson	7,373	35.67
Write-in		51	0.25
Total votes		20,668	100.00
Democratic (DFL) hold			

=== District 52A ===
District 52A covers parts of Eagan and Burnsville in Dakota County. Incumbent Liz Reyer was first elected in 2020, and won re-election by over 20 points.

==== Candidates ====
- Diane Anderson (R)
- Liz Reyer (DFL), incumbent

==== Results ====
District 52A general election
Party	Candidate	Votes	%
Democratic (DFL)	Liz Reyer (incumbent)	13,784	60.88
Republican	Diane Anderson	8,833	39.01
Write-in		26	0.11
Total votes		22,643	100.00
Democratic (DFL) hold			

=== District 52B ===
District 52B is located in northern Dakota County, including parts of Eagan and Mendota Heights. Incumbent Bianca Virnig (DFL) was first elected by special election in December 2023 and was re-elected with 60.6% of the vote.

==== Candidates ====
- Bianca Virnig (DFL), incumbent
- Douglas Willetts (R)

==== Results ====
District 52B general election
Party	Candidate	Votes	%
Democratic (DFL)	Bianca Virnig (incumbent)	15,857	60.57
Republican	Douglas Willetts	10,291	39.31
Write-in		31	0.12
Total votes		26,179	100.00
Democratic (DFL) hold			

=== District 53A ===
District 53A is located in Dakota County in the south metro, including much of Inver Grove Heights. Incumbent Mary Frances Clardy (DFL) was re-elected by a 15-point margin.

==== Candidates ====
- Mary Frances Clardy (DFL), incumbent
- Nathan Herschbach (R)

==== Results ====
District 53A general election
Party	Candidate	Votes	%
Democratic (DFL)	Mary Frances Clardy (incumbent)	14,011	57.73
Republican	Nathan Herschbach	10,226	42.14
Write-in		33	0.15
Total votes		24,268	100.00
Democratic (DFL) hold			

=== District 53B ===
District 53B is located in the southeast metro, including parts of Dakota and Washington counties. Incumbent Rick Hansen (DFL) was first elected in 2004 and won re-election by 19 points.

==== Candidates ====
- Aaron M. Brooksby (R)
- Rick Hansen (DFL), incumbent

==== Results ====
District 53B general election
Party	Candidate	Votes	%
Democratic (DFL)	Rick Hansen (incumbent)	13,203	59.37
Republican	Aaron M. Brooksby	9,002	40.48
Write-in		33	0.15
Total votes		22,238	100.00
Democratic (DFL) hold			

=== District 54A ===
Incumbent DFLer Brad Tabke ran for re-election. He defeated Republican police officer Aaron Paul by a close 0.06% margin. While Tabke had returned to office in 2022 by an 8-point margin, defeating representative Erik Mortensen, Republicans had hoped that running a more moderate Republican like Paul would give them a better chance of winning the seat.

Initial results showed Tabke with a 14-vote lead, with a 0.06% margin. Following the election, it was discovered that the voting machines had a ballot screening malfunction, necessitating thousands of ballots be re-scanned, this was followed by a full automatic recount as perscribed by law. The recount extended Tabke's lead by one vote. Additionally, 21 absentee ballots had gone missing on election day, which prompted legal challenges from Republicans. The Scott County Attorney's investigation showed that those ballots were likely in-person early votes, thrown out in error on the first day of absentee ballot counting. In response to the discrepancy, Paul called for a new election to be held entirely, while requesting that the courts find that Scott County election officials had violated the law. Eventually, twelve absentee ballots were matched to the voters who had cast them and at the trial in December, six voters testified that they had voted for Tabke, while six testified they had voted for Paul. On the first day of session, the judge ruled in favor of Tabke, denying Paul's request for a special election.

District 54A general election
Party	Candidate	Votes	%
Democratic (DFL)	Brad Tabke (incumbent)	10,979	49.95
Republican	Aaron Paul	10,965	49.89
Write-in		36	0.16
Total votes		21,980	100.00
Democratic (DFL) hold			

District 54A general election recount
Party	Candidate	Votes	%
Democratic (DFL)	Brad Tabke (incumbent)	10,980	47.78
Republican	Aaron Paul	10,965	47.72
	All other ballots	1,035	4.50
Total votes		22,980	100.0
Democratic (DFL) hold			
A recount confirmed Tabke's victory, extending his lead from 14 to 15 votes.

=== District 54B ===
District 54B is located in Scott County in the south Twin Cities metropolitan area. Incumbent Ben Bakeberg (R) ran for re-election.

==== Candidates ====
- Ben Bakeberg (R), incumbent
- Jean Lee (DFL)

==== Results ====
District 54B general election
Party	Candidate	Votes	%
Republican	Ben Bakeberg (incumbent)	15,807	61.94
Democratic (DFL)	Jean Lee	9,696	37.99
Write-in		18	0.07
Total votes		25,521	100.00
Republican hold			

=== District 55A ===
District 55A contains the city of Savage and part of Burnsville, in the south Twin Cities metropolitan area. Incumbent Jessica Hanson (DFL), first elected in 2020, was re-elected by a 7-point margin.

==== Candidates ====
- Jessica Hanson (DFL), incumbent
- Gabriela Kroetch (R)

==== General election ====
District 55A general election
Party	Candidate	Votes	%
Democratic (DFL)	Jessica Hanson (incumbent)	12,114	53.33
Republican	Gabriela Kroetch	10,576	46.56
Write-in		24	0.11
Total votes		22,714	100.00
Democratic (DFL) hold			

=== District 55B ===
District 55B is located Burnsville. Incumbent Kaela Berg (DFL), first elected in 2020, was re-elected with 59.24% of the vote.

==== Candidates ====
- Kaela Berg (DFL), incumbent
- Van Holston (R)

==== Results ====
District 55B general election
Party	Candidate	Votes	%
Democratic (DFL)	Kaela Berg (incumbent)	11,616	59.24
Republican	Van Holston	7,968	40.64
Write-in		24	0.12
Total votes		19,608	100.00
Democratic (DFL) hold			

=== District 56A ===
District 56A is located in Apple Valley. Incumbent Robert Bierman won re-election by over 22 percentage points.

==== Candidates ====
- Robert Bierman (DFL), incumbent
- Angela Zorn (R)

==== Results ====
District 56A general election
Party	Candidate	Votes	%
Democratic (DFL)	Robert Bierman (incumbent)	13,750	61.22
Republican	Angela Zorn	8,687	38.68
Write-in		24	0.11
Total votes		22,461	100.00
Democratic (DFL) hold			

=== District 56B ===
District 56B is located in the north of Dakota County. Incumbent John Huot (DFL) had served since 2019 and won re-election with 55.97% of the vote.

==== Candidates ====
- Angeline Anderson (R)
- John Huot (DFL), incumbent

==== Results ====
District 56B general election
Party	Candidate	Votes	%
Democratic (DFL)	John Huot (incumbent)	14,736	55.97
Republican	Angeline Anderson	11,575	43.96
Write-in		19	0.07
Total votes		26,330	100.00
Democratic (DFL) hold			

=== District 57A ===
District 57A is located in Scott and Dakota counties, including portions of Lakeville. Incumbent Jon Koznick had served since 2015 and won re-election with 62.55% of the vote.

==== Candidates ====
- Veda Kanitz (DFL)
- Jon Koznick (R), incumbent

===== Endorsements =====
Veda Kanitz

Organizations

- DFL Environmental Caucus
- DFL Rural Caucus
- Women Winning

==== Results ====
District 57A general election
Party	Candidate	Votes	%
Republican	Jon Koznick (incumbent)	16,479	62.55
Democratic (DFL)	Veda Kanitz	9,848	37.38
Write-in		18	0.07
Total votes		26,345	100.00
Republican hold			

=== District 57B ===
District 57B covers Lakeville. Incumbent Jeff Witte (R) won the 2022 race by 676 votes, and won re-election by a wider margin.

==== Candidates ====
- Brian Cohn (DFL), party activist
- Jeff Witte (R), incumbent

==== Results ====
District 57B general election
Party	Candidate	Votes	%
Republican	Jeff Witte (incumbent)	13,781	52.35
Democratic (DFL)	Brian Cohn	12,520	47.56
Write-in		24	0.09
Total votes		26,325	100.00
Republican hold			

=== District 58A ===
District 58A is located in Scott, Rice, and Dakota counties, including the city of Northfield. Incumbent Kristi Pursell (DFL) won her first re-election, receiving 52.43% of the vote, a decrease from her 54.48% victory in 2022.

==== Candidates ====
- Rita Hillmann Olson (R)
- Kristi Pursell (DFL), incumbent

==== Results ====
District 58A general election
Party	Candidate	Votes	%
Democratic (DFL)	Kristi Pursell (incumbent)	13,325	52.43
Republican	Rita Hillmann Olson	12,067	47.48
Write-in		22	0.09
Total votes		25,414	100.00
Democratic (DFL) hold			

=== District 58B ===
District 58B is located in the southeastern part of the Twin Cities metro. It includes portions of Dakota County. The district covers the cities of Farmington and portions of Lakeville. Incumbent Pat Garofalo (R) did not seek re-election. Republican Drew Roach won the seat by a 19-point margin.

==== Candidates ====
- Ian English (DFL)
- Drew Roach (R)

==== Results ====
District 58B general election
Party	Candidate	Votes	%
Republican	Drew Roach	14,886	59.84
Democratic (DFL)	Ian English	9,962	40.05
Write-in		29	0.12
Total votes		24,877	100.00
Republican hold			

=== District 59A ===
District 59A covers Camden and parts of Near North in north Minneapolis. Incumbent Fue Lee (DFL) ran unopposed. He was first elected in 2016, and won his second consecutive unopposed race at 97.93%.

==== Candidates ====
- Fue Lee (DFL), incumbent

==== Results ====
District 59A general election
Party	Candidate	Votes	%
Democratic (DFL)	Fue Lee (incumbent)	11,672	97.93
Write-in		247	2.07
Total votes		11,919	100.00
Democratic (DFL) hold			

=== District 59B ===
District 59B is located in Near North, Central, and parts of the East Bank neighborhood in Minneapolis. Incumbent Esther Agbaje was first elected in 2020 and ran unopposed in 2022. She was re-elected with 82.34% of the vote.

==== Candidates ====
- Esther Agbaje (DFL), incumbent
- Kenneth Smoron (R)

==== Results ====
District 59B general election
Party	Candidate	Votes	%
Democratic (DFL)	Esther Agbaje (incumbent)	16,791	82.34
Republican	Kenneth Smoron	3,549	17.4
Write-in		52	0.26
Total votes		20,392	100.0
Democratic (DFL) hold			

=== District 60A ===
District 60A is located in Northeast Minneapolis. Incumbent Sydney Jordan (DFL), who was first elected in a 2020 special election, ran for re-election. Jordan was elected with 84.59% of the vote.

==== Candidates ====
- Mary Holmberg (R)
- Sydney Jordan (DFL), incumbent

==== Results ====
District 60A general election
Party	Candidate	Votes	%
Democratic (DFL)	Sydney Jordan (incumbent)	19,684	84.59
Republican	Mary Holmberg	3,535	15.19
Write-in		51	0.22
Total votes		23,270	100.0
Democratic (DFL) hold			

=== District 60B ===
District 60B is located in Southeast Minneapolis and includes all or parts of the neighborhoods Cedar-Riverside, Prospect Park, Marcy-Holmes, Como, as well as the University of Minnesota campus. The incumbent was DFLer Mohamud Noor, who was first elected in 2018, and won re-election with 82.7% of the vote.

==== Candidates ====
- Mohamud Noor (DFL), incumbent
- Abigail Wolters (R)

==== Results ====
District 60B general election
Party	Candidate	Votes	%
Democratic (DFL)	Mohamud Noor (incumbent)	9,993	82.70
Republican	Abigail Wolters	2,041	16.89
Write-in		50	0.41
Total votes		12,084	100.0
Democratic (DFL) hold			

=== District 61A ===
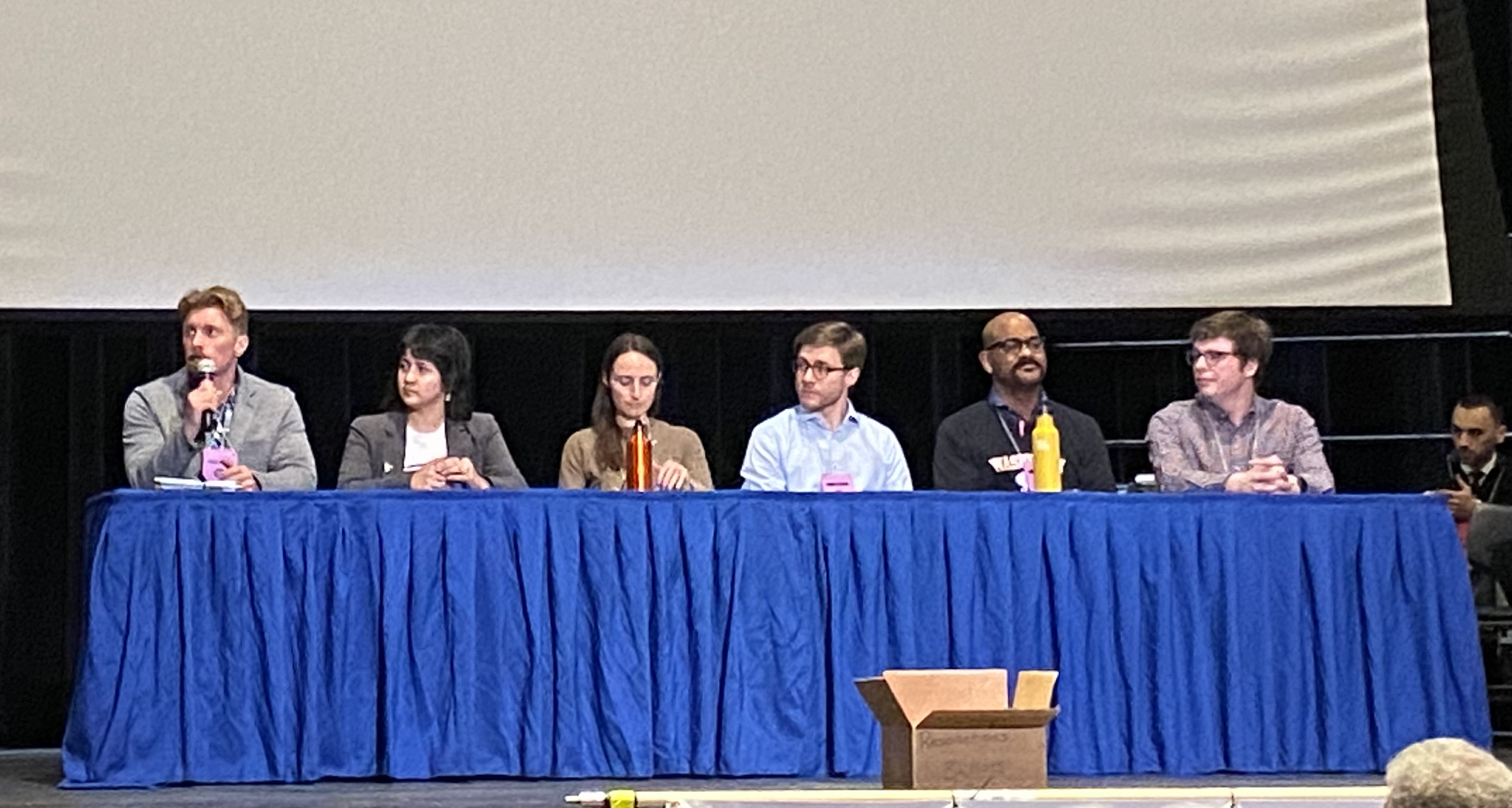
Candidates for endorsement at the SD61 DFL convention, left to right: Trevor Turner, Isabel Rolfes, Katie Jones, Dylan McMahon, Jared Brewington, and Will Stancil

District 61A is located in downtown and Calhoun-Isles in south Minneapolis, including neighborhoods such as Uptown, Loring Park, Bryn Mayr, Lowry Hill, and Cedar-Isles-Dean. Incumbent Frank Hornstein (DFL), first elected in 2002, was retiring.

District 61A was the only contested DFL primary for a House seat in Minneapolis or Saint Paul. The primary drew attention for its online activity: candidate Will Stancil, known for his Twitter presence, attracted the attention of media and of right-wing extremists. Some extremists, posing as Stancil supporters, made threats to other candidates.

Katie Jones, an engineer, first won the DFL primary over attorney Will Stancil and legislative aide Isabel Rolfes, then won the seat over Green Party candidate Toya López with 84% of the vote.

==== Candidates ====
- Katie Jones (DFL)
- Toya López (Green)

===== Eliminated in primary =====
- Isabel Rolfes (DFL)
- Will Stancil (DFL)

===== Withdrawn =====
- Jared Brewington (DFL)
- Dylan McMahon (DFL)
- Trevor Turner (DFL)

===== Endorsements =====
Will Stancil (eliminated)

State legislators

- Tom Berg, former state representative
- Jack Davies, former president of the Minnesota Senate and Court of Appeals judge
- Dee Long, former speaker of the Minnesota House
- Ted Mondale, former state senator
- Myron Orfield, former state senator
- Bob Tennessen, former state senator

Municipal officials

- Lisa Goodman, former Minneapolis City Council member

Organizations

- Carpenters Local 332
- Minneapolis Firefighters Local 82 – International Association of Fire Fighters
- Minnesota Professional Firefighters – International Association of Fire Fighters
- Moms Demand Action
- Path to Progress
Katie Jones

State officials

- Keith Ellison, attorney general of Minnesota

State legislators

- Frank Hornstein, incumbent state representative in 61A
- Larry Kraft, state representative

Organizations

- DFL Environmental Caucus
- DFL Progressive Caucus
Isabel Rolfes (eliminated)

State legislators

- Kaela Berg, state representative
- Athena Hollins, state representative
- Fue Lee, state representative
- Kristi Pursell, state representative
- Liz Reyer, state representative
- Brad Tabke, state representative
- Clare Oumou Verbeten, state senator

Organizations

- Minnesota Young DFL
- Moms Demand Action
- Stonewall DFL
Declined to endorse

Organizations

- Minnesota Democratic–Farmer–Labor Party

==== Results ====
DFL primary results by precinct: Jones: 30–40%; 40–50%; 50–60%; Stancil: 60–70%

District 61A DFL primary
Party	Candidate	Votes	%
Democratic (DFL)	Katie Jones	3,956	43.15
Democratic (DFL)	Will Stancil	3,340	36.43
Democratic (DFL)	Isabel Rolfes	1,872	20.42
Total votes		9,168	100.0

District 61A general election
Party	Candidate	Votes	%
Democratic (DFL)	Katie Jones	18,234	83.92
Green	Toya López	3,284	15.11
Write-in		209	0.96
Total votes		21,727	100.00
Democratic (DFL) hold			

=== District 61B ===
District 61B is located in southwest Minneapolis. Incumbent Jamie Long (DFL), the House majority leader, won re-election with 89.09% of the vote. Long was first elected in 2018 and ran unopposed in 2022.

==== Candidates ====
- Bob "Again" Carney Jr (R)
- Jamie Long (DFL), incumbent

==== Results ====
District 61B general election
Party	Candidate	Votes	%
Democratic (DFL)	Jamie Long (incumbent)	23,864	89.09
Republican	Bob "Again" Carney Jr	2,861	10.68
Write-in		61	0.23
Total votes		26,786	100.0
Democratic (DFL) hold			

=== District 62A ===
District 62A is located in South Minneapolis and includes the neighborhoods of Whittier, Stevens Square-Loring Heights, West Phillips, Lyndale and Kingfield. Incumbent Aisha Gomez (DFL) was first elected in 2018 and won re-election with 90.07% of the vote.

==== Candidates ====
- Aisha Gomez (DFL), incumbent
- Alexandra (ZaZa) Hoffman Novick (R)

===== Endorsements =====
Aisha Gomez

Organizations

- Minnesota Democratic–Farmer–Labor Party

==== Results ====
District 62A general election
Party	Candidate	Votes	%
Democratic (DFL)	Aisha Gomez (incumbent)	13,349	90.07
Republican	Alexandra (ZaZa) Hoffman Novick	1,434	9.68
Write-in		38	0.26
Total votes		14,821	100.0
Democratic (DFL) hold			

=== District 62B ===
District 62B is located in South Minneapolis, comprising much of Phillips and Powderhorn. Incumbent Hodan Hassan (DFL), first elected in 2018, was retiring. In 2022, Hassan was re-elected with 90.28% of the vote.

Anquam Mahamoud (DFL) defeated Republican Bob Sullentrop, winning 87.23% of the vote. Mahamoud was the former COO of Twin Cities Health Services, a mental health and substance use treatment center in the Twin Cities. The center filed for bankruptcy on June 17, 2024, citing over $3 million in debts, including $721,000 to the IRS and over $39,000 to the Minnesota Department of Revenue, and had its license revoked for licensing violations prior to Mahamoud's tenure as COO. Mahamoud served as COO from October 2023 to April 2024.

==== Candidates ====
- Anquam Mahamoud (DFL)
- Bob Sullentrop (R)

===== Withdrawn =====
- Bill Emory (DFL)
- Londel French (DFL), former Minneapolis Park Board commissioner
- Ira Jourdain (DFL), Minneapolis Public Schools board member

==== Endorsements ====
Londel French (withdrawn)

State officials

- Keith Ellison, attorney general of Minnesota

State legislators

- Cedrick Frazier, state representative

Municipal officials

- Aisha Chughtai, Minneapolis city councillor
- Robin Wonsley, Minneapolis city councillor

Organizations

- DFL Progressive Caucus
- Stonewall DFL
Bill Emory (withdrawn)

Municipal officials

- Amy Brendmoen, former Saint Paul city councillor
- Heidi Garrido, Hopkins city councillor
- Jeremy Schroeder, former Minneapolis city councillor
Anquam Mahamoud

U.S. representatives

- Ilhan Omar, MN-05

State legislators

- Mary Frances Clardy, state representative
- Omar Fateh, state senator
- Hodan Hassan, state representative
- Foung Hawj, state senator
- Samakab Hussein, state representative
- Zaynab Mohamed, state senator
- Mohamud Noor, state representative
- María Isa Pérez-Vega, state representative
- Jay Xiong, state representative

Municipal officials

- Jason Chavez, Minneapolis city councillor

Organizations

- Minnesota Democratic–Farmer–Labor Party
- Women Winning
Ira Jorurdain (withdrawn)

Organizations

- DFL Senior Caucus

==== Results ====
District 62B general election
Party	Candidate	Votes	%
Democratic (DFL)	Anquam Mahamoud	14,747	87.23
Republican	Bob Sullentrop	2,093	12.38
Write-in		66	0.39
Total votes		16,906	100.0
Democratic (DFL) hold			

=== District 63A ===
District 63A is located in south Minneapolis, mostly in Greater Longfellow. Incumbent Samantha Sencer-Mura (DFL) won an unopposed race with 98.76% of the vote. Sencer-Mura was first elected in 2022 at 90.16%.

==== Candidates ====
- Samantha Sencer-Mura (DFL), incumbent

==== Endorsements ====
Samantha Sencer-Mura

Organizations

- Twin Cities DSA

==== Results ====
District 63A general election
Party	Candidate	Votes	%
Democratic (DFL)	Samantha Sencer-Mura	20,289	98.76
Write-in		255	1.24
Total votes		20,544	100.00
Democratic (DFL) hold			

=== District 63B ===
District 63B is located in south Minneapolis, mostly in the Nokomis area. Incumbent Emma Greenman (DFL), first elected in 2020, won re-election.

==== Candidates ====
- Emma Greenman (DFL), incumbent
- Diane Napper (R), graphic designer

==== Results ====
District 63B general election
Party	Candidate	Votes	%
Democratic (DFL)	Emma Greenman (incumbent)	22,790	85.27
Republican	Diane Napper	3,878	14.51
Write-in		58	0.22
Total votes		26,726	100.0
Democratic (DFL) hold			

=== District 64A ===
District 64A is located in western Saint Paul, mostly in Union Park and Mac-Groveland. Incumbent Kaohly Vang Her (DFL), first elected in 2018, won re-election with 83.17% of the vote.

==== Candidates ====
- Kaohly Vang Her (DFL), incumbent
- Dan Walsh (R)

==== Results ====
District 64A general election
Party	Candidate	Votes	%
Democratic (DFL)	Kaohly Her (incumbent)	20,441	83.17
Republican	Dan Walsh	4,080	16.60
Write-in		56	0.23
Total votes		24,577	100.0
Democratic (DFL) hold			

=== District 64B ===
District 64B is located in southwestern Saint Paul, mostly in Highland Park. Incumbent Dave Pinto (DFL) was first elected in 2014 and won the 2024 election with 80.1% of the vote.

==== Candidates ====
- Peter Donahue (R)
- Dave Pinto (DFL), incumbent

==== Results ====
District 64B general election
Party	Candidate	Votes	%
Democratic (DFL)	Dave Pinto (incumbent)	20,922	80.10
Republican	Peter Donahue	5,152	19.72
Write-in		47	0.18
Total votes		26,121	100.00
Democratic (DFL) hold			

=== District 65A ===
District 65A is located in Saint Paul, mostly in Frogtown and Summit-University. Incumbent Samakab Hussein (DFL) ran unopposed and won with 97.07% of the vote. Hussein was first elected in 2022, earning 71.21% of the vote.

==== Candidates ====
- Samakab Hussein (DFL), incumbent

==== Results ====
District 65A general election
Party	Candidate	Votes	%
Democratic (DFL)	Samakab Hussein (incumbent)	10,068	97.07
Write-in		304	2.93
Total votes		10,372	100.00
Democratic (DFL) hold			

=== District 65B ===
District 65B stretches from downtown and the West Side of Saint Paul into the suburb of West Saint Paul. Incumbent María Isa Pérez-Vega (DFL), first elected in 2022, was re-elected with 76.51% of the vote.

==== Candidates ====
- Mike Hilborn (R)
- María Isa Pérez-Vega (DFL), incumbent

==== Results ====
District 65B general election
Party	Candidate	Votes	%
Democratic (DFL)	María Isa Pérez-Vega (incumbent)	15,100	76.51
Republican	Mike Hilborn	4,572	23.17
Write-in		63	0.32
Total votes		19,735	100.00
Democratic (DFL) hold			

=== District 66A ===
District 66A includes the cities of Falcon Heights, Lauderdale, Roseville and Saint Paul (neighborhoods of St. Anthony Park, Como, and Hamline-Midway). Incumbent Leigh Finke, the first transgender legislator in Minnesota, was re-elected with 80.99% of the vote.

==== Candidates ====
- Leigh Finke (DFL), incumbent
- Fadil Jama (R)

==== Results ====
District 66A general election
Party	Candidate	Votes	%
Democratic (DFL)	Leigh Finke (incumbent)	18,166	80.99
Republican	Fadil Jama	4,180	18.64
Write-in		84	0.37
Total votes		22,430	100.00
Democratic (DFL) hold			

=== District 66B ===
District 66B is located in north central Saint Paul. Incumbent Athena Hollins (DFL), first elected in 2020, was re-elected with 76.12% of the vote.

==== Candidates ====
- Greg Copeland (R)
- Athena Hollins (DFL), incumbent

==== Endorsements ====
Athena Hollins

State legislators

- Hodan Hassan, state representative

Municipal officials

- Sharon Sayles Belton, former mayor of Minneapolis (1994-2001)
- Mitra Jalali, Saint Paul City Council president
- Nelsie Yang, Saint Paul City Council member

Individuals

- Nekima Levy Armstrong, activist

Organizations

- FairVote
- Minnesota Democratic–Farmer–Labor Party
- Twin Cities DSA

==== Results ====
District 66B general election
Party	Candidate	Votes	%
Democratic (DFL)	Athena Hollins (incumbent)	10,864	76.12
Republican	Greg Copeland	3,370	23.61
Write-in		38	0.27
Total votes		14,272	100.00
Democratic (DFL) hold			

=== District 67A ===
District 67A is in the northeast corner of Saint Paul. Incumbent Liz Lee was re-elected, receiving 73.96% of the vote.

==== Candidates ====
- Scott Hesselgrave (R)
- Liz Lee (DFL), incumbent

==== Results ====
District 67A general election
Party	Candidate	Votes	%
Democratic (DFL)	Liz Lee (incumbent)	9,133	73.96
Republican	Scott Hesselgrave	3,178	25.74
Write-in		37	0.30
Total votes		12,348	100
Democratic (DFL) hold			

=== District 67B ===
District 67B is located in the easternmost part of Saint Paul. Incumbent Jay Xiong (DFL), first elected in 2018, received 75.17% of votes in 2022. Xiong was re-elected with 74.70% of the vote.

==== Candidates ====
- Sharon Anderson (R)
- Jay Xiong (DFL), incumbent

===== Eliminated in primary =====
- AJ Plehal (R)

==== Results ====
District 67B Republican primary
Party	Candidate	Votes	%
Republican	Sharon Anderson	172	52.0
Republican	AJ Plehal	159	48.0
Total votes		331	100.0

District 67B general election
Party	Candidate	Votes	%
Democratic (DFL)	Jay Xiong (incumbent)	10,610	74.70
Republican	Sharon Anderson	3,538	24.91
Write-in		56	0.39
Total votes		14,204	100.00
Democratic (DFL) hold			

== See also ==
- List of Minnesota state legislatures
- 2024 Minnesota Senate District 45 special election
