= 2024 Minnesota Amendment 1 =

Minnesota Amendment 1
- November 5, 2024
- Environment and Natural Resources Trust Fund Renewal

Results
Choice	Votes	%
Yes	2,526,205	82.64%
No	530,504	17.36%

Yes
90–100%
80–90%
70–80%
60–70%
50–60%
No
90–100%
80–90%
70–80%
60–70%
50–60%
Other
Tie
No Votes

2024 Minnesota Amendment 1 was a legislatively referred constitutional amendment. The amendment amended Article IX section 14 of the Minnesota Constitution to allow for an extension of the Minnesota Environmental and Natural Resources Trust Fund (ENRTF) established in 1988. The law directing 40% of state lottery proceeds to environmental projects. The amendment was accepted by 82.64% of voters.

The question asked on the ballot read: "Shall the Minnesota Constitution be amended to protect drinking water sources and the water quality of lakes, rivers, and streams; conserve wildlife habitat and natural areas; improve air quality; and expand access to parks and trails by extending the transfer of proceeds from the state-operated lottery to the environment and natural resources trust fund, and to dedicate the proceeds for these purposes?"

The amendment was authored in the Minnesota House of Representatives by Athena Hollins, Rick Hansen, Patty Acomb, Sydney Jordan, Kristi Pursell, Mike Freiberg, Sandra Feist, Samantha Sencer-Mura, Zack Stephenson, Leon Lillie, Jamie Long, Lucy Rehm, Larry Kraft, Heather Edelson, Peter Fischer, Amanda Hemmingsen-Jaeger, Steve Elkins, Andrew Myers, and in the Minnesota Senate by Foung Hawj. All are members of the Minnesota DFL.

== Results ==
Choice	Votes	%
For	2,526,205	82.64
Against	530,504	17.36
Total	3,056,709	100.00
