= Peter Johnson (Minnesota politician) =

American politician

Pete Johnson

Member of the Minnesota House of Representatives from the 8A district
- Incumbent
- Assumed office January 14, 2025
- Preceded by: Liz Olson

Personal details
- Born: Two Harbors, Minnesota, U.S.
- Party: Democratic–Farmer–Labor
- Spouse: Dehlia Seim
- Children: 2
- Education: Arizona State University (M.A.); St. Cloud State University
- Profession: Firefighter, politician
- Website: Official website Campaign website

Peter Johnson is an American firefighter, union official, and Democratic–Farmer–Labor politician serving since 2025 as a member of the Minnesota House of Representatives. He represents District 8A.

== Early life and career ==
Johnson was born in rural Lake County, Minnesota, just northeast of Two Harbors, Minnesota. He graduated from Two Harbors High School in 1997 and began attending St. Cloud University shortly thereafter. During his studies, he worked nights and weekends in the emergency room at St. Cloud Hospital. He first became a firefighter in 2002, initially working for a fire department in Lakewood, Colorado, and joined the Duluth Fire Department in 2005.

== Political career ==
Johnson first ran for office in 2024 to succeed outgoing representative Liz Olson, who declined to seek reelection that year and vacated the seat on July 5, 2024. Consultant Jordan Johnson also filed to succeed Olson. During the campaign, both emphasized their personal experiences, with Peter emphasizing his experience as a firefighter and Jordan emphasizing the economic and housing insecurity he experienced in childhood. Peter defeated Jordan with 82% of the vote in the primary election. In the general election, he defeated Republican nominee Mark McGrew, a retired law enforcement officer, by 37 points.

Johnson took office on January 14, 2025. One of his first actions as state representative was to participate in the caucus-wide boycott of the 94th Legislature in an attempt to deny Republicans a quorum to do business in the chamber.

== Personal life and family ==
Johnson's mother was a nurse and his father was a veteran of the Vietnam War. Johnson and his wife, Dehlia, reside in Duluth with their two daughters. Johnson coaches girls' lacrosse at his children's school during the spring and summer.

== Electoral history ==
Minnesota House, 8A District Election, 2024
Party	Candidate	Votes	%	±%
Democratic–Farmer–Labor Primary, August 13, 2024
Democratic (DFL)	Peter Johnson	2,947	82.76%	
Democratic (DFL)	Jordan Johnson	614	17.24%	
Plurality		3,561	65.52%	
Total votes		5,378	100.0%	
General Election, November 5, 2024
Democratic (DFL)	Peter Johnson	15,006	68.22%	−2.26pp
Republican	Mark McGrew	6,962	31.65%	+2.27pp
	Write-in	29	0.13%	
Plurality		8,044	36.57%	-4.59pp
Total votes		21,997	100.0%	+33.99%
Democratic (DFL) hold				
