= Anquam Mahamoud =

American politician

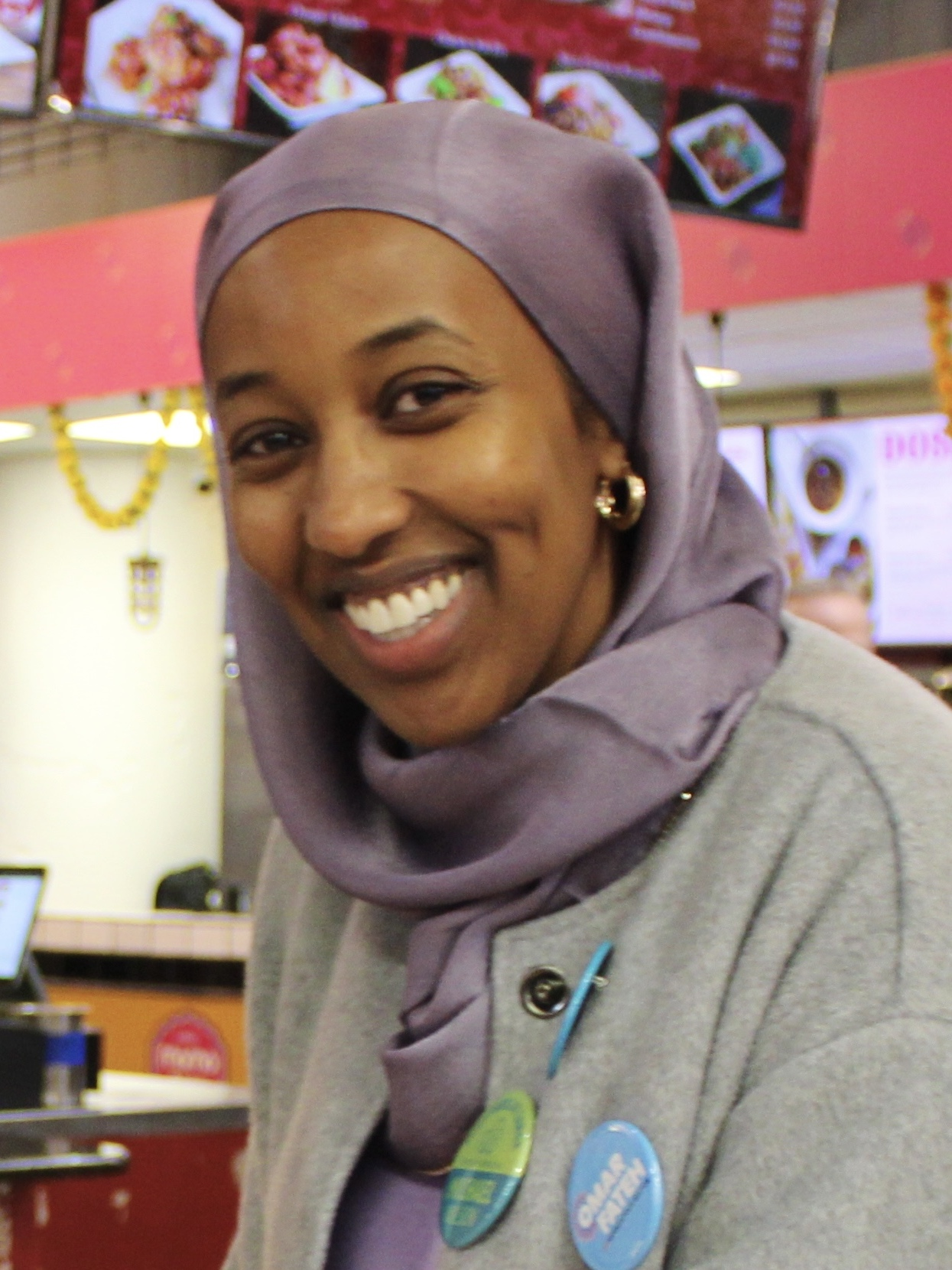

Member of the Minnesota House of Representatives from the 62B district
- Incumbent
- Assumed office January 14, 2025
- Preceded by: Hodan Hassan

Personal details
- Born: 1989 (age 36–37) San Diego, California, U.S.
- Party: Democratic (DFL)
- Education: B.S. in Psychology, St. Catherine University, 2012

Anquam Mahamoud (/ɑnˈɑːm mɑ.xɑˈmud/ ahn-AHM) is an American politician representing District 62B of the Minnesota House of Representatives, which includes Minneapolis's Phillips and Powderhorn neighborhoods. Mahamoud is a member of the Minnesota Democratic-Farmer-Labor Party.

== Early life, education and career ==
Mahamoud was born in San Diego, California, and moved with her family to Minneapolis in 1998. She graduated with a B.S. in psychology from Saint Catherine University in Saint Paul. Before running for office, she worked as a substance treatment and mental health provider, including as COO of Twin Cities Health Services, an organization that had its license revoked for licensing violations before Mahamoud's tenure.

== Minnesota House of Representatives ==
In February 2024, three-term representative Hodan Hassan announced that she would not seek reelection in 2024 for District 62B of the Minnesota House of Representatives. Soon after, Mahamoud announced her candidacy and sought the Democratic-Farmer-Labor party's endorsement. She received it and the other candidates dropped out before the candidacy filing deadline, so no DFL primary election was held. Mahamoud won the 2024 general election for the seat, defeating Republican nominee Bob Sullentrop by nearly 75 percentage points.

== Electoral history ==
District 62B general election
Party	Candidate	Votes	%
Democratic (DFL)	Anquam Mahamoud	14,747	87.23
Republican	Bob Sullentrop	2,093	12.38
Write-in		66	0.39
Total votes		16,906	100.0
Democratic (DFL) hold			
