= Drew Roach =

American politician

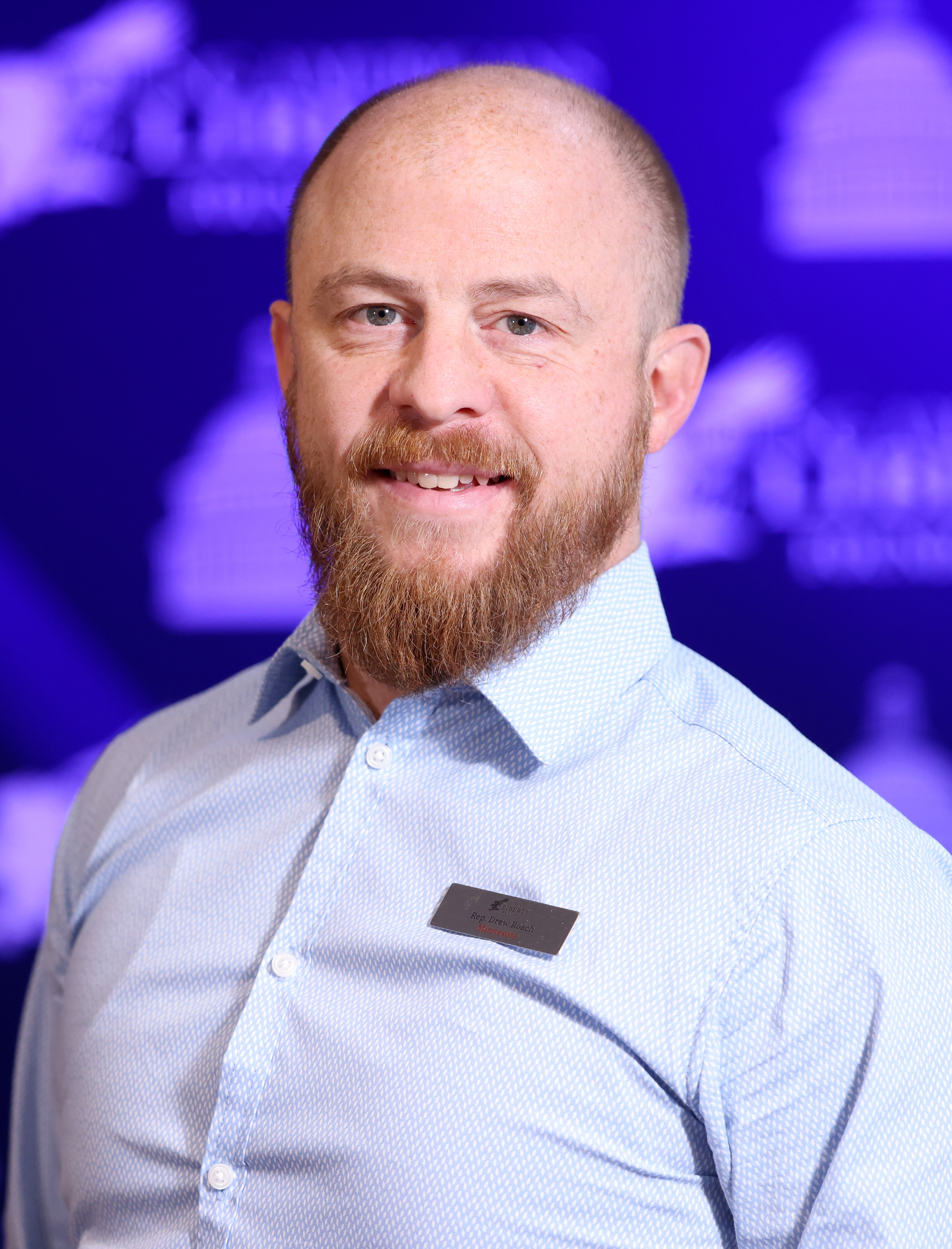
- Roach at the 2024 Hazlitt Summit hosted by Young Americans for Liberty Foundation

Member of the Minnesota House of Representatives from the 58B district
- Incumbent
- Assumed office January 7, 2025
- Preceded by: Pat Garofalo

Personal details
- Born: January 29, 1985 (age 41) Burnsville, Minnesota, U.S.
- Party: Republican

Drew Roach (born January 28, 1985) is an American politician. A member of the Republican Party, he represents district 58B in the Minnesota House of Representatives. His district is in east central Minnesota, mostly within Dakota County, and includes Farmington, Hampton, and Dennison.

== Life and career ==
Roach attended Minnesota School of Business, but did not graduate.

In November 2024, Roach defeated DFL nominee Ian English in the general election for district 58B with 59% of the vote. He succeeded Pat Garofalo. Roach took office on January 7, 2025.

In January 2025, after Minnesota Secretary of State Steve Simon adjourned a session of the House for lack of quorum, Roach told Simon that his presiding over the House was "a sham" and that he "should not have the gavel". Minnesota law requires the secretary of state to convene the House when there is no speaker. A recent Supreme Court decision held that the House did not have a quorum and so could not elect a speaker.

On April 25, 2026, the Minnesota House of Representatives voted to pass Bill HF1606, a piece of legislation aimed at restricting AI tools from creating non-consensual nude images, notably child sexual abuse material (CSAM), thereby allowing legal action to be taken against creators and stopping the means of production. The bill passed by a vote of 132-1, with only Roach voting against it. Roach later wrote on X, "I voted against HF1606 the bill aimed at banning access to 'nudification' AI tools that create non-consensual deepfake nudes, because it is an ineffective, messaging bill that does little to actually stop determined bad actors."

== Electoral history ==
2024 Minnesota House of Representatives election, District 58B
Party	Candidate	Votes	%
Republican	Drew Roach	14,886	59.84
Democratic (DFL)	Ian English	9,962	40.05
Write-in		29	0.12
Total votes		24,877	100.00
Republican hold			
