= Julie Greene (politician) =

American politician (born 1972)

Member of the Minnesota House of Representatives from the 50A district
- Incumbent
- Assumed office January 14, 2025
- Preceded by: Heather Edelson

Personal details
- Born: February 16, 1972 (age 54)
- Party: Democratic (DFL)
- Spouse: Jon
- Children: 4
- Education: B.A. in Communications, University of Dayton, Ohio
- Occupation: Brand strategist; Legislator

Julie Greene is an American politician serving since 2025 as a member of the Minnesota House of Representatives. A member of the Minnesota Democratic–Farmer–Labor Party (DFL), Greene represents District 50A in the southwestern Twin Cities metropolitan area, which includes parts of Edina and Bloomington in Hennepin County.

== Early life and career ==
Greene was born on February 16, 1972, and raised in Chicago, Illinois, before earning a B.A. in communications from the University of Dayton, Ohio. She spent 25 years as a brand strategist, then served as vice chair of the Edina School Board from 2020 to 2024, chairing committees on policy and legislative action.

== Minnesota House of Representatives ==
In 2023, Heather Edelson resigned from the Minnesota House of Representatives after her election to the Hennepin County Board of Commissioners, leaving the seat open in the 2024 election. Greene announced her candidacy for the seat in December 2023. After defeating Alicia Gibson for the endorsement at the district DFL convention, she was the only DFL candidate to file for candidacy. In the general election, she defeated Republican nominee Owen Michaelson with 64.6% of the vote.

== Electoral history ==
2024 Minnesota House of Representatives election - District 50A
| Party | Candidate | Votes | % |
|---|---|---|---|
| Democratic (DFL) | Julie Greene | 16,766 | 64.57 |
| Republican | Owen Michaelson | 9,161 | 35.28 |
| Write-in | | 40 | 0.15 |
| Total votes | | 25,967 | 100.0 |
| Democratic (DFL) hold | | | |

== Personal life ==
Greene lives in Edina with her husband, Jon, and four children.
