= Dawn Gillman =

American politician

Member of the Minnesota House of Representatives from the 17A district
- Incumbent
- Assumed office January 3, 2023
- Preceded by: Glenn Gruenhagen

Personal details
- Born: October 8, 1973 (age 52)
- Party: Republican
- Spouse: Brian
- Children: 5
- Education: St. Cloud Technical and Community College
- Occupation: Business owner; Communications consultant; Legislator
- Website: Government website Campaign website

Dawn Gillman (born October 8, 1973) is an American politician serving in the Minnesota House of Representatives since 2023. A member of the Republican Party of Minnesota, Gillman represents District 17A in central Minnesota, which includes the cities of Hutchinson and Glencoe and parts of McLeod, Meeker, Sibley, and Wright Counties.

== Early life, education and career ==
Gillman attended St. Cloud Technical and Community College, earning a dental R.D.A. and C.D.A. She served six years on the Dassel city council before her election to the state legislature.

Gillman founded "Let Them Play", an organization advocating for reopening youth sports while statewide COVID-19 restrictions were in place. She said, "Our government should not restrict our kids' freedom. It's causing harm to their well-being without factual basis". The group sued the state of Minnesota, saying the measures violated youth athletes' right to equal protection, but a judge rejected the challenge.

== Minnesota House of Representatives ==
Gillman was elected to the Minnesota House of Representatives in 2022. She first ran after six-term Republican incumbent Glenn Gruenhagen announced he would run for a seat in the Minnesota Senate.

Gillman serves on the Environment and Natural Resources Finance and Policy, Human Services Finance, and Sustainable Infrastructure Policy Committees.

== Electoral history ==
2022 Minnesota State House - District 17A
| Party | Candidate | Votes | % |
|---|---|---|---|
| Republican | Dawn Gillman | 13,431 | 70.25 |
| Democratic (DFL) | Jennifer Carpentier | 5,659 | 29.60 |
| Write-in | | 29 | 0.15 |
| Total votes | | 19,119 | 100.0 |
| Republican hold | | | |

== Personal life ==
Gillman lives in Dassel, Minnesota, with her husband, Brian, and has five children. Her son Eli Gillman is a running back for the Montana Grizzlies.
