= Ned Carroll =

American politician

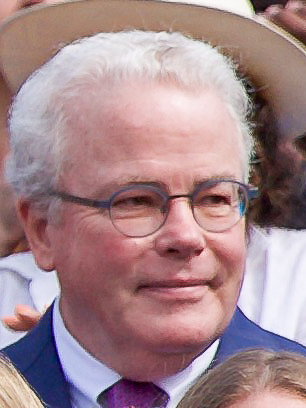

Member of the Minnesota House of Representatives from the 42A district
- Incumbent
- Assumed office January 3, 2023
- Preceded by: redistricted

Personal details
- Party: Democratic (DFL)
- Spouse: Maureen
- Children: 3
- Education: Cornell College (BSS); Rutgers University (MA); University of Iowa (JD)
- Occupation: Attorney; Legislator
- Website: Government website Campaign website

Ned Carroll is an American politician serving in the Minnesota House of Representatives since 2023. A member of the Minnesota Democratic-Farmer-Labor Party (DFL), Carroll represents District 42A in the western Twin Cities metropolitan area, which includes the cities of Plymouth and Maple Grove in Hennepin County.

== Early life, education and career ==
Carroll received his bachelor's degree in economics and political science from Cornell College in Iowa, and his master's degree in public policy analysis from Rutgers University. He earned a Juris Doctor from the University of Iowa College of Law.

Carroll works as a senior assistant attorney for Hennepin County. He served on the Plymouth city council for eight years before his election to the legislature, and as deputy mayor from 2019 to 2022. While on the council he supported a measure to hire a diversity, equity, and inclusion coordinator for the city.

== Minnesota House of Representatives ==
Carroll was elected to the Minnesota House of Representatives in 2022. He first ran for an open seat after 2022 legislative redistricting.

Carroll serves on the Capital Investment, Climate and Energy Finance and Policy, Health Finance and Policy, and Judiciary Finance and Civil Law Committees.

== Electoral history ==
2022 Minnesota State House - District 42A
Party	Candidate	Votes	%
Democratic (DFL)	Ned Carroll	12,018	58.03
Republican	Kathy Burkett	8,587	41.66
Write-in		9	0.04
Total votes		18,614	100.0
Democratic (DFL) hold			

2024 Minnesota State House - District 42A
Party	Candidate	Votes	%
Democratic (DFL)	Ned Carroll	14,288	57.3
Republican	Kathy Burkett	10,617	42.58
Write-in		31	0.12
Total votes		25,936	100.0
Democratic (DFL) hold			

== Personal life ==
Carroll lives in Plymouth, Minnesota, with his wife, Maureen, and has three children.
