= Mary Frances Clardy =

American politician (born 1958)

Member of the Minnesota House of Representatives from the 53A district
- Incumbent
- Assumed office January 3, 2023
- Preceded by: Tou Xiong

Personal details
- Born: November 15, 1958 (age 67)
- Party: Democratic (DFL)
- Children: 1
- Education: Minnesota State University, Mankato (BA); Grand Canyon University (MEd)
- Occupation: Educator; Legislator
- Website: Government website Campaign website

Mary Frances Clardy (born November 15, 1958) is an American teacher and politician serving in the Minnesota House of Representatives since 2023. A member of the Minnesota Democratic–Farmer–Labor Party (DFL), Clardy represents District 53A in the southeastern Twin Cities metropolitan area, which includes the cities of Inver Grove Heights, Sunfish Lake, Lilydale, and parts of both Mendota Heights and West St. Paul in Dakota County.

== Early life, education, and career ==
Clardy grew up in Burnsville, Minnesota, and received a Bachelor of Arts degree in psychology from Minnesota State University, Mankato, her teaching certificate from the University of St. Thomas, and a Master of Education from Grand Canyon University.

Clardy has worked as a teacher in Saint Paul, a housing advocate, and a civil rights commissioner. She became involved with the advocacy group Educators for Excellence and co-authored a policy paper proposing legislative solutions to recruit and retain teachers of color.

Clardy served on the Minneapolis Civil Rights Commission. Governor Mark Dayton appointed her to serve on the Minnesota Board of Teaching from 2014 to 2017, and Governor Tim Walz appointed her to the Minnesota Board of School Administrators in 2019. She has also served on the Inver Grove Heights School Board and the Board of the Association of Metropolitan School Districts.

== Minnesota House of Representatives ==
Clardy was elected to the Minnesota House of Representatives in 2022. She first ran for an open seat created by the 2022 legislative redistricting process.

Clardy serves as vice chair of the Education Finance Committee and sits on the Sustainable Infrastructure Policy, Veterans and Military Affairs Finance and Policy, and Human Services Finances Committees. She is a member of the House People of Color and Indigenous (POCI) Caucus and the Black Maternal Health Caucus.

=== Political positions ===
Clardy supports initiatives to recruit and retain more teachers of color in Minnesota schools, and authored a "safe schools" bill that would increase funding for school security, drug prevention, and cybersecurity. She also carried a proposal to help create a public awareness campaign about the effects of dementia and Alzheimer's disease in underserved communities.

== Electoral history ==
2024 Minnesota State House - District 53A
Party	Candidate	Votes	%
Democratic (DFL)	Mary Frances Clardy	14,011	57.73
Republican	Nathan Herschbach	10,226	42.14
	Write-in	31	0.13
Total votes		24,268	100.0
Democratic (DFL) hold			

2022 Minnesota State House - District 53A
Party	Candidate	Votes	%
Democratic (DFL)	Mary Frances Clardy	10,777	54.51
Republican	Todd Kruse	8,188	41.41
Legal Marijuana Now	Brent Jacobson	785	3.97
	Write-in	22	0.11
Total votes		19,772	100.0
Democratic (DFL) hold			

== Personal life ==
Clardy resides in Inver Grove Heights, Minnesota. She identifies as Black. While teaching in Saint Paul, Clardy was injured by a student and suffered a traumatic brain injury, having to relearn how to walk, talk, read, and write.

Clardy's daughter Virginia is a health care recruiter and former NBA dancer. Virginia was cast on the eighth season of Love Is Blind, and Clardy appeared on the show.
