= Terry Stier =

American politician (born 1978)

Member of the Minnesota House of Representatives from the 22B district
- Incumbent
- Assumed office January 6, 2025
- Preceded by: Brian Pfarr

Personal details
- Born: July 25, 1978 (age 47)
- Party: Republican

Terry Stier (born July 25, 1978) is an American politician. He has served since 2025 as a member of the Minnesota House of Representatives, representing district 22B. He is a member of the Republican Party.
