= Kim Hicks =

American politician (born 1982)

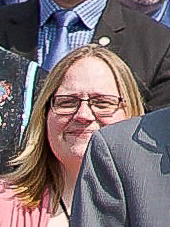

Member of the Minnesota House of Representatives from the 25A district
- Incumbent
- Assumed office January 3, 2023
- Preceded by: redistricted

Personal details
- Born: December 20, 1982 (age 43)
- Party: Democratic (DFL)
- Spouse: LaMar
- Children: 8
- Education: Winona State University (BA)
- Occupation: Human services; Legislator
- Website: Government website Campaign website

Kimberly C. Hicks (born December 20, 1982) is an American politician serving in the Minnesota House of Representatives since 2023. A member of the Minnesota Democratic-Farmer-Labor Party (DFL), Hicks represents District 25A in southeastern Minnesota, which includes northern parts of the city of Rochester and parts of Olmsted County.

== Early life, education and career ==
Hicks's family moved to Rochester, Minnesota, when she was a child, and she graduated from Rochester Public Schools. She attended college at Winona State University, earning a bachelor's degree in education. After being initially tested for dyslexia, Hicks was diagnosed with attention deficit hyperactivity disorder in the fourth grade.

== Minnesota House of Representatives ==
Hicks was first elected to the Minnesota House of Representatives in 2022. She first ran in 2020, unsuccessfully challenging five-term Republican incumbent Duane Quam. Hicks ran again in 2022, winning an open seat created by legislative redistricting.

Hicks serves on the Children and Families Finance and Policy, Higher Education Finance and Policy, Human Services Finance, and Human Services Policy Committees.

== Electoral history ==
2020 Minnesota State House - District 25A
Party	Candidate	Votes	%
Republican	Duane Quam (incumbent)	14,479	57.47
Democratic (DFL)	Kim Hicks	10,692	42.44
Write-in		21	0.08
Total votes		25,192	100.0
Republican hold			

2022 Minnesota State House - District 25A
Party	Candidate	Votes	%
Democratic (DFL)	Kim Hicks	9,797	55.21
Republican	Wendy Phillips	7,938	42.73
Write-in		10	0.06
Total votes		17,745	100.0
Democratic (DFL) hold			

2024 Minnesota State House - District 25A
Party	Candidate	Votes	%
Democratic (DFL)	Kim Hicks (incumbent)	13,085	55.98
Republican	Ken Navitsky	10,260	43.89
Write-in		29	0.12
Total votes		23,374	100.0
Democratic (DFL) hold			

== Personal life ==
Hicks lives in Rochester, Minnesota, with her spouse, LaMar, and has eight children.
