= Andy Smith (Minnesota politician) =

American politician (born 1991)

Member of the Minnesota House of Representatives from the 25B district
- Incumbent
- Assumed office January 3, 2023
- Preceded by: Liz Boldon

Personal details
- Born: May 24, 1991 (age 35)
- Party: Democratic (DFL)
- Spouse: Anna
- Education: Moody Bible Institute (BA); Westminster Seminary California (MDiv)
- Occupation: Business owner; Legislator
- Website: Government website Campaign website

Andrew Smith (born May 24, 1991) is an American politician serving in the Minnesota House of Representatives since 2023. A member of the Minnesota Democratic-Farmer-Labor Party (DFL), Smith represents District 25B in southeastern Minnesota, which includes downtown Rochester in Olmsted County.

== Early life, education and career ==
Smith attended Moody Bible Institute in Chicago, Illinois, earning a bachelor's degree in theology. He then attended Westminster Seminary California for his Master of divinity.

In 2019, Smith opened Gray Duck Theater in Rochester, a microcinema that showed independent and retro films. The theater permanently closed in February 2023 due to challenges arising from the COVID-19 pandemic, with Smith filing for bankruptcy in April 2023. His wife is the majority owner of Garden Party Books in Rochester.

== Minnesota House of Representatives ==
Smith was elected to the Minnesota House of Representatives in 2022. He first ran after legislative redistricting and after one-term DFL incumbent Liz Boldon announced she would run for a seat in the Minnesota Senate.

Smith serves on the Economic Development Finance and Policy, Health Finance and Policy, Sustainable Infrastructure Policy, and Taxes Committees.

=== Political positions ===
In January 2023, after a hearing on a bill codifying the right to an abortion, activists from the group Minnesota Right to Life targeted Smith and fellow representative Tina Liebling, following them from the committee room while filming and shouting at them. Smith, who was raised in a conservative Christian home, said he used to oppose abortion but now believes "women and those who are pregnant should have control over their own body and their medical decisions".

Smith has criticized the war on drugs and the crackdown on marijuana and psilocybin. He authored a bipartisan proposal in 2023 that formed a Psychedelic Medicine Task Force to advise the legislature on the legal, medical, and policy issues associated with legalizing psychedelic medicine in the state. The bill passed as part of the 2023 health budget and Smith was appointed to serve on the task force.

Smith spoke in favor of the DFL's paid family and medical leave proposal, saying, "we are lagging behind the rest of the world". He also said he offered his employees "unlimited paid vacation and sick time" even though by that time the theater was closed; the statement attracted sharp criticism from colleagues and local media. Smith supported legislation banning the practice of conversion therapy on minors and vulnerable adults, responding to questions about religious liberty by saying, "this freedom [of religious expression] is not a freedom to harm". In 2020, he said he supported citywide masking mandates in Rochester to help contain the spread of COVID-19.

Smith has advocated for a more equitable tax policy to avoid forcing "local people to make those decisions that they sent us here to make". He co-sponsored legislation to repeal a gag order on studying high-speed rail options between the Twin Cities and Rochester, saying passenger rail for southern Minnesota is "long overdue".

== Electoral history ==
2022 Minnesota State House - District 25B
Party	Candidate	Votes	%
Democratic (DFL)	Andrew Smith	10,040	64.04
Republican	John Joseph Robinson	5,634	35.94
Write-in		3	0.02
Total votes		15,677	100.0
Democratic (DFL) hold			

2024 Minnesota State House - District 25B
Party	Candidate	Votes	%
Democratic (DFL)	Andrew Smith	12,847	64.01
Republican	Wes Lund	7,184	35.79
Write-in		40	0.20
Total votes		20,071	100.0
Democratic (DFL) hold			

== Personal life ==
Smith lives in Rochester, Minnesota, with his wife, Anna.
