= Keith Allen (Minnesota politician) =

American politician (born 1977)

Member of the MN House of Representatives District 19A
- In office January 6th, 2025 – present
- Preceded by: Brian Daniels

Personal details
- Born: July 27, 1977 (age 48) Rochester, Minnesota, U.S.
- Party: Republican
- Spouse(s): Morgan Allen, m. 2003
- Children: 2
- Education: Hawkeye Community College University of Minnesota
- Profession: Farmer, small business owner
- Committees: Capital Investment Commerce Finance and Policy Higher Education Finance and Policy

Keith Allen (born July 27, 1977) is an American politician, farmer, and small business owner. He has served as a member of the Minnesota House of Representatives since 2025, representing District 19A. He is a member of the Republican Party.

== Early life, education, and professional career ==
Keith Allen was born on July 27, 1977, in Rochester, Minnesota. He graduated from Dover-Eyota High School in Eyota, Minnesota. He graduated from Hawkeye Community College with an A.S. in agriculture, agriculture operations, and related sciences. He then earned his B.S. in animal science at the University of Minnesota. He most recently attended Southwest Minnesota State University for the Minnesota Agriculture and Rural Leadership (MARL) Program focused on rural leadership.

Allen has an extensive career in agriculture and farming, serving in roles such as sales, customer service, and management, before starting a small business.

== Political career ==
Allen worked for U.S. Representative Brad Finstad as a District Outreach Representative during the 118th Congress.

=== Minnesota House of Representatives ===
Allen was sworn in on January 6, 2025, by Speaker Lisa Demuth.

"Got Milk" Bill

During the 2025 legislative session, his inaugural session, Allen chief-authored HF2387, a measure designed to reduce food waste in schools. The bill allows students to take a milk carton without taking an entire meal.

Preserving Girls Sports Act

Allen was a co-author and sponsor of HF12 during the 2025 legislative session. It bars transgender girls from participating in girls' sports.

Fraud

Allen was a co-author and sponsor of HF1, a bill to establish an Independent Office of the Inspector General.

Committees:

- Capital Investment
- Commerce Finance and Policy
- Higher Education Finance and Policy

== Personal life ==
Allen is involved in his community in the following groups/organizations:

- MN Farm Bureau
- Goodhue County Board of Adjustment
- Minnesota Agriculture and Rural Leadership Class 8
- Dale Lutheran Church Board President
- Cherry Grove Township Supervisor
