= Danny Nadeau =

American politician

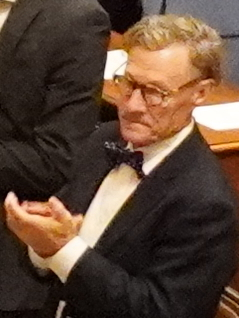
- Nadeau in 2025

Member of the Minnesota House of Representatives from the 34A district
- Incumbent
- Assumed office January 3, 2023
- Preceded by: redistricted
- Succeeded by: Jason Heaser (elect)

Personal details
- Born: May 15, 1965 (age 61)
- Party: Republican
- Children: 2
- Occupation: Contract manager; Legislator
- Website: Government website Campaign website

Danny Nadeau (born May 15, 1965) is an American politician serving in the Minnesota House of Representatives since 2023. A member of the Republican Party of Minnesota, Nadeau represents District 34A in the northwest Twin Cities metropolitan area, which includes the cities of Champlin and Rogers and parts of Hennepin and Wright Counties.

== Early life, education and career ==
A native of Medina, Minnesota, Nadeau has lived in Rogers for over two decades. He worked as Hassan Township administrator and served on the township's park board.

In 2008, Nadeau worked at the Minnesota House of Representatives in the House Republican Research department. From 2009 to 2010, he worked as a program manager at the State Energy Office at the Minnesota Department of Commerce.

In 2016, while Nadeau was deputy chair of Minnesota's 3rd Congressional District Republican executive committee, the group decided not to endorse Donald Trump for president, which Nadeau said "was a hard decision" but was made to help down-ballot candidates.

Nadeau worked as chief of staff to Hennepin County Commissioner Jeff Johnson for his 12 years on the county board, and worked on Johnson's 2014 and 2018 gubernatorial campaigns. When Johnson announced he would not run for reelection, Nadeau ran for the seat, gaining the endorsement of Johnson and the Star Tribune Editorial Board. He lost to technical architect Kevin Anderson.

== Minnesota House of Representatives ==
Nadeau was elected to the Minnesota House of Representatives in 2022. He first ran for an open seat created by legislative redistricting.

Nadeau serves on the Health Finance and Policy and State and Local Government Finance and Policy Committees.

Nadeau was unseated at the 2026 election.

=== Policy positions ===
Nadeau is anti-abortion and opposed the removal of the two-parent notification requirement for Minnesotans under 18 seeking abortion access. He opposed increasing funding to the Minnesota Attorney General's office to hire more criminal prosecutors, saying he would rather move attorneys in the consumer protection department. Nadeau voted against legislation ensuring workers would earn one hour of paid sick leave for every 30 hours worked, saying it was a burden on small businesses.

=== 2026 state convention moment of silence for Derek Chauvin ===
During the 2026 Minnesota Republican state convention, Nadeau served as convention chair. When a delegate moved to hold a moment of silent prayer for Derek Chauvin, who was convicted of murdering George Floyd in 2020, Nadeau said from the dais: "I said I preferred—I'll tell you what. I'm gonna put it to the body." After a voice vote, Nadeau led the convention in a 10-second moment of silence.

In an interview with KARE 11, Nadeau said he did not know at the time who made the motion, and said, "I recommended at that point he not, but it's his right as a delegate to make a motion."

The moment of silence drew widespread criticism, including from Minnesota Attorney General Keith Ellison, who called it "an act of profound cruelty", adding, "To honor a man who disgraced his oath to uphold the law and his badge is disturbing."

== Electoral history ==
2022 Minnesota State House - District 34A
Party	Candidate	Votes	%
Republican	Danny Nadeau	11,339	53.36
Democratic (DFL)	Brian Raines	9,903	46.60
Write-in		9	0.04
Total votes		21,251	100.0
Republican hold			

== Personal life ==
Nadeau lives in Rogers, Minnesota, and has two children.
