= Scott Van Binsbergen =

American politician

Member of the Minnesota House of Representatives from the 16A district
- Incumbent
- Assumed office January 6, 2025
- Preceded by: Dean Urdahl

Personal details
- Party: Republican

Scott Van Binsbergen is an American politician who has represented district 16A in the Minnesota House of Representatives since 2025. He is a member of the Republican Party.

== Political career ==
Van Binsbergen was elected to the Minnesota House in 2024, defeating DFL nominee Kathy Hegstad. He was reelected in 2026.
