= Thomas Sexton (Minnesota politician) =

American politician (born 1963)

Member of the Minnesota House of Representatives from the 19B district
- Incumbent
- Assumed office January 6, 2025
- Preceded by: John Petersburg

Personal details
- Born: February 15, 1963 (age 63)
- Party: Republican

Thomas Sexton (born February 15, 1963) is an American politician. A member of the Republican Party, he has served since 2025 as a member of the Minnesota House of Representatives, representing district 19B.
