= Patty Acomb =

American politician (born 1965)

Member of the Minnesota House of Representatives from the 45B district
- Incumbent
- Assumed office January 8, 2019
- Preceded by: Jon Applebaum

Personal details
- Born: September 28, 1965 (age 60) Minnetonka, Minnesota, U.S.
- Party: Democratic
- Spouse: Craig
- Children: 2
- Education: University of Minnesota (BS)
- Occupation: Legislator
- Website: Government website Campaign website

Patty Acomb (/ˈeɪkoʊm/ AY-kohm; born September 28, 1965) is an American politician serving in the Minnesota House of Representatives since 2019. A member of the Minnesota Democratic–Farmer–Labor Party (DFL), Acomb represents District 45B in the western Twin Cities metropolitan area, which includes the city of Minnetonka and parts of Hennepin County.

== Early life, education, and career ==
Acomb was born in Minnetonka, Minnesota, and graduated from Hopkins High School. She attended the University of Minnesota, graduating with a B.S. in natural resources.

Acomb has worked at the Minnesota Department of Natural Resources and the Hennepin County Environmental Services. She also worked on energy policy for the National League of Cities.

Acomb was elected to the Minnetonka Park Board in 2009 and then to the Minnetonka City Council from 2012 until her election to the state legislature. While a council member, she served on the Bassett Creek Watershed Management Commission, the Metropolitan Council Water Supply Advisory Committee, and the U.S. Environmental Protection Agency's governmental advisory committee. Governor Mark Dayton appointed Acomb to the Minnesota Board of Water and Soil Resources from 2015 to 2018.

== Minnesota House of Representatives ==
Acomb was elected to the Minnesota House of Representatives in 2018 and has been reelected every two years since. She first ran after two-term DFL incumbent Jon Applebaum announced he would not seek reelection.

Acomb chairs the Climate and Energy Finance and Policy Committee and sits on the Health Finance and Policy, Sustainable Infrastructure Policy, and Ways and Means Committees. In 2019, she founded and was named chair of the Minnesota House Climate Action Caucus. From 2021 to 2022, Acomb served as vice chair of the Climate and Energy Finance and Policy Committee.

=== Climate and energy ===
Acomb led efforts to move Minnesota to zero greenhouse gas emissions by 2050. She has supported weatherization, and stated she "preferred carrots rather than sticks" to incentivize a transition to a green economy. She authored legislation to give schools grants to install solar energy systems and incorporate teaching about energy into their curricula. She also proposed an amendment to bar public utilities from giving subsidies to builders to use natural gas. Acomb attended the COP26 climate change conference in Glasgow in 2021.

== Electoral history ==
2018 Minnesota State House - District 44B
Party	Candidate	Votes	%
Democratic (DFL)	Patty Acomb	15,082	62.74
Republican	Gary Porter	8,935	37.17
Write-in		21	0.09
Total votes		24,038	100.0
Democratic (DFL) hold			

2020 Minnesota State House - District 44B
Party	Candidate	Votes	%
Democratic (DFL)	Patty Acomb (incumbent)	17,340	62.29
Republican	Gary Porter	10,480	37.65
Write-in		16	0.06
Total votes		27,836	100.0
Democratic (DFL) hold			

2022 Minnesota State House - District 45B
Party	Candidate	Votes	%
Democratic (DFL)	Patty Acomb (incumbent)	14,915	62.05
Republican	Lorie Cousineau	9,108	37.89
Write-in		14	0.06
Total votes		24,037	100.0
Democratic (DFL) hold			

== Personal life ==
Acomb and her husband, Craig, have two children. She resides in Minnetonka, Minnesota.
