= Larry Kraft =

American politician

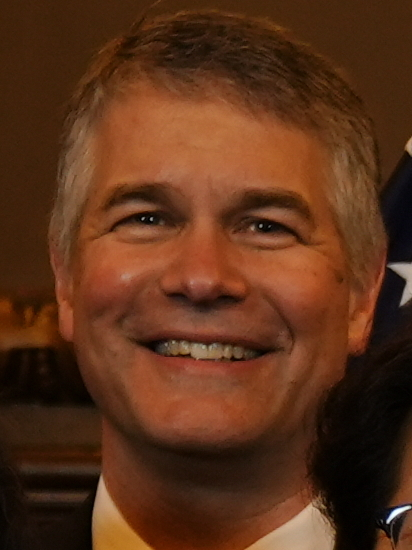

Member of the Minnesota House of Representatives from the 46A district
- Incumbent
- Assumed office January 3, 2023
- Preceded by: Ryan Winkler

Personal details
- Born: January 24, 1966 (age 60)
- Party: Democratic (DFL)
- Spouse: Lauri
- Children: 2
- Education: Cornell University (BS) (MBA)
- Occupation: Legislator
- Website: Government website Campaign website

Larry Kraft (born January 24, 1966) is an American politician serving in the Minnesota House of Representatives since 2023. A member of the Minnesota Democratic-Farmer-Labor Party (DFL), Kraft represents District 46A, which includes the city of St. Louis Park in the Twin Cities metropolitan area, and parts of Hennepin County.

== Early life, education and career ==
Kraft received his bachelor's degree in computer science and his masters in business administration from Cornell University. He was a member of the Alpha Tau Omega Fraternity.

Kraft worked in the tech industry but left to become executive director of iMatter, a national nonprofit based in the Twin Cities focused on youth activism pushing for solutions to climate change. He helped mentor student groups that advocated for St. Louis Park to adopt a climate action plan.

Kraft has served in many capacities for the city of St. Louis Park, including as a city council member, environment and sustainability commissioner, and a member of the climate action plan committee and the steering committee for St. Louis Park arts and culture strategic framework development. While on the city council, he was the lone dissenting vote on a ban of vaping products and e-cigarettes, saying it was getting ahead of federal regulations. In January 2022, Kraft led a coalition of 16 Minnesota cities that declared a climate emergency and urged the state legislature to address the crisis.

== Minnesota House of Representatives ==
Kraft was elected to the Minnesota House of Representatives in 2022. He first ran after redistricting and after seven-term DFL incumbent Ryan Winkler announced he would run for Hennepin County Attorney.

Kraft serves as vice chair of the Climate and Energy Finance and Policy Committee and sits on the Commerce Finance and Policy, Sustainable Infrastructure Policy, and Transportation Finance and Policy Committees.

Kraft supports political competition and primary challengers, even within his own party. On September 3, 2026, The Minnesota Star Tribune published his op-ed "Democracy means competition, even within political parties". In 2026, he endorsed DFL primary challenger Lynette Dumalag for MN State Senate. In his endorsement of Dumalag over Latz he wrote, "Lynette is also prepared to be a state legislator, with her wide range of experience in business, nonprofit board rooms, and local politics. As Board Chair of one of the largest affordable housing organizations in Minnesota; Sr. VP for a Commercial Real Estate company; and Ward 2 St. Louis Park City Councilmember – just to name a few of her credentials – Lynette's experience will help her understand issues, build strong relationships, and pass legislation."

In November 2026, Larry Kraft was named the new Technology Policy Committee Chair in the Minnesota House of Representatives. Rep. Kraft spent the majority of his career in the high-tech sector. According to BallotPedia, "Kraft earned a B.S. in computer science in 1987 and an M.B.A. in 1988, both from Cornell University. His career experience includes working as the vice president of marketing at ISDN Systems Corporation, at Netfax, at Advanced Switching Communications, and at Digi International."

Questions about data centers have been cutting through the two-party system in unexpected ways. Even stated environmentalists have been siding with corporate interests when it comes to data centers. Rep. Kraft voted "Yes" on House File 16 (HF16), the major Data Center Regulatory Bill, which passed the Minnesota House of Representatives on June 9, 2025. It implemented several complex trade-offs regarding data center operations in Minnesota. Rep. Kraft voted alongside a bipartisan majority consisting of 60 Republicans and 25 Democrats, also including Rep. Youakim.

== Electoral history ==
2022 Minnesota State House - District 46A
Party	Candidate	Votes	%
Democratic (DFL)	Larry Kraft	16,013	97.88
Write-in		347	2.12
Total votes		16,360	100.0
Democratic (DFL) hold			

== Personal life ==
Kraft lives in St. Louis Park, Minnesota, with his wife, Lauri, and has two children.
