= 2022 Hennepin County Attorney election =

- November 8, 2022
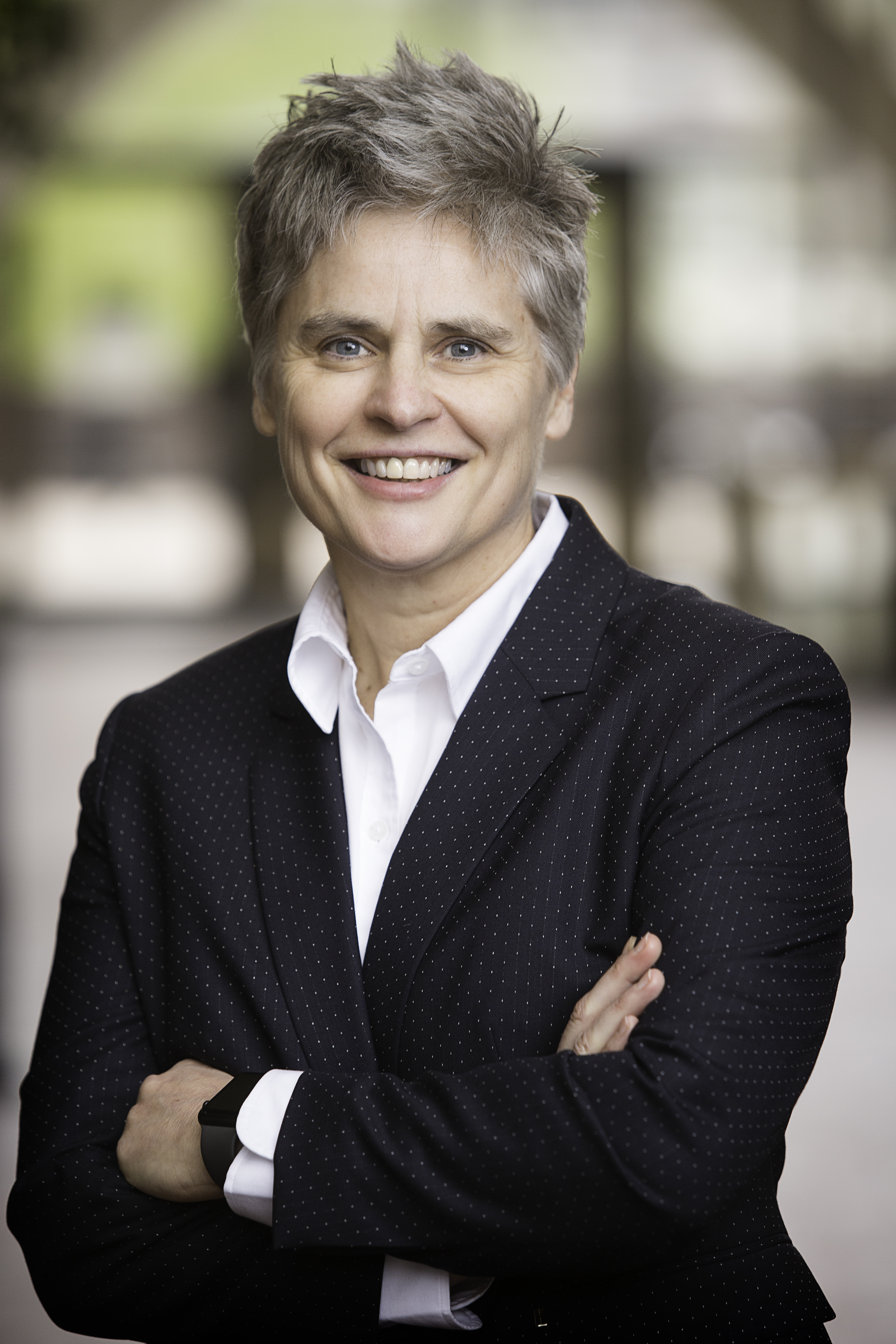

Candidate	Mary Moriarty	Martha Holton Dimick
Party	Nonpartisan	Nonpartisan
Popular vote	254,418	184,739
Percentage	57.59%	41.82%
- Results by precinct Moriarty: 40–50% 50–60% 60–70% 70–80% 80–90% Dimick: 40–50% 50–60% 60–70% No data
County Attorney before election
Michael O. Freeman
Nonpartisan
Elected County Attorney
Mary Moriarty
Nonpartisan

The 2022 Hennepin County Attorney election was held on November 8, 2022, to elect the county attorney of Hennepin County, Minnesota. On September 1, 2021, incumbent county attorney Michael O. Freeman announced that he would retire at the end of his term after 24 years in the role. Former Hennepin County Chief Public Defender Mary Moriarty defeated former Hennepin County judge Martha Holton Dimick and became the first openly LGBTQ woman elected as Hennepin County Attorney.

== Primary election ==
=== Candidates ===
==== Advanced to general ====
- Martha Holton Dimick, former Minneapolis deputy city attorney and former judge of Minnesota's 4th judicial district
- Mary Moriarty, former chief public defender of Hennepin County

==== Eliminated in primary ====
- Jarvis Jones, attorney and former president of the Minnesota State Bar Association
- Tad Jude, former judge of Minnesota's 10th judicial district
- Paul Ostrow, former Minneapolis city council president and candidate for Minnesota's 5th congressional district in 2006
- Saraswati Singh, assistant Ramsey County prosecutor and former assistant attorney general
- Ryan Winkler, majority leader of the Minnesota House of Representatives

==== Withdrawn ====
- Simon Trautmann, attorney and Richfield city councilman

==== Declined ====
- Cedrick Frazier, state representative (endorsed Moriarty)
- Michael O. Freeman, incumbent county attorney (endorsed Dimick)

=== Endorsements ===
Martha Holton Dimick

Local officials

- Jacob Frey, mayor of Minneapolis
- Lisa Goodman, Minneapolis city councilwoman
- Barb Johnson, former Minneapolis city council president
- Michael Rainville, Minneapolis city councilman
- Latrisha Vetaw, Minneapolis city councilwoman

Newspapers

- Star Tribune (co-endorsed with Winkler)
Tad Jude

Local officials

- Richard W. Stanek, former sheriff of Hennepin County (2007–2019)
Mary Moriarty

U.S. representatives

- Ilhan Omar, U.S. representative for Minnesota's 5th congressional district

State officials

- Keith Ellison, Attorney General of Minnesota

State legislators

- Scott Dibble, state senator
- Cedrick Frazier, state representative

Organizations

- Hennepin County Democratic–Farmer–Labor Party
- LGBTQ Victory Fund
- LPAC
- Minnesota Democratic–Farmer–Labor Party
- Real Justice PAC
- TakeAction Minnesota

Labor unions

- National Association of Social Workers Minnesota Chapter
Paul Ostrow

U.S. senators

- David Durenberger, former U.S. senator from Minnesota (1978–1995)

State officials

- Arne Carlson, former governor of Minnesota (1991–1999)
Saraswati Singh

State legislators

- Esther Agbaje, state representative
- Athena Hollins, state representative

Local officials

- John Choi, Ramsey County county attorney

Organizations

- Run for Something
Ryan Winkler

State legislators

- Melissa Hortman, speaker of the Minnesota House of Representatives

Labor unions

- IBEW Local 292
- IUPAT District Council 82
- LiUNA Minnesota & North Dakota
- Minnesota AFSCME Council 5
- Minneapolis Regional Labor Federation AFL–CIO
- SEIU Healthcare Minnesota & Iowa
- SEIU Local 284
- SMART Local 10
- Teamsters Joint Council 32
- Teamsters Local 120
- UFCW Local 1189
- UNITE HERE Local 17
- United Steelworkers District 11

Newspapers

- Star Tribune (co-endorsed with Dimick)

=== Forums ===
2022 Hennepin County Attorney nonpartisan primary candidate forums
No.	Date	Host	Moderator	Link	Nonpartisan	Nonpartisan	Nonpartisan	Nonpartisan	Nonpartisan	Nonpartisan	Nonpartisan	Nonpartisan
Key: P Participant A Absent N Not invited I Invited W Withdrawn												
Key: P Participant A Absent N Not invited I Invited W Withdrawn					Martha Holton Dimick	Jarvis Jones	Tad Jude	Mary Moriarty	Paul Ostrow	Saraswati Singh	Simon Trautmann	Ryan Winkler
1	Mar. 29, 2022	Minneapolis–St. Paul; American Constitution Society	Tane Danger	YouTube	P	N (Note: Was not yet a candidate)	N	P	P	P	P	P
2	May 5, 2022	Minneapolis Foundation; Minnesota Justice Research Center	Nadine Graves; Mark Haase	YouTube	P	N	N	P	P	P	P	P
3	May 11, 2022	Minneapolis Justice Coalition	Toussaint Morrison	YouTube	A	P	N	P	N	P	N	A
4	Jun. 28, 2022	League of Women Voters	Laura Helmer	YouTube	P	P	P	P	P	P	W	P
5	Jul. 27, 2022	Building Owners & Managers; Association of Minneapolis; Minneapolis Downtown Council; Minneapolis Regional Chamber	DeWayne Davis	YouTube	P	P	P	P	P	P	W	P

=== Results ===
Nonpartisan primary results
Party	Candidate	Votes	%
Nonpartisan	Mary Moriarty	62,336	36.36
Nonpartisan	Martha Holton Dimick	30,668	17.89
Nonpartisan	Ryan Winkler	27,924	16.29
Nonpartisan	Tad Jude	18,142	10.58
Nonpartisan	Paul Ostrow	14,500	8.46
Nonpartisan	Saraswati Singh	12,280	7.16
Nonpartisan	Jarvis Jones	5,586	3.26
Total votes		171,436	100.00

== General election ==
=== Forums and debate ===
A candidate forum was held on September 29, and a second forum was held via Zoom on October 18. A debate was held on October 14 on Twin Cities Public Television's Almanac program.

2022 Hennepin County Attorney forums and debate
No.	Date	Host	Moderator	Link	Nonpartisan	Nonpartisan
Key: P Participant A Absent N Not invited I Invited W Withdrawn						
Key: P Participant A Absent N Not invited I Invited W Withdrawn					Martha Holton Dimick	Mary Moriarty
1	Sep. 29, 2022	League of Women Voters Minneapolis	Linda McLoon	YouTube	**P**	**P**
2	Oct. 14, 2022	Twin Cities Public Television	Eric Eskola; Cathy Wurzer	PBS	**P**	**P**
3	Oct. 18, 2022	Minnesota Justice Research Center	Andy Martens	YouTube	**P**	**P**

=== Endorsements ===
Endorsements in bold were made after the primary.

Martha Holton Dimick

U.S. representatives

- **Dean Phillips**, U.S. Representative for Minnesota's 3rd congressional district

Mayors

- **Jim Adams**, mayor of Crystal
- **Todd Carlson**, mayor of Excelsior
- **Ron Case**, mayor of Eden Prairie
- Jacob Frey, mayor of Minneapolis
- **James Hovland**, mayor of Edina
- **Rick Ihli**, mayor of Rogers
- **Lisa Jacobson**, mayor of Brooklyn Park
- **Brad Johnson**, mayor of Greenfield
- **Marvin Johnson**, mayor of Independence
- **Ryan Karasek**, mayor of Champlin
- **Chris Kauffman**, mayor of Hanover
- **Kent Koch**, mayor of Loretto
- **Jennifer Labadie**, mayor of Shorewood
- **Jaci Lindstrom**, mayor of Minnetonka Beach
- **Julie Maas-Kusske**, mayor of Maple Plain
- **Kathleen Martin**, mayor of Medina
- **Tom McKee**, mayor of Corcoran
- **Melissa McNeill**, mayor of Deephaven
- **Charlie Miner**, mayor of Long Lake
- **Johanna Mouton**, mayor of Wayzata
- **Duane Poppe**, mayor of Osseo
- **Ray Salazar**, mayor of Mound
- **Jake Spano**, mayor of St. Louis Park
- **Mark Steffenson**, mayor of Maple Grove
- **Randy Stille**, mayor of St. Anthony
- **Vince Suerth**, mayor of Woodland
- **Kerry Taylor**, mayor of St. Bonifacius
- **Brad Weirsum**, mayor of Minnetonka
- **Lisa Whalen**, mayor of Minnetrista
- **Jeffrey Wosje**, mayor of Plymouth

Local officials

- **Michael O. Freeman**, incumbent county attorney
- Lisa Goodman, Minneapolis city councilwoman
- Barb Johnson, former Minneapolis city council president
- Michael Rainville, Minneapolis city councilman
- **Don Samuels**, former Minneapolis city councilman
- Latrisha Vetaw, Minneapolis city councilwoman

Newspapers

- Star Tribune
Mary Moriarty

U.S. representatives

- Ilhan Omar, U.S. representative for Minnesota's 5th congressional district

State officials

- **Julie Blaha**, Minnesota State Auditor
- Keith Ellison, Attorney General of Minnesota

State legislators

- Scott Dibble, state senator
- Cedrick Frazier, state representative

Local officials

- **Angela Conley**, Hennepin County commissioner
- **Irene Fernando**, Hennepin County commissioner
- **Marion Greene**, chair of the Hennepin County board of commissioners

Individuals

- **John Legend**, singer
- **Mark Osler**, law professor at University of St. Thomas School of Law

Organizations

- **Color of Change PAC**
- Hennepin County Democratic–Farmer–Labor Party
- LGBTQ Victory Fund
- LPAC
- Minnesota Democratic–Farmer–Labor Party
- **People's Action**
- Real Justice PAC
- TakeAction Minnesota
- **Working Families Party**

Labor unions

- National Association of Social Workers Minnesota Chapter
- **Teamsters Joint Council 32** (endorsed Winkler in primary)

=== Results ===
2022 Hennepin County Attorney election
Party	Candidate	Votes	%
**Nonpartisan**	**Mary Moriarty**	**254,418**	**57.59**
Nonpartisan	Martha Holton Dimick	184,739	41.82
Write-in		2,589	0.59
Total votes		**441,746**	**100.00**

By municipality

Municipality	Mary Moriarty		Martha Holton Dimick		Write-in		Margin		Total
Municipality	#	%	#	%	#	%	#	%	Total
Bloomington	17,903	55.29%	14,265	44.05%	215	0.66%	3,638	11.24%	32,383
Brooklyn Center	3,916	58.64%	2,718	40.70%	44	0.66%	1,198	17.94%	6,678
Brooklyn Park	12,039	55.69%	9,446	43.70%	131	0.61%	2,593	11.99%	21,616
Champlin	5,066	57.09%	3,738	42.13%	69	0.78%	1,328	14.96%	8,873
Corcoran	1,447	53.49%	1,239	45.80%	19	0.70%	208	7.69%	2,705
Crystal	4,338	59.27%	2,924	39.95%	57	0.78%	1,414	19.32%	7,319
Dayton (Note: Partially located outside of Hennepin County)	1,818	55.06%	1,463	44.31%	21	0.64%	355	10.75%	3,302
Deephaven	771	44.13%	970	55.52%	6	0.34%	199	11.39%	1,747
Eden Prairie	12,593	54.53%	10,402	45.04%	98	0.42%	2,191	9.49%	23,093
Edina	10,090	46.97%	11,291	52.56%	103	0.48%	1,201	5.59%	21,484
Excelsior	438	51.96%	402	47.69%	3	0.36%	36	4.27%	843
Fort Snelling (Note: Unorganized territory)	44	69.84%	18	28.57%	1	1.59%	24	41.27%	63
Golden Valley	5,440	53.53%	4,665	45.90%	58	0.57%	775	7.63%	10,163
Greenfield	596	51.42%	551	47.54%	12	1.04%	45	3.88%	1,159
Greenwood	170	51.36%	160	48.34%	1	0.30%	10	3.02%	331
Hanover	130	49.43%	131	49.81%	2	0.76%	1	0.38%	263
Hopkins	3,160	56.40%	2,400	42.83%	43	0.77%	760	13.57%	5,603
Independence	777	50.92%	739	48.43%	10	0.66%	38	2.49%	1,526
Long Lake	348	52.81%	310	47.04%	1	0.15%	38	5.77%	659
Loretto	131	54.13%	111	45.87%	0	0.00%	20	8.26%	242
Maple Grove	13,974	54.36%	11,557	44.95%	177	0.69%	2,417	9.41%	25,708
Maple Plain	310	48.67%	321	50.39%	6	0.94%	11	1.72%	637
Medicine Lake	79	50.00%	78	49.37%	1	0.63%	1	0.63%	158
Medina	1,149	48.96%	1,188	50.62%	10	0.43%	39	1.66%	2,347
Minneapolis	91,822	64.63%	49,472	34.82%	772	0.54%	42,350	29.81%	142,066
Minnetonka	12,253	51.96%	11,209	47.53%	119	0.50%	1,044	4.43%	23,581
Minnetonka Beach	124	47.69%	136	52.31%	0	0.00%	12	4.62%	260
Minnetrista	1,749	51.50%	1,627	47.91%	20	0.59%	122	3.59%	3,396
Mound	1,991	54.73%	1,618	44.47%	29	0.80%	373	10.26%	3,638
New Hope	3,654	58.60%	2,535	40.65%	47	0.75%	1,119	17.95%	6,236
Orono	1,700	47.14%	1,896	52.58%	10	0.28%	196	5.44%	3,606
Osseo	523	57.35%	379	41.56%	10	1.10%	144	15.79%	912
Plymouth	15,515	52.08%	14,110	47.37%	164	0.55%	1,405	4.71%	29,789
Richfield	7,100	60.11%	4,620	39.11%	92	0.78%	2,480	21.00%	11,812
Robbinsdale	2,999	59.07%	2,049	40.36%	29	0.57%	950	18.71%	5,077
Rockford	53	59.55%	35	39.33%	1	1.12%	18	20.22%	89
Rogers	2,604	55.48%	2,051	43.69%	39	0.83%	553	11.79%	4,694
Shorewood	1,600	48.02%	1,713	51.41%	19	0.57%	113	3.39%	3,332
Spring Park	318	53.00%	276	46.00%	6	1.00%	42	7.00%	600
St. Anthony	1,492	59.37%	1,007	40.07%	14	0.56%	485	19.30%	2,513
St. Bonifacius	491	59.09%	328	39.47%	12	1.44%	163	19.62%	831
St. Louis Park	10,367	58.77%	7,165	40.62%	108	0.61%	3,202	18.15%	17,640
Tonka Bay	363	51.42%	339	48.02%	4	0.57%	24	3.40%	706
Wayzata	883	47.86%	956	51.82%	6	0.33%	73	3.96%	1,845
Woodland	90	40.72%	131	59.28%	0	0.00%	41	18.56%	221
Totals	254,418	57.59%	184,739	41.82%	2,589	0.59%	69,679	15.77%	441,746

== See also ==
- List of County Attorneys of Hennepin County
