= 2026 Hennepin County Attorney election =

Local election in Minnesota

- November 3, 2026
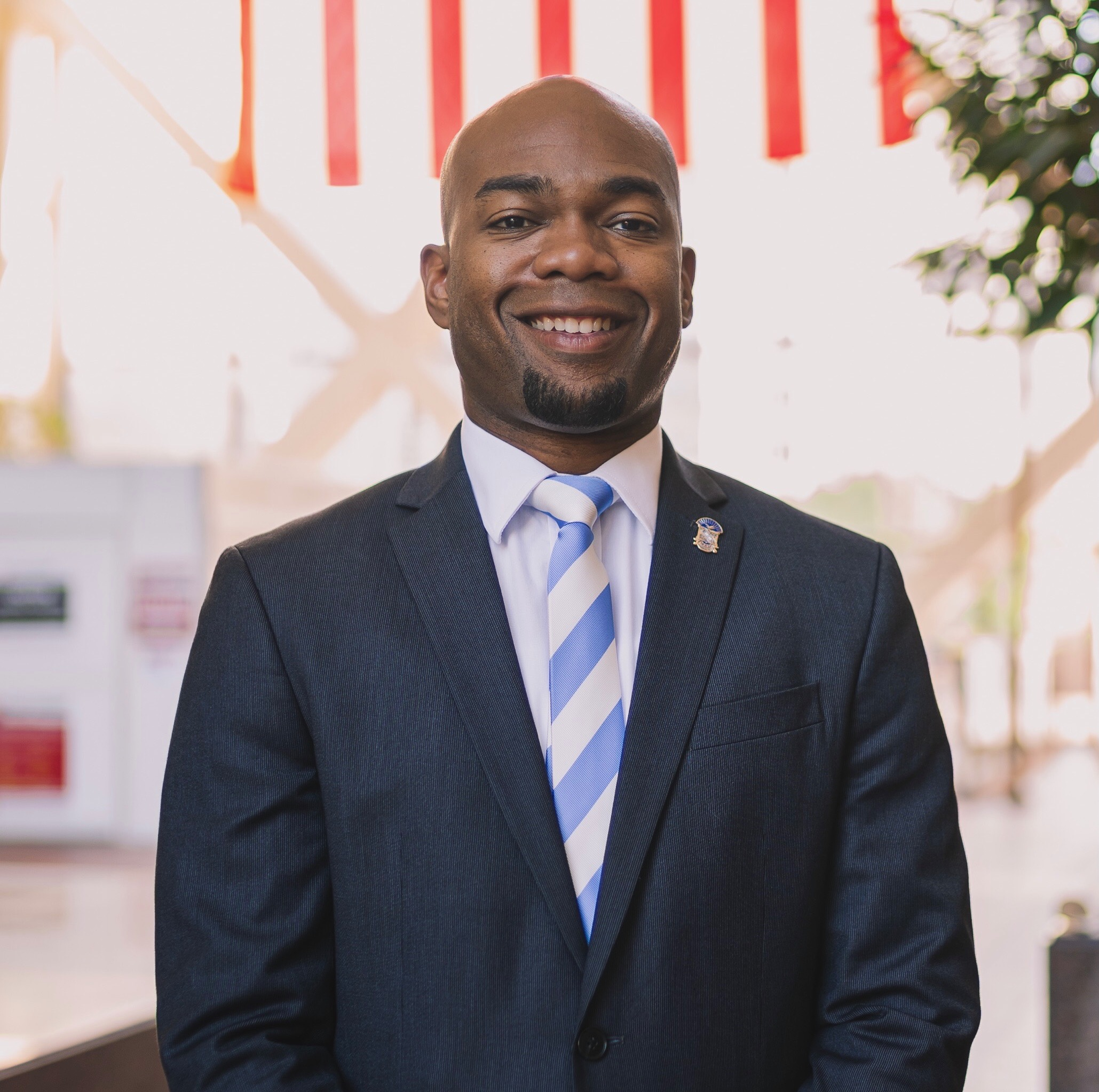

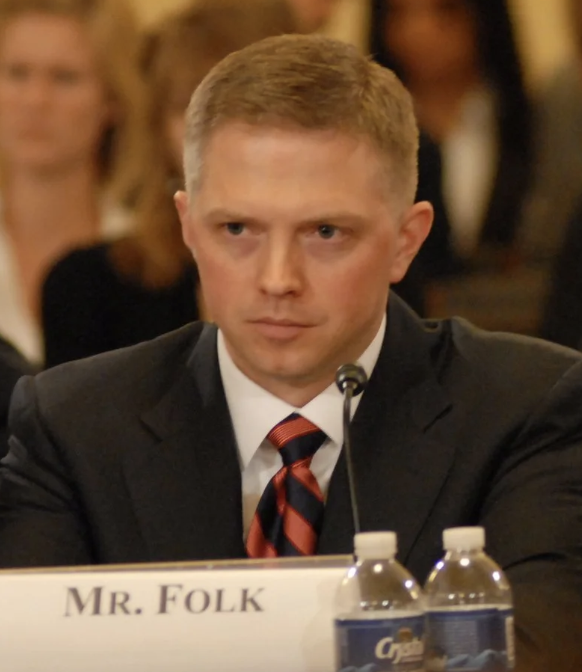
Candidate	Cedrick Frazier	Anders Folk
Party	Nonpartisan	Nonpartisan
Popular vote	257,801	249,253
Percentage	50.58%	48.90%
- Results by precinct Frazier: 40–50% 50–60% 60–70% 70–80% 80–90% Folk: 40–50% 50–60% 60–70% 70–80% No Votes
County Attorney before election
Mary Moriarty
Nonpartisan
Elected County Attorney
Cedrick Frazier
Nonpartisan

The 2026 Hennepin County Attorney election was held on November 3, 2026, with a primary being held on August 11, to elect the county attorney of Hennepin County, Minnesota. On August 7, 2025, incumbent county attorney Mary Moriarty announced that she would not seek re-election to a second term in office.

== Primary election ==
=== Candidates ===
==== Advanced to general ====
- Anders Folk, former acting U.S. Attorney for the District of Minnesota
- Cedrick Frazier, state representative

==== Eliminated in primary ====
- Diane Krenz, Hubbard County special assistant attorney
- Hao Quang Nguyen, Ramsey County assistant attorney
- Matt Pelikan, lawyer and candidate for Attorney General in 2018

==== Withdrew ====
- Francis X. Shen, University of Minnesota neurolaw professor (endorsed Folk)

==== Declined ====
- Martha Holtom Dimick, former judge of Minnesota's 4th judicial district and runner-up for county attorney in 2022
- Keith Ellison, Attorney General of Minnesota (running for re-election, endorsed Frazier and Nguyen)
- Chris Madel, attorney who represented Ryan Londregan (ran for governor)
- Mary Moriarty, incumbent county attorney
- Joe Thompson, former acting U.S. Attorney for the District of Minnesota
- Ryan Winkler, former Majority Leader of the Minnesota House of Representatives and candidate for county attorney in 2022 (running for state house, endorsed Folk)

=== Endorsements ===
Anders Folk

U.S. attorneys

- Andrew Luger, former U.S. Attorney for the District of Minnesota (2014–2017, 2022–2025)
- B. Todd Jones, former U.S. Attorney for the District of Minnesota (1998-2001, 2009-2013)

State legislators

- Ryan Winkler, former Majority Leader of the Minnesota House of Representatives

Local officials

- Jacob Frey, Mayor of Minneapolis
- Dawanna Witt, Hennepin County Sheriff

Individuals

- Francis X. Shen, former candidate and neurolaw professor
Cedrick Frazier

U.S. representatives

- Ilhan Omar, MN-05

Statewide officials

- Keith Ellison, Attorney General of Minnesota (co-endorsement with Nguyen)
- Peggy Flanagan, Lieutenant Governor of Minnesota

Individuals

- Larry Krasner, District Attorney of Philadelphia

Organizations

- Hennepin County Democratic-Farmer-Labor Party
- Working Families Party
Hao Quang Nguyen

Statewide officials

- Keith Ellison, Attorney General of Minnesota (co-endorsement with Frazier)

Local officials

- John Choi, Ramsey County Attorney

=== Forums ===
2026 Hennepin County Attorney nonpartisan primary candidate forums
No.	Date	Host	Moderator	Link	Nonpartisan	Nonpartisan	Nonpartisan	Nonpartisan	Nonpartisan
Key: P Participant A Absent N Not invited I Invited W Withdrawn									
Key: P Participant A Absent N Not invited I Invited W Withdrawn					Anders Folk	Cedrick Frazier	Hao Quang Nguyen	Matt Pelikan	Francis X. Shen
1	Mar. 31, 2026	Minnesota Democratic–Farmer–Labor Party; Senior Caucus Minneapolis area chapter	Cara Letofsky; Diane Solinger	YouTube	P	P	P	P	P
2	Jun. 25, 2026	League of Women Voters of Golden Valley	Florence Sprague	YouTube	P	P	P	P	P

=== Results ===
Primary election results map

Frazier

30–40%
40–50%
50–60%
60–70%
80–90%

Folk

20–30%
30–40%
40–50%
50–60%
60–70%

Krenz

20–30%
30–40%
40–50%

Nguyen

30–40%

Other

20–30% Tie
No Votes

Nonpartisan primary results
Party	Candidate	Votes	%
Nonpartisan	Cedrick Frazier	87,447	35.95
Nonpartisan	Anders Folk	55,610	22.86
Nonpartisan	Diane Krenz	46,150	18.97
Nonpartisan	Hao Nguyen	36,424	14.97
Nonpartisan	Matt Pelikan	17,648	7.25
Total votes		243,279	100.00

== General election ==
=== Results ===
2026 Hennepin County Attorney election
Party	Candidate	Votes	%
Nonpartisan	Cedrick Frazier	257,445	50.58%
Nonpartisan	Anders Folk	249,145	48.90%
Write-in			
Total votes			

== See also ==
- List of county attorneys of Hennepin County
