= List of county attorneys of Hennepin County =

County Attorneys of Hennepin County, Minnesota

This is a partial list of county attorneys of Hennepin County. All officeholders are officially nonpartisan. Due to a lack of proper documentation, information about the position prior to the election of William Nash in 1918 is scarce.

County Attorneys of Hennepin County
Image	County Attorney	Term	Elected
	George R. Robinson	1867	
	James W. Lawrence	1872-1876 or 1877-1878 (Note: sources conflict on term)	
	John G. Woolley	~ 1883	
	Robert Jamison	1889-1892	1888
	L. R. Thian	1892	
	James A. Peterson	1897-1899	1896
	Louis A. Reed	1899-1900	1898
	Al. J. Smith	C. 1905-1910	
	James Robertson	C. 1914	
	John M. Rees	C.1918-1919	
	William Nash	1919-1920 (Note: Removed by Governor Burnquist after suspected involvement in an illegal international alcohol business)	1918
	Floyd B. Olson	1920-1930 (Note: resigned early after being elected Governor of Minnesota)	1920; 1922; 1926; 1928
	Edward J. Goff	1931-1942 (Note: Died in Office)	1930; 1934; 1938
	Michael J. Dillon	1943-1955	1942; 1946; 1950
	George M. Scott	1955-1973 (Note: Resigned after being appointed to the Minnesota Supreme Court by Governor Wendell Anderson)	1954; 1958; 1962; 1966; 1970
	Gary Flakne	1973-1979	1974
	Tom Johnson	1979-1991	1978; 1982; 1986
	Michael O. Freeman	1991-1999	1990; 1994
	Amy Klobuchar	1999-2007	1998; 2002
	Michael O. Freeman	2007-2023	2006; 2010; 2014; 2018
	Mary Moriarty	2023-	2022
	Cedrick Frazier	Elect, takes office January 4 2027	2026
