= Erica MacDonald =

American attorney and state judge (born 1967)

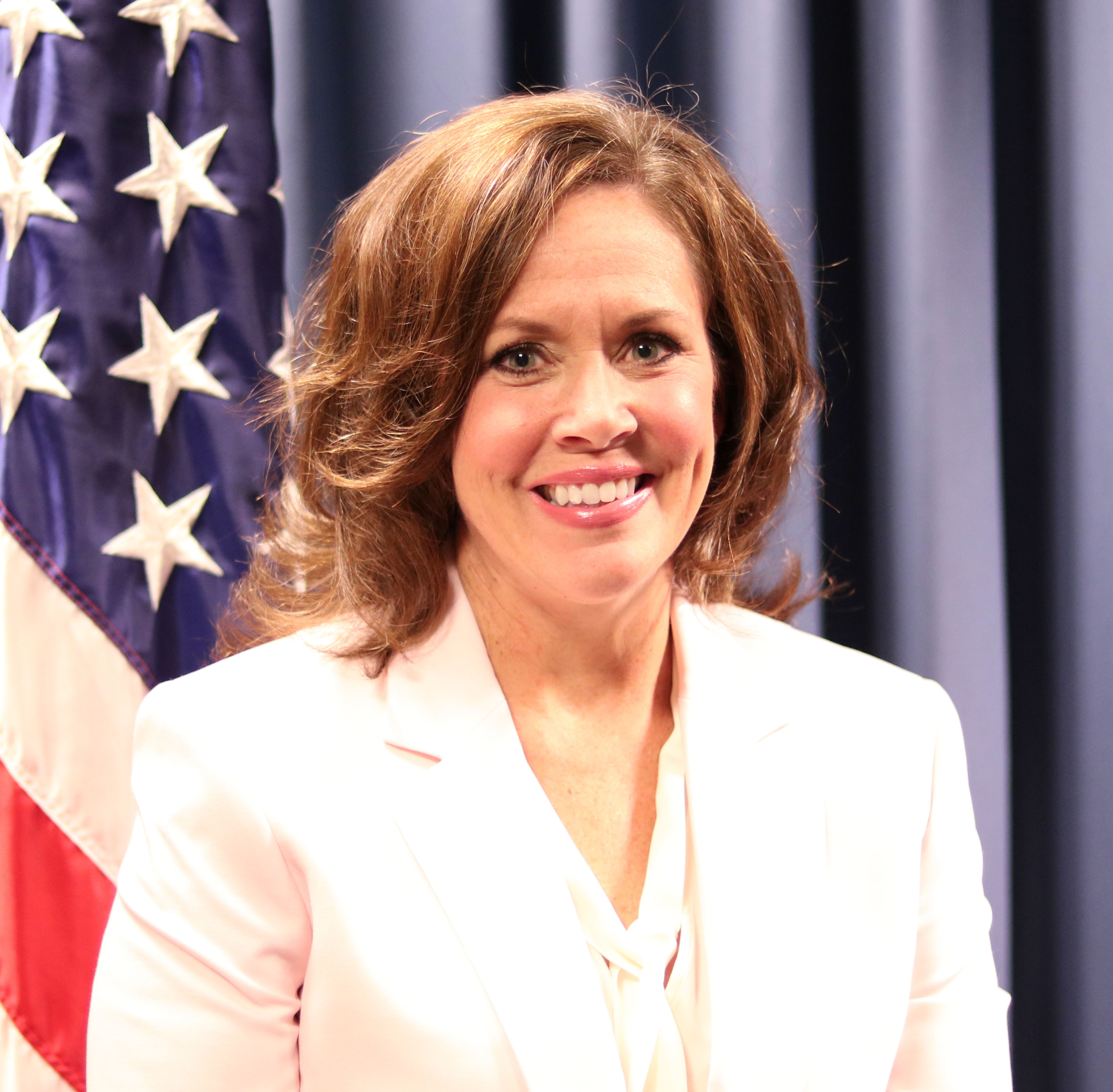

United States Attorney for the District of Minnesota
- In office June 11, 2018 – February 28, 2021
- President: Donald Trump; Joe Biden
- Preceded by: Andrew M. Luger
- Succeeded by: Anders Folk (acting)

Personal details
- Born: Erica Irene Hinkle; February 3, 1967 (age 59) Greenwich, Connecticut, U.S.
- Party: Republican
- Education: University of Notre Dame (BA); DePaul University (JD)

Erica Irene Hinkle MacDonald (born February 3, 1967) is an American lawyer who served from 2018 to 2021 as the United States Attorney for the District of Minnesota. She served as a judge of the District Court for the First Judicial District from 2010 to 2018; as an Assistant United States Attorney from 2000 to 2009; a litigation associate in 2000; and a federal judicial law clerk from 1997 to 1999.

== Early life and education ==
MacDonald was born in Greenwich, Connecticut. Her family moved to Texas when she was an infant. She was raised in the Dallas, Texas area, the youngest of three girls raised by single mother Evelyn Hinkle. MacDonald attended Bishop Dunne High School, graduating in 1985 as class salutatorian.

MacDonald earned her Bachelor of Arts from the University of Notre Dame. She majored in American Studies with a concentration in business. She was a member of the Dean's List from 1986 to 1989.

After earning her undergraduate degree, she spent five years working in management for a St. Louis department store. She quickly rose up the ranks from an Assistant Buyer in 1989 to being named a Buyer in 1992 at age 25. As a Buyer she managed a multi-million-dollar business. In 1994, she was named Outstanding Buyer of the Year.

MacDonald attended DePaul University College of Law from 1994 to 1997. While there, she worked as a Legal Writing Teaching Assistant and research assistant to a criminal law professors. She also served on the DePaul Law Review as a Staff Member in 1995-96 and Managing Editor of Lead Articles in 1996-97. MacDonald earned her Juris Doctor in 1997, graduating with top honors. She was named to the Order of the Coif.

== Legal career ==
MacDonald began her legal career as a judicial law clerk to United States District Judge James Alesia of the Northern District of Illinois. After her clerkship, she worked as an associate at Kirkland & Ellis in Chicago; as an Assistant United States Attorney in the Northern District of Illinois; and as a law clerk to Judge Harriet Lansing of the Minnesota Court of Appeals in 2000. She also served eight years as an Assistant United States Attorney in the District of Minnesota.

From 2000 to 2009, MacDonald served as Assistant United States Attorney in Minneapolis. During that tenure, she prosecuted cases involving violent crimes, narcotics, firearms, white-collar crimes, tax and mortgage fraud, human trafficking and child pornography. She worked to prosecute crimes against women and children on the Red Lake Indian Reservation, where she helped to establish a family advocacy center. She prosecuted Minnesota's first human trafficking cases, "winning some of the longest federal sentences ever delivered in Minnesota". She served on the office's management team as Senior Litigation Counsel from 2007 to 2009.

As an AUSA, MacDonald helped lead the fight against human trafficking. She was the Office Human Trafficking Point of Contact from 2006 to 2009; chaired the Gerald D. Vick Human Trafficking Task Force; and co-chaired the Minnesota Human Trafficking Task Force from 2006 to 2009.

== State judicial service ==
On November 24, 2009, Governor Tim Pawlenty appointed MacDonald a judge for the First Judicial District. She was elected to a six-year term in 2012.

MacDonald served over eight years as a trial court judge presiding over the full panoply of cases arising in state court, including criminal, civil, family, housing, juvenile and specialty courts. She presided over jury trials, bench trials and evidentiary hearings. She was a presiding judge in two specialty courts: the Dakota County Adult Drug Court and Juvenile Court. She worked to improve courthouse security as co-chair of the Dakota County Court Security Committee and improve operations and efficiencies of the justice system through leadership on the Dakota County Project Steering Committee for National Center for State Courts.

MacDonald was a frequent lecturer and guest speaker. She worked to train and mentor other judges by serving as a faculty member at the Judicial Trial Skills Program for New Judges; co-chair of and contributing author to the MDJF Judge Handbook; and frequent speaker and presenter at the MDJF Annual Conference of Judges.

In 2016, MacDonald was elected by peers statewide to serve at the Vice President of the Minnesota District Judges Foundation (“MDJF”) from 2016 to 2018. She served in this role until June 5, 2018, when she resigned in order to become the U.S. Attorney for the District of Minnesota.

== United States Attorney ==
On April 10, 2018, President Donald Trump announced his intent to nominate MacDonald to serve as U.S. Attorney of Minnesota. On April 12, 2018, her nomination was sent to the Senate. On May 24, 2018, her nomination was reported out of committee by a voice vote. The Senate confirmed her nomination by voice vote later that day. She was sworn in on June 11, 2018.

On September 23, 2019, U.S. Attorney General William Barr appointed MacDonald to the Attorney General's Advisory Committee (AGAC), a body that represents the voice of the U.S. Attorneys and provides advice and counsel to the Attorney General on policy, management, and operational issues affecting U.S. Attorneys’ Offices. MacDonald also served on the AGAC subcommittees on national security, border and immigration and Native American Issues and co-chaired the AGAC Human Trafficking and Child Exploitation Working Group.

On January 22, 2020, Barr appointed MacDonald as a Commissioner on the President's Commission on Law Enforcement and the Administration of Justice. Under Executive Order 13896, President Donald Trump created the President's Commission on Law Enforcement and the Administration of Justice to study ways to prevent and deter crime.

On February 8, 2021, MacDonald was asked to resign, along with 55 other Trump-era attorneys. She resigned on February 28.
