= Anders Folk =

American attorney

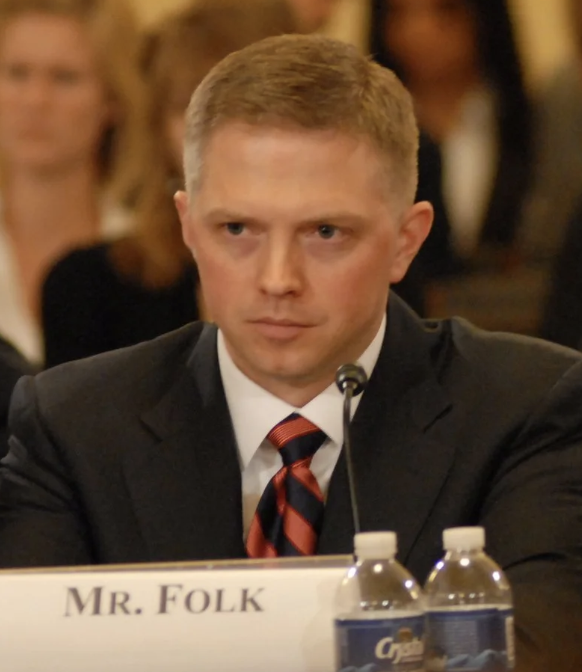
- Folk in 2026

United States Attorney for the District of Minnesota
- Acting
- In office March 1, 2021 – November 8, 2021
- President: Joe Biden
- Preceded by: Erica MacDonald
- Succeeded by: Charles J. Kovats (acting)

Personal details
- Born: November 24, 1976 (age 49) Hopkins, Minnesota, U.S.
- Party: Democratic (DFL)
- Education: University of Minnesota (BA, JD)

W. Anders Folk is an American attorney who served as Acting United States Attorney for the District of Minnesota in 2021. A native of Minnesota, he has held senior roles at the United States Department of Justice in both Minnesota and Washington D.C.

Folk was a candidate in the 2026 Hennepin County Attorney election, losing to Cedrick Frazier in the general election.

== Education and military service ==
Folk graduated from Hopkins High School and earned a Bachelor of Arts degree summa cum laude from the University of Minnesota, where he was a Phi Beta Kappa member. He earned his Juris Doctor from the University of Minnesota Law School. He served on active duty in the United States Marine Corps as a judge advocate from 2001 to 2005, prosecuting and defending service members in courts-martial, including murder and war crimes cases.

== Legal career ==
Folk first joined the United States Attorney's Office for the District of Minnesota as an Assistant United States Attorney in 2005, where he prosecuted federal crimes including terrorism, narcotics, and financial fraud. He worked on cases involving the al-Shabaab terrorist organization's recruitment of Minnesotans to fight in Somalia. In 2008, Folk was one of five individuals nationally recognized with the Younger Federal Lawyer award by the Federal Bar Association for his work as a federal prosecutor.

As an Assistant U.S. Attorney, Folk led Minnesota’s investigation into the recruitment of young Somali-American men from the Minneapolis–St. Paul area to travel to Somalia and fight for al-Shabaab, a U.S.-designated foreign terrorist organization.

On August 5, 2010, the Justice Department announced the unsealing of four indictments across three federal districts charging fourteen individuals with providing money, personnel, and services to al-Shabaab. Two of those indictments were filed in Minnesota: one charging individuals with raising and transferring funds to al-Shabaab through door-to-door solicitation and the hawala remittance system, and a third superseding indictment charging ten men with terrorism offenses for leaving the United States to join al-Shabaab. The announcement was made by Attorney General Eric Holder and FBI Director Robert S. Mueller III. DOJ identified Folk and AUSA Jeffrey S. Paulsen as the prosecutors handling the Minnesota cases, working alongside the National Security Division.

The Minnesota charges arose from what DOJ described as an ongoing two-year investigation by the FBI's Minneapolis Joint Terrorism Task Force, assisted by the Dutch national police and Ministry of Justice, the State Department, U.S. embassies in the United Arab Emirates and Yemen, and the Department of Defense. By August 2010, nineteen people had been charged in the district; nine had been arrested and five had pleaded guilty. A 2011 profile in Minnesota Lawyer reported that Folk's work with the task force and foreign governments contributed to more than twenty terrorism-related indictments, and described extensive travel to Middle Eastern and European countries in the course of the investigation.

On July 27, 2011, Folk testified before the U.S. House Committee on Homeland Security at a hearing on al-Shabaab recruitment and radicalization within the Muslim American community.

He left in 2011 to practice at Stinson LLP in Minneapolis, before returning to the U.S. Attorney's Office in 2018 as First Assistant United States Attorney.

Folk was recognized by Attorney General Eric Holder, the U.S. Attorney General during the Obama administration, for his counterterrorism work with the U.S. Attorney's Office. In 2013, he received the Attorney General’s Award for Excellence in Furthering the Interests of U.S. National Security.

As First Assistant U.S. Attorney, Folk provided keynote comments on protecting consumers along with leaders from the Minnesota Attorney General’s Office, Better Business Bureau of Minnesota and North Dakota, Mid-Minnesota Legal Aid, Federal Trade Commission, legal services attorneys and other consumer advocates. In 2019, Folk testified before a state workgroup co-chaired by Attorney General Keith Ellison offering specific recommendations for investigating and prosecuting police deadly force cases.

On March 1, 2021, Folk was designated Acting United States Attorney for the District of Minnesota following the resignation of U.S. Attorney Erica H. MacDonald at the start of the Biden administration. In that role, he filed federal civil rights charges against Derek Chauvin in connection with the murder of George Floyd, leading to the federal conviction of Chauvin and his co-defendants. He also initiated a pattern and practice investigation into the Minneapolis Police Department for alleged civil rights violations.

Under Folk's leadership, the U.S. Attorney's Office secured a guilty verdict in the trial of Ty Jindra, a former Minneapolis Police Department officer charged with three counts of acquiring a controlled substance by deception and two counts of deprivation of rights under color of law.

As First Assistant U.S. Attorney for the District of Minnesota, Folk was involved with the federal investigation and prosecution of Emily Claire Hari (formerly Michael Hari) for the August 2017 bombing of the Dar al-Farooq Islamic Center in Bloomington, Minnesota, a hate crime targeting Muslim worshippers. Hari was convicted by a federal jury in December 2020. After being elevated to Acting U.S. Attorney, Folk announced Hari's 53-year sentence in September 2021 on behalf of the office alongside community leaders.

As First Assistant U.S. Attorney and Acting U.S. Attorney, Folk led a multi-jurisdictional effort with federal, state, and local law enforcement partners to prosecute Richard Alonzo Woods and his co-conspirators for a series of violent armed robberies in the Twin Cities and surrounding communities. Woods pled guilty to one count of interference with commerce by robbery, two counts of armed bank robbery, two counts of carrying a firearm during and in relation to a crime of violence, and one count of conspiracy to commit armed robbery.

Folk played a lead role in federally prosecuting members of a violent anti-government group, the Boogaloo Bois. As First U.S. Attorney and Acting U.S. Attorney for Minnesota, Folk was involved with the investigation and prosecution of several Boogaloo Bois for conspiracy to provide material support to a foreign terrorist organization, a felony riot, and illegal possession of a machine gun. Folk led the office as it secured a guilty plea from Ivan Hunter, a self-described Boogaloo Boy from San Antonio, Texas, who traveled to Minneapolis during the civil unrest following the murder of George Floyd and fired 13 rounds from an AK-47-style rifle into the Minneapolis Police Department's Third Precinct building while individuals remained inside. In September 2021, Folk announced that Hunter had been sentenced to 51 months in federal prison.

On August 12, 2021, Folk announced federal sex trafficking charges against Anton “Tony” Lazzaro, a Minneapolis political strategist and Republican donor. The indictment charged Lazzaro with one count of conspiracy to commit sex trafficking of minors, five counts of sex trafficking of minors, one count of attempted sex trafficking of a minor, and three counts of obstruction, alleging that from May through December 2020 Lazzaro conspired with others to recruit and solicit six minor victims for commercial sex acts.

In March 2023, a federal jury found Lazzaro guilty on one count of conspiracy and five counts of sex trafficking of minors. Lazzaro was sentenced to 21 years in prison in August 2023.

Folk stepped down as Acting United States Attorney in November 2021.

Following his tenure as Acting U.S. Attorney, Folk served as Senior Counsel to Deputy Attorney General Lisa Monaco in Washington, D.C., managing a portfolio covering crisis response and civil rights.

== 2026 Hennepin County Attorney campaign ==
In October 2025, Folk announced his candidacy for Hennepin County Attorney after incumbent Mary Moriarty announced she would not seek re-election. His campaign has focused on public safety and restoring relationships with law enforcement. Following Operation Metro Surge, Folk criticized ICE's immigration enforcement tactics in Minneapolis, calling them "brutal and wanton." In February 2026, Folk signed a letter along with seven other former U.S. Attorneys condemning the "ongoing damage" to the Department of Justice under the second Trump administration.

He received endorsements from Minneapolis Mayor Jacob Frey, former U.S. Attorney Andrew Luger and former Hennepin Country Attorney candidate and neurolaw professor Francis X. Shen.

Folk was defeated by Cedrick Frazier in the general election.
