= 2014 Hennepin County Attorney election =

Local election in Minnesota

- November 4, 2014
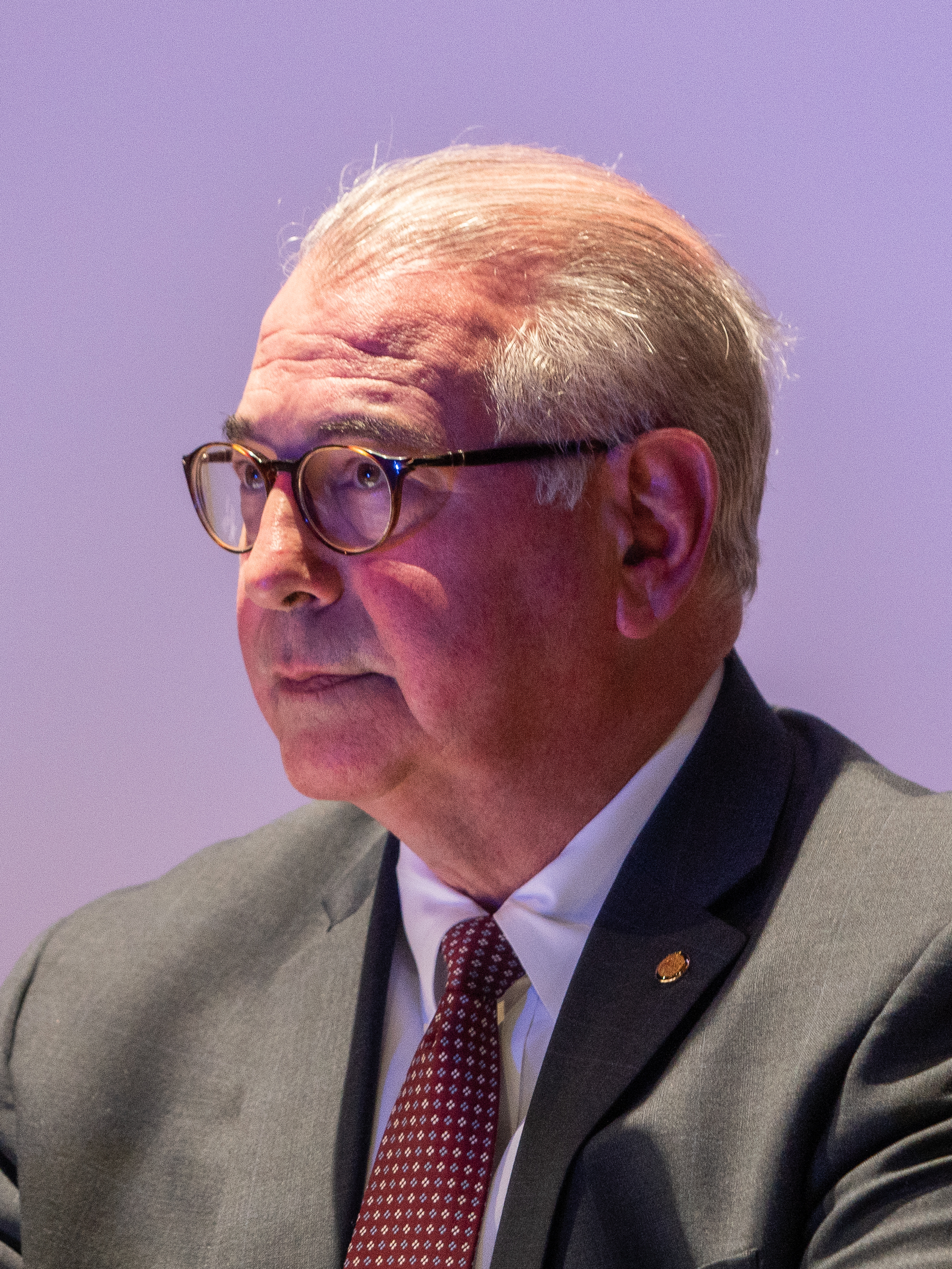
Candidate	Michael O. Freeman
Party	Nonpartisan
Popular vote	285,131
Percentage	98.34%

The 2014 Hennepin County Attorney election was held on November 4, 2014, to elect the county attorney of Hennepin County, Minnesota. Incumbent Michael O. Freeman was re-elected to his fifth term, without opposition.

Freeman ran unopposed on a platform of aggressive prosecution of gang and gun crimes, reducing exploitation of seniors, and continued dedication of resources to county departments.

== General election ==
=== Candidates ===
- Michael O. Freeman, incumbent

=== Results ===
2014 Hennepin County Attorney election
Party	Candidate	Votes	%
Nonpartisan	Michael O. Freeman	285,131	98.34
Write-in		4,813	1.66
Total votes		289,944	100.00

== See also ==
- List of County Attorneys of Hennepin County
