= 2018 Hennepin County Attorney election =

- November 6, 2018
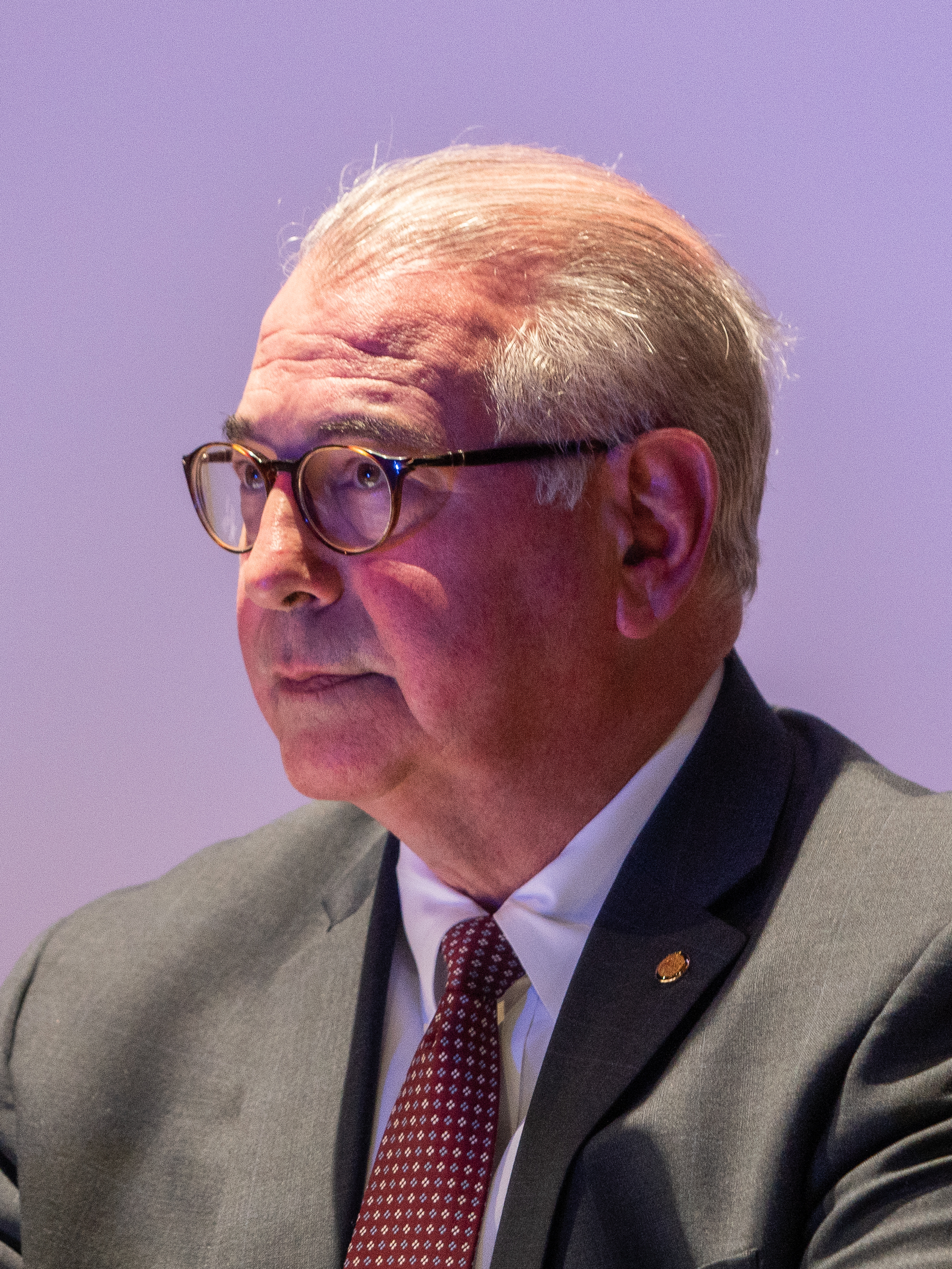

Candidate	Michael O. Freeman	Mark Haase
Party	Nonpartisan	Nonpartisan
Popular vote	273,260	229,879
Percentage	53.98%	45.41%

The 2018 Hennepin County Attorney election was held on November 6, 2018, to elect the county attorney of Hennepin County, Minnesota. Incumbent Michael O. Freeman was re-elected to his sixth term.

Both Freeman and Haase sought the DFL endorsement. Haase successfully obtained it. Haase presented himself as the progressive candidate, while Freeman was a more conservative candidate.

== General election ==
=== Candidates ===
- Mark Haase, Executive Director of the Minnesota Justice Research Center
- Michael O. Freeman, incumbent

=== Endorsements ===
Mark Haase

Organizations

- Hennepin County DFL

=== Results ===
2018 Hennepin County Attorney election
Party	Candidate	Votes	%
Nonpartisan	Michael O. Freeman	273,260	53.98
Nonpartisan	Mark Haase	229,879	45.41
Write-in		3,069	0.61
Total votes		506,208	100.00

== See also ==
- List of County Attorneys of Hennepin County
