= Daniel N. Rosen =

American lawyer

Daniel Rosen
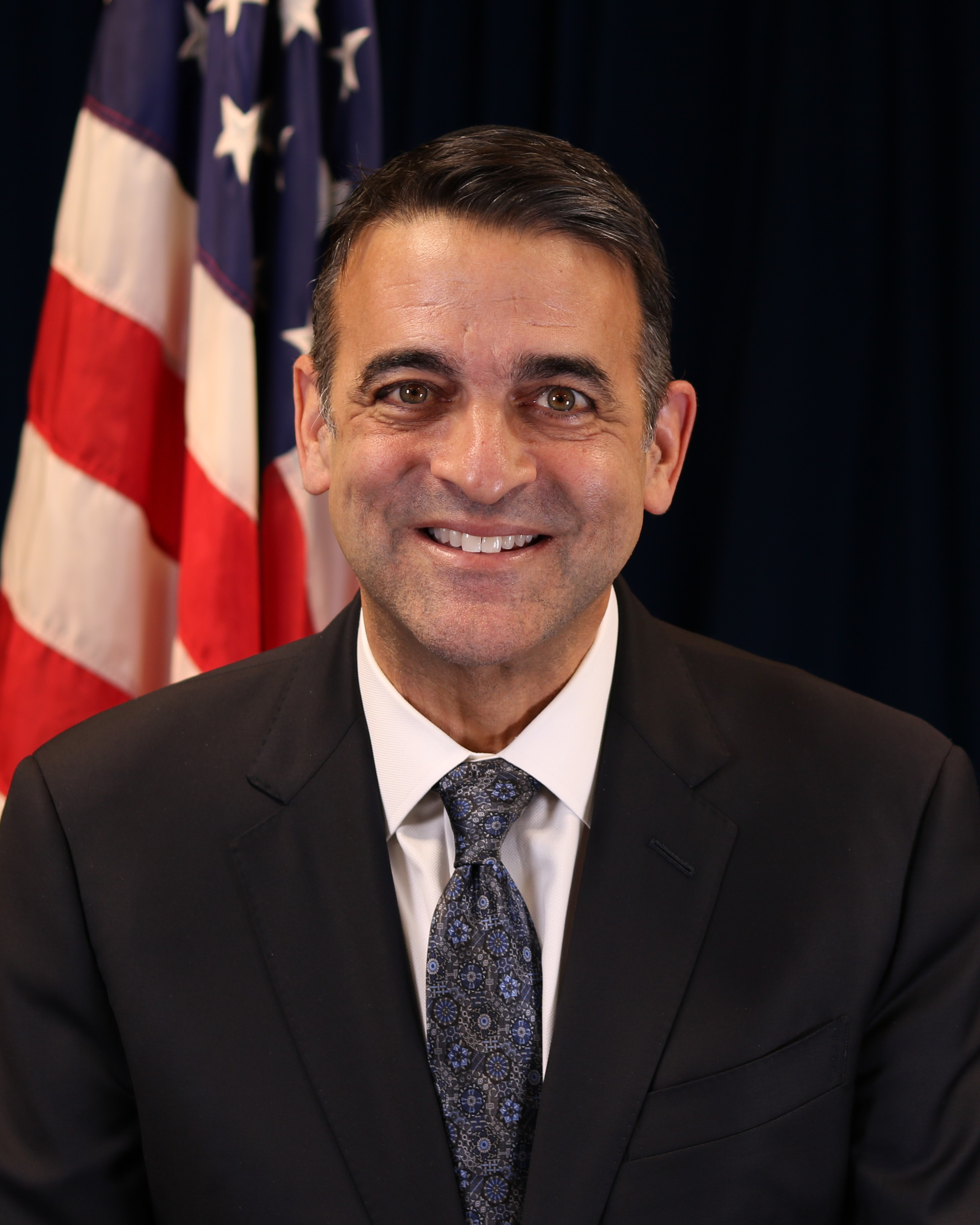
- Official portrait, 2025

United States Attorney for the District of Minnesota
- Incumbent
- Assumed office October 10, 2025
- President: Donald Trump
- Preceded by: Andrew M. Luger

Personal details
- Born: Daniel Noah Rosen; June 11, 1965 (age 61) Minnesota, U.S.
- Education: University of Wisconsin, Madison (BA); University of Minnesota (JD)

Daniel Noah Rosen (born June 11, 1965) is an American lawyer who serves as the United States Attorney for the District of Minnesota. He started his term on October 10, 2025.

== Early life and education ==
Rosen is a Minnesota native and graduated Blake School in 1983. He attended University of Wisconsin, followed by University of Minnesota School of Law. He was a naval officer during the First Gulf War.

== Career ==
His legal career was largely in civil litigation, primarily eminent domain law.

=== U.S. Attorney for the District of Minnesota ===
On May 6, 2025, Rosen was nominated by President Donald Trump to be United States Attorney for the District of Minnesota. He was confirmed by the U.S. Senate on October 7, 2025, and sworn into office on October 10, 2025.

The Minnesota office is responsible for responding to emergency lawsuits by immigrants arrested or held by the United States Immigration and Customs Enforcement (ICE). In February 2026, Rosen said the office has had to abandon other priorities due to a high number of ICE cases. Rosen asked a federal judge to drop charges against two Venezuelan nationals accused of assault on ICE officers. He said the allegations were inconsistent with the evidence. The case was thrown out with prejudice.

On January 7, 2026, Renée Good, a 37-year-old Minnesotan woman, was fatally shot by an ICE agent during a federal immigration enforcement operation in Minneapolis. Rosen sent an internal email instructing prosecutors to "say nothing" to law enforcement and the media about Good's killing, and that because of its sensitive nature, only his designees could speak to investigators. The DOJ said there was no basis for further investigation.

Criminal prosecutors expressed concern to Rosen after an initial lack of an investigation into the killing of Alex Pretti. The DOJ reversed this decision several days later.

== Personal life ==
Rosen is an Orthodox Jew.
