= Francis X. Shen =

Francis X. Shen is an American lawyer and professor whose research focuses on neurolaw. He is a professor of law at the University of Minnesota Law School and director of the Shen Neurolaw Lab.

In 2025, he declared his candidacy in the 2026 Hennepin County Attorney election. He ended his campaign in April 2026, endorsing Anders Folk.

== Early life and education ==
Shen received a Bachelor of Arts in economics and English from the University of Chicago. He earned a Juris Doctor from Harvard Law School and a Ph.D. in government and social policy from Harvard University.

== Career ==
Shen is a professor of law at the University of Minnesota Law School and a Solly Robins Distinguished Research Fellow.

He directs the Shen Neurolaw Lab, which conducts interdisciplinary research on the legal implications of neuroscience and emerging technologies.

Shen has held academic and research positions at institutions including Harvard University, Vanderbilt University, and Tulane University. He has also been affiliated with the Center for Law, Brain and Behavior at Massachusetts General Hospital and Harvard Medical School.

He has contributed to interdisciplinary initiatives such as the MacArthur Foundation Research Network on Law and Neuroscience, where he directed education and outreach activities.

Shen's scholarship examines how advances in neuroscience and artificial intelligence intersect with legal systems, particularly in areas such as criminal law, mental privacy, and evidentiary standards.

=== Awards and recognition ===
Shen received the Early Career Scholars Medal from the American Law Institute in 2021, awarded to legal scholars whose work is expected to influence the development of the law. The institute described him as "a pioneer in establishing the interdisciplinary field of law and neuroscience."

== Candidacy for Hennepin County Attorney ==
In November 2025, Shen announced he was running for Hennepin County Attorney, citing "innovation" as needed. He also cited public safety and violence as key pillars for his campaign.

In April 2026, Shen announced that he was dropping out of the race and endorsing Anders Folk.
