= Lyndon Carlson =

American politician

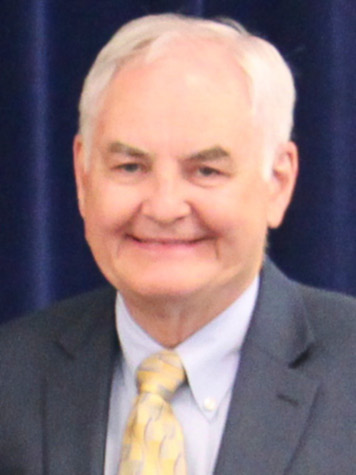

Member of the Minnesota House of Representatives
- In office January 2, 1973 – January 5, 2021
- Preceded by: redrawn district
- Succeeded by: Cedrick Frazier
- Constituency: 44A (1973–1983); 46B (1983–2003); 45B (2003–2013); 45A (2013–2021)

Personal details
- Born: April 18, 1940 (age 86) Minneapolis, Minnesota
- Party: Democratic Farmer Labor
- Spouse: Carole Moss
- Children: 3
- Education: Minnesota State University, Mankato
- Profession: educator, legislator

Lyndon R. Carlson, Sr. (born April 18, 1940) is a retired American politician who served in the Minnesota House of Representatives from 1973 until 2021. A member of the Minnesota Democratic–Farmer–Labor Party (DFL), Carlson represented District 45A, which included portions of Hennepin County including the city of Crystal in the Twin Cities metropolitan area.

Carlson is the longest-serving member of both the Minnesota House and the Minnesota Legislature, serving 24 terms in the House. He ended his legislative career with a perfect attendance record, never missing a legislative day.

== Early life, education, and career ==
Carlson was born in Minneapolis and graduated from Bloomington High School in 1958. In 1964 he graduated from Minnesota State University, Mankato, then named Mankato State College, with a B.S. in education and social studies. He also attended graduate school there and at St. Thomas College in Saint Paul.

Carlson taught social studies and coached at Camden High School, then Patrick Henry High School, in Minneapolis for many years. He lived in Brooklyn Center at the time of his first election to the Minnesota House.

== Minnesota House of Representatives ==
Carlson was elected to the Minnesota House of Representatives in 1972 and was reelected every two years until his retirement in 2021. He was first elected on a nonpartisan ballot. After a change in the law in 1974, he ran as a member of the Democratic-Farmer-Labor (DFL) party. He later said he supported party labels: "If the voter goes in and they know which candidate is a Democrat and which one is a Republican … it provides more openness in government".

Carlson chaired the Ways and Means Committee under Speaker Paul Thissen during the 88th Minnesota Legislature from 2013 to 2014, after the DFL won a "trifecta" of the House, Senate, and governorship in the 2012 election. Incoming speaker Melissa Hortman appointed Carlson to chair the Ways and Means Committee again in the 91st Minnesota Legislature from 2019 to 2020 after the DFL retook control of the House in the 2018 election.

Carlson chaired the Finance Committee from 2007 to 2010, served as assistant minority leader for the DFL caucus from 1999 to 2002, and chaired the Education Committee from 1981 to 1984 and from 1987 to 1997.

In December 2019, Carlson announced he would retire from the Minnesota House at the end of his term after serving 24 terms and becoming the longest-serving legislator in state history. Reflecting on his career, he said, "I have played a role in many of the key issues in health care and prescription drugs, the environment, jobs and economic development, transportation, and education at all levels".

== Personal life ==
Carlson married Carole Moss on December 7, 1968. They have three children. He was a member of Cross of Glory Lutheran Church in the 1970s and early 1980s.
