= Jamie Long =

American politician (born 1981)

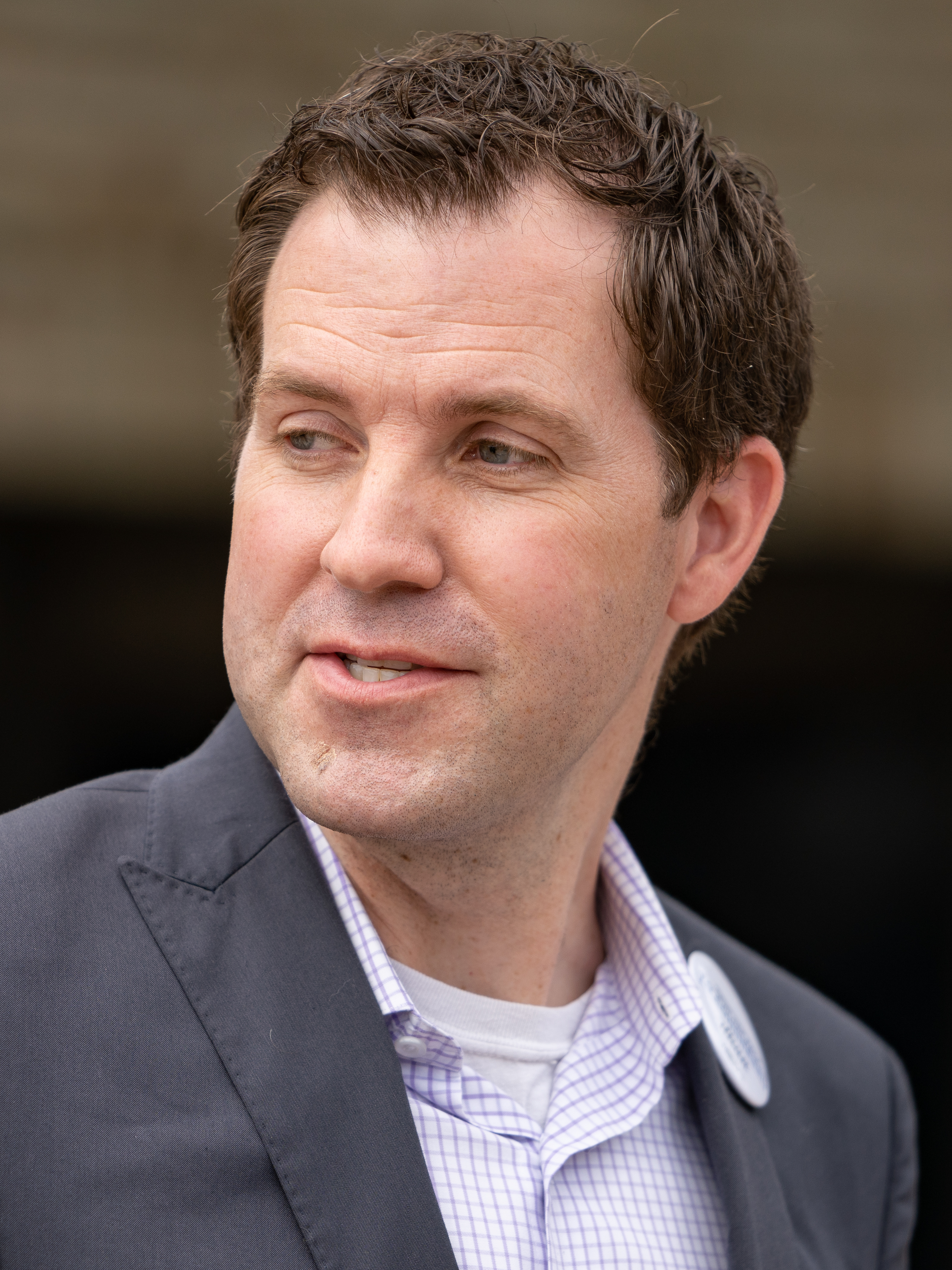
- Long in 2020

Majority Leader of the Minnesota House of Representatives
- In office January 3, 2023 – January 14, 2025
- Preceded by: Ryan Winkler
- Succeeded by: Harry Niska

Member of the Minnesota House of Representatives from the 61B district
- Incumbent
- Assumed office January 8, 2019
- Preceded by: Paul Thissen

Personal details
- Born: December 19, 1981 (age 44)
- Party: Democratic
- Spouse: Melissa
- Children: 2
- Education: Carleton College (BA); George Washington University (JD)
- Website: State House website Campaign website

Jamie Long (born December 19, 1981) is an American politician serving in the Minnesota House of Representatives since 2019. A member of the Minnesota Democratic–Farmer–Labor Party (DFL), Long represents District 61B, which includes parts of southern Minneapolis in Hennepin County, Minnesota.

From 2023 to 2025, Long served as the Majority Leader of the Minnesota House of Representatives.

== Early life, education, and career ==
Long attended Carleton College, graduating with a Bachelor of Arts in political science in 2004, and George Washington University, graduating with a Juris Doctor in 2007.

Long has worked as an environmental attorney, an energy and transportation aide in the United States Congress and worked for Sheldon Whitehouse and Diana DeGette.

Long previously worked as former U.S. Representative Keith Ellison's deputy chief of staff and legislative director. He managed Ellison's 2017 campaign for Democratic National Committee chair. He was chair of the Linden Hills Neighborhood Council and a board member of Minneapolis Climate Action.

== Minnesota House of Representatives ==
Long was elected to the Minnesota House of Representatives in 2018 and has been reelected every two years since. He first ran after eight-term incumbent Paul Thissen announced he would not seek reelection in order to run for governor of Minnesota.

From 2021 to 2022, Long chaired the Climate and Energy Finance and Policy Committee. He served as an assistant majority leader of the House DFL caucus and as vice chair of the Energy and Climate Finance and Policy Committee from 2019 to 2020.

After the 2022 election, Long was elected to serve as majority leader of the Minnesota House of Representatives, succeeding Ryan Winkler, who did not seek reelection. He chairs the Rules and Legislative Administration Committee. Long was mentioned as a potential candidate for majority leader after the 2018 election.

As majority leader, Long has listed investments in affordable housing, child care, and climate change among his caucus's top priorities for the 2023 legislative session. He spoke in support of high-profile bills to protect abortion rights, provide driver's licenses to undocumented residents, make Minnesota a refuge state for transgender people, and provide funding to the attorney general to hire more prosecutors. He said he was concerned about proposals to eliminate the Social Security tax for "very wealthy" Minnesotans.

=== Climate and energy ===
Long has supported efforts to cut greenhouse gas emissions by decreasing reliance on coal plants and investing in solar panels, wind energy, and electric vehicles. He has also called for addressing emissions in the transportation and agriculture sectors, and called for more investment in weatherization, energy capacity and electric infrastructure. He has also supported legislation to help low-income, residential customers participate in solar programs and programs to place solar panels on public schools. He pushed legislation that would allow cities to move faster on updating building energy codes.

Long has opposed deregulation of the energy market, and said it is a "false choice" to say Minnesota needs to mine for copper to combat climate change. He criticized House Republicans in 2019 for voting against an amendment declaring that human activity is a key cause of climate change and said Senate Republicans refused to support the green energy job sector. He called the session's final compromise climate legislation "definitely a disappointing outcome for the climate and moving clean energy forward".

In 2021, Long authored the Energy Conservation and Optimization Act, which included an expansion of the state's energy conservation program, particularly to low-income households, and made it easier for gas utilities to use "renewable" natural gas and carbon-free hydrogen. Long called the bill "the biggest piece of energy legislation we have passed in several years".

==== 100 percent clean energy goal ====
In 2019, Long authored legislation to set a 100 percent clean energy goal by 2050, saying "the crisis is urgent". Governor Tim Walz supported the legislation. The bill would require electric utility companies to meet deadlines to reduce their use of fossil fuels. The bill passed the House, but did not advance in the Republican-controlled Senate.

Long introduced the proposal again in 2021, this time moving the goal up to 2040. He said that the new goals, which would be among the nation's most ambitious, were updated "because we've seen that we're failing to meet our greenhouse gas goals".

In 2023, Long said the "100 percent by 2040" bill would be a caucus priority for DFLers. The bill would include energy sources that do not emit carbon, such as nuclear, hydroelectric, wind, and solar. The bill passed the Minnesota House on January 26, 2023, and was signed by Walz on February 7.

==== Electric vehicles ====
Long has supported Walz's efforts to use his rule-making authority to adopt stricter car emission standards, and pushed for a state rebate program for electric vehicle purchases. He has not supported efforts to fully ban the sale of gas cars, instead calling for more incentives to spur the adoption of EVs. He has authored bills to require EV-ready spaces in or next to new commercial and multifamily structures. Long supported legislation to provide matching funds for electric vehicle infrastructure provided by President Joe Biden's Infrastructure Investment and Jobs Act (IIJA).

=== Public safety and criminal justice reform ===
Long founded a bipartisan Criminal Justice Reform Caucus in the Minnesota legislature, and pushed for automatic expungement of certain low-level crimes. He supported Governor Walz's criminal justice reform proposals, and wrote a bill to create a clemency review commission staffed by appointees from the governor, attorney general, and chief justice of the Minnesota Supreme Court, and replace the requirement for a unanimous vote for a two-thirds majority.

Long supported requiring judges to issue "sign and release" warrants instead of arrest warrants for certain offenses after the police shooting of Daunte Wright. He authored a bill to limit the use of shackling children in court, and a law that would reform the use of jail informants. Long wrote legislation that would allow candidates for office to shield their home addresses due to safety concerns from protests at the homes of legislators.

Long led a criminal justice reform roundtable for 2020 Democratic Party presidential primary candidate Elizabeth Warren, and praised her policies on use-of-force standards and plan to end private prisons.

==== Probation terms ====
Long wrote a bill that would limit probation terms to five years, and legislation requiring the Minnesota Sentencing Guidelines Commission to establish recommended probation guidelines. He has said, "lengthy probation terms don't have any real relation to our goals of rehabilitation, fairness, and just punishment". He has spoken out about the need to reduce probation terms to help promote rehabilitation and reintegration.

==== Police PTSD claims ====
Long authored legislation that would mandate PTSD training for public safety workers and change the process for police receiving state duty disability benefits. The bipartisan proposal would require treatment from medical professionals and officers to seek workers' compensation before being put on permanent disability under the pension system. Long has spoken out about the number of Minneapolis police officers seeking disability benefits, saying it could lead to some avoiding the normal disciplinary process.

=== Election policy ===
Long has called for legislation to open access to presidential primary ballots, allowing candidates to be listed if they file an affidavit and pay a fee. The proposal would revert to the process the state used before its 1992 switch to a caucus system. In 2021 and 2022, he authored a bill to give Minnesota's major political parties more control over candidates running under the party banner by establishing a court process to prevent imposter candidates.

Long supported legislation to make voting easier and safer during the COVID-19 pandemic, arguing for expanding voting by mail and placing ballot drop boxes outside government polling places.

=== Other political positions ===
Long supports moving Minnesota from a part-time to a full-time legislature, saying the change would get rid of the need for last-minute special sessions, lessen the need for massive omnibus bills, and lead to more bipartisan discussion and agreement. He authored a bill that would put the measure on the ballot for voters to decide.

Long sponsored legislation in 2023 to expand MinnesotaCare, the state's healthcare program for low-income Minnesotans, saying it would help small business owners, self-employed workers, and undocumented immigrants. His bill would allow all Minnesotans to buy in to MinnesotaCare.

Long co-authored legislation to increase funding for efforts to ensure every Minnesotan was counted in the 2020 census. He supported efforts to rename Lake Calhoun in his district, named after John C. Calhoun, to its Dakota name, Bde Maka Ska. Long wrote a bill to create uniform state rules for how cities can create municipal identification cards. He spoke out about the lack of childcare options near the state capitol and the difficulty of being a new parent in the legislature.

=== University of Minnesota fellowship position ===
In July 2019, Long accepted a $50,000 paid research fellowship at the University of Minnesota's Institute on the Environment's Energy Transition Lab. Internal documents showed he had exchanged emails with the lab's head, Ellen Anderson, who was also a former DFL state senator, about creating the position months before it was publicly posted. Anderson emailed Long when the position was posted, and was issued a warning from the Human Resources Department not to rush the process. Long accepted the job five days later.

The documents were requested by Republican state representative Chris Swedzinski, who sent a letter to House Speaker Melissa Hortman saying "there is no question that Rep. Long would not have been hired but for his position as a lawmaker". Swedzinski called for an investigation into the process and for Hortman to strip Long of his leadership and committee vice chair position until an ethics investigation was completed. Long called the allegations "politically motivated" but resigned from the job in September 2019.

Hortman said she would review the allegations, requesting the documents related to Long's hiring at the university. She also disclosed that she had previously been employed by the university, and taught classes alongside Anderson, and asked for House nonpartisan research to retain outside counsel to look into the matter.

An independent investigation by law firm Ballard Spahr concluded that Long's conduct was "consistent with state laws and rules governing legislator conflicts of interest and lobbying activity". Hortman said the report "completely exonerates Representative Long from all allegations of impropriety". The incident led to calls for tougher conflict-of interest rules for the state legislature.

== Electoral history ==
2018 Minnesota State House - District 61B
Party	Candidate	Votes	%
Democratic (DFL)	Jamie Long	21,289	85.73
Republican	Scot D. Missling	3,487	14.04
Write-in		57	0.23
Total votes		24,833	100.0
Democratic (DFL) hold			

2020 Minnesota State House - District 61B
Party	Candidate	Votes	%
Democratic (DFL)	Jamie Long (incumbent)	22,789	83.97
Republican	Lisa Pohlman	4,329	15.95
Write-in		20	0.07
Total votes		27,138	100.0
Democratic (DFL) hold			

2022 Minnesota State House - District 61B
Party	Candidate	Votes	%
Democratic (DFL)	Jamie Long (incumbent)	21,030	98.89
Write-in		236	1.11
Total votes		21,266	100.0
Democratic (DFL) hold			

2024 Minnesota State House - District 61B
Party	Candidate	Votes	%
Democratic (DFL)	Jamie Long (incumbent)	23,864	89.09
Republican	Bob "Again" Carney Jr	2,861	10.68
Write-in		61	0.23
Total votes		26,786	100.0
Democratic (DFL) hold			

== Personal life ==
Long and his wife, Melissa, have two children. He resides in Minneapolis's Armatage neighborhood.

Minnesota House of Representatives
Preceded by Ryan Winkler	Majority Leader of the Minnesota House of Representatives; 2023–2025	Succeeded by Harry Niska
