= Weldon Angelos case =

Marijuana court case

Weldon Angelos is a music producer who was sentenced in a high profile marijuana case involving mandatory minimum sentences that was presented to the United States Supreme Court. The United States Supreme Court declined to hear the case but Angelos was later released from prison 13 years later due to public pressure from celebrities, United States Senators, the judge that sentenced him, and ultimately the prosecutor who prosecuted him.

== Background ==
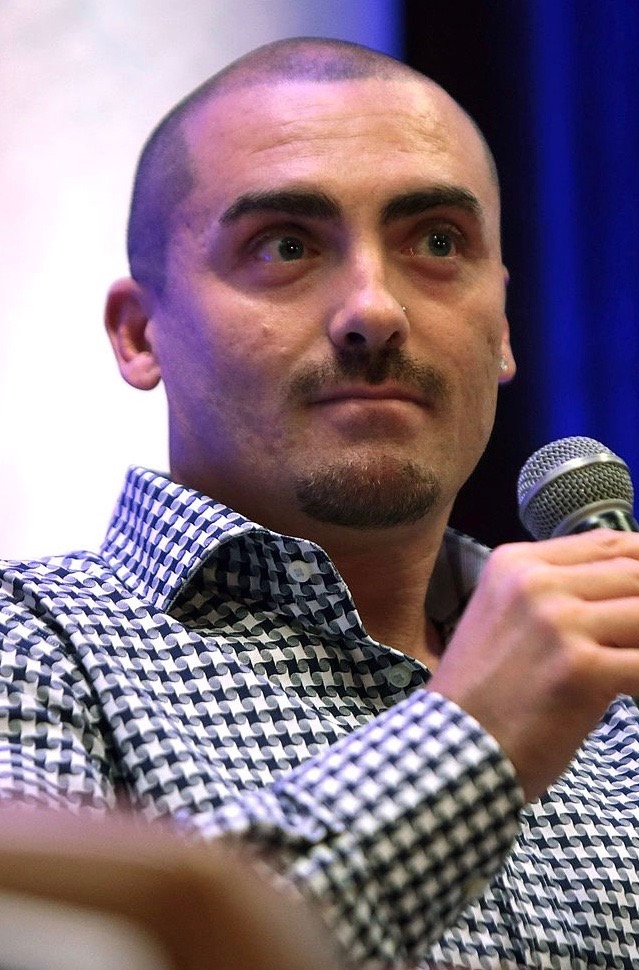
Angelos in 2016

The son of an immigrant, Weldon Angelos worked as a music producer with musicians such as Snoop Dogg and Tupac Shakur, and was accused of selling marijuana to a police informant on several occasions worth a total of $350. The witness stated that Angelos had a firearm strapped to his ankle, but no photographs or evidence existed other than his testimony, and Angelos never used or brandished a firearm during the sales.

However, Title 18, Section 924(c) of the federal code provides for mandatory sentences for dealers who carry firearms during their drug transactions; meaning Angelos, who had no prior criminal record, was sentenced in November 2004 to 55 years in prison.

== Trial and conviction ==
The judge in the case, Paul Cassell (of the U.S. Court for the District of Utah) who sentenced Angelos to 55 years, said that due to mandatory minimum sentencing guidelines, he had no choice but to impose it. Cassell urged President Bush to commute the sentence, calling it "unjust, cruel, and irrational", noting the sentence is much more than the minimum for hijacking, kidnapping, or rape. On appeal the United States Court of Appeals for the Tenth Circuit upheld the sentence. The U.S. Supreme Court declined to hear Angelos' petition.

Weldon Angelos had a projected release date of 18 November 2051. For those convicted since 1 November 1987, there is no federal parole in the United States.

On 29 April 2009, a federal judge denied a request by Angelos for a new trial by rejecting a claim that his trial attorney mishandled plea negotiations with the federal prosecutor, U.S. District Judge Tena Campbell ruled that attorney Jerome Mooney had provided Angelos with "competent and thorough" legal help. This was one of the last appeals Angelos could launch, which made it likely his sentence was final.

The Constitution Project wrote a letter, signed by 113 celebrities, advocates, former judges and prosecutors, and business leaders, to Obama urging him to commute Angelos' sentence.

== Justification ==
In a radio program the prosecutor Robert Lund justified his decision to charge Angelos with a felony carrying a minimum sentence of 55 years for his first marijuana offense on the following grounds:

- Weldon Angelos was suspected of gang involvement.
- Weldon Angelos had purchased a Lexus car for $30,000.
- Weldon Angelos had not accepted a 15-year plea bargain.
- Weldon Angelos' girlfriend's house held a duffel bag with "cannabis shakings", and the duffel bag would be large enough for two people to crawl into.

The same prosecutor later worked to secure Weldon's release from prison.

== 924(c) stacking ==
The case is an example of what is technically known as 924(c) stacking. In many such cases the jury decides a gun may have been present beyond an acceptable probability of reasonable doubt appropriate for a commensurate sentence, rather than a sentence commensurate with a violent crime. For example, in a similar case, Michael Prikakis, like Angelos, was induced by a paid informant to make three drug sales. It was asserted that a gun was present, this was denied by Prikakis, and the jury decided a gun was present beyond reasonable doubt. It is known in that case that the judge's instructions to the jury did not apprise them to use a standard of reasonable doubt appropriate for a stacked sentence. The judge Vinson later wrote that the jury would have been shocked to learn of the stacked sentence: "I think they would rise up in indignation, as anybody else would, if they know about how this law is being applied and construed in circumstances such as this, which is essentially one underlying offense." Judge Vinson also noted that in such cases the prosecutor can choose the length of the sentence by choosing what number of controlled buys to solicit prior to the arrest of the defendant. Articles also note that prosecutors can solicit controlled buys from an essentially innocent defendant known to carry a gun, thereby inducing a previously innocent person to commit transactions leading to life imprisonment.

Proponents argue that 924(c) stacking effectively punishes recidivist offenders and removes them from society. On the other hand, J. Shulhofer wrote that although 924(c) stacking was intended to be applied to repeat offenders, in practice prosecutors actually apply it "on first offenders in borderline situations who may have plausible defenses and are more likely to insist upon trial."

== Release ==
December 2020 pardon granted by Donald Trump

On 31 May 2016, after serving 13 years in prison, Angelos was released from prison thanks to a bipartisan campaign to secure his release, which included advocacy from celebrities such as Alicia Keys and Snoop Dogg, and political figures like Charles Koch and Senator Mike Lee (R-UT). The reasons for the court's reduction of Angelos' sentence remained unclear, as the records had been sealed. The Washington Post quoted Angelos' attorney, Mark Osler, explaining "After three and half years of inaction on Weldon's clemency petition, he is free because of the fair and good action of a prosecutor. He returns to citizenship because of the actions of one individual."

Young Americans for Liberty featured him in their "Incarceration Nation" activism project, and he spoke at YALCON 2016.

In December 2020, President Donald Trump issued a full pardon to Angelos.
