= Harry Niska =

American politician

Majority Leader of the Minnesota House of Representatives
- In office February 6, 2025 – March 17, 2025
- Preceded by: Jamie Long
- Succeeded by: Vacant

Member of the Minnesota House of Representatives from the 31A district
- Incumbent
- Assumed office January 3, 2023
- Preceded by: Cal Bahr

Personal details
- Party: Republican
- Spouse: Jennifer
- Children: 3
- Education: Concordia College (BA); University of Minnesota (JD)
- Website: State House website Campaign website

Harry Niska is an American politician serving in the Minnesota House of Representatives since 2023. A member of the Republican Party of Minnesota, Niska represents District 31A in the north Twin Cities metropolitan area, which includes the cities of Ramsey and Andover in Anoka County, Minnesota.

== Early life, education and career ==
=== Birth and education ===
Niska grew up in Andover, Minnesota, and graduated from Anoka High School. He received his bachelor's degree in political science from Concordia College, Moorhead, and his Juris Doctor degree from the University of Minnesota Law School.

=== Legal experience ===
Niska worked as a law clerk on the 8th Circuit Court of Appeals for Judge Roger Leland Wollman from 2005 to 2006, and for Judge David Stras in 2018. He also served on the Ramsey County Charter Commission. He worked at law firm Ross & Orenstein, and unsuccessfully ran for a seat on the Ramsey City Council in 2010.

In 2015, Niska brought a complaint against a Republican activist who he claimed misled voters by making false claims of endorsement in a judicial race for the Minnesota Supreme Court. The claim was upheld and the activist was fined $600. Niska said, "fraud, meaning lies that are actually meant to induce people to do something, are not protected by the First Amendment in the same way [as] even innocent or even white lies".

=== 2016 Trump presidential candidacy ===
In 2016, Niska opposed Donald Trump in the Republican primary, saying he "did everything I knew to prevent the party from making what I think is a historic mistake". He signed up to volunteer for independent presidential candidate Evan McMullin, saying that he believed that Trump had "abused every lever of power that’s been available to him".

=== 2018 attorney general campaign ===
Niska ran in the Republican primary for Attorney General of Minnesota in 2018, saying he would focus on consumer protection and criticizing incumbent Lori Swanson for signing onto a lawsuit challenging Trump's travel ban from some Muslim-majority countries. In 2012, Niska urged the Minnesota attorney general to join a lawsuit challenging the Affordable Care Act. He withdrew from the primary in November 2017, citing family considerations.

== Minnesota House of Representatives ==
Niska was elected to the Minnesota House of Representatives in 2022. He first ran after legislative redistricting and after three-term Republican incumbent Cal Bahr announced he would not seek reelection and would run for a seat in the Minnesota Senate.

Niska serves on the Commerce Finance and Policy and the Judiciary Finance and Civil Law Committees.

In 2025, the House Republican caucus appointed Niska House Majority Leader, although control of the House and its leadership is in dispute, as its DFL members boycotted the opening session and have argued that the House did not have a quorum to conduct business.

Niska was elected by his Republican colleagues to serve as House Minority Leader for the 2027-2028 legislative session.

=== Political positions ===
Niska has said that many laws the DFL majority passed in 2023 are unconstitutional, resulting in multiple legal challenges. He opposed legislation that prohibited post-secondary institutions participating in PSEO from requiring faith statements, saying it infringed on religious liberties.

In 2023, he introduced legislation to address water contamination issues in the city of Andover and a bill that would prevent nonprofits from paying people's bail. Niska supported legislation that would repeal fees for those seeking copies of civil and criminal court documents.

==== Abortion ====
Niska is anti-abortion, and called DFL abortion-rights legislation passed in 2023 "the most extreme abortion policy possible".

==== Voting rights ====
Niska opposed legislation restoring voting rights to felons on parole, saying voting was a sacred right that should be taken away if people violate certain laws. He has long supported requiring voters to present a valid government-issued photo ID when voting.

==== LGTBQ+ legislation ====
Niska opposed legislation banning the practice of conversion therapy, saying there were "free speech violations" in the bill. He proposed removing sections of the bill that categorize advertising for the procedure's efficacy or "representing homosexuality as a mental disease, disorder, or illness", as consumer fraud.

Niska criticized a bill that both removed language within state law associating sexual orientation with pedophilia and also added gender identity as a protected class in Minnesota's human rights statute. He said some may now "interpret the HRA to deem pedophilia as a protected class in Minnesota"; legal experts dismissed this because pedophilia is already against Minnesota law.

== Electoral history ==
2022 Minnesota State House - District 31A
Party	Candidate	Votes	%
Republican	Harry Niska	11,638	59.51
Democratic (DFL)	Betsy O'Berry	7,904	40.42
Write-in		15	0.08
Total votes		19,557	100.0
Republican hold			

2024 Minnesota State House - District 31A
Party	Candidate	Votes	%
Republican	Harry Niska	15,461	61.11
Democratic (DFL)	Dara Grimmer	9,802	38.74
Write-in		39	0.15
Total votes		25,302	100.0
Republican hold			

== Personal life ==
Niska lives in Ramsey, Minnesota with his wife, Jen, and has three children.

Minnesota House of Representatives
Preceded by Jamie Long	Majority Leader of the Minnesota House of Representatives; 2025–present	Incumbent
