= Mark Osler =

American legal scholar

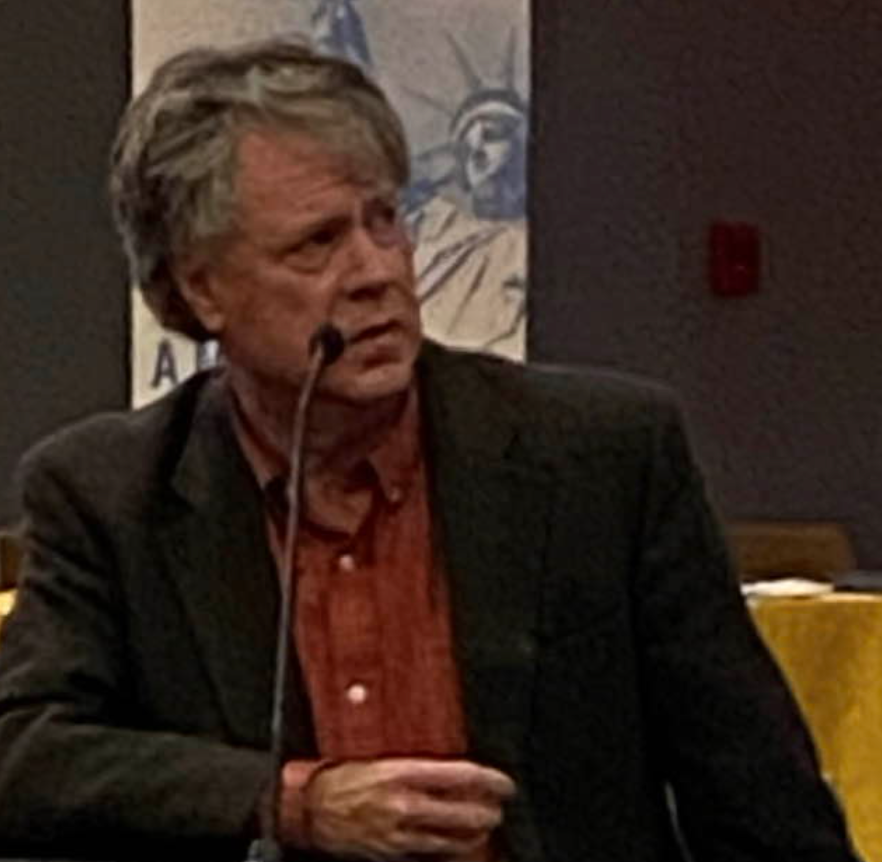
- Born: 1963 (age 62–63)
- Occupations: Scholar, lawyer, professor, author
- Known for: Jesus on Death Row

Mark William Osler (born 1963) is an American legal scholar and a former state and federal prosecutor. Osler currently serves as a law professor at the University of St. Thomas School of Law in Minneapolis, Minnesota, holding the Robert and Marion Short Distinguished Chair in Law. He began work as a law professor at Baylor University in 2000 before leaving for St. Thomas in 2010. At St. Thomas, he founded the nation's first law school clinic on federal commutations, and he has advocated for an expansive use of the presidential pardon power. His work has been profiled by The American Prospect, Rolling Stone, CBS News and The New Yorker.

== Background, education and early career ==
Born in Detroit, Michigan, Osler's family later moved to Grosse Pointe Shores, Michigan. He attended Grosse Pointe North High School, where he worked on the school newspaper with future AP White House reporter Ron Fournier. He subsequently matriculated at the College of William & Mary, graduating in 1985. Osler received his J.D. from Yale Law School in 1990 and clerked for District Court Judge Jan E. DuBois for the United States District Court for the Eastern District of Pennsylvania before returning to Detroit. There, he worked from 1992-1995 for the law firm of Dykema Gossett, and then as an Assistant United States Attorney from 1995-2000.

== Baylor Law School (2000-2010) ==
Osler's scholarship and advocacy at Baylor focused on capital punishment and narcotics policy. Some of Osler's work addressed sentencing issues involving crack cocaine. In 2009, Osler won the case (through a 6-3 summary and per curiam decision) of Spears v. United States in the United States Supreme Court, which reversed the Eighth Circuit and clarified a prior sentencing decision, declaring that sentencing judges could "categorically" reject the 100-to-1 ration between powder and crack cocaine which was then embedded in the federal sentencing guidelines. The character of "Professor Joe Fisher" in the film American Violet is based on Osler's work with the ACLU and former student David Moore in confronting unjust crack prosecutions in the city of Hearne, Texas. While at Baylor, Osler published Jesus on Death Row (Abingdon, 2009), which critiques capital punishment in the United States through an examination of the biblical account of Jesus Christ's trial and execution.

Osler was named the 2009 Wacoan of the Year.

== University of St. Thomas School of Law (2010-present) ==
Moving to St. Thomas in Minneapolis, Minnesota, Osler's work moved increasingly toward clemency. He was chosen as "Professor of the Year" in 2016, 2019, and 2022.

Following up on Jesus on Death Row, between 2011 and 2014, Osler and collaborators produced a dramatic "Sentencing of Jesus" in eleven states: Texas, Colorado, California, Oklahoma, Tennessee, Massachusetts, Illinois, Virginia, Louisiana, Arizona, and Minnesota. His 2016 book, Prosecuting Jesus recounts that project. From 2013 to 2025, Osler served as the Ruthie Mattox Chair of Preaching at First Covenant Church in Minneapolis.

Osler's most recent work has focused on clemency and narcotics policy. His opinion pieces (some co-authored) appeared in The New York Times in 2014, 2016, 2021, and 2024, and in the Washington Post in 2014, 2018, August, 2020, and November, 2020, while his arguments in favor of narcotics policy reform appeared in law journals at Harvard, Stanford, Georgetown, Rutgers, and DePaul. An article Osler co-authored with Rachel Barkow for the University of Chicago Law Review was highlighted in a lead editorial in The New York Times, in which the Times' editorial board expressly embraced Barkow and Osler's argument for clemency reform. In 2020, the Times again described the Barkow/Osler plan in a staff editorial. He and Barkow also co-founded the Clemency Resource Center at NYU, a pop-up law firm which hired and trained lawyers for a one-year stint representing clemency petitioners during the heart of the Obama Clemency Initiative.

In 2020, 2022 and 2023, Osler testified before subcommittees of the United States House Judiciary Committee on various aspects of clemency.

He has also commented on the death penalty and other issues for CNN, MSNBC, NPR, ESPN, and the Huffington Post. Osler appeared as a critic of narcotics policy in the 2013 National Geographic series "The 80's," and as a commentator in the 2014 National Geographic series "The Jesus Mysteries." He is a founding member of Law Enforcement Leaders to Reduce Crime and Incarceration, a national group of former and current prosecutors and police chiefs.

Osler was also the lawyer for Weldon Angelos, who was freed in 2016 after serving 12 years of a 55-year sentence on a marijuana and gun possession conviction. His criminal law casebook, Contemporary Criminal Law (West) was published in 2018, with a second edition released in 2021.

In 2023, Osler was part of a coalition seeking clemency reform in Minnesota based on his proposed structure in 2019. Their effort was successful. Among other reforms, the required vote for approval of a clemency petition went from 3-0 to 2-1 with the governor in the majority.

In August 2023, Osler began a leave of absence from St. Thomas to serve as Deputy Hennepin County Attorney and Director of the Criminal Division under Mary Moriarty. He returned to St. Thomas in July 2024. In August 2024, Osler promoted Minnesota Governor Tim Walz as a potential running mate for presumptive Democratic presidential candidate Kamala Harris.

A New York Times opinion article by Osler and Rachel Barkow set out a clemency agenda for the end of President Joe Biden's term in September 2024. Biden later accomplished two of the projects they urged: commutations for 1499 people out on home confinement under the CARES Act and a controversial commutation to life without parole for 37 death row inmates.
