= Cedrick Frazier =

American politician

- Frazier in 2020

Hennepin County Attorney-elect
- Assuming office January 4, 2027
- Succeeding: Mary Moriarty

Member of the Minnesota House of Representatives from the 43A district
- Incumbent
- Assumed office January 5, 2021
- Preceded by: Lyndon Carlson

Personal details
- Born: Cedrick Rommel Frazier; April 28, 1979 (age 47) Chicago, Illinois, U.S.
- Party: Democratic (DFL)
- Spouse: Stella
- Children: 3
- Education: University of Minnesota Morris (BA); Minnesota State University, Mankato (MA); William Mitchell College of Law (JD)
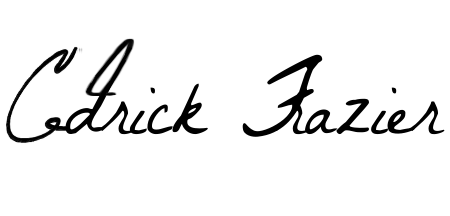
- Signature
- Website: State House website Campaign website

Cedrick Rommel Frazier (born April 28, 1979) is an American attorney and politician who is the County Attorney-elect of Hennepin County, Minnesota. A member of the Minnesota Democratic–Farmer–Labor Party (DFL), Frazier has served in the Minnesota House of Representatives since 2021.

== Early life, education, and career ==
After graduating from high school in Chicago, Illinois, Frazier moved to Minnesota to play NCAA football and run track at the University of Minnesota-Morris, graduating with a B.A. in psychology. Frazier went on to attend Minnesota State University, Mankato, where he served as a fellow with the United States Department of Housing and Urban Development, graduating with a M.A. in urban studies with an emphasis in local government management. After earning his M.A., Frazier enrolled at William Mitchell College of Law. In law school, Frazier joined Phi Beta Sigma and clerked for the Hennepin County Public Defender's Office in Minneapolis as well as the League of Minnesota Cities in its Municipal Law Litigation Department.

After graduating with a J.D and passing the bar exam, he began his legal career as a public defender in Hennepin County. In 2008, Frazier accepted the position of Director of Equity and Diversity for the Minneapolis Public School District and was later promoted to legal counsel for the district. After spending eight years in public education, Frazier joined the legal team at Education Minnesota, the state's largest labor union.

== New Hope City Council ==
In August 2018, Frazier was appointed to the New Hope City Council, replacing Erik Lammle, who moved out of New Hope. Before his appointment, Frazier served on the city's Planning Commission. Frazier was sworn in on September 10, 2018, and became the first African American to serve on the New Hope City Council.

While a member of the council, Frazier encouraged engagement and dialogue between the city's Human Rights Commission and police department on policing practices. He also proposed ordinances related to protecting tenants of affordable housing units.

== Minnesota House of Representatives ==
Frazier was first elected to the Minnesota House of Representatives in 2020, succeeding longtime Minnesota State Representative Lyndon Carlson.

=== Tenure ===
On January 1, 2021, Minnesota House Speaker Melissa Hortman appointed Frazier vice chair of the House Public Safety Committee.

Frazier advocated for reform in Minnesota's public safety and criminal justice system. Minnesota had recently seen notable cases where Black men, including George Floyd and Daunte Wright, were killed during encounters with law enforcement. Frazier was described as a key budget negotiator in the politically divided legislature as it passed a $52 billion state budget, averting a potential state government shutdown. Minnesota Governor Tim Walz credited him with helping keep police reform front and center during the legislative session.

On July 13, 2021, Hortman appointed Frazier to serve on a select panel to determine the distribution of $250 million included in the Minnesota state budget dedicated to frontline workers. The funding was made possible by one-time federal funds from the American Rescue Plan Act of 2021. Frazier was Chief Author of the Essential Workers Emergency Leave Act, the original legislation that aimed to provide emergency paid sick leave to employees excluded from federal Families First Coronavirus Response Act.

On September 1, 2021, Hennepin County Attorney Mike Freeman announced that he would retire at the end of his term after 24 years in the role. Frazier became widely seen as a potential candidate for the position. But after expressing interest in it, Frazier announced that he had concluded that 2022 was not the right time for him to run for Hennepin County Attorney. On December 6, 2021, Frazier endorsed former Hennepin County chief public defender Mary Moriarty for Hennepin County Attorney.

On December 13, 2022, Frazier was elected co-chair of the Minnesota House People of Color and Indigenous (POCI) Caucus along with Representative Esther Agbaje.

=== Committee assignments ===
2026

- Ways & Means (chair)
- Workforce Development Finance & Policy
- Judiciary Finance & Civil Law

2025

- Judiciary Finance & Civil Law (vice chair)
- Workforce Development Finance & Policy
- Energy Finance & Policy

2023–2025

- Judiciary Finance & Civil Law (vice chair)
- Education Policy
- Public Safety Finance & Policy
- Workforce Development Finance & Policy

2021–2023

- Public Safety Finance & Policy (vice chair)
- Judiciary Finance & Policy
- Education Policy
- Economic Development Finance & Policy

== Hennepin County Attorney ==
On August 6, 2025, incumbent Hennepin County Attorney Mary Moriarty announced that she would not seek reelection. On August 18, 2026, Frazier announced his candidacy for the position. Acting U.S. Attorney Anders Folk also ran for the office. Frazier campaigned on a progressive platform, emphasizing accountability for unlawful conduct by federal immigration agents during Operation Metro Surge.

On June 13, 2026, the Minnesota Democratic–Farmer–Labor Party endorsed Frazier. On November 3, he won the general election, defeating Folk.

== Elections ==
2026 Hennepin County Attorney general election
Party	Candidate	Votes	%
Nonpartisan	Cedrick Frazier	257,445	50.55
Nonpartisan	Anders Folk	249,145	48.92
	Write-in	2,665	0.52
Total votes		509,255	100.00

2026 Hennepin County Attorney primary election
Party	Candidate	Votes	%
Nonpartisan	Cedrick Frazier	87,447	35.95
Nonpartisan	Anders Folk	55,610	22.86
Nonpartisan	Diane Krenz	46,150	18.97
Nonpartisan	Hao Nguyen	36,424	14.97
Nonpartisan	Matt Pelikan	17,648	7.25
Total votes		243,279	100.00

2024 Minnesota House General Election District 43A
Party	Candidate	Votes	%
Democratic (DFL)	Cedrick Frazier	13,845	66.33%
Republican	Todd Hesemann	6,999	33.53%
	Write-in	29	0.14%

2022 Minnesota House General Election District 43A
Party	Candidate	Votes	%
Democratic (DFL)	Cedrick Frazier	12,266	96.64%
	Write-In	427	3.36%

2020 Minnesota House General Election District 45A
Party	Candidate	Votes	%
Democratic (DFL)	Cedrick Frazier	13,870	63.08%
Republican	Jesse Pfliger	8,086	36.77%
	Write-in	32	0.15%

2020 Minnesota House Primary Election District 45A
Party	Candidate	Votes	%
Democratic (DFL)	Cedrick Frazier	3,697	68.77%
Democratic (DFL)	Daonna Depoister	1,679	31.23%

== Personal life ==
Frazier and his wife, Stella, have three daughters. Their family resides in New Hope, Minnesota.
