= Gary Flakne =

American politician

Member of the Minnesota House of Representatives from the 61A district
- In office 1963–1973

Hennepin County Attorney
- In office 1973-1969
- Preceded by: George M. Scott
- Succeeded by: Tom Johnson

Personal details
- Born: March 12, 1934 Minneapolis, Minnesota, U.S.
- Died: January 3, 2016 (aged 81) Minnesota, U.S.
- Party: Republican
- Occupation: lawyer

Gary W. Flakne (March 12, 1934 – January 3, 2016) was an American politician in the state of Minnesota. He was born in Minneapolis, Minnesota of Norwegian descent and was a lawyer. He was an alumnus of the University of Minnesota and William Mitchell College of Law (L.L.B. 1960). He served in the House of Representatives for District 35 from 1963 to 1973, and for District 61A in 1973. Flakne served in the Minnesota National Guard and was judge advocate general; he later served in the Minnesota Reserves. He also served as Hennepin County attorney. Flakne died on January 3, 2016, from multiple organ failure. He was married with four children.
