= George M. Scott (Minnesota judge) =

American judge

Associate Justice of the Minnesota Supreme Court
- In office 1973–1987
- Appointed by: Wendell R. Anderson

County Attorney of Hennepin County
- In office 1955–1973
- Preceded by: Michael J. Dillon
- Succeeded by: Gary Flakne

Personal details
- Born: September 14, 1922 Clark, New Jersey, U.S.
- Died: May 25, 2006 (aged 83) Miami, Florida, U.S.
- Party: Democratic
- Children: 5
- Education: St. Paul College of Law (LLB)

Military service
- Branch/service: United States Army
- Battles/wars: World War II

George Matthew Scott (September 14, 1922 – May 25, 2006) was an American lawyer and jurist who served on the Minnesota Supreme Court.

== Early life and education ==
The youngest of eight children, Scott was born in Clark, New Jersey, and grew up in a rural home without electricity or running water. Scott joined the United States Army in 1942 and studied engineering at the University of Minnesota through an Army-funded program. The program was eventually ended and Scott participated in the Normandy landings. He studied law at New York University before earning his law degree from the St. Paul College of Law.

== Career ==
After graduating from law school, Scott practiced law in Minneapolis. Scott was a Minnesota deputy attorney general and attorney for Hennepin County, Minnesota. In 1970, Scott sought the Democrat nomination in the 1970 Minnesota gubernatorial election, losing to Wendell R. Anderson. In 1973, Scott was appointed to the Minnesota Supreme Court and served until 1987.

== Personal life ==
Scott retired in Miami because of ill health. Scott and his wife, Joyce, had five children, three of whom became attorneys.
