= Mary Moriarty =

American politician (born 1964)

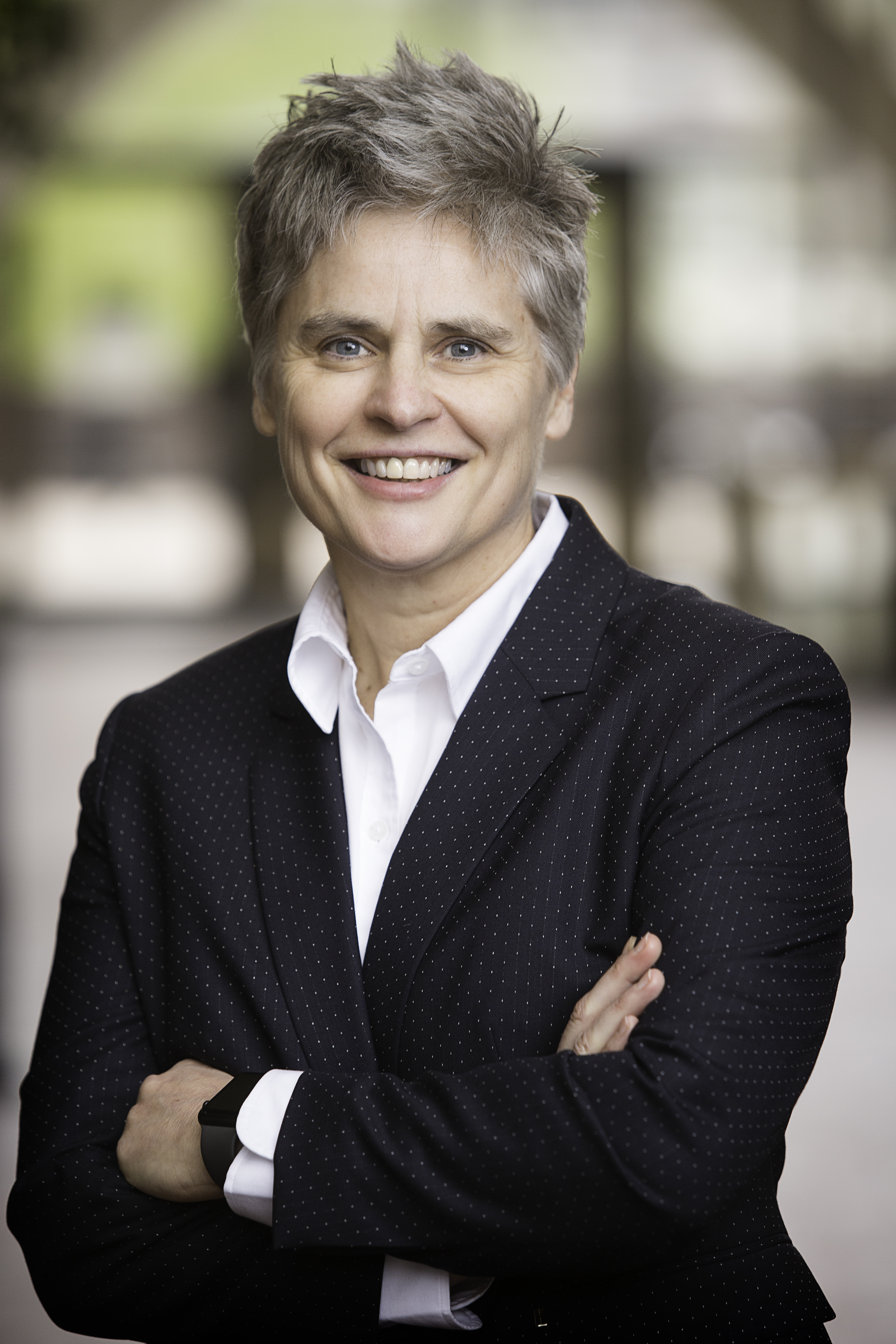
- Moriarty in 2018

Hennepin County Attorney
- Incumbent
- Assumed office January 2, 2023
- Preceded by: Michael O. Freeman
- Succeeded by: Cedrick Frazier (elect)

Personal details
- Born: Mary Frances Moriarty; January 14, 1964 (age 62) Benson, Minnesota, U.S.
- Party: Democratic
- Education: Macalester College (BA); University of Minnesota (JD)
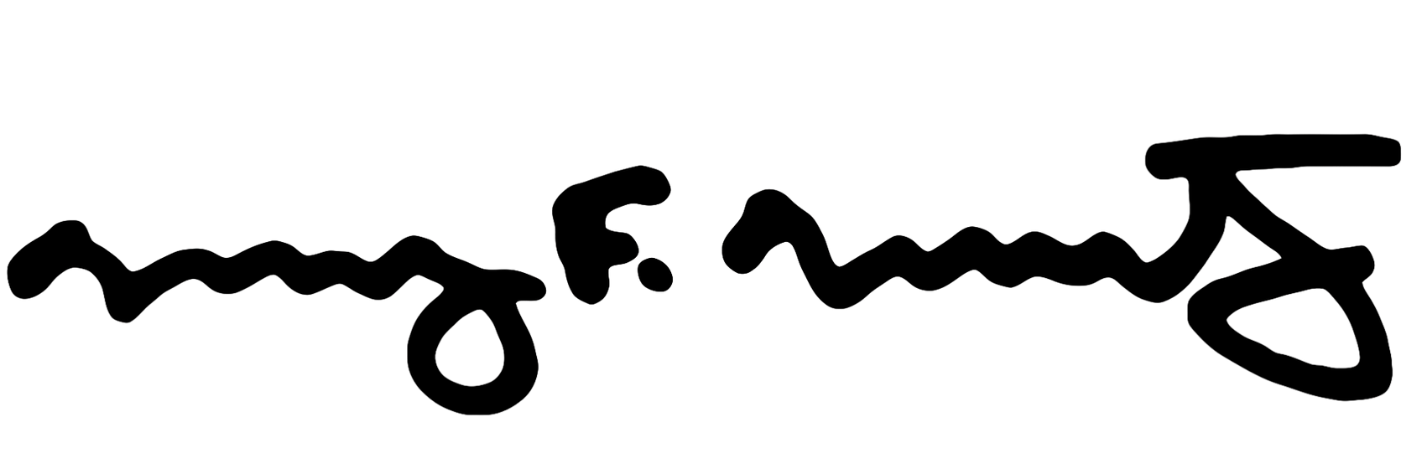
- Signature

Mary Frances Moriarty (born January 14, 1964) is an American attorney serving as the County Attorney of Hennepin County, Minnesota. A member of the Minnesota Democratic–Farmer–Labor Party (DFL), Moriarty previously served as the Chief Public Defender of Hennepin County.

== Early life and education ==
Moriarty was born in Benson, Minnesota. Her mother, Linda, was an English teacher. Her father, Patrick, served as the Itasca County Attorney from 1963 to 1969, and was later a public defender in New Ulm. Moriarty worked briefly as a reporter before enrolling at Macalester College, where she played softball and basketball and majored in history and political science, earning her Bachelor of Arts in 1986. In 1989, she earned a Juris Doctor from the University of Minnesota Law School. After clerking for Hennepin County judge Kevin Burke and passing the bar exam, Moriarty went to work for the Hennepin County Public Defender's Office.

== Career ==
Early in her career as a public defender, Moriarty argued a case that would eventually go to the U.S. Supreme Court. A Minneapolis police officer had patted down a man and claimed that he could feel through the man's jacket that a small lump was crack cocaine, justifying the search. Moriarty argued that it would have been impossible to identify the lump as drugs. On June 7, 1993, the high court unanimously agreed, ruling that the officer had exceeded the limits of a legal pat-down. The case (Minnesota v. Dickerson) established what is referred to across the United States as the plain feel doctrine.

=== Chief public defender of Hennepin County ===
In 2014, after spending 25 years as a public defender, Moriarty was selected as Hennepin County's first female chief public defender. As chief, Moriarty oversaw some 45,000 cases per year and managed a staff of 140 attorneys and over 70 support staff including investigators, dispositional advisors, paralegals, IT personnel, legal office assistants and law clerks. An evaluation from the National Center for State Courts stated that under Moriarty's leadership, Hennepin County had one of the best public defender offices in the country, one that was as successful as a private law firm.

Moriarty and her team exposed inequities in the criminal legal system within Hennepin County. In 2018, they showed that low-level marijuana stings in Hennepin County overwhelmingly targeted Black people. Moriarty's office forced Hennepin County Attorney Mike Freeman and the Minneapolis Police Department to stop the stings, which many viewed as racially biased. In 2020, Moriarty's office conducted a study that revealed Black people were overwhelmingly more likely to be stopped by police for traffic violations—even though White drivers were more likely to have contraband.

On December 23, 2019, Minnesota State Public Defender Bill Ward announced that he was placing Moriarty on indefinite suspension. The Minnesota Board of Public Defense hired a law firm to investigate allegations that she had posted offensive content on social media, created a fearful environment in her office and fractured relationships with criminal justice leaders. Ward requested that the state board not renew the contract of Moriarty. Minnesota Attorney General Keith Ellison said that Moriarty is “one of the most principled people I know. I'm concerned about her treatment; it appears connected to her advocacy for racial justice.” Ellison called for the Minnesota Board of Public Defense to examine the process that led to Moriarty's suspension, saying he believed Moriarty was targeted for speaking out against racial bias in the criminal justice system.

On September 30, 2020, the Minnesota Board of Public Defense voted 4–2 against re-appointing Moriarty. During the six-hour board meeting, Moriarty rebutted accusations made against her, saying she was being attacked because of her advocacy for her clients and against racial injustices. Moriarty accused the board of sexism and holding a double standard regarding her advocacy for clients and staff. Moriarty clashed with Ward, who she said bullied and harassed her, belittling her by calling her "young lady."

On June 22, 2021, the Minnesota Board of Public Defense agreed to pay Moriarty a $300,000 settlement. The state board did not admit wrongdoing, but it "agreed to a complete settlement of all of the disputes" between state leadership and Moriarty, avoiding a future lawsuit, according to the out-of-court settlement. In return, Moriarty officially retired from the Hennepin County Public Defender's Office.

=== Hennepin County Attorney (2022–present) ===
On September 1, 2021, Hennepin County Attorney Mike Freeman announced that he would retire at the end of his term after 24 years in the role. Moriarty announced the same day that she would explore a campaign for the open Hennepin County Attorney position. On September 27, 2021, Moriarty officially declared her candidacy. She came out as queer during her campaign. Moriarty earned the endorsement of the Minnesota DFL at its convention in Hopkins on May 14, 2022, after two rounds of voting. A nonpartisan primary was held on August 9, 2022, with Moriarty and former judge Martha Holton Dimick advancing to the general election. On November 8, 2022, Moriarty was elected Hennepin county attorney, defeating Dimick. She is the first known LGBT person to serve as the Hennepin County Attorney.

On November 14, 2022, Moriarty announced that State Representative Cedrick Frazier and law professor Mark Osler would serve as co-chairs of her transition committee.

In a notable case from March 2023, Moriarty offered plea deals to two 15- and 17-year-old brothers charged with second-degree murder after shooting and killing 23-year-old Zaria McKeever in Brooklyn Park on the orders of Zaria's ex-boyfriend, 22-year-old Erick Haynes. The plea deals allowed the defendants to serve 18 to 24 months in a juvenile correctional facility, with probation upon release until the age of 21, in exchange for testifying against Haynes. Moriarty's decision was criticized by the family of the murder victim, Attorney General Keith Ellison, Minnesota's largest police union, and community activists, who felt betrayed by what they viewed as lack of accountability for the killers and a miscarriage of justice for survivors. An Assistant Hennepin County Attorney who had worked on the case for months also voluntarily removed herself from the case in protest. Moriarty defended her decision, stating "Our goal is to treat kids like kids," and "We know that kids that age are impressionable, they are impulsive, they're easily manipulated and subjected to peer pressure." On April 6, 2023, Governor Tim Walz authorized Ellison to take over the murder case from Moriarty over her objections, despite Ellison previously criticizing the idea of circumventing a county attorney without their permission.

After the McKeever case, Moriarty has repeatedly come under criticism over perceived leniency in treatment of violent offenders. Throughout 2023, Moriarty has been criticized by families of victims and prosecutors in her office over her decisions to offer probation to two 17-year-olds charged with murder, a person charged with sexually assaulting a 15-year-old girl, a drug dealer charged with murder after knowingly giving fentanyl-laced pills to an overdose victim, a teen who was charged with murder after shooting a driver during a deadly carjacking, and a man charged with sexually assaulting a nine-year-old girl. Some victims' family members have petitioned Ellison to take over cases from Moriarty, as he did in the McKeever case.

In September 2023, Moriarty contradicted Ellison over a legal opinion on restraints by school resource officers (SRO). A law passed by the Minnesota Legislature in 2023 had altered legally permissible restraints by SROs, leading to confusion over permissible restraints and SROs pulling out of schools due to uncertainty over liability under the law. On September 20, Ellison issued a legal opinion that SROs may continue to restrain lawbreaking students, which led to the return of some SROs. A week later, Moriarty disputed Ellison's interpretation, causing further confusion on the law. Moriarty acknowledged that only the attorney general could issue a binding opinion, but pointed out that a judge may rule differently in court.

In September 2023, Moriarty announced that she would consider prosecution of a state trooper involved in the deadly shooting of Ricky Cobb II. Moriarty emphasized her consulting of a use-of-force expert, saying that their independent review would be "a critical part of our process". She later charged the trooper with murder in January 2024, determining that "charges were appropriate without the use of an expert". Moriarty had retained Jeffrey Noble as her expert, who had previously testified for Ramsey County prosecutors that the shooting of Philando Castile was unreasonable. Moriarty stopped consulting with Noble after a meeting regarding his preliminary thoughts on the case, where Noble gave his opinion that the trooper acted reasonably in shooting Cobb. Governor Walz questioned Moriarty's strategy, saying, "But as a layman on this, why would you not listen to use of force? Why would that not be central to something you do?", and advocating for the release of relevant documents in the case. The State Patrol's use-of-force expert also provided an affidavit stating that prosecutors in Moriarty's office had cherry-picked his statements to produce a criminal complaint against the trooper, who the expert said had acted in accordance with training. In June 2024, Moriarty dropped the case against the state trooper, Ryan Londregan.

In April 2025, Moriarty began requiring prosecutors to consider race when negotiating plea deals. In May, the U.S. Department of Justice initiated a civil rights investigation into the Hennepin County Attorney's Office over Moriarty's policy.

In August 2025, Moriarty announced she will not seek relection, so that her time in office will end on January 4, 2027. She was a founding member of the Project for the Fight Against Federal Overreach with eight other prosecutors. The coalition will assist in prosecuting federal law enforcement officers who violate state laws.

== Electoral history ==
2022 Hennepin County Attorney primary election
Party	Candidate	Votes	%
Nonpartisan	Mary Moriarty	62,336	36.36
Nonpartisan	Martha Holton Dimick	30,668	17.89
Nonpartisan	Ryan Winkler	27,924	16.29
Nonpartisan	Tad Jude	18,124	10.58
Nonpartisan	Paul Ostrow	14,500	8.46
Nonpartisan	Saraswati Singh	12,280	7.16
Nonpartisan	Jarvis Jones	5,586	3.26
Total votes		171,418	100.00

2022 Hennepin County Attorney general election
Party	Candidate	Votes	%
Nonpartisan	Mary Moriarty	254,418	57.59
Nonpartisan	Martha Holton Dimick	184,739	41.82
	Write-in	2,589	0.59
Total votes		441,746	100.00

== See also ==
- List of first openly LGBT politicians in the United States
- List of County Attorneys of Hennepin County
