= Andrew M. Luger =

American lawyer (born 1959)

Andrew Luger
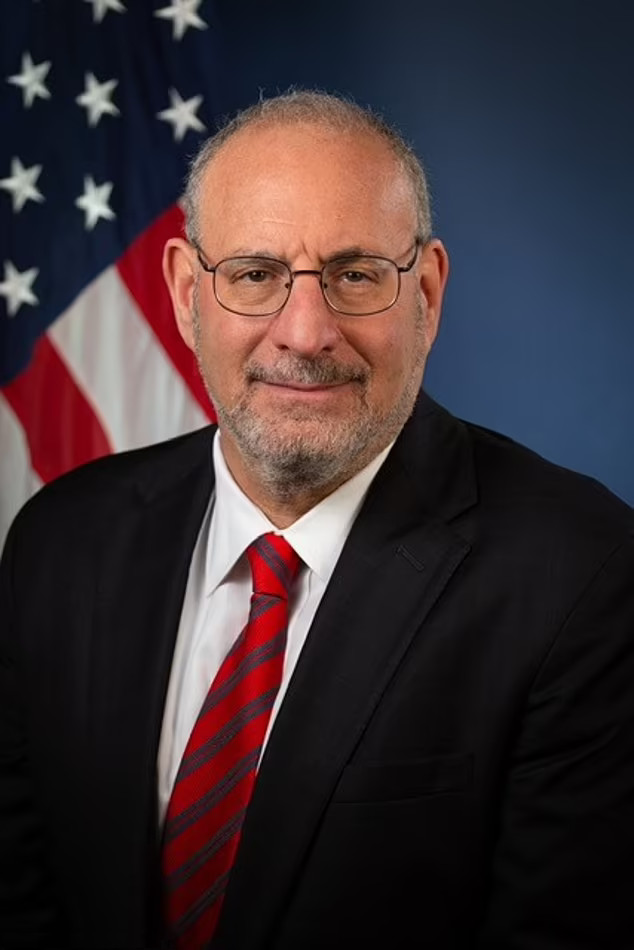

United States Attorney for the District of Minnesota
- In office March 30, 2022 – January 15, 2025
- President: Joe Biden
- Preceded by: Anders Folk (acting)
- Succeeded by: Daniel N. Rosen
- In office February 14, 2014 – March 10, 2017
- President: Barack Obama; Donald Trump
- Preceded by: B. Todd Jones
- Succeeded by: Erica MacDonald

Personal details
- Born: Andrew Mark Luger; May 20, 1959 (age 67) Englewood, New Jersey, U.S.
- Party: Democratic
- Education: Amherst College (BA); Georgetown University (JD)

Andrew Mark Luger (born May 20, 1959) is an American attorney and lawyer who served from 2014 to 2017 and from 2022 to 2025 as the United States Attorney for the District of Minnesota.

== Education ==
Luger received his Bachelor of Arts summa cum laude from Amherst College in 1981 and his Juris Doctor magna cum laude from Georgetown University Law Center in 1985.

== Legal career ==
Luger worked in private practice at the law firm Townley & Updike from 1985 to 1987 and Stillman, Friedman & Shaw from 1987 to 1989. From 1989 to 1992, he served as an Assistant United States Attorney in the Business Fraud Unit of the United States Attorney's Office for the Eastern District of New York and as an Assistant United States Attorney in the White Collar Unit of the United States Attorney’s Office for the District of Minnesota from 1992 to 1995. From 1995 to 2014, he served as partner at the law firm of Greene Espel.

== United States attorney for the District of Minnesota ==
=== Service under Obama and Trump administrations ===
On November 13, 2013, President Barack Obama nominated Luger to serve as the United States attorney for the District of Minnesota. On February 12, 2014, his nomination was confirmed in the Senate by voice vote. He was sworn in on February 14, 2014.

He was responsible for charges filed against nine men trying to join ISIS, the decision not to file charges against the police officers who killed Jamar Clark, and the Jacob Wetterling prosecution. He has specialized in anti-extremism legal work. After resigning as U.S. attorney in 2017, he became a partner at Jones Day.

=== Service under Biden administration ===
On November 12, 2021, President Joe Biden announced his intent to nominate Luger to serve as the United States attorney for the District of Minnesota. On November 15, 2021, his nomination was sent to the United States Senate. On January 13, 2022, his nomination was reported out of the Senate Judiciary Committee by a voice vote, with Senators Mike Lee, Ted Cruz, Josh Hawley, and Marsha Blackburn voting nay. On March 16, 2022, the Senate invoked cloture on his nomination by a 61–36 vote. On March 24, his nomination was confirmed by a 60–36 vote. He was sworn into office on March 30. He resigned on January 15, 2025.
