= Ryan Winkler =

American politician

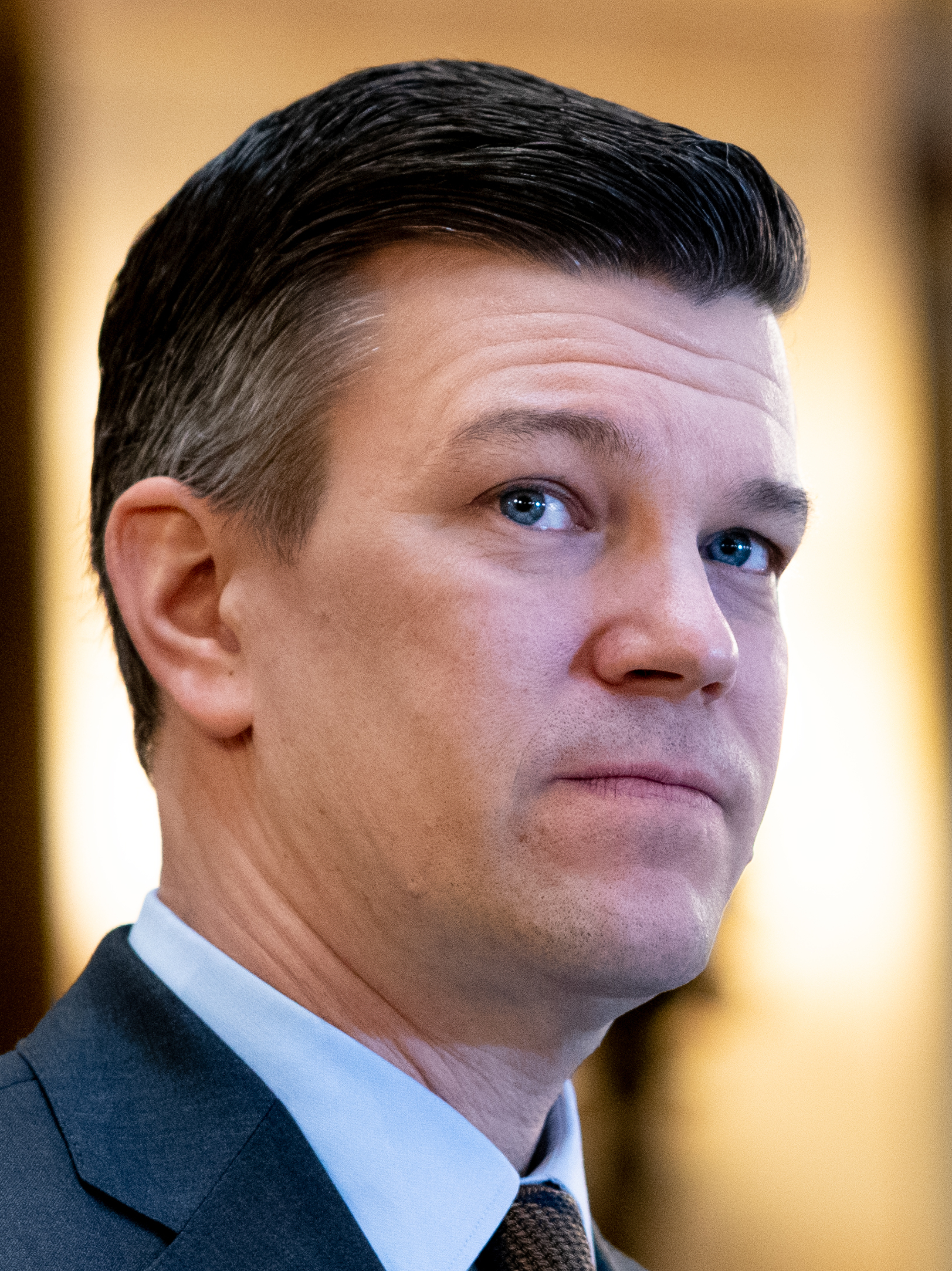
- Winkler in 2019

Majority Leader of the Minnesota House of Representatives
- In office January 8, 2019 – January 3, 2023
- Preceded by: Joyce Peppin
- Succeeded by: Jamie Long

Member of the Minnesota House of Representatives
- In office January 8, 2019 – January 3, 2023
- Preceded by: Peggy Flanagan
- Succeeded by: Larry Kraft (redistricted)
- Constituency: District 46A
- In office January 3, 2007 – July 1, 2015
- Preceded by: Ron Latz
- Succeeded by: Peggy Flanagan
- Constituency: District 44B (2007–2013); District 46A (2013–2015)

Personal details
- Born: Ryan Patrick Winkler; December 30, 1975 (age 50) Bemidji, Minnesota, U.S.
- Party: Democratic
- Children: 3
- Education: Harvard University (BA); University of Minnesota (JD)

Ryan Patrick Winkler (born December 30, 1975) is an American politician and the former majority leader of the Minnesota House of Representatives. A member of the Minnesota Democratic–Farmer–Labor Party (DFL), he represented District 46A, which includes portions of the cities of Golden Valley, Plymouth, and St. Louis Park in Hennepin County.

In February 2018, Winkler announced his intentions to run for the legislative office he previously held in District 46A. He was re-elected, succeeding Peggy Flanagan, who had left the house to run for lieutenant governor.

DFL legislators elected Winkler to serve as Majority Leader in November 2018, and he took office in January 2019.

Winkler announced that he would retire from the Minnesota House of Representatives at the end of his 2021–2023 term. He went on to run in the DFL primary election for Hennepin County Attorney on August 9, 2022, finishing in 3rd place.

== Education ==
Winkler graduated with a B.A. in history from Harvard University in 1998 and J.D. from the University of Minnesota Law School in 2001.

== Minnesota House of Representatives ==
He was first elected in 2006, and was re-elected in 2008, 2010, 2012, and 2014.

Following the United States Supreme Court's decision in Shelby County v. Holder, Winkler took to Twitter to write, "VRA majority is four accomplices to race discrimination and one Uncle Thomas" referring to Justice Clarence Thomas, an African American. "Uncle Tom" is a derogatory used against blacks who are perceived as being apologetic for their race. Winkler later deleted the tweet and posted, "Deleted Tweet causing offense regarding Justice Thomas. I apologize for it, but believe VRA decision does abet racism." On Twitter, he added that he did not understand "Uncle Tom" as a racist term.

On May 21, 2015, Winkler announced he would resign effective July 1, 2015. His wife at the time, Jenny, accepted a job as an executive with the Rezidor Hotel Group, which is headquartered in Brussels, Belgium, and his family moved there to support her.

=== Elections ===
2014 Minnesota State Representative- House 46A
Party	Candidate	Votes	%	±%
Democratic (DFL)	Ryan Winkler	10,666	66.17%	+0.28%
Republican	Timothy O. Manthey	5,425	33.66%	−0.30%

2012 Minnesota State Representative- House 46A
Party	Candidate	Votes	%	±%
Democratic (DFL)	Ryan Winkler	15,249	65.89%	+1.25%
Republican	John Swanson	7,860	33.96%	−1.32%

2010 Minnesota State Representative- House 44B
Party	Candidate	Votes	%	±%
Democratic (DFL)	Ryan Winkler	10,605	64.64%	−2.16%
Republican	Rick Rice	5,788	35.28%	+2.34%

2008 Minnesota State Representative- House 44B
Party	Candidate	Votes	%	±%
Democratic (DFL)	Ryan Winkler	14,524	66.80%	−2.49%
Republican	Bill Kadue	7,162	32.94%	+2.44%

2006 Minnesota State Representative- House 44B
Party	Candidate	Votes	%	±%
Democratic (DFL)	Ryan Winkler	11,987	69.29%	N/A
Republican	John Palmatier	5,276	30.50%	N/A

=== Later career ===
In 2021, legalizing recreational marijuana came up for a vote in front of the Minnesota House of Representatives for the first time. Winkler was a lead proponent of the push.

== Personal life ==
Winkler is Lutheran and has Norwegian ancestry. He has three sons.

In 2023, Winkler started a THC beverage company.

Minnesota House of Representatives
Preceded by Joyce Peppin	Majority Leader of the Minnesota House of Representatives; 2019–2023	Succeeded by Jamie Long
