= Michael O. Freeman =

American politician

Michael Freeman
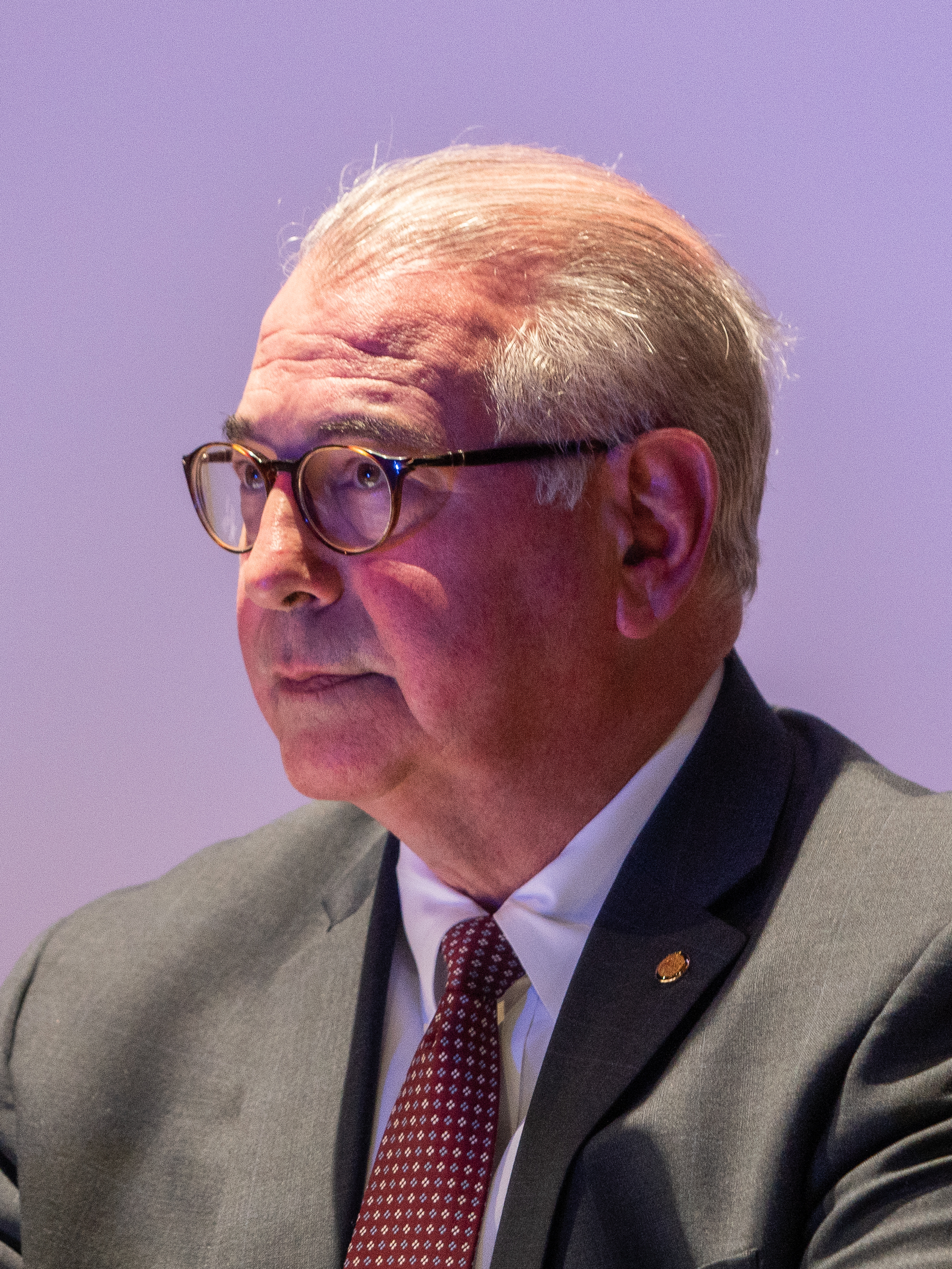
- Freeman in 2018

Hennepin County Attorney
- In office January 3, 2007 – January 2, 2023
- Preceded by: Amy Klobuchar
- Succeeded by: Mary Moriarty
- In office January 7, 1991 – January 5, 1999
- Preceded by: Tom Johnson
- Succeeded by: Amy Klobuchar

Member of the Minnesota Senate from the 40th district
- In office January 4, 1983 – January 7, 1991
- Preceded by: John B. Keefe
- Succeeded by: Phil Riveness

Personal details
- Born: Michael Orville Freeman; May 7, 1948 (age 78) Minneapolis, Minnesota, U.S.
- Party: Democratic
- Children: 5
- Parent(s): Orville Freeman; Jane Shields
- Education: Rutgers University (BA); University of Minnesota (JD)
- Occupation: Attorney, politician

Michael Orville Freeman (born May 7, 1948) is an American attorney and politician who served as the county attorney for Hennepin County from 1991 to 1999 and again from 2007 to 2023. While in office, he was the official responsible overseeing several high-profile criminal cases of excessive police force, including several unlawful killings by law enforcement officers. Freeman filed criminal charges against Derek Chauvin and three other Minneapolis police officers responsible for the murder of George Floyd in 2020, before the Minnesota Attorney General's office took over the case.

== Early life and education ==
Freeman was raised and educated in Minneapolis before moving to the Washington, D.C. area when his father Orville Freeman joined the cabinet of President John F. Kennedy. He is a graduate of Maryland's Bethesda-Chevy Chase High School. Freeman received a Bachelor of Arts from Rutgers University in 1970 and a Juris Doctor from the University of Minnesota Law School in 1974. He is the son of Jane Shields and Orville Freeman, who was a Minnesota governor and U.S. Secretary of Agriculture under presidents Kennedy and Lyndon B. Johnson. Freeman is married to journalist Kate McCarthy.

== Career ==
A member of the Minnesota Democratic–Farmer–Labor Party, Freeman was elected to the Minnesota Senate in 1982, representing the old District 40, which included the city of Richfield and a portion of Bloomington in Hennepin County. He was re-elected in 1986, serving as Majority Whip during his second term (1987–1991). He was also vice chair of the Finance Committee from 1987 to 1991, and of the Economic Development and Commerce Committee from 1983 to 1986. He also chaired the Economic Development Subcommittee from 1983 to 1986.

Freeman was elected Hennepin County Attorney in 1990, serving until 1999. He ran for county attorney again in 2006 after incumbent Amy Klobuchar opted to run for the U.S. Senate seat being vacated by Mark Dayton, and he was elected by a wide margin.

Freeman ran twice for governor of Minnesota. In 1994 he lost the DFL Party endorsement to John Marty. Marty was later defeated in the general election by incumbent Governor Arne Carlson. In 1998 he won the DFL Party endorsement but lost the primary election to Skip Humphrey, who went on to lose the general election to Jesse Ventura.

In 2019, Freeman took a short leave of absence to enter a treatment program for alcohol addiction.

On September 1, 2021, Freeman announced that he would retire at the end of his term after 24 years in the role.

=== Police brutality cases ===
As County Attorney, Freeman has dealt with several police brutality cases. He filed charges against Mohamed Noor for the shooting of Justine Damond, but declined to charge the officers involved in the shooting of Jamar Clark or the shooting of Thurman Blevins. Police body camera footage confirmed that Blevins had in fact fired gunshots at the officers before they returned fire.

=== Derek Chauvin case ===
In 2020, Freeman filed charges against officer Derek Chauvin in the murder of George Floyd. A group launched a petition drive to have Freeman recalled. The petitioners faulted Freeman for what they perceived as a long delay in charging Chauvin, as well as Freeman failing to recuse himself. On September 11, 2020, Hennepin County district judge Peter Cahill banned Freeman and three of his staffers from working on the cases against the former Minneapolis police officers charged in George Floyd's murder, including State v. Chauvin. The ruling related to a meeting some staff lawyers had with the Hennepin County medical examiner, a likely witness in the case, which allegedly violated the rules of professional conduct for attorneys. Nevertheless, Freeman played a vital role in Minnesota Attorney General Keith Ellison's prosecution team that secured Chauvin's conviction on April 20, 2021, providing "strategic advice and coordination" to other Hennepin County attorneys who served on the team.

== See also ==
- List of County Attorneys of Hennepin County

Party political offices
Preceded by John Marty	Endorsed Gubernatorial Candidate, Minnesota DFL State Convention; 1998	Succeeded by Roger Moe
