= 2018 Minnesota Senate district 54 special election =

- February 12, 2018

Minnesota Senate District 54
Nominee	Karla Bigham	Denny McNamara
Party	Democratic (DFL)	Republican
Popular vote	7,343	6,813
Percentage	50.73%	47.06%
- Results by precinct
Senator before election
Dan Schoen
Democratic (DFL)
Elected Senator
Karla Bigham
Democratic (DFL)

A special election was held in the U.S. state of Minnesota on February 12, 2018, to elect a new senator for District 54 in the Minnesota Senate, caused by the resignation of Dan Schoen effective on December 15, 2017. A primary election was held on January 29, 2018, to nominate a Republican candidate. It coincided with the House District 23B special election. The Democratic–Farmer–Labor (DFL) nominee, Karla Bigham, won the special election.

== Background ==
Location of District 54 in the Minneapolis–Saint Paul metropolitan area.

In November 2017, several women accused Senator Dan Schoen of sexually harassing them. On November 22, 2017, Schoen announced he would resign on December 15, 2017.

The special election garnered much attention given that the Republicans controlled the Senate only by a single seat as well as a legal question of whether a Republican senator should remain in the Senate. Senator Michelle Fischbach was the subject of a lawsuit challenging her ability to remain in the Senate after she became lieutenant governor in early January 2018 when DFL Lieutenant Governor Tina Smith resigned to be appointed to the U.S. Senate. As president of the Senate, Fischbach was first in line to succeed her. The lawsuit was dismissed without prejudice by the chief judge of the Minnesota Second District Court in Ramsey County on the day of the special election, but another lawsuit was likely. The DFL needed to retain the seat for there to be a potential that the DFL could win control of the Senate if a special election were to occur if Fischbach were removed from the Senate as a result of a lawsuit.

District 54 represents parts of the counties of Dakota and Washington. Schoen had represented the district in the Senate since January 2017, replacing retiring DFL incumbent Katie Sieben—who represented the area in the Senate since 2007 and previously in the House from 2003. Schoen previously represented District 54A, the western half of the district, in the House from 2013. In the last election in 2016, Schoen won with 53 percent of the vote compared to his Republican opponent's 47 percent.

== Candidates ==
Candidate filings were open from January 8 through January 11. As multiple Republican candidates filed for office, a primary election was held on January 29, 2018, to determine which candidate received the party's nomination.

=== Republican Party of Minnesota ===
The Senate District 54 Republicans held a convention to endorse a candidate on December 12, 2017. Former state Representative Denny McNamara won the endorsement. 2016 District 54 Republican nominee Leilani Holmstadt and Bob Anderson also sought the endorsement and said they would abide by it. James Brunsgaard, who did not seek the endorsement, was also a candidate. In explaining his decision to seek the Republican nomination, Brunsgaard said he did not like McNamara because he's a "self-serving politician."

- James Brunsgaard
- Denny McNamara, member of the Minnesota House of Representatives from 2003 to 2017 representing District 54B—the eastern half of District 54—and its predecessor, District 57B.

==== Withdrawn ====
- Bob Anderson
- Leilani Holmstadt, 2016 District 54 Republican nominee

=== Minnesota Democratic–Farmer–Labor Party ===
The Senate District 54 DFL endorsed former state Representative Karla Bigham on November 30, 2017.

- Karla Bigham, member of the Washington County Board of Commissioners since 2015; member of the Minnesota House of Representatives from 2007 to 2011 representing the predecessor of District 54A, the western half of District 54, District 57A.

=== Libertarian Party of Minnesota ===
- Emily Mellingen, nurse for the Minnesota Department of Corrections

== Primary election ==
=== Results ===
Republican primary election results by precinct.

Denny McNamara won the Republican nomination over James Brunsgaard in the primary election. McNamara said he appreciated Brunsgaard's willingness to put himself forward for public office. Brunsgaard said he would support Libertarian candidate Emily Mellingen.

Party	Candidate	Votes	%
Republican Party of Minnesota	Denny McNamara	1,328	84.91
Republican Party of Minnesota	James Brunsgaard	236	15.09
Republican Party of Minnesota	Subtotal	1,564	100.00
Minnesota Democratic–Farmer–Labor Party	Karla Bigham	449	100.00
Total		2,013	100.00
Invalid/blank votes		18	0.89
Turnout (out of 48,152 registered voters)		2,031	4.22
Source: Minnesota Secretary of State

== Results ==
DFL nominee Karla Bigham won over Republican nominee Denny McNamara. The result returned the Senate to the status quo before the vacancy of 34 Republican and 33 DFL senators, creating a potential future shift of control of the Senate in a special election if Republican Senator Michelle Fischbach were removed from her seat as a result of a lawsuit challenging her ability to remain in the Senate.

Party	Candidate	Votes	%	∆pp
Minnesota Democratic–Farmer–Labor Party	Karla Bigham	7,343	50.73	▼2.40
Republican Party of Minnesota	Denny McNamara	6,813	47.06	▲0.36
Libertarian Party of Minnesota	Emily Mellingen	313	2.16	▲2.16
Write-in	N/A	7	0.05	▼0.11
Total		14,476	100.00	±0.00
Invalid/blank votes		2	0.01	▼5.37
Turnout (out of 48,456 registered voters)		14,478	29.88	▼52.60
Source: Minnesota Secretary of State

== See also ==
- List of special elections to the Minnesota Senate
