= James G. Sieben =

US Army general

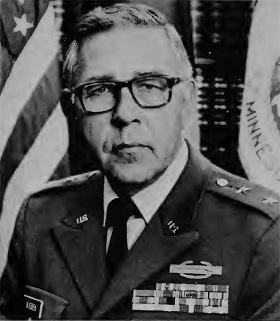
- Lieutenant General Sieben c. 1977
- Born: April 19, 1924; Hastings, Minnesota, U.S.
- Died: November 9, 1998
- Relatives: MG Harry "Tex" Sieben
- Military career
- Allegiance: United States
- Branch: United States Army
- Service years: c.1942–1988
- Rank: Lieutenant General
- Commands: Minnesota National Guard; 1st Brigade, 47th Infantry Division
- Conflicts: World War II; Korean War
- Awards: Silver Star, with Oak Leaf Cluster; Bronze Star; Purple Heart; Combat Infantryman Badge

James George Sieben (April 19, 1924 – November 9, 1998) was an American Lieutenant General and a former Adjutant General of the Minnesota National Guard, a position he held for thirteen years from 1975 to 1988. A veteran of World War II, the Dakota County Historical Society called Sieben one of the Minnesota National Guard's "most highly decorated soldiers" and a "soldier's soldier".

== World War II ==
After graduating from Hasting High School, Sieben enlisted in the Army in December 1942 at age 18 as a private. During World War II, he served with the 414th Infantry Regiment, 104th Infantry Division. After the unit arrived in France in September 1944, Sieben was involved in fighting in northern France, into Holland and Belgium, and finally, through the Rhineland into Germany.

Sieben was twice awarded the Silver Star for gallantry in combat for actions in Germany in November 1944 and March 1945, respectively. In the first such instance, then-Staff Sergeant Sieben and two comrades rescued a severely wounded officer despite "a hail of small arms and mortar fire". In the second such instance, Sieben first directed American tank fire which eliminated several enemy snipers, then later when a tank was struck with enemy bazooka fire, dashed into a "hail of automatic weapons fire to extinguish the flames and save the tank from certain destruction". In one of these instances, Sieben was wounded in action.

== Return to Minnesota ==
Sieben returned to Minnesota in 1945, and in 1948, he joined the Minnesota Army National Guard, received a direct commission, and served as an Infantry Platoon Leader and Heavy Weapons Platoon Leader.

== Korean War ==
In 1951, Sieben was called to active federal service and served for two years during the Korean War. Sieben served as a regimental S2, intelligence and reconnaissance platoon leader, and intelligence officer. It has also been reported that Sieben's duty during this period of time included service as an intelligence officer in Austria. Sieben was also reported to have served on the General Staff of the U.S. Forces, Austria.

== National Guard service ==
In 1952, Sieben returned home and rejoined the Minnesota Army National Guard.

In April 1956, Sieben was assigned as superintendent, Minnesota Military Academy, State OCS. Minnesota became the seventh state in the US to inaugurate its own military academy. After complaints that the academy was being taught by instructors with no combat experience, Sieben directed his instructors to wear their service ribbons—turning up seven Silver Stars, five Bronze Stars, four Purple Hearts, and four Combat Infantryman Badges.

In April 1966, Sieben became Inspector General of the Minnesota Army National Guard until his promotion to Military Support Plans Officer in September 1966.

Sieben was promoted to Colonel in 1971, and in October 1973, took command of 1st Brigade, 47th Infantry Division (now known as the 34th Infantry Division). While serving as commander of this unit, Sieben received a Meritorious Service Medal for his accomplishments.

Also circa 1973, Sieben was involved with an initiative to conduct an exchange with Norwegian armed forces members to conduct cold-weather warfare cross-training. In 1974, 50 Minnesota Guardsmen went to Camp Torpo, Norway to train in winter operations with the Norwegian Home Guard. King Olav V of Norway presented Sieben one of Norway's highest honors, the Order of the Commodore of the Royal Order of St. Olav. Sieben traveled to Norway in 1998 as part of a Minnesota delegation to celebrate the 25th consecutive year of this exchange.

In May 1975, at age 50, Sieben was appointed as the Adjutant General of Minnesota by Gov. Wendell Anderson, and in October, the US Senate confirmed his promotion to one-star Brigadier General. In his new role, Sieben was responsible for the 13,000 members of the Minnesota Air and Army National Guard. In September 1977, the US Senate confirmed Sieben's promotion to two-star Major General.

In 1984, Sieben received the Distinguished Service Medal from the National Guard Association of the United States at its 106th General Conference in New York City, recognizing his role in developing Camp Ripley into a major winter training center.

In March 1985, Sieben was awarded the Legion of Merit by Lieutenant General Edward C. Peter II, commander of the U.S. Fourth Army, for exceptionally meritorious service as Minnesota’s Adjutant General. The citation credited his professional leadership with improving the Minnesota National Guard’s operational readiness and ensuring that it met Army training and readiness objectives.

He served in the Adjutant General position for thirteen years until April 1988, when he reached the mandatory retirement age of 64.

Upon his retirement, Minnesota Governor Rudy Perpich proclaimed April 16, 1988, his retirement day, as Major General James G. Sieben Day. Sieben's hometown, Hastings, also named a main road—General Sieben Drive—in recognition of him.

== Awards and decorations ==
Sieben's awards and decorations the Silver Star with Oak Leaf Cluster (to denote second award), Bronze Star, Purple Heart, Meritorious Service Medal, Combat Infantryman Badge, Good Conduct Medal, American Campaign Medal, European-African-Middle Eastern Campaign Medal, World War II Victory Medal, Army of Occupation Medal (Germany), National Defense Service Medal, Armed Forces Reserve Medal, Army Reserve Components Achievement Medal, the Norwegian Order of St. Olaf, the Swedish Distinguished Service Medal, as well as the Minnesota Distinguished Service Medal, the Minnesota Medal for Merit, and the Minnesota Commendation Medal.

== Education ==
Sieben's education included three years at the University of Minnesota and one year at Stanford University. He was also a graduate of the US Army Command and General Staff College. Sieben also completed professional training courses including Combat Intelligence Staff Officer Course, Air-Ground Operations Course, Infantry Officer Career Course, Civil Disturbance Senior Officer Orientation Course, Industrial College of the Armed Forces and National Security Management, and Brigade Staff Officer Course.

== Dates of promotion ==
Dates of Rank
Insignia	Rank	Date
	COL	June 30, 1971
	BG	September 18, 1975
	MG	September 21, 1977

== Personal life ==
Sieben was born in Hastings, Minnesota to a family active in government and politics: his father, Harry, was a mayor of Hastings, as was his grandfather, J. George. His mother, Irene, was a delegate to the Democratic National Convention in 1948. Sieben's older brother Harry Sieben Sr., twice ran for the US Congress and served as a presidential appointee of US President John F. Kennedy.

Sieben was uncle of Speaker of the Minnesota House of Representatives Harry A. Sieben, who also served as acting Adjutant General of the Minnesota National Guard during 2003, and Representative Mike Sieben, and great uncle of Katie Sieben, who served as a member of the Minnesota Senate.

General Sieben himself said, "I wouldn't care to run for anything. I found my niche in the military."

Sieben was married to his wife, Charlotte, and had three children, sons James and Terrance, and daughter Lisa.

Diagnosed with cancer, Sieben died at the St. Joseph Hospice in Saint Paul, Minnesota.
