= Kunesh =

Kunesh may refer to:

== Places ==
- Kunesh, Wisconsin, unincorporated community in Brown County, Wisconsin, United States

== People ==
- Mary Kunesh, member of the Minnesota Senate
- Patrice Kunesh, attorney and commissioner of the Administration for Native Americans
