= Satveer Chaudhary =

American politician

Member of the Minnesota Senate
- In office January 3, 2001 – January 3, 2011
- Preceded by: Steven G. Novak
- Succeeded by: Barb Goodwin
- Constituency: 52nd district (2001–2003); 50th district (2003–2011)

Member of the Minnesota House of Representatives from the 52A district
- In office January 7, 1997 – January 2, 2001
- Preceded by: Skip Carlson
- Succeeded by: Barb Goodwin

Personal details
- Born: June 12, 1969 (age 57) Minneapolis, Minnesota, U.S.
- Party: Minnesota Democratic-Farmer-Labor Party
- Spouse: Dee Chaudhary
- Children: 1
- Education: St. Olaf College and Oxford University, Manchester College (B.A.); University of Minnesota Law School (J.D.)
- Occupation: Attorney

Satveer Singh Chaudhary (born June 12, 1969) is an American criminal defense and immigration lawyer. He is also a politician and a former member of the Minnesota State Senate and the Minnesota House of Representatives serving from 1996 to 2010.

During his fourteen-year tenure, Chaudhary represented portions of Anoka and Ramsey counties in the northern Minneapolis and St Paul metropolitan area. The Senate District at the time of his departure from politics was known as Senate District 50. However, Chaudhary also represented the area in the Minnesota House from 1997-2000 as District 52A; and in the Senate from 2001 to 2002 as Senate District 52. While in office, Chaudhary served as a member of the Minnesota Democratic-Farmer-Labor Party, was the first Asian American legislator in Minnesota history. He was also the first South Asian senator in American history and for a time was the highest ranking political official of South Asian descent, as well as one of the youngest senators in that state's history.

On August 10, 2010, Chaudhary was defeated by former Minnesota House Member Barb Goodwin in the primary election for the Minnesota State Senate seat. He then went on to resume his full time career as a private practice attorney in the Twin Cities of Minneapolis-St. Paul.

== Early life and career ==
Chaudhary was born in Minneapolis in 1969, three years after his parents immigrated from Haryana and Uttar Pradesh, India. His father, Dr. Surendra Pal Singh Chaudhary, is a retired inspector with the United States Department of Agriculture. Chaudhary's mother, Raj Mohini Chaudhary, worked as a research assistant at the University of Minnesota, owned an import firm, and established a family wellness foundation for the South Asian community SEWA-AIFW.

In 1977 Chaudhary's parents moved to the Minneapolis suburb, Fridley, Minnesota, where Chaudhary spent the remainder of his youth. He attended Columbia Heights High School, and it was during high school Chaudhary stated that government teacher, Jack Gause, first involved him in state politics.

Upon graduation from high school in 1987, Chaudhary pursued his degree at St. Olaf College in Northfield, Minnesota. As an undergraduate, Chaudhary was in the student senate, the multi-cultural student association, political awareness committee organizer and lobbied for the state student coalition. In the summer and fall of 1989, while still a college student, Chaudhary served as Special Assistant to Hubert H. (Skip) Humphrey III. During his junior year, he attended Manchester College, Oxford University in England where he studied British and American foreign policy, and was a member of the famed Oxford Union debating society, the Oxford Law Society, and Oxford Indian Students Association. Before Chaudhary's 1991 return to the United States from Great Britain, he traveled extensively in India, South Africa, and Namibia. There he witnessed the first celebration of Namibia's independence day, and met both Nelson Mandela and Bishop Desmond Tutu. Chaudhary stated these experiences were an opportunity to witness truly international struggle. Back in Minnesota, Chaudhary went on to graduate from St. Olaf, receiving his B.A. in Political Science.

Chaudhary and then served as a foreign policy staff member for Senator Edward Kennedy, working in the area of foreign policy. In 1992, he took a year off from academics to work on the Tom Harkin presidential campaign and Gerry Sikorski's last 6th Congressional District race.

After his time in Washington, D.C., Chaudhary continued his studies in law at the University of Minnesota Law School. As a law student, Chaudhary clerked for Judge John Stanoch and at the Hennepin County, Minnesota Attorney’s Office. Chaudhary also acted as Special Assistant to Skip Humphrey during his time as Attorney General of Minnesota. He received the Governor’s Certificate of Commendation for his work with the Legal Aid Society in Minneapolis and was an author for the Journal of Global Trade. Chaudhary graduated from law school in 1995.

== Minnesota House of Representatives ==
Just two weeks out of law school, Chaudhary ran for the Minnesota House of Representatives in the July 1995 special election for the District 52A legislative seat, in a Minneapolis suburban area that includes parts of Fridley and New Brighton and all of Columbia Heights and Hilltop. Chaudhary lost the race, but later defeated the winner, Republican incumbent Skip Carlson in a 1996 rematch. At the time he was elected, Chaudhary became the first Asian-American member of the Minnesota Legislature, and the fourth Indian-American elected to a state legislature in U.S. history. When he joined the legislature, there was only three other minority representatives in the House; Richard "Jeff" Jefferson, Edwina Garcia and Carlos Mariani. With Chaudhary's election, the number of minorities in the entire Minnesota legislature totaled five.

While in the House, Chaudhary made contributed to legislation on healthcare access, education and economic development priorities. During this period of Chaudhary's legislative career, he was a member of the Minnesota Conservation Federation, the Columbia Heights Lions Club, the Fridley Kiwanis, and became a member of the Fridley Human Resources Commission.

Chaudhary also worked closely in his first legislative months with Minnesota's Asian community, and on public safety issues, particularly DWI penalties and youth driving regulations. Records for Chaudhary's freshman House term list 103 House Documents Found In Legislative Session 80 (1997–1998) listing him as Author or Chief Author. As a freshman legislator in the Minnesota House of Representatives, Chaudhary served on the Education Committee and assorted sub-committees, the Judiciary Committee and Judiciary sub-committees and the Local Government and Metropolitan Affairs Committee.

Chaudhary was re-elected to the House in 1998. During his second term in office, he continued to work on environmental legislation and financial reform of the Minnesota State Lottery. He also became a member of the Police Officers Alliance of Minnesota. There were 97 House Documents Found In Legislative Session 81 (1999–2000) listing bills with Satveer Chaudhary as Authors or Chief Author. During his second term as a legislator in the Minnesota House of Representatives, Chaudhary served on the Education Policy Committee, Family and Early Childhood Education Finance Committee, and Jobs and Economic Development Policy Committee.

== Minnesota Senate ==
In 2000, incumbent Senator Steve Novak resigned to run for Minnesota's 4th congressional district. Chaudhary received the nomination from the local Minnesota Democratic–Farmer–Labor Party chapter and ran against Republican Daniel Coughlin in the November general election. Chaudhary won the election with 57 percent of the votes.

When he joined the Senate at age 31, Satveer Chaudhary was the Minnesota Senate's youngest member, and became the first Asian-Indian state senator in American history. In 2001, Chaudhary was chosen to be a delegate by the American Council of Young Political Leaders representing the United States State Legislatures and traveling to Argentina and Uruguay. Later that year, he escorted the Dalai Lama during his State visit to Minnesota.

Due to the 2000 Census and redistricting, Chaudhary's first Minnesota senate term was two years. In 2002, he ran for a four-year term in the newly-redistricted SD-52 against Republican Steve Minar. Chaudhary won the election with 55.5 percent of the vote. During his next term, Chaudhary served on new Senate committees focusing on the environment, and assumed a leadership position within the Senate as Senate Majority Whip.

As Vice Chair of the Fish and Game Subcommittee, Chaudhary was the Chief Author of the 2005 Legislative Commission on Minnesota Resources reform bill, and co-authored legislation on clean air and water. In January 2006 Chaudhary worked with labor unions to ask then-Governor Tim Pawlenty to step in and help to save jobs of 12,3000 Minnesotans employed by Northwest Airlines. The bankrupt carrier proposed outsourcing about a quarter of the jobs left at the airline, and wrap up its drive for $1.4 billion in annual wage and other givebacks from its employees. In 2006, because of his work with the environmental legislations, citizen's groups and outdoors organizations, Chaudhary was appointed by Senate Majority Leader, Dean Johnson, to serve on the newly-created Legislative and Citizen’s Commission on Minnesota Resources.

On April 25, 2006, the Saint Paul Police Department investigated a racial death threat made against the senator. Chaudhary, who had just voted against a ballot measure to ban same-sex marriage, had received a letter containing a picture of himself with a bullet hole through his forehead. The picture was attached to a newspaper ad run promoting the constitutional amendment to ban same-sex marriage and civil unions. In a media statement, Chaudhary denounced the letter as political hate speech. The group that ran the ad, Minnesota Citizens in Defense of Marriage, condemned the letter and said it did not condone threats of violence.

In November 2006, Chaudhary ran again for the SD-50 senate seat against Republican Rae Hart Anderson. He was re-elected to the Minnesota State Senate with 63% of the vote. Upon his victory the Republican opponent, Rae Hart Anderson, sent Chaudhary a concession email that said, "The race of your life is more important than this one--and it is my sincere wish that you'll get to know Jesus Christ as Lord and Savior." Chaudhary, a Hindu, made no public comment in response. In October 2007 Chaudhary was chosen as a delegate to accompany Governor Tim Pawlenty on a Minnesota/India trade mission, along with numerous business executives from Minnesota-based firms. There the senator was the moving force behind the sister-state partnership agreement between Haryana and Minnesota signed during the visit. The partnership - which was the first of its kind between a US and Indian state. On November 24, 2007 the Obama administration invited Chaudhary to attend a White House dinner honoring India Prime Minister Manmohan Singh. However, despite the connection with international and national politics, Chaudhary continued to focus the remainder of his senate term on conservation issues, state businesses, sportsman causes, and senate district concerns.

In 2010, after political controversies, Chaudhary lost the DFL endorsement for the SD-50 senate seat. He lost in the primary to DFL-endorsed former representative Barb Goodwin with 30.9 percent of the vote. With the departure of Senator Satveer Chaudhary, and the 2010 retirements of Senator Mee Moua and Representative Cy Thao, there were no individuals of Asian descent represented in the Minnesota legislature at that time.

== Conservation efforts ==
During his tenure at the Minnesota legislature Chaudhary received numerous awards by civic, conservation and outdoors organizations and acknowledgments by the press in the area of conservation. During his first years of the Senate Chaudhary attained multiple years of perfect legislative voting scores from the Conservation Minnesota Voter Center, and in 2005 Chaudhary was named the Minnesota Conservation Federation Legislator of the Year. By 2008 Ducks Unlimited recognized the senator as a Conservation Partner in Minnesota. In 2009 Senator Chaudhary and his wife were nominated for Outstanding Conservationists Award by Anoka Conservation District at the MASWCD Annual Meetings and Trade show for their efforts to deal with wetland damage near their Fridley, Minnesota home.

== Political adversities ==
Chaudhary experienced forms of bias while in the Minnesota House and Senate. On his first election night victory to the Minnesota legislature, at a celebratory event Chaudhary was told by an inner-city DFL House-member to "get a nickname" easier for people to pronounce. On another occasion Senator Chaudhary wore a Nehru jacket, reflective of his South Asian heritage, on the Senate floor. The act drew ire from members of the Minnesota State Senate, and one member even called for his removal from the chamber for not wearing a tie. The Nehru jacket is considered formal dress in the South Asian culture, and in keeping with the traditions of appropriate legislative attire. Notably, women in the Minnesota Senate did not wear ties.

During the 2010 legislative session upon request from Saint Louis County Commissioner, Dennis Fink, Chaudhary inserted a fish and game bill provision placing special conservation fishing regulations on Fish Lake. Chaudhary disclosed to members of the committee crafting the bill’s final language, that his family owns a cabin on leased land on the lake. The Senator approached Representative David Dill, and requested he insert the conservation language into a House bill. After close of the legislative session, Senate Republicans questioned the appropriateness of changes to the bill. Although no complaint had been filed, Senator Chaudhary requested an independent Senate Ethics Panel review and advisory opinion. On June 2, 2010 the bipartisan Minnesota Senate Subcommittee on Ethical Conduct voted unanimously that Chaudhary had no conflict of interest in introducing the legislation, had violated no rule nor law, although "he should have taken more time to hear the proposal" and the "any benefit to (Chaudhary) was pure speculation".

The Senate District 50 DFL Party leadership held meeting in June 2010 to discuss revocation of Chaudhary's DFL senate endorsement due to Chaudhary's formal endorsement of DFL gubernatorial candidate Mark Dayton over the DFL-endorsed candidate Margaret Anderson . On June 1, 2010 former State Representative Barbara Goodwin filed as a DFL senate candidate in the primary election. On June 28, 2010, the Senate District 50 DFL Central Committee voted to revoke their endorsement of Chaudhary due to the endorsement of Dayton, and endorsed Barbara Goodwin as the new candidate for Minnesota Senate. Chaudhary appealed the Senate District Committee's decision to a special panel of the State DFL Party.

On July 8, 2010 the Duluth News Tribune reported that Chaudhary and his wife owed the IRS 2007 and 2008 past-due personal income taxes. In response, Chaudhary stated the debt was incurred due to an exercise of stock options with his wife's employer, the couple had an existing IRS payment plan and was never delinquent in paying, and the amount owed had just been determined in late 2009. On August 1, 2010 the family announced all taxes were paid in full.

On July 11, 2010, the special panel of the Minnesota DFL Party unanimously upheld the revocation of Chaudhary's endorsement. Chaudhary still chose to proceed to the Minnesota primary election as an unendorsed DFL candidate. On August 10, 2010, Chaudhary was defeated in the primary, and in November democrat Barbara Goodwin was elected to the seat. That same year Mark Dayton went on to become the Minnesota Governor. After his primary defeat, Chaudhary announced that he would continue his involvement with outdoors issues and return to private law practice full-time.

== Law practice ==
In 2000, Chaudhary opened a private law office, and in Spring of 2002 he was featured on the cover of the Law Alumni News Magazine along with Senator Mee Moua. In 2004 he was named Alumni of the Year for the University of Minnesota Law School. Chaudhary's practice specializes in immigration and criminal law, where he continues to teach local and national continuing legal education courses, and is called upon for commentary on U.S. immigration issues. The Hennepin County Bar Association recognized eight member attorneys with its 2020 Excellence Awards, and honored members for their service to the local legal profession, the community, and the association. Chaudhary was cited for Mentoring in the Profession as "a dedicated mentor to new attorneys through involvement with community groups, bar association activities, and job shadowing." In March 2021 Chaudhary was invited to testify before a United Nations panel focusing on human rights violations in China.

Political offices
Preceded by Steven G. Novak	Minnesota Senate District 52 (2001-2003); Minnesota Senate District 50 (2003-2011); 2001–2011	Succeeded by Barbara Goodwin
Preceded by Skip Carlson	Minnesota House of Representatives District 52A; 1997–2001	Succeeded by Barbara Goodwin
