= Harry Sieben =

Harry Sieben may refer to:

- Harry A. Sieben (born 1943), American politician and general
- Harry Sieben Sr. (1914–1979), his father, American public servant, active in government and politics in Minnesota
