= Jeannie Hovland =

American government employee

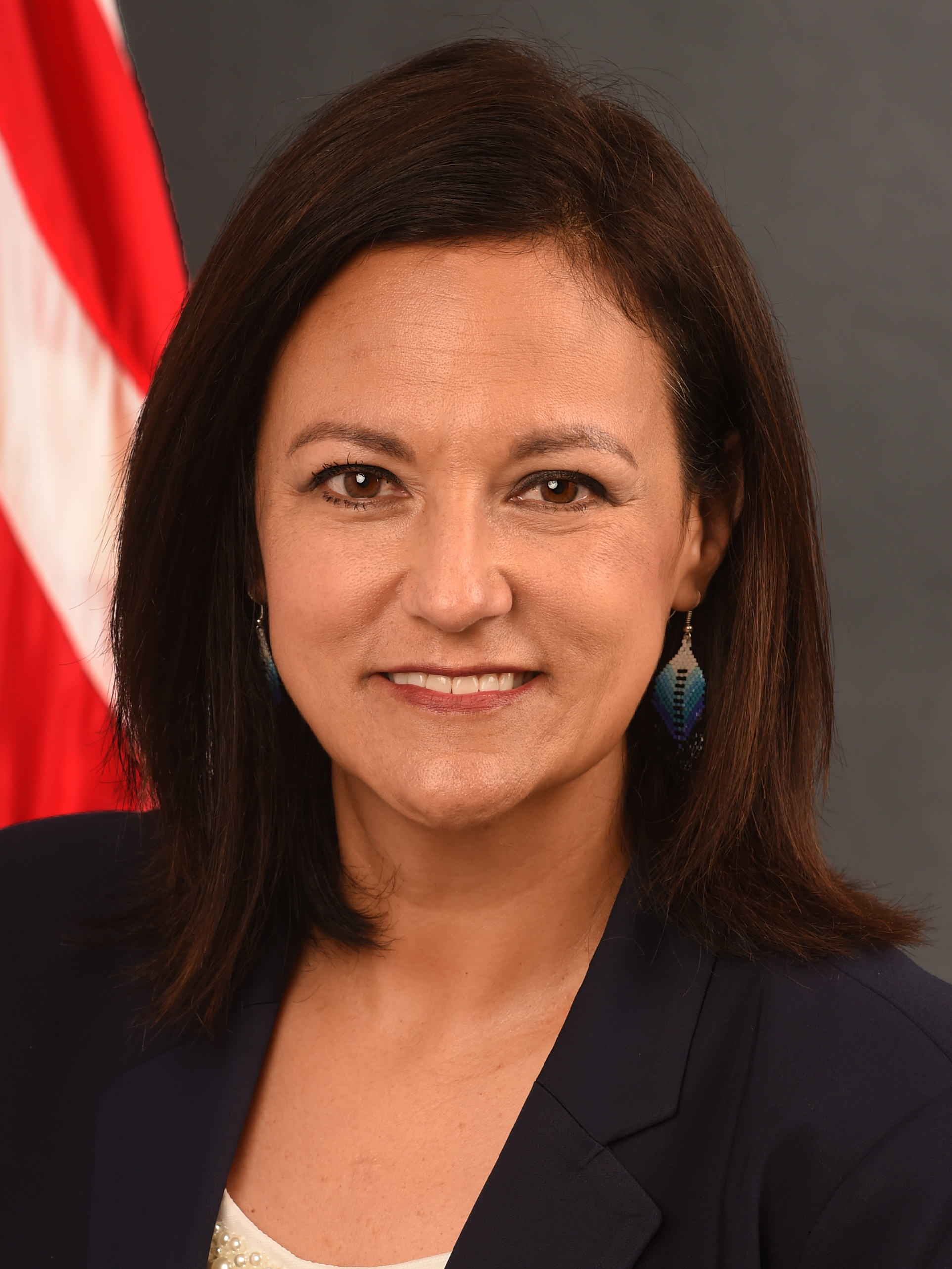

Vice Chair of National Indian Gaming Commission
- Incumbent
- Assumed office January 17, 2021
- President: Joe Biden

Commissioner for the Administration for Native Americans
- In office June 21, 2018 – January 16, 2021
- President: Donald Trump
- Preceded by: Lillian Sparks
- Succeeded by: Patrice Kunesh

Jeannie Hovland is a Santee Dakota Sioux tribal member and an American government official. Hovland serves as the vice chair of the National Indian Gaming Commission and is the director of the Office of Self-Regulation. She was previously the commissioner for the Administration for Native Americans and deputy assistant secretary for Native American affairs.

== Early life and education ==
Hovland is an enrolled member of the Flandreau Santee Sioux Tribe of South Dakota. She attended Associate Schools Inc. Travel Agent School in North Miami Beach, Florida.

== Career ==
Hovland is a Republican, and began her career as the CEO of Wanji Native Nations Consultants. She later worked in the office of U.S. Senator John Thune as a Tribal Affairs Advisor. Hovland went on to serve as senior advisor to the Assistant Secretary for Indian Affairs at the Department of the Interior.

Since August 2021, Hovland has served as vice chair of the National Indian Gaming Commission (NIGC). She served as the OSR Director from May 2021 through July 2023. Hovland began her second three-year term at the agency on May 6, 2024, after first being appointed by the Secretary of the Interior on January 17, 2021. She is one of three commissioners responsible for regulating and ensuring the integrity of the more than 527 Indian gaming facilities, associated with over 250 tribes across 29 states.

Before joining NIGC, Hovland served as Commissioner of the Administration for Native Americans providing oversight of a $57 million annual operating budget to promote self-sufficiency for American Indians, Alaska Natives, Native Hawaiians, and Pacific Islanders. Hovland oversaw discretionary grants that support social and economic development, Native language restoration and revitalization, and environmental regulatory enhancement. Hovland created the Social and Economic Development Strategies for Growing Organizations program, which provides funding to strengthen internal governance structures and build capacity for tribes and tribal organizations. She also served as Deputy Assistant Secretary for Native American Affairs at the Administration for Children and Families (ACF), a $58 billion operating division under the Department of Health and Human Services (HHS). Hovland provided expert and "culturally appropriate" advice to the Assistant Secretary in the formulation of policy, positions, and strategies affecting Native Americans.

Hovland chaired the HHS Secretary’s Intradepartmental Council on Native American Affairs (ICNAA), serving as an advisor to the Secretary, addressing issues of importance to tribal communities through partnerships with all of HHS departments. Hovland helped bring national awareness to the crisis of Missing and Murdered Native American’s through her role on the ICNAA as well as through her participation on the Presidential Taskforce, Operation Lady Justice. Under Hovland’s leadership, as chair of the ACF Native American Affairs Advisory Committee, composed of ACF leadership and in partnership with the ACF Tribal Advisory Committee, the ACF Missing and Murdered Native Americans - A Public Health Framework for Action was published in October 2020.

In her previous role as Senior Advisor to the Assistant Secretary for Indian Affairs at the Department of the Interior, Hovland provided strategic recommendations to the Assistant Secretary on issues related to land leases, access to quality water, land into trust status, and energy and economic development issues.

== See also ==
- List of Native American politicians
- Native American women in politics
