= Denny McNamara =

American politician

Member of the Minnesota House of Representatives from the 54B district 57B (2003–2013)
- In office January 7, 2003 – January 2, 2017
- Preceded by: Sharon Marko
- Succeeded by: Tony Jurgens

Personal details
- Born: September 29, 1952 (age 74) Hastings, Minnesota, U.S.
- Party: Republican
- Spouse: Lynne
- Children: 2
- Education: University of Minnesota Duluth; Carlson School of Business
- Occupation: business owner, landscape contractor

Dennis M. "Denny" McNamara (born September 29, 1952) is a Minnesota politician and former member of the Minnesota House of Representatives. A member of the Republican Party of Minnesota, he represented District 54B, which included portions of Dakota and Washington counties in the southeastern part of the Twin Cities metropolitan area.

== Early life, education, and career ==
McNamara attended Archbishop Brady High School in West Saint Paul, then went on to the University of Minnesota in Duluth for two years. He graduated from the Carlson School of Business at the University of Minnesota in Minneapolis in 1976, earning his B.S. in Business Administration.

McNamara previously owned and operated Hoffman and McNamara Nursery and Landscape in Hastings.

== Minnesota House of Representatives ==
McNamara was elected to the Minnesota House of Representatives in 2002 and was re-elected in 2004, 2006, 2008, 2010, 2012, and 2014. He has served as the ranking member of the House Environment Policy and Oversight Committee, the House Ways and Means Committee, the Environment Policy and Oversight Subcommittee for the Game, Fish and Forestry Division, and the Finance subcommittees for the Environment and Natural Resources Finance Division and the Housing Finance and Policy and Public Health Finance Division. He was a minority whip during the 2007-2008 biennium.

McNamara did not seek re-election in 2016.

== Campaign for Minnesota Senate ==
On November 27, 2017, McNamara announced he would run in the special election for the Minnesota Senate seat vacated by Dan Schoen. He won the Republican nomination in the primary election against James Brunsgaard. He lost the election to former DFL State Representative Karla Bigham and Libertarian candidate Emily Mellingen.
