= Keith Franke =

Keith Franke may refer to:

- Adrian Adonis (Keith A. Franke, Jr., 1954–1988), American professional wrestler
- Keith Franke (politician) (born 1970), former member of the Minnesota House of Representatives

== See also ==
- Keith Frank (born 1972), musician
