= Tony Jurgens =

American politician

Member of the Minnesota House of Representatives from the 54B district
- In office January 3, 2017 – January 3, 2023
- Preceded by: Denny McNamara
- Succeeded by: Shane Hudella

Personal details
- Born: November 28, 1964 (age 61)
- Party: Republican Party of Minnesota
- Spouse: Dawn
- Children: 2
- Education: Southwest Minnesota State University
- Occupation: insurance broker

Tony Jurgens (born November 28, 1964) is an American politician and former member of the Minnesota House of Representatives. A member of the Republican Party of Minnesota, he represented District 54B in the southeastern Twin Cities metropolitan area.

== Early life, education, and career ==
Jurgens was born on November 28, 1964. Jurgens attended Southwest Minnesota State University, graduating with a Bachelor of Science in business administration in 1988.

Jurgens served on the Cottage Grove Economic Development Authority, the Cottage Grove Public Works Commission, Public Services Commission, Charter Commission, Comprehensive Plan Steering Committee and the Washington County Library Board. He is an independent insurance agent.

== Minnesota House of Representatives ==
Jurgens was first elected to the Minnesota House of Representatives in 2016 and re-elected in 2018 and 2020.

== Personal life ==
Jurgens and his wife, Dawn, reside in Cottage Grove, Minnesota. They have two married daughters and two grandchildren. Jurgens is a member of St. Elizabeth Ann Seton Catholic Church in Hastings, Minnesota and a member of the Knights of Columbus.
