= Patrice Kunesh =

American attorney

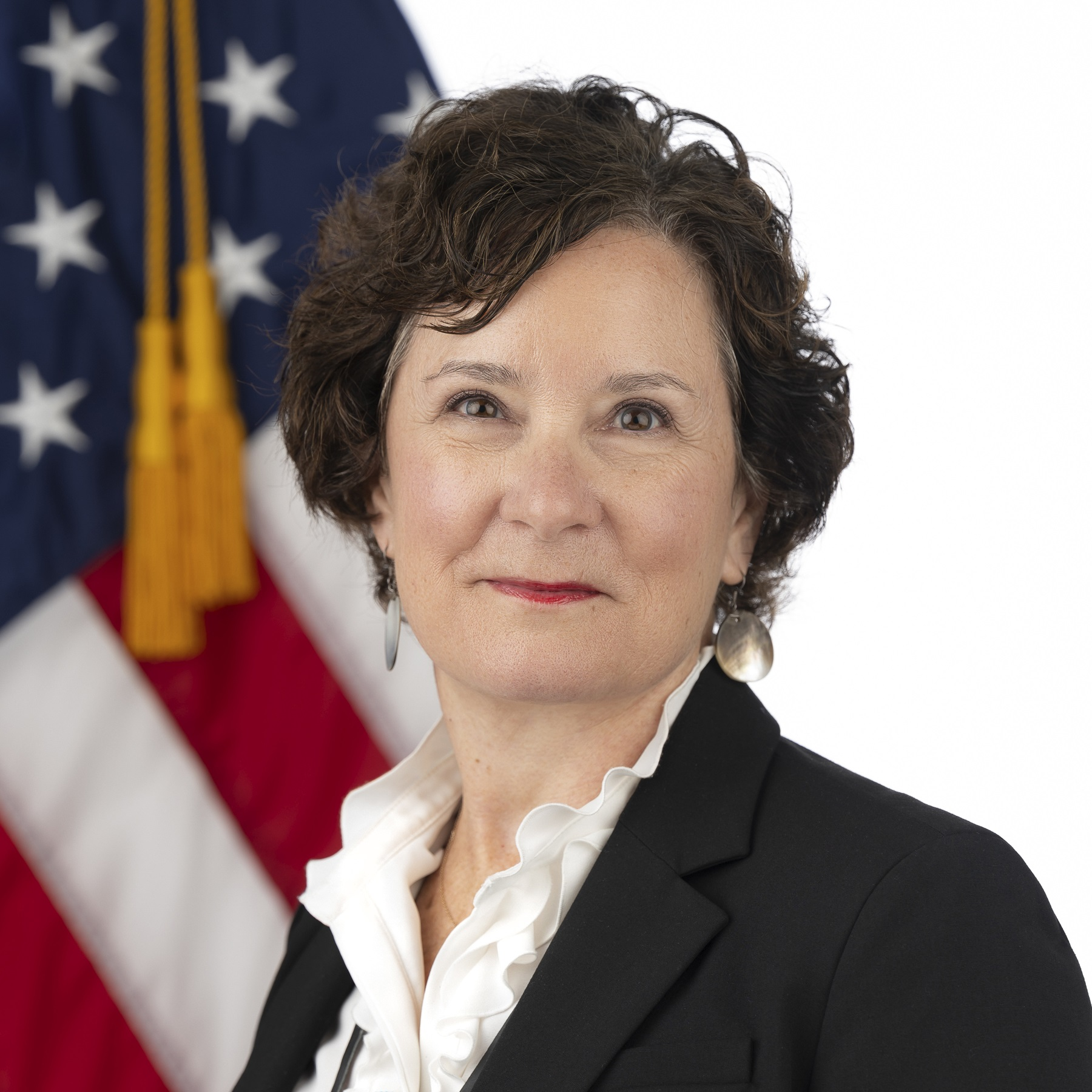

Commissioner of the Administration for Native Americans
- Incumbent
- Assumed office March 8, 2023
- President: Joe Biden
- Preceded by: Jeannie Hovland

Personal details
- Education: Colorado State University (BA); University of Colorado Boulder (JD); Harvard University (MPA)

Patrice H. Kunesh is an American attorney, academic, and government official. Of Standing Rock Lakota descent, Kunesh has served as commissioner of the Administration for Native Americans since March 2023. She is currently the nominee to serve as Chairwoman of the National Indian Gaming Commission.

== Early life and education ==
Kunesh is a Standing Rock Lakota descendant, her mother being an enrolled tribal citizen. She cited her mother and grandfather and inspiring her advocacy for Native Americans.

Kunesh's grandfather, who was born on a reservation in 1903, moved with his mother to Saint Paul, Minnesota. He faced discrimination, ultimately moving to Alaska to find employment. Her father was an attorney who worked in St. Cloud, Minnesota as a county and city attorney.

She earned a Bachelor of Arts degree in French language and literature from Colorado State University, a Juris Doctor from the University of Colorado Law School, and a Master of Public Administration from the Harvard Kennedy School.

== Career ==
From 1989 to 1995, Kunesh worked as a staff attorney for the Native American Rights Fund. From 1994 to 2005, she was legal counsel for the Mashantucket Pequot Tribe in Connecticut. She was a leadership fellow at the Bush Foundation for one year and worked as an associate professor of law at the University of South Dakota School of Law from 2005 to 2011.

=== Government service ===
From 2011 to 2013, she served as deputy solicitor of the United States Department of the Interior. She also served as Deputy Under Secretary for Rural Development at the United States Department of Agriculture.

From 2015 to 2020, she served as director of the Center for Indian Country Development at the Federal Reserve Bank of Minneapolis. Kunesh joined the development team at the Native American Rights Fund in 2020. Kunesh also founded Peȟíŋ Haha Consulting, a social enterprise firm focused on Native economic development.

==== Biden Administration ====
On June 22, 2022, President Joe Biden nominated Kunesh to serve as commissioner for the Administration for Native Americans. On March 8, 2023, the United States Senate confirmed Kunesh to serve as the commissioner of the Administration for Native Americans by a 57–35 vote.

On July 23, 2024, Biden nominated Kunesh to serve as Chairman of the National Indian Gaming Commission. Her nomination has been endorsed by the National Congress of American Indians (NCAI).

== Personal life ==
Her sister, Mary Kunesh, is a member of the Minnesota Senate.
