= Tom Dippel =

American politician

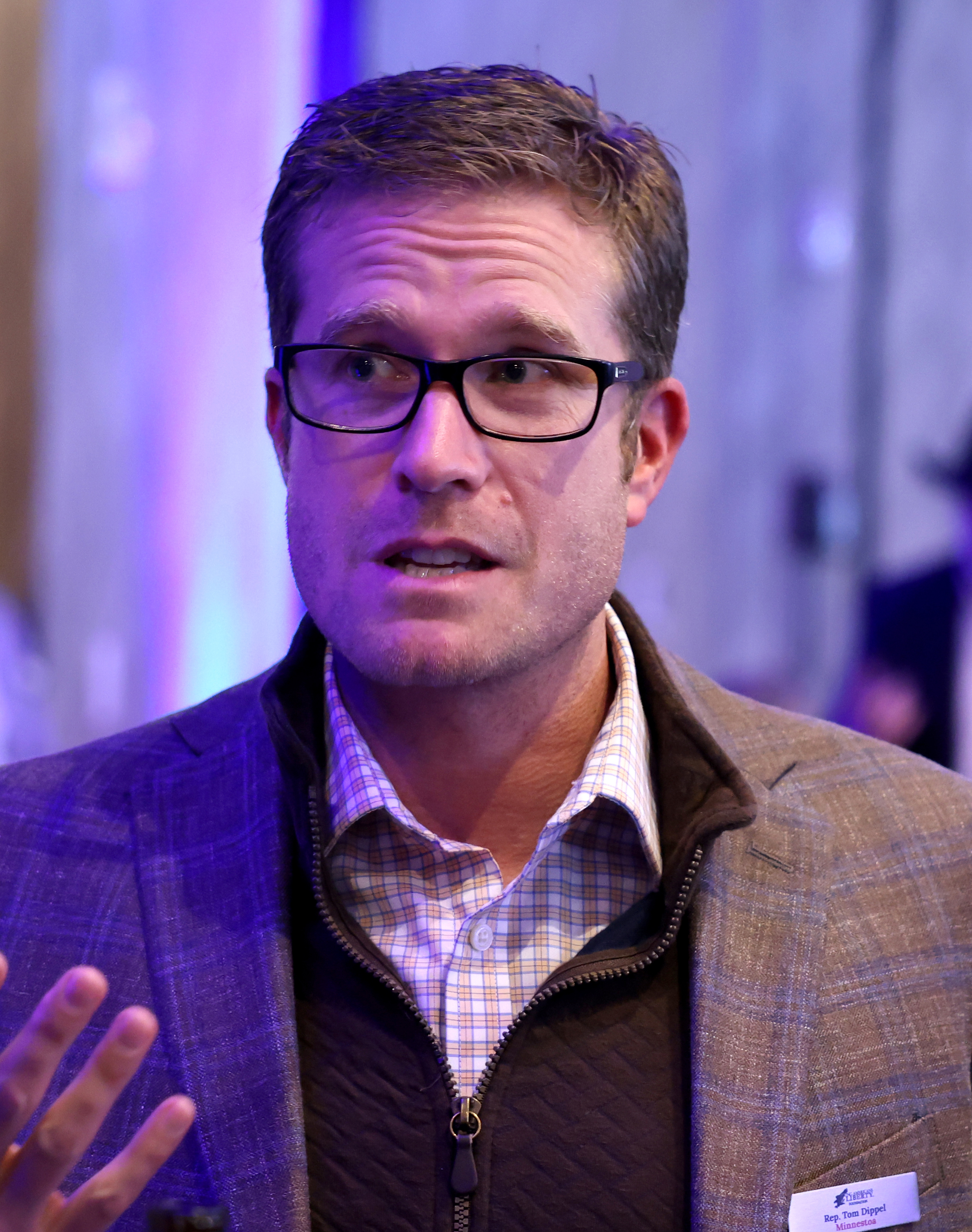
- Dippel at the 2024 Hazlitt Summit hosted by Young Americans for Liberty Foundation

Member of the Minnesota House of Representatives from the 41B district
- Incumbent
- Assumed office January 14, 2025
- Preceded by: Shane Hudella
- Succeeded by: Jen Fox (elect)

Personal details
- Born: May 19, 1982 (age 44)
- Party: Republican

Tom Dippel (born May 19, 1982) is an American politician who represents district 41B in the Minnesota House of Representatives. He is a member of the Republican Party.

== Life and career ==
Dippel attended Park High School. He is a businessman.

In 2024, Dippel defeated Jen Fox in the general election for district 41B of the Minnesota House of Representatives with 51% of the vote. He succeeded Shane Hudella. He assumed office on January 14, 2025.

Dippel did not run for reelection in 2026.
