= Karla Bigham =

American politician (born 1979)

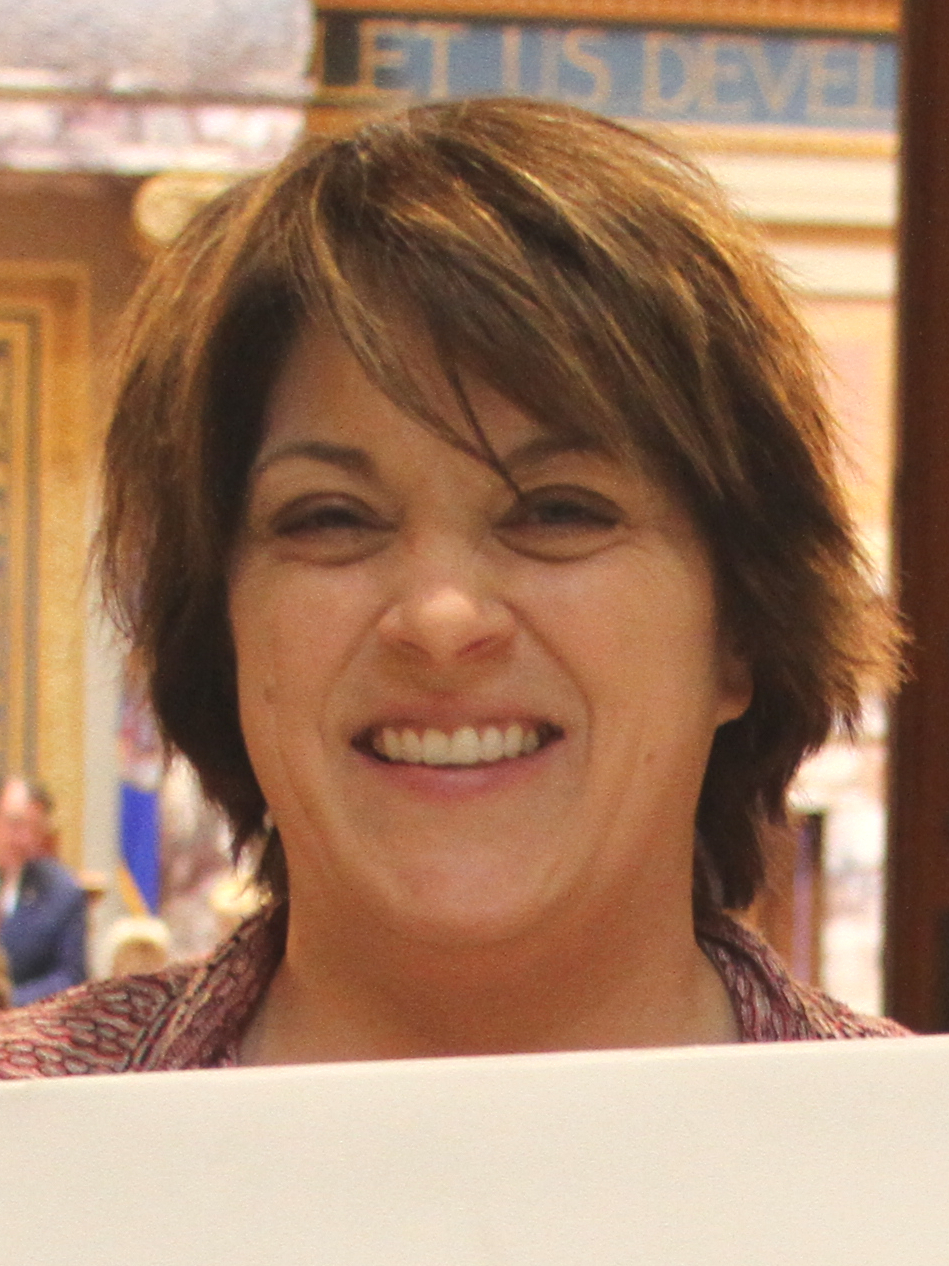
- Bigham in 2022

Member of the Minnesota Senate from the 54th district
- In office February 20, 2018 – January 3, 2023
- Preceded by: Dan Schoen
- Succeeded by: Judy Seeberger

Member of the Minnesota House of Representatives from the 57A district
- In office January 3, 2007 – January 3, 2011
- Preceded by: Katie Sieben
- Succeeded by: John Kriesel

Personal details
- Born: March 9, 1979 (age 47) Newport, Minnesota, U.S.
- Party: Minnesota Democratic–Farmer–Labor Party
- Spouse: John Stechmann
- Education: Winona State University; University of Minnesota
- Occupation: paralegal, union organizer

Karla Bigham (/ˈbɪɡəm/ BIG-əm; born March 9, 1979) is an American politician and current Washington County Commissioner, representing District 4. She is a former member of the Cottage Grove City Council, the Minnesota House of Representatives, and the Minnesota Senate.

== Early life, education, and career ==
Bigham graduated from Park High School in Cottage Grove in 1997. She then went on to Winona State University in Winona, earning a B.S. in paralegal with a sociology and political science minor. She was a member of Delta Phi Epsilon sorority. She has worked as a union organizer and was a paralegal in the Child Protection Division of the Hennepin County Attorney's Office in Minneapolis. She was a member of the Cottage Grove City Council from 2005 to 2007 and also served as chair of the Cottage Grove Public Safety, Health and Welfare Commission. She has worked as a public affairs coordinator for Northern Tier Energy.

== Minnesota House of Representatives ==
Bigham was elected to the Minnesota House of Representatives in 2006, where she represented District 57A, which included portions of Dakota and Washington counties in the southeastern Twin Cities metropolitan area. She was re-elected in 2008. Bigham did not seek re-election to a third term in 2010. She is a member of the Minnesota Democratic–Farmer–Labor Party (DFL).

During her tenure, Bigham served as vice chair of the House Public Safety Policy and Oversight Committee. She also served on the House Environment Policy and Oversight Committee and the Finance subcommittees for the Public Safety Finance Division and the State Government Finance Division.

== Minnesota Senate ==
After Dan Schoen resigned from the Minnesota Senate following allegations of sexual harassment, Bigham announced her intention to run in the special election for the seat. She faced former Republican State Representative Denny McNamara and Libertarian candidate Emily Mellingen. Bigham won the special election.

Senator Bigham won re-election in the 2020 general election, receiving 52.85% of the vote.

For the 2021-2022 Legislative Session, Senator Bigham served on the following committees:

- Ranking Minority Member on the Civil Law and Data Practices Policy
- Judiciary and Public Safety Finance and Policy
- Local Government Policy

== Personal life ==
Karla Bigham is married to John Stechmann and they reside in Cottage Grove, Minnesota.
