= Shelly Christensen =

American politician from Minnesota

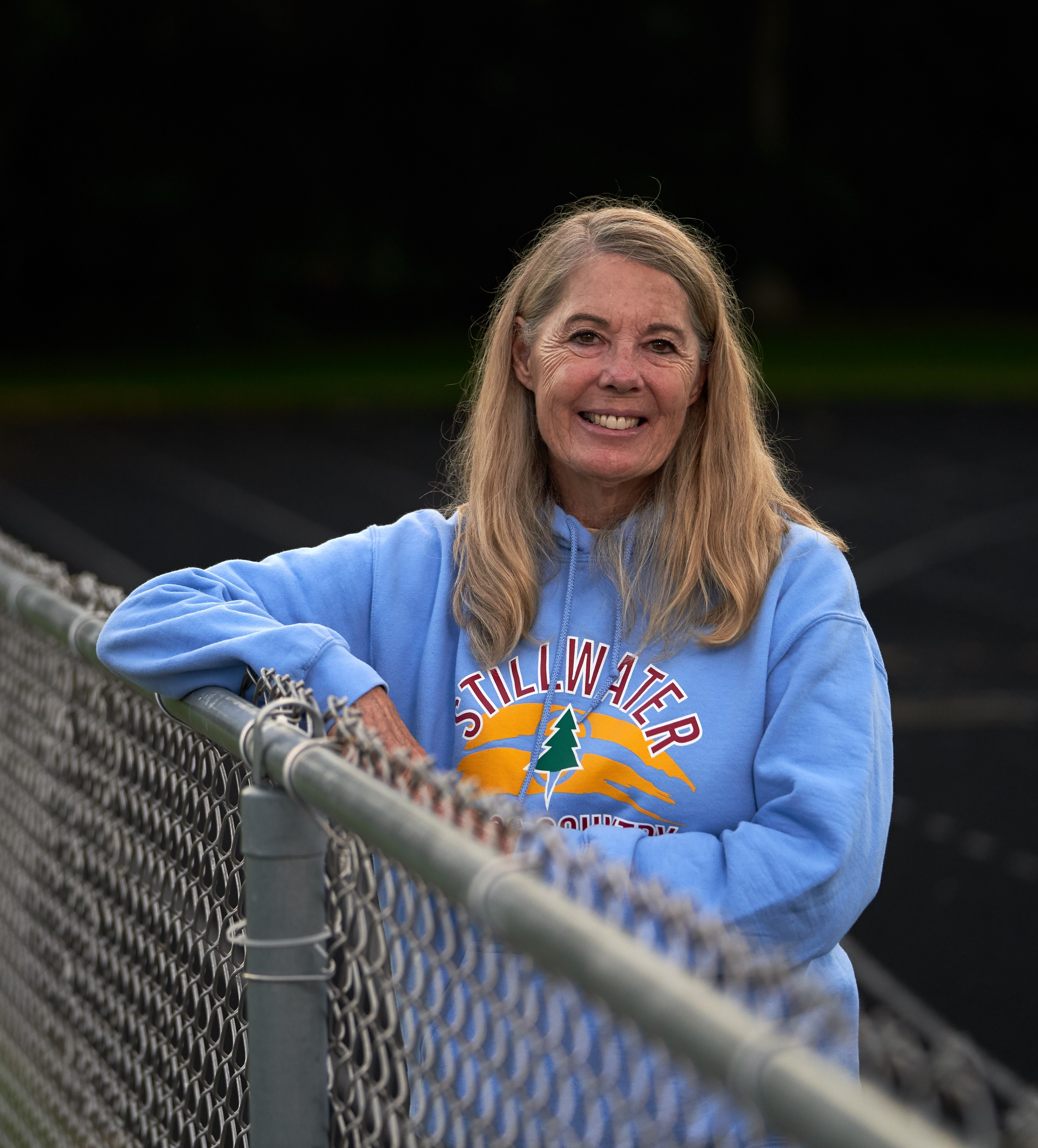
- Christensen on September 3, 2018

Member of the Minnesota House of Representatives from the 39B district
- In office January 8, 2019 – January 3, 2023
- Preceded by: Kathy Lohmer
- Succeeded by: Sandra Feist

Personal details
- Party: Democratic–Farmer–Labor
- Spouse: Scott
- Children: 1
- Education: University of Wisconsin–River Falls (BS); Aspen University (MA)

Michelle "Shelly" Christensen is an American politician and former member of the Minnesota House of Representatives. A member of the Minnesota Democratic–Farmer–Labor Party (DFL), she represented District 39B in the eastern Twin Cities metropolitan area.

== Early life and education ==
Christensen was raised in Marine on St. Croix, Minnesota and graduated from Stillwater Area High School in 1973. She attended the University of Wisconsin–River Falls, graduating with a Bachelor of Science in secondary English and Aspen University, graduating with a Master of Arts in education.

== Career ==
Christensen taught English at Stillwater Area High School and Stillwater Area Junior High for 16 years.

Christensen was first elected to the Minnesota House of Representatives in 2018, defeating Republican incumbent Kathy Lohmer. After serving two terms, she opted against running for reelection in 2022.

== Personal life ==
Christensen and her husband, Scott, have one child. She resides in Stillwater, Minnesota.
