= Shane Hudella =

American politician

Member of the Minnesota House of Representatives from the 41B district
- In office January 3, 2023 – January 14, 2025
- Preceded by: Sandra Feist
- Succeeded by: Tom Dippel

Personal details
- Party: Republican
- Spouse: Jessica
- Children: 4
- Education: University of St. Thomas
- Website: Government website Campaign website

Military service
- Allegiance: Minnesota
- Branch/service: Army National Guard
- Years of service: 1988-2012
- Rank: First Sergeant
- Battles/wars: Operation Desert Storm, 1990

Shane Hudella is an American politician who served in the Minnesota House of Representatives from 2023 to 2025. A member of the Republican Party of Minnesota, Hudella represented District 41B in the southeast Twin Cities metropolitan area, which includes the cities of Hastings and Cottage Grove and parts of Dakota and Washington Counties.

== Early life, education and career ==
Hudella graduated from Hastings High School and attended the University of St. Thomas in Saint Paul, Minnesota.

Hudella joined the Minnesota Army National Guard in 1988, serving until 2012. He was deployed in Operation Desert Storm in Iraq, and reached the rank of First Sergeant.

Hudella founded the organization "United Heroes League", which helps children of military families play hockey, and built a Heroes Monument in Hastings recognizing over 4,000 Minnesota service members.

== Minnesota House of Representatives ==
Hudella was elected to the Minnesota House of Representatives in 2022. He first ran after redistricting and after three-term Republican incumbent Tony Jurgens announced he would run for a seat in the Minnesota Senate.

Hudella served on the Education Finance, Transportation Finance and Policy, and Veterans and Military Affairs Finance and Policy Committees.

In December 2023, Hudella announced he would not seek reelection, citing the difficulty of balancing his position at the legislature with running his nonprofit.

=== Political positions ===
Hudella opposed DFL legislation that would raise taxes in the state, specifically speaking against a bill increasing the sales tax in the Twin Cities metropolitan area to pay for transit.

== Electoral history ==
2022 Minnesota State House - District 41B
Party	Candidate	Votes	%
Republican	Shane Hudella	9,783	51.05
Democratic (DFL)	Tina Folch	9,365	48.87
Write-in		17	0.09
Total votes		19,165	100.0
Republican hold			

== Personal life ==
Hudella lives in Hastings, Minnesota, with his wife, Jessica, and has four children.
