= Mary Kunesh =

American politician

Mary Kelly Kunesh
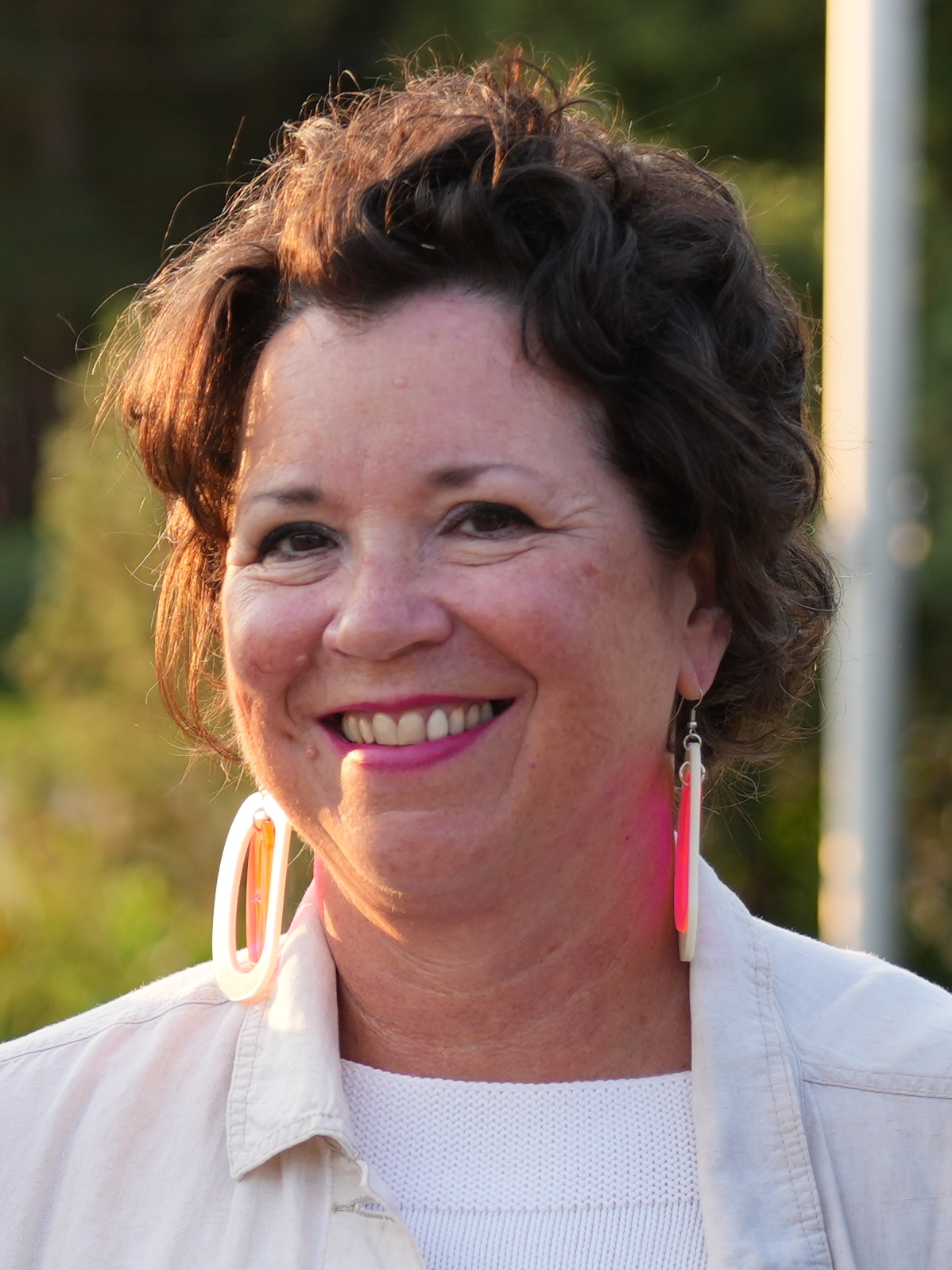
- Kunesh in 2024

Member of the Minnesota Senate from the 39th district
- Incumbent
- Assumed office January 5, 2021
- Preceded by: Carolyn Laine

Member of the Minnesota House of Representatives from the 41B district
- In office January 3, 2017 – January 5, 2021
- Preceded by: Carolyn Laine
- Succeeded by: Sandra Feist

Personal details
- Born: November 20, 1960 (age 65) Saint Paul, Minnesota, U.S.
- Party: Democratic (DFL)
- Spouse: Timothy Podein (divorced)
- Relations: Patrice Kunesh (sister)
- Children: 3
- Education: St. Catherine's University; St. Cloud State University
- Occupation: Politician; Library media specialist

Mary Kelly Kunesh (/ˈkuːnɛʃ/ KOO-nesh; formerly Podein; born November 20, 1960) is an American politician and member of the Minnesota State Senate. A member of the Minnesota Democratic–Farmer–Labor Party (DFL), she represents District 39, which includes parts of Ramsey, Hennepin, and Anoka Counties and the cities of Fridley, Spring Lake Park, Columbia Heights, Hilltop, New Brighton, and St. Anthony.

== Early life, education, and career ==
Kunesh was born as the 9th child of 13 in Saint Paul and raised in Sartell, Minnesota. Her grandfather and mother were enrolled citizens of the Standing Rock Sioux Tribe, and her father was a St. Cloud City Attorney and later an Assistant Stearns County Attorney. Her sister, Patrice Kunesh, is Commissioner of the Administration for Native Americans.

She graduated from Cathedral High School in St. Cloud, Minnesota. She attended St. Catherine University, graduating with a Bachelor of Arts in elementary education in 1995, and St. Cloud State University, graduating with a Master of Arts in information media in 2010.

== Career ==
Kunesh was a member and chair of the New Brighton Parks, Recreation and Environmental Commission and a candidate for the New Brighton City Council in 2013. She worked as a library media specialist for Robbinsdale Area Schools, including Robbinsdale Middle School.

=== Minnesota House of Representatives ===
Kunesh was elected to the Minnesota House of Representatives in 2016, succeeding DFL incumbent Carolyn Laine. In 2017, she was one of four Native American members of the Minnesota Legislature, a descendant of the Standing Rock Lakota tribe. After Laine retired from the Senate in 2020, Kunesh moved her attention from the House to Senate and won the seat.

=== Minnesota State Senate ===
In 2020, Kunesh was elected to the Minnesota State Senate, winning the general election against Lucia Vogel with over 66% of the vote. In 2023 Kunesh was elected Assistant Majority Leader of the state senate. She serves on the following committees:

- Agriculture, Broadband, & Rural Development
- Education Finance - chair
- Education Policy
- Environment, Climate, & Legacy

In 2026, she was the main author of 2026 Minnesota Amendment 1.

== Personal life ==
Kunesh resides in New Brighton, Minnesota. She has three children.

== See also ==
- List of Native American politicians
- Native American women in politics
