= Sandra Feist =

American politician

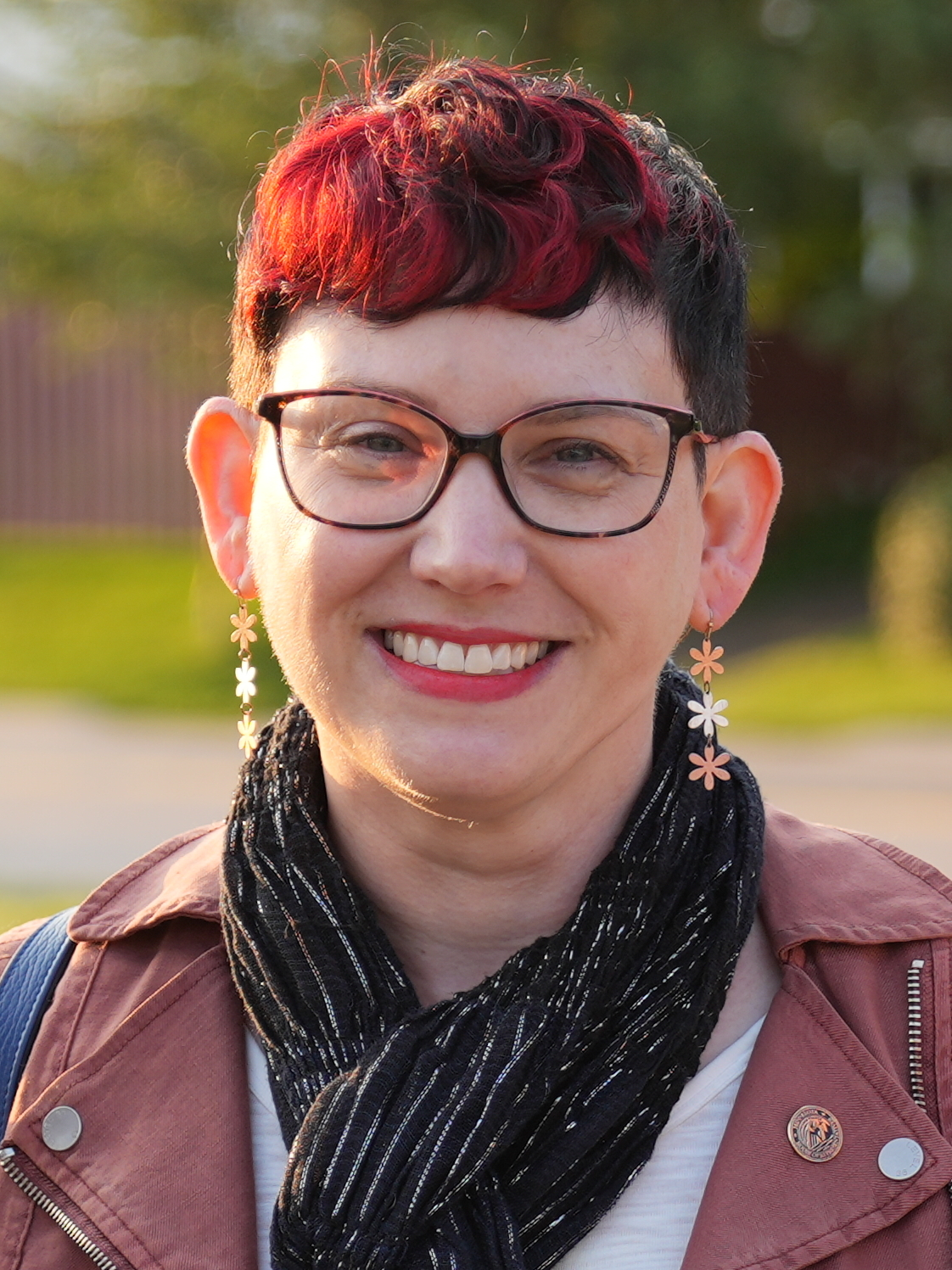

Member of the Minnesota House of Representatives from the 39B district
- Incumbent
- Assumed office January 3, 2023
- Preceded by: Shelly Christensen

Member of the Minnesota House of Representatives from the 41B district
- In office January 5, 2021 - January 3, 2023
- Preceded by: Mary Kunesh-Podein
- Succeeded by: Shane Hudella

Personal details
- Born: Green Bay, Wisconsin, U.S.
- Party: Democratic (DFL)
- Spouse: Ben
- Children: 2
- Education: University of Wisconsin-Madison (B.A.); William Mitchell College of Law (J.D.)
- Occupation: Attorney; Legislator
- Website: Government website Campaign website

Sandra Feist is an American politician serving in the Minnesota House of Representatives since 2021. A member of the Democratic–Farmer–Labor Party, (DFL), Feist represents District 39B (formerly 41B) in the northern Twin Cities metropolitan area, which includes the cities of Columbia Heights and New Brighton, and parts of Anoka, Hennepin, and Ramsey Counties.

== Early life, education and career ==
Feist was born and raised in Wisconsin and attended the University of Wisconsin–Madison, earning a B.A. in history and politics. She subsequently moved to New Orleans, Louisiana to sing jazz. Feist began a career in immigration law, starting as a Case Manager for David Ware & Associates. She is Jewish.

In 2005, while attending Loyola University New Orleans College of Law, Feist was displaced due to Hurricane Katrina. She traveled north to be with family in Minnesota. Feist transferred to William Mitchell College of Law, where she met her husband, Ben. Feist and her husband moved to New Brighton, where she opened a small firm specializing in immigration law in 2010.

Feist has held various leadership positions in the local American Immigration Lawyers Association chapter, including vice chair and chair. In that role, Feist expressed both praise of and disappointment with President Barack Obama's record on immigration reform. She advocated against country limits for employment-based green cards, calling them racist. Feist criticized President Donald Trump's immigration policy and the U.S. Senate's RAISE Act.

== Minnesota House of Representatives ==
Feist was elected to the Minnesota House of Representatives in 2020 and reelected in 2022. She first ran after two-term DFL incumbent Mary Kunesh-Podein announced she would seek election to the Minnesota State Senate.

Feist is the vice chair of the Public Safety Finance and Policy Committee and sits on the Economic Development Finance and Policy, Education Policy, and Judiciary Finance and Civil Law Committees.

=== Public safety ===
Feist authored "The Veterans Restorative Justice Act" to expand access to Veterans Treatment courts in Minnesota. She proposed a bill that would expand state oversight of youth restorative justice programs, saying, "our focus has to be on prevention and intervention". Feist signed on to a letter written by Representative Ilhan Omar asking the Department of Justice to expand its investigation into the Minneapolis Police Department following the murder of George Floyd.

=== Access to menstrual products in schools for boys and girls ===
Feist authored bill HF2750 requiring Minnesota public schools to stock free menstrual products in both girls' and boys' bathrooms used by students in 4th through 12th grade. The bill would be funded by a $2 per-pupil increase for each district's operating capital revenue. The bill passed and became effective on January 1, 2024.

Feist said: "not all students who menstruate are female. We need to make sure all students have access to these products. There are obviously less non-female menstruating students and therefore their usage will be much lower. That was actually calculated into the cost of this."

=== Other political positions ===
Feist also carried the Student Data Privacy Act, which would increase protections for students from disproportionate disciplinary action. She authored a bill to increase funding for homeless shelters in Hennepin County and introduced the Boundary Waters Permanent Protection Bill to expand the state ban on mining and stop a Twin Metals mining proposal.

== Electoral history ==
2020 Minnesota State House – District 41B
Party	Candidate	Votes	%
Democratic (DFL)	Sandra Feist	15,958	70.51
Republican	Ronald Ray Vogel	6,647	29.37
Write-in		26	0.11
Total votes		22,631	100.0
Democratic (DFL) hold			

2022 Minnesota State House – District 39B
Party	Candidate	Votes	%
Democratic (DFL)	Sandra Feist (incumbent)	11,467	69.93
Republican	Mike Sharp	4,915	29.97
Write-in		15	0.09
Total votes		16,397	100.0
Democratic (DFL) hold			

== Personal life ==
Feist lives in New Brighton, Minnesota, with her husband, Ben, and their two children.
