= Jen Fox =

American politician

Member-elect of the Minnesota House of Representatives from the 41B district
- Assuming office January 2027
- Succeeding: Tom Dippel

Personal details
- Party: Democratic (DFL)

Jen Fox is an American politician who is the member-elect for district 41B in the Minnesota House of Representatives. A member of the Minnesota Democratic–Farmer–Labor Party, she was elected in 2026, defeating Republican nominee William Beck. The incumbent, Tom Dippel, did not seek reelection.
