= Carolyn Laine =

American politician (born 1946)

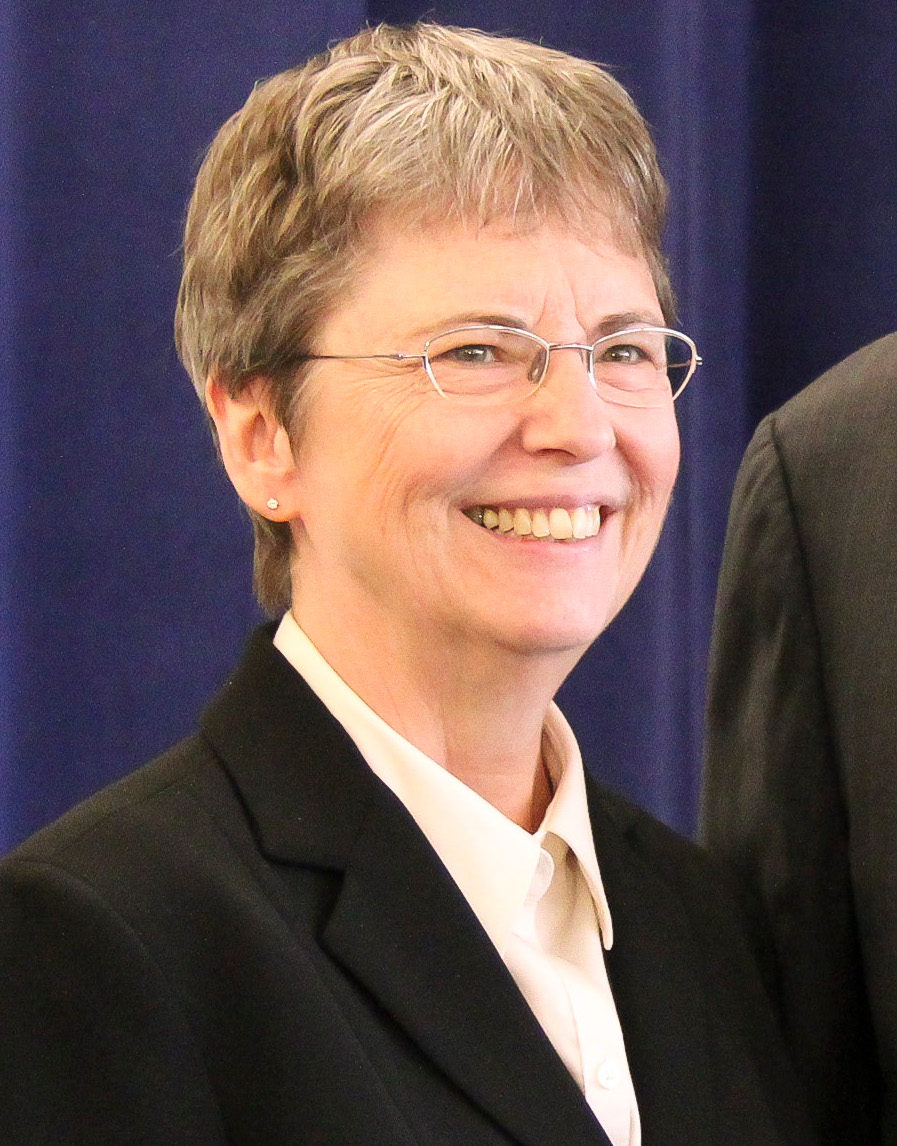

Member of the Minnesota Senate from the 41st district
- In office January 3, 2017 – January 5, 2021
- Preceded by: Barb Goodwin
- Succeeded by: Mary Kunesh-Podein

Member of the Minnesota House of Representatives from the 41B district 50A (2007–2013)
- In office January 3, 2007 – January 2, 2017
- Preceded by: Barb Goodwin
- Succeeded by: Mary Kunesh-Podein

Personal details
- Born: May 22, 1946 (age 80) Hibbing, Minnesota
- Party: Minnesota Democratic–Farmer–Labor Party
- Children: 5
- Education: Hibbing Junior College; University of Minnesota Duluth; St. Mary's University; Saybrook Graduate School
- Occupation: educator

Carolyn D. Laine (born May 22, 1946) is a Minnesota politician and former member of the Minnesota Senate. A member of the Minnesota Democratic–Farmer–Labor Party (DFL), she represented District 41 in the north-central Twin Cities metropolitan area. She also previously represented District 41B in the Minnesota House of Representatives.

== Early life, education, and career ==
Laine attended Hibbing Junior College in Hibbing, then went on to the University of Minnesota in Duluth, receiving her B.S. in Education and Psychology. She later earned her M.A. in Psychology from St. Mary's University, based in Winona. She has done doctoral graduate work in Health Psychology through Saybrook Graduate School and Research Center, based in San Francisco, California.

Laine has worked as a reserve teacher for the Minneapolis Public School System, and as a financial director for the Novalis Institute in Columbia Heights. She served on the Columbia Heights School Board for ten years, and was also a member of the Columbia Heights Charter Commission. She is a former leader of the Parent Communication Network, and a member of the Interfaith Alliance.

== Minnesota Legislature ==
Laine was first elected to the Minnesota House of Representatives in 2006, opting to run after three-term Rep. Barb Goodwin decided not to seek re-election, and was re-elected in 2008, 2010, 2012, and 2014. She was elected to the Minnesota Senate in 2016.

== Personal life ==
Laine's 2016 campaign website listed her religion as Unitarian Universalism. She has 5 children.
