= Anne Claflin =

American politician (born 1983)

Member of the Minnesota House of Representatives from the 54A district
- In office January 8, 2019 – January 2021
- Preceded by: Keith Franke
- Succeeded by: Keith Franke

Personal details
- Born: May 19, 1983 (age 43)
- Party: Democratic–Farmer–Labor
- Spouse: Warren
- Children: 1
- Education: Grinnell College (BA); University of Minnesota (MS)
- Occupation: scientist

Anne Claflin (born May 19, 1983) is an American politician and former member of the Minnesota House of Representatives. A member of the Minnesota Democratic–Farmer–Labor Party (DFL), she represented District 54A in the southeastern Twin Cities metropolitan area from 2019 through 2021. She has served as a member of the South St. Paul school board since 2023.

== Early life, education, and career ==
Claflin graduated from South Saint Paul Secondary. She attended Grinnell College, graduating with a Bachelor of Arts in Russian and biology, and the University of Minnesota, graduating with a Master of Science in science, technology, and environmental policy from the Humphrey School of Public Affairs.

Claflin is a research scientist at the Minnesota Pollution Control Agency.

== Minnesota House of Representatives ==
Claflin was elected to the Minnesota House of Representatives in 2018, defeating Republican incumbent Keith Franke.

== Personal life ==
Claflin and her husband, Warren, have one child. She resides in South St. Paul, Minnesota.
