= Harry Sieben Sr. =

American public servant (1914-1979)

Harry A. Sieben Sr.

Chief Clerk, United States District Court for the District of Minnesota
- In office 1971–1979

Regional Director, Small Business Administration, Great Lakes region
- In office 1962–c.1968
- Appointed by: John F. Kennedy

United States Marshal, Minnesota
- In office 1961–1962
- Appointed by: John F. Kennedy
- Preceded by: Enard Erickson
- Succeeded by: Ray Hemenway

Personal details
- Born: August 23, 1914 Hastings, Minnesota
- Died: April 25, 1979 (aged 64) Hastings, Minnesota
- Party: Democratic–Farmer–Labor Party
- Relations: James Sieben (brother); Harry A. Sieben (son); Mike Sieben (son); Katie Sieben (granddaughter)
- Education: University of Minnesota; William Mitchell College of Law

Harry Albert Sieben II (August 23, 1914 - April 25, 1979) was an American public servant, active in government and politics in Minnesota throughout his life.

== Family, early life, and education ==
Sieben was born on August 23, 1914, in Hastings, Minnesota into a family active in government and politics.

Sieben's father, also named Harry Albert Sieben (1890-1945), a 1911 graduate of the University of Illinois, served as mayor of Hastings from 1922 to 1926. Sieben's grandfather, J. George Sieben, served three terms as mayor of Hastings, while also serving on the city council for twelve years.

Sieben's mother, Irene H. Buckley Sieben (1891-1982), was a 1911 graduate of the University of Minnesota and was a delegate to the Democratic National Convention in 1948.

The Sieben family originally arrived in the United States from Firmenich, near Cologne, Germany, in the then-Kingdom of Prussia, in 1847.

Sieben graduated from the University of Minnesota in 1937 and, later, from William Mitchell College of Law.

== Early career ==
Before his career in law and government, Sieben managed his family's drug store, which was founded by his grandfather in 1885.

In 1940, Sieben registered for the draft at age 26. Sieben registered as 5'8'', 180 pounds, with blue eyes, and brown hair. During World War II, Sieben joined the Army and served at the bomber modification center at Holman Field in St. Paul. Sieben served from 1942-1943, reaching the rank of Corporal.

Sieben married his wife, the former Mary Luger, in April 1940, in Minneapolis, where they later made their home before moving to Hastings.

== Political career ==
Sieben was a long-time member of the Minnesota Democratic–Farmer–Labor Party (DFL) and active in local and state politics for over thirty years.

After assisting with the political activity of his father in Hastings, an early political experience of Sieben's came during Hubert Humphrey's successful 1948 bid for US Senate.

In 1950, Sieben ran for Minnesota's 2nd Congressional District of the US Congress, against incumbent-since-1941, Joseph O'Hara. Sieben supported the Marshall Plan and providing military assistance to Europe and Asia, including Korea, where his brother James G. Sieben served. Sieben ultimately lost 69,304 to 46,452.

In February 1951, he was also appointed acting director of the Office of Price Stabilization in Minnesota after being recommended for it by then-Senator Hubert Humphrey.

In 1954, Sieben again ran for US Congress in the 2nd District. In September 1954, Sieben won the DFL primary with 59% of the votes, or nearly 17K tallies. A highlight of Sieben's campaign was a fundraising dinner for 700 people in Mankato with sitting Senator Hubert Humphrey at $5 per plate. In the November 1954 general election, Sieben garnered 42% of the vote, losing again to Rep. O'Hara.

In January 1955, Minnesota Governor Orville Freeman appointed Sieben as liquor control commissioner. In 1957, Governor Freeman appointed Sieben as the Minnesota highway safety director, a role in which he served for four years.

Sieben was appointed as US Marshal for Minnesota by President John F. Kennedy on May 1, 1961.

Sieben stepped down from US Marshal position in the summer of 1962 to become the regional director of the Small Business Administration for Minnesota, North and South Dakota, and northern Wisconsin. During this time, Sieben was also a confidante of Governor Karl Rolvaag.

In 1966, at the age of 52, he graduated from William Mitchell College of Law and worked as a lawyer. In 1968, Sieben was elected president of the Twin Cities chapter of the Federal Bar Association.

From 1971 until his death, Sieben served as chief clerk of the United States District Court for the District of Minnesota.

== Death & legacy ==
On April 22, 1979, Sieben he suffered a stroke or a heart attack and was hospitalized. He died shortly afterwards on April 25, 1979, in Hastings.
