= Barb Goodwin =

American politician

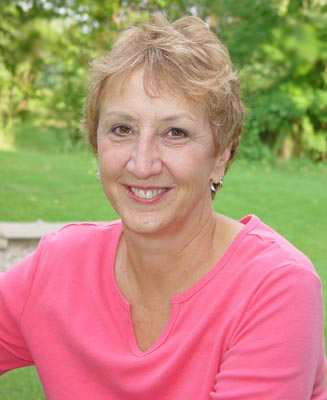

Member of the Minnesota Senate from the 41st district 50th (2011–2013)
- In office January 4, 2011 – January 2, 2017
- Preceded by: Satveer Chaudhary
- Succeeded by: Carolyn Laine

Member of the Minnesota House of Representatives from the 50A district 52A (2001–2003)
- In office January 3, 2001 – January 2, 2007
- Preceded by: Satveer Chaudhary
- Succeeded by: Carolyn Laine

Personal details
- Born: January 25, 1949 (age 77) Minneapolis, Minnesota
- Party: Minnesota Democratic–Farmer–Labor Party
- Spouse(s): David (m. 1970), Bill Heaney 2018
- Children: 2
- Education: North Hennepin Community College; Hamline University; Humphrey Institute

Barbara J. Goodwin (born January 25, 1949) is a Minnesota politician and former member of the Minnesota Senate. A member of the Minnesota Democratic–Farmer–Labor Party (DFL), she represented District 41, which included portions of Anoka, Hennepin, and Ramsey counties in the northern Twin Cities metropolitan area.

== Early life, education, and career ==
Goodwin attended North Hennepin Community College in Brooklyn Park, Minnesota, then went on to Hamline University in St. Paul, Minnesota, receiving her B.A. with numerous honors in Sociology and Political Science.

Goodwin served on the Columbia Heights School Board from November 2009 until becoming a member of the Senate, and has also served as an adjunct professor at the Hamline University Graduate School of Business in Saint Paul from 2008 until 2010, teaching legislative practice and government contracting.

== Minnesota Legislature ==
On June 1, 2010, Goodwin filed as a DFL candidate for the Minnesota Senate representing District 50. The district includes the cities of Arden Hills, Columbia Heights, Fridley, Hilltop, New Brighton, Shoreview and St. Anthony and is divided between Anoka and Ramsey Counties. On June 28, 2010, the district committee voted to revoke the endorsement from embattled incumbent Senator Satveer Chaudhary and grant it to her. She defeated Chaudhary in the August 10, 2010, DFL Primary, garnering 70% of the vote to Chaudhary's 30%. She subsequently won the November 2, 2010, General Election, garnering 52% to Republican Gina Bauman's 41% and Independent Rae Hart Anderson's 6%. Goodwin retired in January 2017.

Goodwin was re-elected to District 41 in 2012, receiving 62.82% of the vote and defeating Republican candidate Gina Bauman.

Goodwin previously served as a member of the Minnesota House of Representatives from 2001 to 2007. While in the House and Senate she specialized in state budget issues, consumer protections, homeowner construction and repair protections, jobs, education, health care and business and labor issues. She also supported expanded transit options.

Her special legislative concerns in the House and Senate included jobs, budget, child, adult, and worker protections and rights, anti-bullying, judicial reforms, and physical and mental healthcare. While in the Senate, she served as Vice Chair of Judiciary Committee.

Prior to running for election, Goodwin was Director of Legislative Central Staff and a Research Analyst in the MN House DFL for 10 years.

In the 4 years between serving in the House and Senate, Goodwin was an adjunct instructor at Hamline Graduate School where she taught Legislative Practice and Government Contracting. She also served on the Columbia Heights School Board.

Goodwin did not seek re-election to the MN Senate in 2016 and retired in Jan. 2017. She and Bill currently live in Minneapolis and AZ.

== Personal ==
Goodwin lived in Columbia Heights from 1991 - 2020. She was born in NE Mpls. She has two adult children. Her son, Anthony David Goodwin is married to Katie Lucas. Her daughter is Heather Jo Bronder. She also has a grandson Liam David Bronder. Former spouse was David Goodwin married from 1970 to 2014. She married Bill Heaney, formerly of Duluth, in 2018.
