= MASWCD =

US nonprofit organization

MASWCD, or Minnesota Association of Soil and Water Conservation Districts, is a nonprofit organization which exists to provide leadership and a common voice for Minnesota's Conservation districts and to maintain a positive, results-oriented relationship with rule making agencies, partners and legislators; expanding education opportunities for the districts so they may carry out effective conservation programs.

MASWCD consists of member Conservation districts from around the state of Minnesota and provides training seminars for staff and supervisors alike in member Conservation districts as well as a yearly convention, the MASWCD Annual meeting and trade show.

Member Conservation district's are split by geography into eight areas: NW Area 1, WC Area 2, NE Area 3, Metro Area 4, SW Area 5, SC Area 6, SE Area 7, NC Area 8.
