= Dan Schoen =

American politician

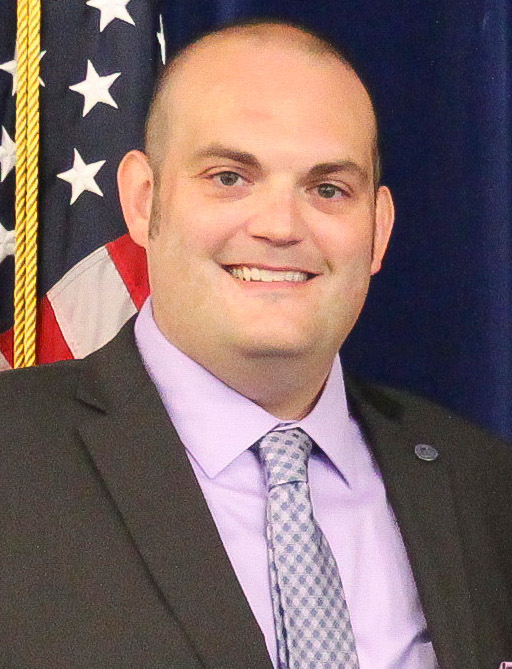

Member of the Minnesota Senate from the 54th district
- In office January 3, 2017 – December 15, 2017
- Preceded by: Katie Sieben
- Succeeded by: Karla Bigham

Member of the Minnesota House of Representatives from the 54A district
- In office January 8, 2013 – January 2, 2017
- Preceded by: John Kriesel (District 57A)
- Succeeded by: Keith Franke

Personal details
- Born: December 7, 1974 (age 51)
- Party: Minnesota Democratic–Farmer–Labor Party
- Children: 2
- Education: Ridgewater College (A.A.); Minneapolis Community and Technical College (A.A.)
- Occupation: police officer, paramedic

Dan Schoen (born December 7, 1974) is an American politician and former member of the Minnesota Senate. A member of the Minnesota Democratic–Farmer–Labor Party (DFL), he represented District 54 in the southeastern Twin Cities metropolitan area. He is also a former member of the Minnesota House of Representatives, where he represented District 54A.

== Early life, education, and career ==
Schoen graduated from MACCRAY High School in 1993. He attended St. John's University in Collegeville and Minneapolis Community and Technical College, where he graduated from the Paramedic program. He attended Ridgewater College in Willmar, Minnesota, graduating with an A.A. in Law Enforcement. He is a Police officer and Paramedic.

== Minnesota Legislature ==
Schoen was first elected to the Minnesota House of Representatives in 2012 and was re-elected in 2014. After Katie Sieben announced she would not seek re-election to the Minnesota Senate, Schoen announced his intentions to run. He went on to win in the 2016 election. Schoen resigned from the Senate on December 15, 2017, following a sexual harassment scandal.

== Sexual harassment allegations ==
On November 8, 2017, MinnPost published an online story in which three women, including state Rep. Erin Maye Quade, accused Schoen of sexually harassing them. In response, Schoen said that the allegations were false or taken out of context. Political leaders from both parties called for Schoen to resign, including Governor Mark Dayton, Democratic-Farmer-Labor Party Chairman Ken Martin, Senate Majority Leader Paul Gazelka, and Senate Minority Leader Tom Bakk.

On November 14, 2017, a Minnesota Senate staff member, Ellen Anderson, alleged that Schoen had sent her an unsolicited photo of male genitalia via Snapchat in 2015.

After initially denying the incidents, but concluding he could no longer serve his district effectively, Schoen resigned on December 15, 2017.

== Personal life ==
Schoen has two children and resides in St. Paul Park, Minnesota.
