= Anoka Conservation District =

Government entity in Anoka County, Minnesota

Anoka Conservation District is a government entity that provides technical assistance and tools to manage and protect land and water resources in Anoka County, Minnesota.

It currently consists of 8 staff and 5 elected supervisors.

The Board are elected at large on staggered 4 year terms with 3 members or 2 members up for election every 2 years. Currently the following people serve on the Board of Supervisors for Anoka Conservation District.

District 1 (Bethel, St. Francis, Nowthen, Oak Grove): Steve Laitinen District 2 (Ramsey, Anoka, Andover): Jim Lindahl District 3 (Coon Rapids, Spring Lake Park, Fridley, Columbia Heights): Glenda Meixell District 4 (Ham Lake, Blaine, Circle Pines, Lino Lakes, Centerville): Mary Jo Truchon District 5 (East Bethel, Linwood Township, Columbus): Sharon LeMay
