= Keith Franke (politician) =

American politician

Member of the Minnesota House of Representatives from the 54A district
- In office January 5, 2021 – January 2, 2023
- Preceded by: Anne Claflin
- In office January 3, 2017 – January 7, 2019
- Preceded by: Dan Schoen
- Succeeded by: Anne Claflin

Personal details
- Born: November 13, 1970 (age 55)
- Party: Republican Party of Minnesota
- Children: 2
- Education: Saint Paul College; Hamline University
- Occupation: small business owner

Keith Franke (born November 13, 1970) is an American politician and former member of the Minnesota House of Representatives. A member of the Republican Party of Minnesota, he represented District 54A in the southeastern Twin Cities metropolitan area.

https://www.namehim.io/

== Early life, education, and career ==
Franke was born on November 13, 1970. He attended Saint Paul College, graduating with a certificate in restaurant and bar management, and Hamline University, graduating with a certificate in economic development.

Franke was mayor of St. Paul Park, Minnesota from 2012 to 2016. He was a member of the South Washington County Cable Commission, the Red Rock Corridor Commission, and chaired the St. Paul Park Economic Development Authority.

Franke owns Park Cafe and Franke's Corner Bar in St. Paul Park.

== Minnesota House of Representatives ==
Franke was first elected to the Minnesota House of Representatives in 2016. He lost his bid for reelection in 2018 to DFL challenger Anne Claflin, however, Franke won a rematch in 2020. He then decided to leave the House in 2022, running unsuccessfully for Washington County Commissioner.

== Personal life ==
Franke resides in St. Paul Park, Minnesota. He has two daughters.

Franke is a recovering substance addict and has been sober since 1998.
