= John Kriesel =

American politician

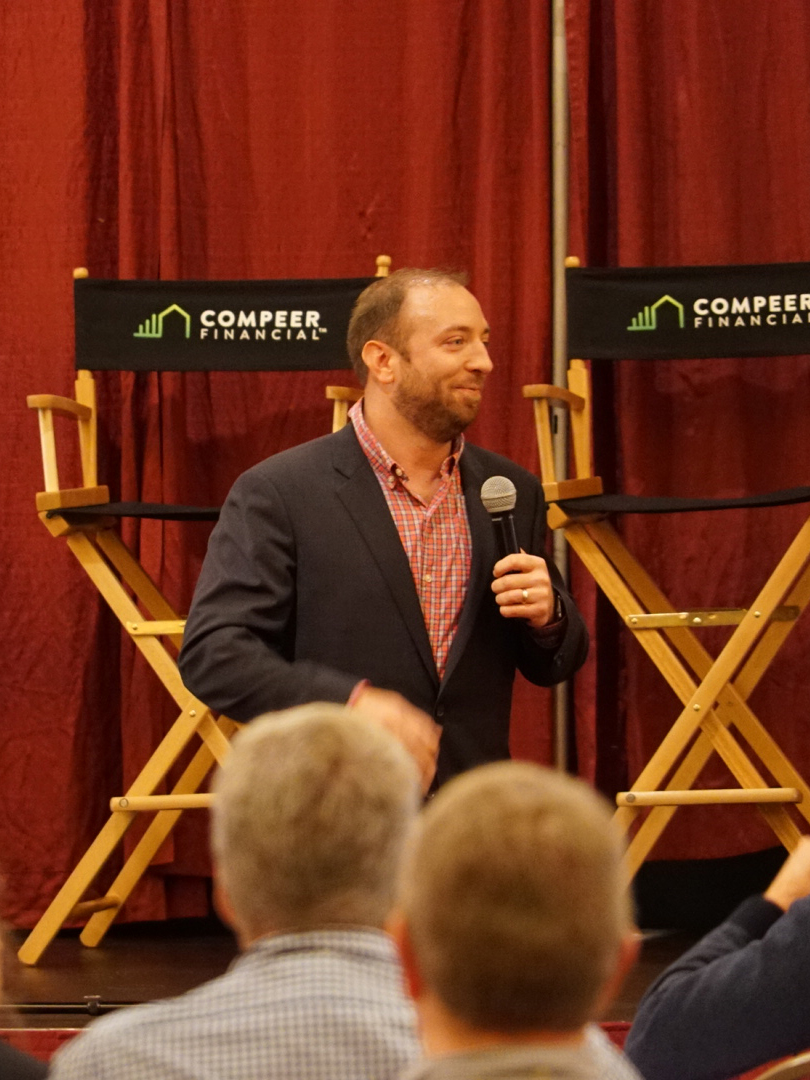

Member of the Minnesota House of Representatives from the 57A district
- In office January 4, 2011 – January 7, 2013
- Preceded by: Karla Bigham
- Succeeded by: district redrawn

Personal details
- Born: October 7, 1981 (age 44) Hibbing, Minnesota
- Party: Republican Party of Minnesota
- Spouse: Kayla Kriesel
- Children: 1
- Education: Metropolitan State University (B.A.)
- Profession: Veteran Services Director, motivational speaker, contractor, radio show contributor, legislator, veteran

John M. Kriesel (born October 7, 1981) is a Minnesota politician and former member of the Minnesota House of Representatives who represented District 57A, which includes portions of Dakota and Washington counties in the southeastern part of the Twin Cities metropolitan area. A Republican, he is a motivational speaker, veteran service officer, and a contributor on KFXN-FM radio during the "Power Trip Morning Show."

Kriesel was elected to the House in 2010. He served on the Capital Investment, the Judiciary Policy and Finance, and the Public Safety and Crime Prevention Policy and Finance committees, and as vice chair of the State Government Finance Subcommittee for the Veterans Services Division. On May 21, 2011, he was one of four Republicans who dissented against the caucus majority by voting against sending a constitutional ban on same-sex marriage to a 2012 referendum; the bill passed, 70–62.

Kriesel served in the Minnesota Army National Guard from 1998 to 2008, rising to the level of staff sergeant. He was stationed in Kosovo in 2004 as part of a NATO peacekeeping force and, later, at Camp Fallujah in Iraq. He lost both of his legs in military combat in 2006 in an encounter with an IED, or roadside bomb. He now has prosthetic legs. He was awarded the Combat Infantryman Badge, the Purple Heart Medal, and the Bronze Star Medal for his service to his country. He worked as an intern in U.S. Senator Norm Coleman's Washington D.C. office in 2007, addressing constituent concerns and military issues. He also co-authored, with writer Jim Kosmo, Still Standing, an autobiography that details his military career, recovery from his combat injuries and life since.

Since leaving the Legislature, Kriesel has served as director of veteran services for Anoka County.
