= Harry A. Sieben =

American politician (born 1943)

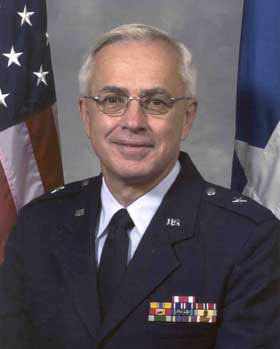
- Sieben in 2007

49th Speaker of the Minnesota House of Representatives
- In office January 1981 – January 1985
- Preceded by: Fred C. Norton
- Succeeded by: David M. Jennings

Acting Adjutant General of Minnesota
- In office August 2003 – November 2003
- Preceded by: Eugene R. Andreotti
- Succeeded by: Larry W. Shellito

Member of the Minnesota House of Representatives
- In office January 1971 – January 1985

Minnesota House Majority Leader
- In office 1984–1985
- Preceded by: Willis R. Eken
- Succeeded by: Connie Levi

Personal details
- Born: November 24, 1943 (age 82) Hastings, Minnesota
- Party: DFL
- Relations: Harry Sieben Sr. (father); James Sieben (uncle); Mike Sieben (brother); Katie Sieben (niece)
- Children: 4
- Education: Winona State College (BA); University of Minnesota (JD)

Harry A. "Tex" Sieben, Jr. (born November 24, 1943) is an American attorney and general who served in senior positions in the Legislature and National Guard of the state of Minnesota.

Sieben served fourteen years in the House, including four years as the Speaker.

Sieben's military career spanned 35 years of active, reserve, and National Guard duty, culminating with a period of service as acting Adjutant General of Minnesota, the highest-ranking officer of the Minnesota National Guard. Sieben retired as a two-star, major general.

== Early life and education ==
Sieben was born in 1943 in Hastings, Minnesota to a family active in both government and military service. Sieben's grandfather and great-grandfather served as mayor of Hastings, while his uncle, James Sieben, served in the military during World War II and the Korean War, and retired as a lieutenant general and Adjutant General of the Minnesota National Guard, a position held in 1975-1988.

Sieben attended Hastings High School and later earned his B.A. from Winona State College (now Winona State University) in 1965. Sieben entered the University of Minnesota Law School, and in 1968, earned his Juris Doctor.

== Legislative career ==
Sieben was first elected to the Minnesota House in 1970 by beating a 16-year incumbent. Sieben's legislative career spanned seven legislative sessions over 14 years, including four years as Speaker of the House (1981-1985) and a brief period as Majority Leader (1984-1985).

During his tenure, Sieben represented portions of Dakota and Washington counties (1973-1985), and briefly, a portion of Goodhue county (1971-1972). At various points, Sieben served on committees related to Rules and Legislative Administration, Taxes (Chair), and Government Operations (Chair), amongst others.

Sieben initially was a member of the Liberal Caucus in the officially non-partisan legislature, and served as a Democrat when political parties were recognized in the legislature in 1975.

== Military career ==
In 1968, Sieben joined the United States Army in the Military Intelligence Branch. He completed basic and advanced training at Fort Dix, New Jersey, and Fort Devens, Massachusetts.

From 1969 to 1975, Sieben was stationed at Fort Snelling, Minnesota. During this period, Sieben worked as a Morse code intercept operator and platoon leader in the Army Security Agency (ASA), the Army's signals intelligence branch.

He then received a direct commission into the Minnesota Air National Guard in April 1975. He served in the Judge Advocate General's Corps for the 133rd Airlift Wing, 148th Fighter Wing, and Headquarters Minnesota Air National Guard. In 1990, he was appointed as the state judge advocate for the Minnesota National Guard.

In 1997, he was promoted to Assistant Adjutant General in the Minnesota Air National Guard based in St. Paul. In this position, Sieben was responsible for liaison with senior leadership at higher headquarters, coordination with state and federal agencies, direction of long range planning, coordination of real estate matters, and implementation of plans and programs.

In October 1998, Sieben was promoted to brigadier general at National Guard state headquarters in St. Paul. Major General and Adjutant General Eugene Andreotti, and Sieben's uncle and former Adjutant General James Sieben, pinned the stars on Sieben's shoulders at the ceremony.

In August 2003, Governor Tim Pawlenty appointed General Sieben, then 59, as the acting Adjutant General of Minnesota, the state's top-ranking officer. During Sieben's tenure, he was responsible for the 12,500 men and women of the Minnesota National Guard. While Sieben was acting Adjutant, about one-fourth of the state's total force was activated, or soon to be activated, including service in places to include Iraq, Bosnia, and Kosovo.

After retiring from the military, Sieben was invested as Civilian Aide to the Secretary of the Army for Minnesota in October 2006 at the Pentagon by Secretary of the Army Francis Harvey.

Sieben's awards and decorations include a Meritorious Service Medal, Air Force Commendation Medal, Air Force Outstanding Unit Award, Air Force Organizational Excellence Award, and Small Arms Expert Marksmanship Ribbon. Sieben also received the Minnesota Superior Volunteer Service Award.

Dates of Rank
| Insignia | Rank | Date |
|---|---|---|
| | 2LT | May 1969 |
| | 1LT | May 1971 |
| | CPT | April 1975 |
| | MAJ | June 1979 |
| | LTC | June 1984 |
| | COL | June 1988 |
| | BG | October 1998 |
| | MG | 2003 |

== Legal career and other work ==
Sieben was also a career trial attorney, practicing law in Minnesota for over 50 years. After joining SiebenCarey in 1969, he served as managing partner from 1983-2007, helping build one of Minnesota's largest personal injury law firms.

Sieben also served on the Board of Directors of the Civilian Marksmanship Program for 24 years, including service as Secretary and Vice-Chair of the Board. Sieben also served on the Boards of the Regina Medical Center and Starbase Minnesota.

Sieben was nominated to serve on the Board of Regents of the University of Minnesota in 1997.

== Personal life ==
Sieben is married to wife Virginia and has two children and two stepchildren. Both his brother, Mike Sieben, and niece, Katie Sieben, have also served in the Minnesota State Legislature.

Political offices
| Preceded by Fred C. Norton | Speaker of the Minnesota House of Representatives; 1981–1985 | Succeeded by David M. Jennings |
| Preceded by Willis R. Eken | Minnesota House Majority Leader; 1981–1985 | Succeeded by David M. Jennings |
