= National Indian Gaming Commission =

United States gambling regulatory agency

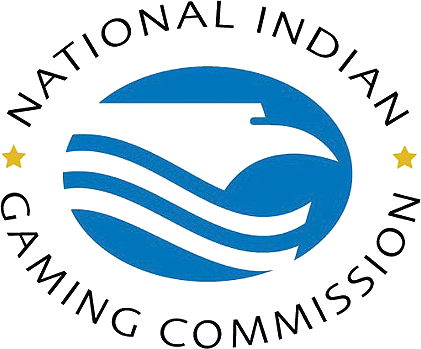
- Seal of the National Indian Gaming Commission

Agency overview
- Formed: October 18, 1988; 38 years ago
- Jurisdiction: Federal government of the United States
- Headquarters: Washington, D.C.
- Employees: 113 (2025)
- Annual budget: >US$31 million (2025)
- Agency executives: Vacant, Chairman; William "Billy" Kirkland, Vice Chair; Sharon Avery, Associate Commissioner
- Website: www.nigc.gov

The National Indian Gaming Commission (NIGC; /nɪɡˈsiː/) is a United States federal regulatory agency within the Department of the Interior. Congress established the agency pursuant to the Indian Gaming Regulatory Act in 1988.

The commission is the only federal agency focused solely on the regulation of gambling, though it has many counterpart state and tribal regulatory agencies. The U.S. Department of Justice and the Department of the Interior also have responsibilities related to gaming and Indian gaming, respectively.

The commission is an independent regulatory agency, but works closely with the Department of Justice and the Department of the Interior on matters of game classification and Indian lands questions. In addition, it is represented in litigation in court by the Department of Justice. Thus, its independence has some practical limits related to cooperation with Executive Branch agencies.

== History ==
The Indian Gaming Regulatory Act was enacted to support and promote tribal economic development, self-sufficiency and strong tribal governments through the operation of gaming on Indian lands. The act provides a regulatory framework to shield Indian gaming from corruption, and to ensure that the games offered are fair and honest and that tribes are the primary beneficiaries of gaming operations. The act created the commission to protect tribal gaming as a means of generating revenue for tribal communities. IGRA placed the commission within the Department of the Interior (DOI), but also provided it with independent federal regulatory authority. The commission monitors tribal gaming activity, inspects gaming premises, conducts background investigations and audits of Class II gaming operations (and Class III gaming operations, upon request or as provided by applicable law, such as tribal gaming ordinances and tribal-state compacts). The commission also provides technical assistance and training to tribal gaming commissions and operations and, when appropriate, undertakes enforcement actions.

Because the National Indian Gaming Commission is subject to the Government Performance and Results Act of 1993, they submitted in 2022 a strategic plan to Congress, which covers the fiscal years 2022 to 2026. NIGC's annual report is available here.

== Structure ==
The commission comprises a chair and two commissioners, each of whom serves on a full-time basis for a three-year term. The chair is appointed by the president and confirmed by the senate. The Secretary of the Interior appoints the other two commissioners. Under the act, at least two of the three commissioners must be enrolled members of a federally recognized Indian tribe, and no more than two members may be of the same political party. The commission also has a general counsel, who supervises the legal staff and advises the commission on its work. The current acting general counsel is Rea Cisneros.

The commission fulfills its responsibilities under IGRA by:

- regulating and monitoring certain aspects of Indian gaming;
- coordinating its regulatory responsibilities with tribal regulatory agencies through the review and approval of tribal gaming ordinances and management agreements;
- reviewing the backgrounds of individuals and entities to ensure the suitability of those seeking to manage Indian gaming;
- overseeing and reviewing the conduct and regulation of Indian gaming operations;
- referring law enforcement matters to appropriate tribal, federal and state entities; and
- when necessary, undertaking enforcement actions for violations of IGRA, NIGC's regulations and tribal gaming ordinances, including imposing appropriate sanctions for such violations.

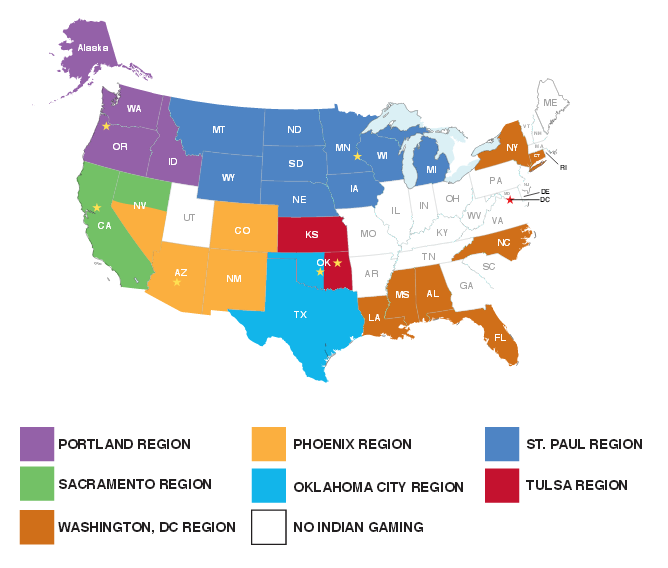
NIGC regions

The Commission provides Federal oversight to more than 520 tribal-licensed gaming establishments on Indian lands in 29 states. The Commission maintains its headquarters in Washington, DC, and has eight regions. The Commission staff is assigned to headquarters in Washington, DC, with the remaining staff assigned to regions located in Portland, Oregon; Sacramento, California; Phoenix, Arizona; St. Paul, Minnesota; Rapid City, South Dakota; Tulsa, Oklahoma; and Oklahoma City, Oklahoma.

The commission established its regions to improve the level and quality of services it provides to tribes, and to enhance its ability to communicate, collaborate, and interact with tribes located within each region's geographic region. These regions are vital to carrying out the statutory responsibilities of the commission. By having auditors and compliance officers close to tribal gaming facilities, the commission seeks to facilitate compliance with the act and better relationships with tribal leaders, officials, and regulatory personnel. In addition to auditing and investigative activities, the field staff provides technical assistance and training to promote a better understanding of gaming controls within the regulated industry and to enhance cooperation and compliance to ensure the integrity of gaming operations.

== Past commissioners ==
The following persons served as chair of the National Indian Gaming Commission:

No.	Image	Commission chairs	Term start	Term end	Refs.
1		Anthony J. Hope	January 1990	October 1994	
2		Harold Monteau	October 1994	January 1997	
Acting		Ada Deer	January 1997	May 1997	
Acting		Tom Foley	May 1997	September 1997	
Acting		Tadd Johnson	September 1997	October 1998	
3		Montie Deer	November 1998	September 2002	
4		Philip N. Hogen	December 2002	October 2009	
Acting		George Skibine	October 2009	June 2010	
5		Tracie Stevens	June 30, 2010	August 2013	
Acting		Jonodev O. Chaudhuri	October 2013	May 13, 2015	
6		Jonodev O. Chaudhuri	May 13, 2015	May 15, 2019	
7		E. Sequoyah Simermeyer	November 2019	February 2024	
Acting		Sharon Avery	May 15, 2024	January 12, 2026	

Commissioners	tenure
Joel M. Frank	November 1990 to November 1993
Jana M. McKeag	April 1991 to December 1995
Lacy Thornburg	August 1994 to March 1995
Tom Foley	September 1995 to March 1998
Phil Hogen	December 1995 to June 1999
Elizabeth Lohah Homer	July 1999 to July 2002
Teresa E. Poust	June 1999 to December 2002
Nelson W. Westrin	December 2002 to December 2005
Cloyce V. Choney	December 2002 to December 2007
Norman H. DesRosiers	January 2007 to January 2010
Steffani A. Cochran	January 2010 to January 2013
Daniel J. Little	April 2010 to June 2015
Kathryn Isom-Clause	March 2016 to July 2021
Jeannie Hovland	January 2021 to April 2026
Sharon Avery	May 2024 to present
William "Billy" Kirkland	June 2026 to present

== See also ==
- Casino
- Gaming Control Board
- Indian Gaming Regulatory Act
- Title 25 of the Code of Federal Regulations
