= Administration for Native Americans =

United States program office

Agency overview
- Formed: 1974
- Headquarters: 330 C Street SW, Washington, D.C.
- Agency executives: Patrice Kunesh, Commissioner; Hope MacDonald LoneTree, Deputy Commissioner
- Parent department: United States Department of Health and Human Services
- Parent Agency: Administration for Children and Families
- Key document: Native American Programs Act (NAPA)
- Website: acf.gov/ana

The Administration for Native Americans (ANA) is a program office within the United States Department of Health and Human Services, established in 1974 through the Native American Programs Act (NAPA).

== Background ==
The mission of ANA is to promote the goal of self-sufficiency and cultural preservation by providing social and economic development opportunities through financial assistance, training, and technical assistance to eligible tribes and Native American communities, including American Indians, Alaska Natives, Native Hawaiians, and other Native Pacific Islanders. ANA also oversees the Native Hawaiian Revolving Loan Fund, which is administered by the Office of Hawaiian affairs.

All ANA funding opportunity announcements (FOAs) are published at grants.gov. ANA project funding is available in short-term development periods of 12, 24, or 36 months, depending on the specific FOA. All ANA community projects must be completed by the end of the project period or supported by alternative funds. Training and technical assistance is available to applicants for project and proposal development and to grantees for project implementation and reporting.

Program areas include Social & Economic Development Strategies (SEDS), Native Languages, and Environmental Regulatory Enhancement.

ANA is led by a presidentially-appointed, Senate-confirmed commissioner, who oversees ANA’s discretionary funding programs, serves as an advocate for Native Americans, and coordinates activities within the U.S. Department of Health and Human Services to develop policies, programs, and budgets affecting Native Americans all under the authority of NAPA.

In order to maximize resources on behalf of Native communities, ANA partners with related programs in the Administration for Children and Families and the Department of Health and Human Services, as well as with other federal agencies and nonprofit organizations.

== See also ==
- Bureau of Indian Affairs
- The Administration for Children and Families
