= Mike Sieben =

American politician

Member of the Minnesota House of Representatives
- In office January 2, 1973 – January 3, 1983

Personal details
- Born: June 23, 1946 (age 80) Hastings, Minnesota
- Party: DFL
- Relations: Harry Sieben (brother); Katie Sieben (daughter)
- Education: St. Cloud State University (BS); University of Minnesota (JD)

Michael R. Sieben (born June 23, 1946) is a Minnesota politician and former member of the Minnesota House of Representatives.

A member of the Minnesota Democratic–Farmer–Labor Party (DFL), he represented Washington county in District 51B from 1973 until 1983.

== Early life and education ==
Sieben was born on June 23, 1946, and grew up in Hastings, Minnesota. He attended Hastings High School, followed by St. Cloud State University, where he graduated with a B.S. in Social Studies with Honors in 1968. Sieben attended law school at the University of Minnesota, graduating with a J.D. in 1972.

== Career and Minnesota legislature ==
After law school, Sieben served six years in the United States Army Reserve. He also served on the Minnesota Constitutional Study Commission as a researcher and on the Minnesota Higher Education Facilities Authority.

Sieben was first elected to the House in 1973, and was re-elected in 1975, 1977, 1979 and 1981. During his time in the Legislature, Sieben served on many committees, including: Appropriations (Chair), Commerce and Economic Development, Judiciary, Metropolitan and Urban Affairs and Rules and Legislative Administration.

Sieben was also a practicing attorney, having served as a partner at Sieben Polk, based in Hastings, Minnesota.
