= Katie Sieben =

American politician (born 1977)

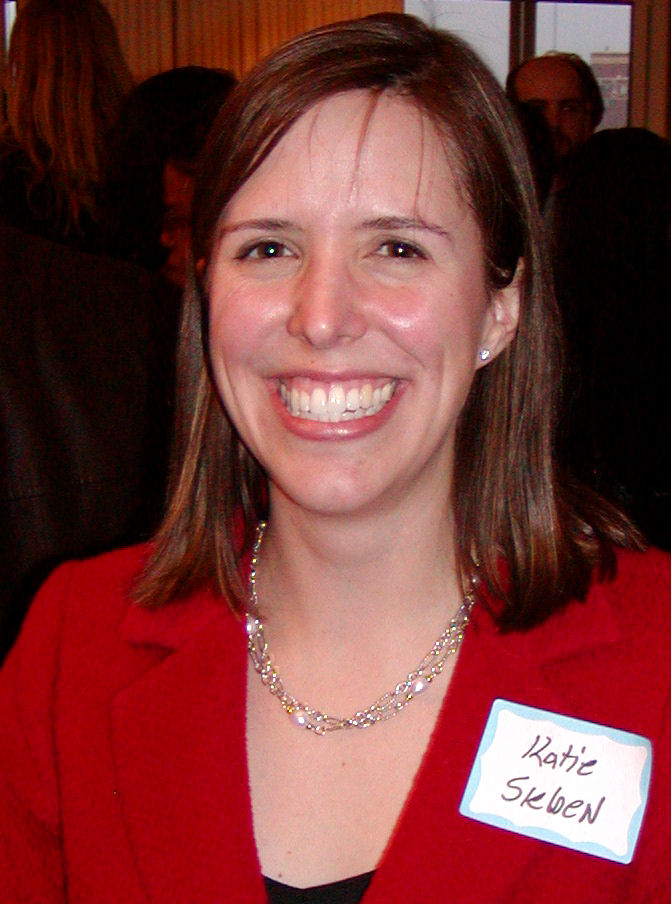
- Sieben in 2009

Chair of the Minnesota Public Utilities Commission
- In office April 2019 – Present

Member of the Minnesota Senate
- In office January 3, 2007 – January 2, 2017
- Preceded by: Sharon Marko
- Succeeded by: Dan Schoen
- Constituency: 57th (2007–2013); 54th (2013–2017)

Member of the Minnesota House of Representatives from the 57A district
- In office January 7, 2003 – January 2, 2007
- Preceded by: redrawn district
- Succeeded by: Karla Bigham

Personal details
- Born: March 23, 1977 (age 49) Newport, Minnesota, U.S.
- Party: Minnesota Democratic–Farmer–Labor Party
- Spouse: Josh Straka (m. 2005)
- Relations: Mike Sieben (father); Harry A. Sieben (uncle); Harry Sieben Sr. (grandfather)
- Children: 3
- Education: Colorado College (BA); Harvard University (MPA)

Katie Sieben (born March 23, 1977) is an American politician who currently serves as Chair of the Minnesota Public Utilities Commission. Sieben was appointed to the commission by Governor Mark Dayton in January 2017, and promoted to chair in April 2019 by Governor Tim Walz.

Previously, Sieben served as a member of the Minnesota Senate from 2007 to 2017, and before that, as a State Representative. A member of the Minnesota Democratic–Farmer–Labor Party (DFL), her districts included portions of Dakota and Washington counties.

== Early life and education ==
Sieben was born and raised in Newport, Minnesota. She earned a Bachelor of Arts degree from Colorado College and a Master of Public Administration from the Harvard Kennedy School. Sieben also served as a policy fellow at the Humphrey School of Public Affairs.

== Career ==
Sieben was first elected to the Senate in 2006, and was re-elected in 2010 and 2012. During the 89th Legislative Session (2015-2016), Sieben served as Assistant Majority Leader. She did not seek re-election in 2016.

Prior to her service in the Senate, she represented the 57A district in the Minnesota House of Representatives from 2003 to 2007.

Sieben also worked as an intern for United States Representative Bill Luther and as Deputy Chief of Staff for Senator Mark Dayton, who later served as Governor of Minnesota.

Her special legislative concerns included elections, environment, transportation, education, health care.

== Personal life ==
Sieben married Josh Straka in 2005. They have three children. Sieben's father, Michael, and uncle, Harry, also served in the Minnesota Legislature, being members of the House during the 1970s and early 1980s.
