= Otremba =

Otremba or Otręba is a surname. Pronounced identically, both forms occur in Poland but the standard spelling, Otręba, is twice as common. In other countries, Otremba may be more frequent to prevent mispronunciation.

Otremba/Otręba is the Polish equivalent of the Czech surname Otruba. Both mean bran.

Notable people with the surname include:

- Ken Otremba (1948–1997), American politician
- Mary Ellen Otremba (1950–2014), American politician
