= 1945 Australian National Airways Stinson crash =

Aircraft crash in Victoria, Australia

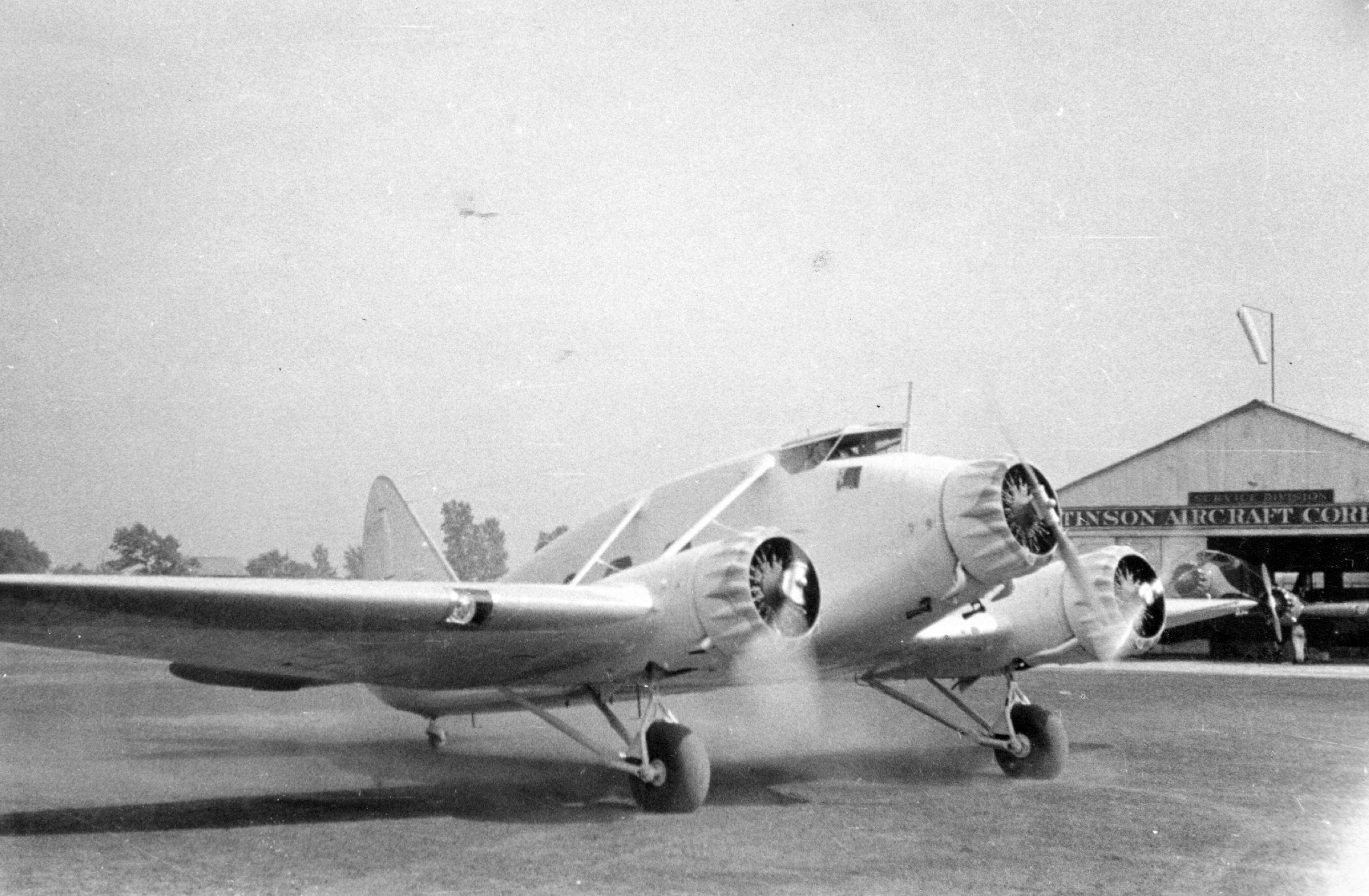
- A Stinson Model A in standard trimotor configuration

Accident
- Date: 31 January 1945
- Summary: Fatigue failure of wing structure
- Site: Mia Mia, Victoria, Australia. 37.0200°S 144.5663°E

Aircraft
- Aircraft type: Stinson Model A (modified)
- Aircraft name: Tokana
- Registration: VH-UYY
- Flight origin: Essendon Airport, Melbourne, Victoria, Australia
- Stopover: Kerang Airport, Kerang, Victoria, Australia
- 2nd stopover: Mildura Airport, Mildura, Victoria, Australia
- Destination: Broken Hill Airport, Broken Hill, New South Wales, Australia
- Passengers: 8
- Crew: 2
- Fatalities: 10
- Survivors: 0

On 31 January 1945 a Stinson Model A aircraft departed from Melbourne for a flight of 127 nautical miles (235 km) to Kerang, Victoria—the first leg of an Australian National Airways regular scheduled service to Broken Hill, New South Wales. It crashed 50 nmi (93 km) from Melbourne. All ten occupants were killed in the accident. The aircraft was one of four Stinsons imported in 1936 by Airlines of Australia (AoA). Three had now crashed with the loss of 17 lives, and the fourth would not be permitted to fly again.

It was determined that the accident was caused by a fatigue crack in the main spar of the left wing that caused the outer part of the left wing, outboard of the engine nacelle, to separate from the remainder of the aircraft. The expert panel investigating the accident believed this to be the first fatal aircraft accident anywhere in the world directly attributable to metal fatigue.

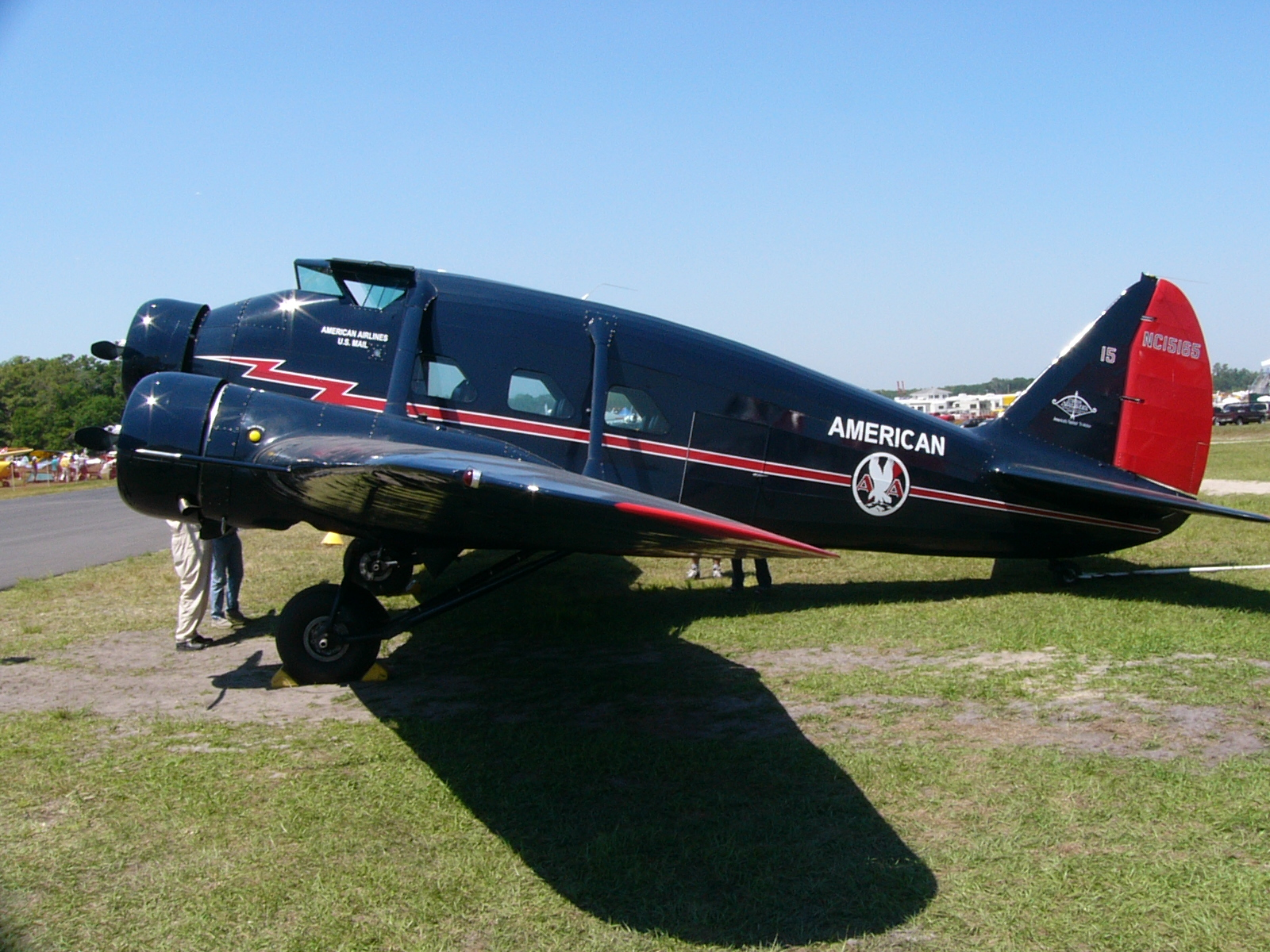
Stinson Model A in original trimotor configuration

The accident and related matters were investigated by a Supreme Court judge who also found that the aircraft's left wing failed in flight due to a fatigue crack. The judge made five recommendations including one that a safe flying life should be fixed for each metal aircraft registered in Australia to avoid further failures due to metal fatigue. This practice is now called safe-lifeing.

== The flight ==
The aircraft was a modified Stinson Model A registered VH-UYY and operated by Australian National Airways (ANA) as the Tokana. On 31 January 1945 the Tokana departed from Melbourne's Essendon Airport at 7:55 am local time for a flight to Broken Hill, stopping at Kerang and Mildura. (Note: ANA flew the route from Essendon to Kerang, Mildura and Broken Hill, and return, six days a week.) On board were two pilots and eight passengers. A strong and gusting wind was blowing from the south-west and the sky was mostly overcast with the base of the clouds about 2,000 ft (610 m) above sea level. About 20 minutes after takeoff the aircraft was approaching Redesdale and several people observed it flying about 1,000 ft (300 m) above ground level, just below the cloud base.

Several witnesses reported hearing a sharp crack followed by cessation of noise from the engines. When they looked up they saw the Stinson spiralling downwards. Part of one wing had separated from the remainder of the aircraft and it was drifting slowly towards the ground. As they watched, they saw the whole tail assembly break free from the fuselage. Moments later the wreckage struck the ground and a pall of black smoke rose into the air. Part of the left wing, outboard of the engine nacelle, continued to drift down slowly and reached the ground about ¾ mile (1.2 km) from the main wreckage.

The crash occurred 21 minutes after taking off from Essendon Airport. The flight covered a distance of only 50 nmi (93 km) and ended in farming country about 2 miles (3.2 km) east of Redesdale. The site of the crash in Mia Mia was once part of "Spring Plains" Station which had been owned by John Robertson Duigan and was where he constructed and flew the first aeroplane in Australia.

External image
- Newspaper photographs of the wreckage of VH-UYY

The main wreckage consisting of the fuselage, right inner wing, and left inner wing still with its engine attached, struck the ground inverted and was immediately consumed by fire. The bodies of the eight passengers were found in what remained of the cabin but were burned beyond recognition. The violent gyration of the fuselage threw the two pilots through the roof of the cockpit. Their bodies were found unburned 12–15 yards (11–14 m) from the main wreckage. The tail of the aircraft broke away from the fuselage and fell to the ground about 220 yards (200 m) from the main wreckage.

The outer section of the left wing, outboard of the engine nacelle, was found about ¾ mile (1.2 km) from the main wreckage. Apart from the fracture surfaces on the inboard ends of the spars it was almost undamaged. The right wing was torn into three sections by the violence of the gyrations and struck the ground 150 yards (140 m) from the main wreckage. The right engine was torn away from the right wing and struck the ground about 50 feet (15 m) from the main wreckage. It was slightly damaged by the fire. The main wreckage trail was about 100 yards (91 m) long. In the gyrations of the aircraft after separation of the outer part of the left wing, other parts broke free and separated from the main wreckage. Many small pieces of wreckage were found scattered over a wide area.

== The aircraft ==
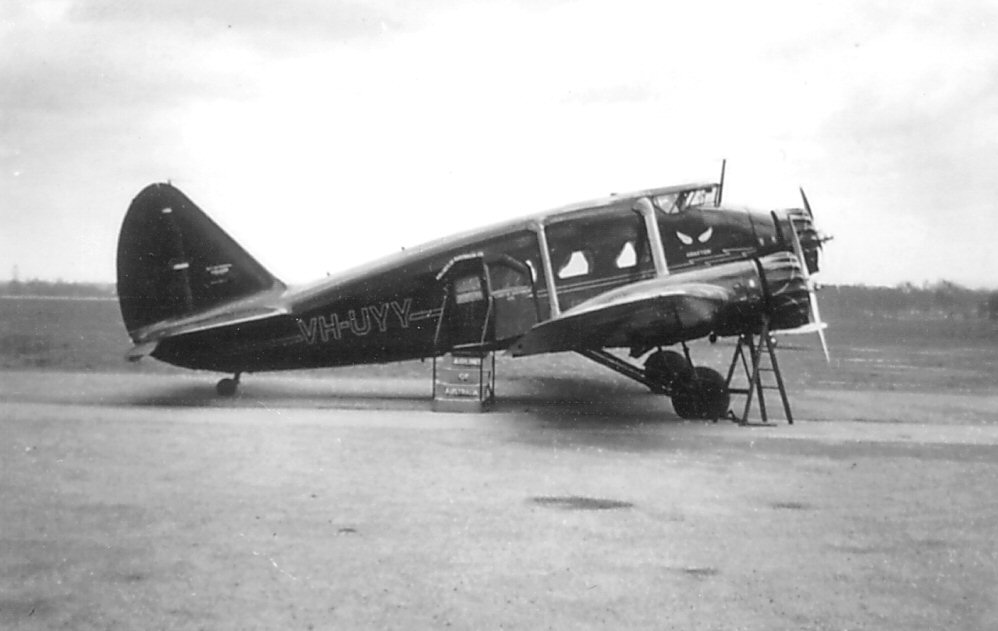
The aircraft involved in the accident, prior to conversion to twin engines

The Stinson Model A was a tri-motor with three Lycoming R-680 radial engines, each of 235 horsepower (175 kW). It was approved to fly at a maximum weight of 10,500 lb (4,763 kg). Four Stinson Model A aircraft were imported to Australia in 1936 and operated by Airlines of Australia. (Note: The four Stinsons were registered VH-UGG (Lismore), VH-UHH (Brisbane), VH-UKK (Grafton) and VH-UYY (Townsville). Airlines of Australia and Australian National Airways were competitors until March 1937 when ANA acquired 60% of the shares in AoA. On 1 July 1942 ANA acquired the remaining 40% of the shares in AoA. Over the next six months all AoA's aircraft were re-painted with ANA's all-silver colour scheme and re-branded with new names – Townsville was re-named Tokana, and Grafton was re-named Binana. ANA made a practice of naming its aircraft with names ending in ana.)

After the outbreak of war in the Pacific in December 1941, Airlines of Australia had found it impossible to obtain spare parts for the Lycoming R-680 engines in its two remaining Stinsons (a Stinson had crashed in February 1937 and another in March 1937). In early 1943 the decision was made to convert both aircraft to twin-engine configuration by removing the Lycoming engines and installing a 550 horsepower (410 kW) 9-cylinder Pratt & Whitney R-1340-AN1 Wasp engine on each wing. These engines had been imported to Australia in large numbers for use as tank engines. The noses of the two aircraft were to be re-built by installing streamlined structures made of aluminium sheet.

By October 1943 VH-UYY had been converted to twin-engine configuration in the Essendon Airport facilities of Australian National Airways which had taken over Airlines of Australia. The increase in total power from 705 to 1,100 hp (526 to 820 kW) improved the takeoff, climb and one-engine-inoperative performance of the aircraft and permitted the maximum weight to be increased to 11,200 lb (5,080 kg) for takeoff. (Note: The strength of the undercarriage restricted the maximum landing weight to 10,750 lb (4,876 kg). At the time of installation of the Pratt & Whitney engines, dump valves were also installed to allow dumping of fuel if an emergency forced the crew to land shortly after takeoff. Testing of VH-UKK Binana showed that 450 lb (204 kg) of fuel could be dumped in flight so the maximum weight of VH-UKK and VH-UYY was set at 11,200 lb (5,080 kg).) For the next 15 months Tokana was used on the Melbourne-Kerang-Mildura-Broken Hill route.

VH-UYY flew for 13,763 hours, including 2,797 hours since its conversion to a twin-engine aeroplane. (Note: Conversion of VH-UKK to twin-engines was completed first. Shortly after it re-entered service the fabric on its left wing was slightly damaged in a brief fire during re-fuelling at Mackay, Queensland. The left wing of VH-UYY, which was undergoing conversion at Essendon Airport, was taken to Mackay and installed on VH-UKK to allow it to return to service. The fire-damaged wing from VH-UKK was taken to Essendon Airport, repaired, and installed on VH-UYY. This was the wing that ultimately failed on 31 January 1945. VH-UKK had flown for 11,670 hours prior to conversion to twin-engine configuration. By the time VH-UKK ceased flying it had flown for 15,020 hours.)

== Investigation ==
Investigators were able to determine the most likely sequence of the in-flight break-up:

1. left outer wing
2. tail assembly
3. right wing
4. right engine

Investigators found nothing in the wreckage to indicate there had been an explosion or fire in the aircraft prior to it striking the ground. It was immediately clear that the outer part of the left wing had broken away from the aircraft. The lower boom in the main spar had failed at the outboard edge of the engine nacelle and then the upper boom had also failed as the result of the wing folding upwards under the air loads imposed on it. The rear spar had then failed, allowing the entire outer part of the wing to separate from the aircraft and drift slowly to the ground.

The fracture surfaces on the outer part of the left wing were examined by the Council for Scientific and Industrial Research at its Division of Aeronautics in Melbourne. These examinations determined that separation of the left wing was initiated by metal fatigue of the lower main spar boom attachment socket. The primary structure of the Stinson was of welded steel tube construction. A fatigue crack had initiated in weld metal on the inner surface of the socket. After propagating through the weld metal during a large number of flights, the fatigue crack entered the socket's parent metal. This crack eventually affected 45% of the cross-section of the socket before the lower boom failed on the fatal flight. Investigators noted the amount of metal in the socket that was unaffected by the fatigue crack at the time of the accident and calculated that the wing was capable of supporting loads up to about 2.5 times the weight of the aircraft on its fatal flight. This suggested the gusting winds prevailing at the time, and the turbulence associated with the low altitude at which the aircraft was flying, were partly responsible for the failure.

The matching socket in the spar in the right wing was also examined and found to be affected by a similar fatigue crack in the interior of the weld metal. This crack was detected by magnaflux inspection but could not be seen by visual examination.

External image
- Image of VH-UKK after conversion to twin Wasp engines and silver colour scheme. VH-UYY was similarly converted.

The Investigation Panel determined that the conversion from three-engine to two-engine configuration was not a cause of the accident. It found that fatigue failure of the wing was inevitable, and this modification and subsequent operation at a higher weight caused only slight shortening of the time before the failure occurred.

In its report, the Investigation Panel wrote:

"The crash is, as far as is known to the Panel, the first example of a failure inflight of an aircraft structure attributable directly to fatigue.

"In the type of construction embodied in these aircraft, where concentrated loads are carried by a small number of heavy members, a single fatigue failure can, and in fact has caused, a complete structural collapse.

"The Panel feels impelled to assert that neither the original design nor the original manufacture was at fault ... the tragedy has several new lessons to teach all concerned with aviation, and that learning provides some small degree of compensation for the loss of valuable human lives."

The Investigation Panel's report was completed in two weeks (Note: The Investigation Panel's report was sent to the Minister for Civil Aviation on 17 February 1945.) and included five recommendations:

1. Critical joints of all heat treated, welded steel tube aircraft structures should be examined annually by the magnaflux method.
2. The unique nature of the accident should be drawn to the attention of the Australian Council for Aeronautics. The council should be asked to study the phenomenon of metal fatigue in aircraft structures.
3. The certificate of airworthiness of VH-UKK Binana, the sole Stinson Model A surviving in Australia, should be cancelled immediately.
4. Both wings of VH-UKK should be sent to the Division of Aeronautics laboratories for test and examination to advance the knowledge of fatigue of aircraft structures.
5. The Department of Civil Aviation should obtain a suitable number of V-G recorders (Note: A V-G recorder is an elementary recording device for continually recording an aircraft's speed (V) and manoeuvre load factor (G).) and install them in airline aircraft operating in Australia to survey the conditions arising on major air routes.

The Minister for Civil Aviation, Mr Arthur Drakeford, made a detailed statement to Parliament that an undetected fatigue crack in a welded joint in a boom attachment fitting in the left wing caused the crash. Drakeford also said he was satisfied the work of the Investigation Panel was completed competently and thoroughly.

== Inquiry ==
Mr Joseph Clark, a member of parliament, had flown in Tokana five days prior to the crash. Two Royal Australian Air Force (RAAF) aircraft mechanics who were fellow-passengers had shown him a small crack in the aircraft's elevator hinge bracket. Clark had advised the two to tell the pilot about the crack if they thought it was serious. After the crash, Clark reported this conversation to the Minister for Civil Aviation and made a statement to the press. He repeated his statement in the House of Representatives. There was also criticism from Mr Thomas White that the Investigation Panel's report had not focussed attention on the major alteration involved in the conversion from a three-engined aeroplane to a two-engined aeroplane. Thomas White was a member of parliament and a former RAAF group captain. Following this criticism in the Parliament House of Representatives the Minister for Civil Aviation, Arthur Drakeford, appointed Mr Justice Philp of the Supreme Court of Queensland to conduct an inquiry into the accident using the powers of the National Security Act.

The Air Court of Inquiry first sat on 27 March 1945 in Melbourne, chaired by Mr Justice Philp. The terms of reference for the Inquiry were to inquire into the causes of the accident; to investigate Mr Clark's allegations about a crack in the elevator hinge bracket; and to investigate Mr White's concerns that the Investigation Panel had neglected to consider the significant alteration made by removing three engines and replacing them with two engines.

The Inquiry heard evidence that the annual inspection of VH-UYY had been completed on 2 November 1944 and since then it had flown for 525 hours. At an inspection of this kind it was possible to examine most of the welded joints in the wing, but not the welded spar joint that ultimately failed. That joint had not been inspected since installation of Pratt & Whitney engines in 1943. The Inquiry also heard that the maximum weights of all civil aircraft registered in Australia were determined conservatively and in a manner that was consistent with the International Convention on Aerial Navigation. The increase in maximum weight of VH-UYY was only granted after all appropriate calculations had been performed to ensure the aircraft was safe at the increased weight.

Mr Justice Philp presented the Court's report to the Governor-General on 10 April 1945. The Court found that the accident was caused by a fatigue crack in the lower boom of the main spar in the left wing. It found that the presence of a crack in the elevator hinge bracket could not be determined but even if a crack had been present it had not contributed to the cause of the accident. It also found that the change of engines was not part of the cause of the accident but the increase in maximum weight had caused the accident to occur a little earlier than would have happened otherwise.

Mr Justice Philp's report contained five recommendations:

1. Ground engineers and aircraft inspectors should receive instruction in the inspection of welding in aircraft structures.
2. ANA should be given a licence to import a detector for examining welding used in aircraft structures. If this detector proved satisfactory, similar detectors should be installed at all major aerodromes.
3. Investigations made to determine how to calculate a limit on the flying life of aircraft.
4. Duplicates of all log books should be kept on the ground.
5. Regulations regarding the constitution and powers of Air Courts of Inquiry should be reviewed.

== Aftermath ==
The sole remaining Stinson Model A in Australia, VH-UKK Binana, had its certificate of airworthiness suspended and it did not fly again. The accident drew public attention to the potential for metal fatigue to cause sudden failure of the structure of a modern civil aircraft. The Department of Civil Aviation began a practice of calculating the safe retirement life of metal aircraft registered in Australia.

In December 1946 the University of Melbourne organised an international symposium titled The Failure of Metals by Fatigue, the first such symposium in an English-speaking country. Five of the thirty technical papers presented at the symposium dealt specifically with the problem of metal fatigue in aircraft. (Note: Six of the thirty technical papers were presented by speakers from the United Kingdom; and three from the USA.)

The Structures and Materials Division of the Division of Aeronautics laboratory at Fishermen's Bend, Melbourne began a long-term program aimed at advancing the knowledge of metal fatigue in aircraft structures. Surplus wings, manufactured by Commonwealth Aircraft Corporation during its licence-production of North American P-51 Mustang aircraft, were tested by repeated loading to examine the characteristics of fatigue in aircraft structures. Eventually, approximately 200 Mustang wings were tested in this way.

== See also ==
- 1937 Airlines of Australia Stinson crash
- List of disasters in Australia by death toll
- List of accidents and incidents involving commercial aircraft
- List of accidents and incidents involving airliners by location

== Bibliography ==
- Job, Macarthur (1992). Air Crash Vol. 2, Chapter 2. Aerospace Publications Pty. Ltd. Fyshwick, Australia. pp. 200. ISBN 1-875671-01-3
