= Duigan biplane =

Duigan biplane may refer to a number of different, otherwise unnamed aircraft designed and/or built by John Duigan:

- the Duigan pusher biplane, the first Australian powered aircraft
- the Avro Duigan, built by Avro in the UK to a design by Duigan
- the Duigan tractor biplane, Duigan's final design
