= Mary Franson =

American politician

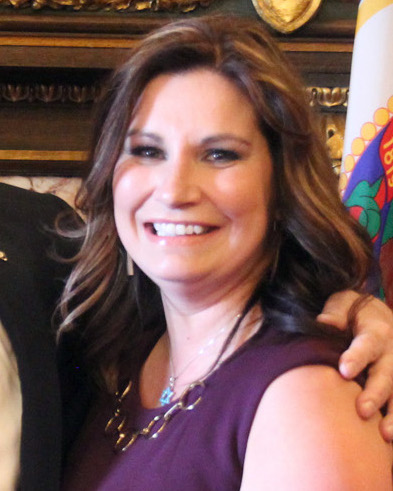

Member of the Minnesota House of Representatives from the 12B district 8B (2013-2022), 11B (2011–2013)
- Incumbent
- Assumed office January 4, 2011
- Preceded by: Mary Ellen Otremba

Personal details
- Born: Mary Bensoni; March 1, 1977 (age 49) Saginaw, Minnesota, U.S.
- Party: Republican Party of Minnesota
- Children: Three (Helena, Karl, Kahllin)
- Education: University of Minnesota Duluth
- Profession: Child care provider, legislator

Mary Danielle Franson (born March 1, 1977) is a Minnesota politician and member of the Minnesota House of Representatives. A member of the Republican Party of Minnesota, she represents District 12B, which includes portions of Douglas, Stearns and Pope Counties in west-central Minnesota. Franson is a licensed child care provider and a former employee of AT&T.

== Early life and education ==
Franson graduated from AlBrook High School in Saginaw and the University of Minnesota Duluth in Duluth with a B.A. in psychology and humanities. She and her family live in Alexandria.

== Political career ==
Franson was first elected to the House in 2010, succeeding Mary Ellen Otremba, who did not seek reelection.

On election night, November 6, 2012, Franson had a one-vote margin of victory, triggering an automatic recount under Minnesota law. After 32 voters received ballots for the incorrect race and three additional voters were not accounted for, a judge ruled that 35 ballots should be pulled from the total at random. The new ballots were counted, and Franson had a 12-vote lead. Challenger Bob Cunniff conceded on November 29.

As of 2026, Franson has won eight straight House terms.

Franson has served on several committees during her legislative career, including Health and Human Services Finance, Early Childhood Finance and Policy, Higher Education Finance & Policy, Health & Human Services Reform, and Aging & Long-Term Care Policy. She chaired the Subcommittee on Childcare Access & Affordability.

== Political positions ==
=== Abortion ===
In 2017, Franson authored a bill to ban any funds from state-funded healthcare programs from being used for abortions. The bill passed both houses of the legislature, but Governor Mark Dayton vetoed it.

=== Child care ===
A former childcare provider, Franson has authored multiple bills on childcare-related issues. She was a vocal opponent of an executive order issued by Governor Dayton allowing for the unionization of childcare providers. In May 2018, Franson called for the state to take action against childcare fraud uncovered by KMSP-TV. That month, Dayton signed into law a bill authored by Franson that unanimously passed both of Minnesota's legislative houses. The bill cut regulations on childcare providers that were viewed as burdensome.

=== Environment ===
On April 20, 2012, Franson objected to the opening prayer on the House floor, in which House Chaplain Francis Grady mentioned Earth Day and tied it to the Gulf oil spill. She tweeted that the prayer "may as well been dedicated to 'Mother Earth', coincidence? I think not. 2nd offensive prayer in a month."

In June 2018, Franson was one of four Republican legislators who secured state funding to help clean up two lakes in Alexandria, Minnesota.

=== Climate change ===
During a On March 24, 2026, Minnesota House capital investment committee discussion about future weather trends and infrastructure, Franson, who co-chairs the committee, made comments denying climate change: "My faith is not in climate change. It's not in scientists dictating what we should and should not do to save the environment. Because my faith is in Jesus Christ. [...] And if you've read the good book, you know how it ends. It's not with climate change."

=== Free speech ===
On September 27, 2024, Franson sued Minnesota Attorney General Keith Ellison, claiming the state's ban on deepfakes and AI-generated content was a violation of the United States' First Amendment protections of political speech and parody.

=== Gun control ===
After the March for Our Lives demonstration on March 24, 2018, Franson authored and shared several posts on Facebook that critics claimed were comparing the survivors of the Stoneman Douglas High School shooting to the Hitler Youth. On March 27, Franson said she did not intend to link the protesters to Hitler Youth. On March 28, she apologized and said, "Because of the timing of my posts, I now understand why it appears that I was making a comparison."

=== Healthcare ===
Franson authored a bill protecting up to $25,000 of an individual's healthcare saving from debt collectors. The bill was passed unanimously by both Minnesota legislative houses and signed into law by Governor Dayton on May 3, 2018.

On July 1, 2018, a law authored by Franson requiring the licensing of athletic trainers took effect in Minnesota.

Franson authored a bill to ban female genital mutilation in Minnesota.

=== LGBT issues ===
Franson was one of the authors of a bill, introduced on April 28, 2011, seeking to amend the Minnesota State Constitution to define marriage as being "recognized as only a union between one man and one woman."

On April 8, 2014, Franson characterized an anti-bullying bill as "fascism" and an "attack on the Bible and conservative Christians."

On November 9, 2017, after transgender politicians Andrea Jenkins and Phillipe Cunningham were elected to the Minneapolis City Council, Franson tweeted, "A guy who thinks he's a girl is still a guy with a mental health condition." The tweet was criticized by state lawmakers, many of whom pointed out that being transgender is not considered a mental illness by the American Psychological Association. Franson posted a defiant apology on Facebook, saying that she did "not apologize for not conforming to the PC world where I'm supposed to go along with fantasy and participate in it. This isn't the first time I've offended the social justice warriors and it won't be the last."

=== Immigration and Customs Enforcement (ICE) ===
During the winter of 2025–2026, Franson supported the ICE operations in Minnesota. She said the heavy increase in law enforcement was justified; that ICE would target only bad people; and that law-abiding citizens had nothing to fear. When asked by a reporter about President Trump calling Somali immigrants "garbage people", she said, "If you are defrauding our government, our state, our taxpayers, you are garbage." After the killing of Renée Good, Franson still defended ICE, saying that childcare-related fraud was a more important story to follow. She also defended ICE's tactics, saying she believed that ICE was targeting only bad people and Good was interfering.

== Electoral history ==
Summary of the 2010 General Election for House District 11B
Party	Candidate	Votes	Percentage
Republican	Mary Franson	7,798	48.85%
Democratic–Farmer–Labor	Amy L. Hunter	5,147	32.25%
Independent	Bert Pexsa	2,680	16.79%

Summary of the 2012 General Election for House District 8B
Party	Candidate	Votes	Percentage
Republican	Mary Franson	10,642	47.52%
Democratic–Farmer–Labor	Bob Cunniff	10,630	47.47%

Summary of the 2014 General Election for House District 8B
Party	Candidate	Votes	Percentage
Republican	Mary Franson	9,270	58.41%
Democratic–Farmer–Labor	Jay Sieling	6,565	41.36%

Summary of the 2016 General Election for House District 8B
Party	Candidate	Votes	Percentage
Republican	Mary Franson	14,749	64.87%
Democratic–Farmer–Labor	Gail Kulp	7,962	35.02%

Summary of the 2018 General Election for House District 8B
Party	Candidate	Votes	Percentage
Republican	Mary Franson	11,831	62.04%
Democratic–Farmer–Labor	Gail Kulp	7,231	37.92%

Summary of the 2020 General Election for House District 8B
Party	Candidate	Votes	Percentage
Republican	Mary Franson	17,307	68.03%
Democratic–Farmer–Labor	Carol Wenner	8,101	31.84%

Summary of the 2022 General Election for House District 12B
Party	Candidate	Votes	Percentage
Republican	Mary Franson	13,756	69.89%
Democratic–Farmer–Labor	Jeremy Vinar	5,908	30.02%

Summary of the 2024 General Election for House District 12B
Party	Candidate	Votes	Percentage
Republican	Mary Franson	18,571	76.73%
Democratic–Farmer–Labor	Judd Hoff	4,946	20.44%
