= Roland Degg =

English military officer

Roland Degg (10 February 1909 – 2001) was an English military officer active in World War II. As a field officer he attained the rank of Lieutenant Colonel temporarily, when he took command of the 38th column of the South Staffordshires Regiment in Japanese-held Myanmar in 1944.

Degg was awarded a Distinguished Service Order (DSO) for his command of the 1st Battalion of the South Staffordshire Regiment during World War II.

== Early life ==
Degg was born in Cannock, West Midlands, England. He was educated at Chadsmoor Boys' School in Cannock until he was 13, when he left school in order to work at the colliery at Huntington as a "nipper", with additional duties looking after pit ponies. During the General Strike in 1926, he enlisted with the South Staffordshire Regiment of the British Army, aged 15, although the legal minimum age to enlist as a soldier was 16 years.

== Military career ==
=== Early service (1926–1939) ===
Degg's early service was with the 2nd Battalion of the Regiment stationed in India and Palestine. He was made Lance Corporal during 1931, and later to a full Corporal, and was captain of the battalion football team during 1934. The following year he was posted to the 1st Battalion at Aldershot when the regiment competed for the Army football cup. Remaining with the 1st Battalion, by 1937 he had become a Sergeant, and was one of the three men selected as escort to the regimental colours of King George VI.

=== World War II ===
Degg was stationed in Palestine when World War II broke out. In May 1940 as Sergeant-Major, he was moved to the Western Desert of northern Africa, to fight in General Archibald Wavell's 1940-41 Libyan Campaign. On 10 December 1940 he took part in an assault on a strongly-defended Italian position at Sidi Barrani. At the end of the battle, Degg's commanding officer presented him with two pips while he was in a slit trench. In 1941 his battalion was moved to India, to fulfill duties in internal security and in protecting supplies and transport from Indian dissidents.

=== Myanmar ===
Degg was a member of the Chindits, which was the most manned special force operating within the second world war. As part of the Chindits, the South Staffordshires were split into two columns, 38, commanded by Lieutenant Colonel Richards, and 80, commanded by Degg.

The South Staffordshires were landed by aircraft and gliders into jungle clearings. Degg's column was ordered to establish a block on the Mandalay railway at Henu. Their objective was Stafford Hill, occupied by a large force of soldiers of the Imperial Japanese army. As Degg established the column's position they were attacked during the night by Japanese soldiers, but were able to repel them until the morning, when 38 column and a column of Gurkhas arrived to bolster their defence against a renewed attack.

When Brigadier Calvert arrived, Degg was ordered to attack Japanese positions, which involved hand-to-hand fighting and the use of man-pack flamethrowers. After a re-supply airdrop on 18 March 1944, Calvert moved his headquarters to "White City" (a reference to the many parachutes which draped the tall trees), where the Staffordshires defended the northern and eastern sectors.

On 21 March, the Japanese launched a full-scale attack on White City with grenades and mortars. In the early hours of the morning, Richards was killed leading a counter-attack, and Degg therefore took command of the whole battalion, which repelled the Japanese soldiers incurring significant losses. Special Force, though under repeated attack, now controlled 30 miles of railway. Having taken heavy casualties, Calvert decided to move to a location designated "Blackpool", a new defensive perimeter further north between Mawlu and Mogaung.

Calvert learnt that Chinese and Americans forces were approaching Myitkyina, and subsequently received orders that his brigade should attack Mogaung. The 77th Indian Infantry had only 550 effective soldiers at that time, many of them wounded and nearly all suffering from a mixture of malaria, jungle sores or swollen feet. Nevertheless, the force took Mogaung in an assault sometime about midnight, with the Staffords and Gurkhas wading through rivers and marshes and clearing hills and ridges in close-quarter fighting. The Mogaung battle lasted from 31 May until 27 June 1944. Degg took part in all attacks, and was at the front line of the battle throughout. After the capture of Mogaung at the end of the operation in Burma, the South Staffordshires regiment were flown to India.

His DSO citation of 1945 (#161995) proclaimed, "Under his leadership, his battalion never failed in attack or lost ground in defence. The battalion has continually outmatched the Japanese in courage, in defence, endurance and bravery, and this has been largely due to Lt-Col Degg's skill and stubbornness."

=== After 1945 ===
At the end of the World war, Degg trained Dutch troops at Chichester. He then attended Staff College and took up a staff appointment in Western Command. He was also a sportsman, footballer, swimmer, water-polo player and athletic all-rounder, noted for his skill in the hammer throw. In 1951, he returned to the 1st Battalion of his regiment as commanding officer, taking the regiment to Hong Kong, Northern Ireland and Germany, before handing over the command in April 1954.

== Post-military career ==
Degg was personnel manager of Horseley Bridge and Thomas Piggott Engineers in Tipton, West Midlands, from 1954 until his retirement in 1975.

== Personal life ==
Degg had four daughters by his first marriage (née Spires). He died aged 92 in hospital in Wolverhampton.

== See also ==
- Bob Lilley (British Army soldier) - 10 February 1914, Wolverhampton

== Sources ==
Wolverhampton Civic Centre Register of Births, Deaths and Marriages

"Origins of the Special Forces". www.nam.ac.uk. "...Calvert, went on to play a crucial role in establishing a specialist jungle fighting unit, part of 21st SAS, during the Malayan Emergency..."

"Special Air Service". www.nam.ac.uk.

"Cabinet papers/themes/egypt-libya". www.nationalarchives.gov.uk.

Sebag-Montefiore, Hugh (16 July 2016). Somme Into the Breach. Harvard University Press. p. 218. ISBN 9780674970038. Archived from the original on 16 May 2021. Alt URL
