= Chindits =

Long-range raiding force of the Army of India during WW2

Chindits (Long Range Penetration Groups)
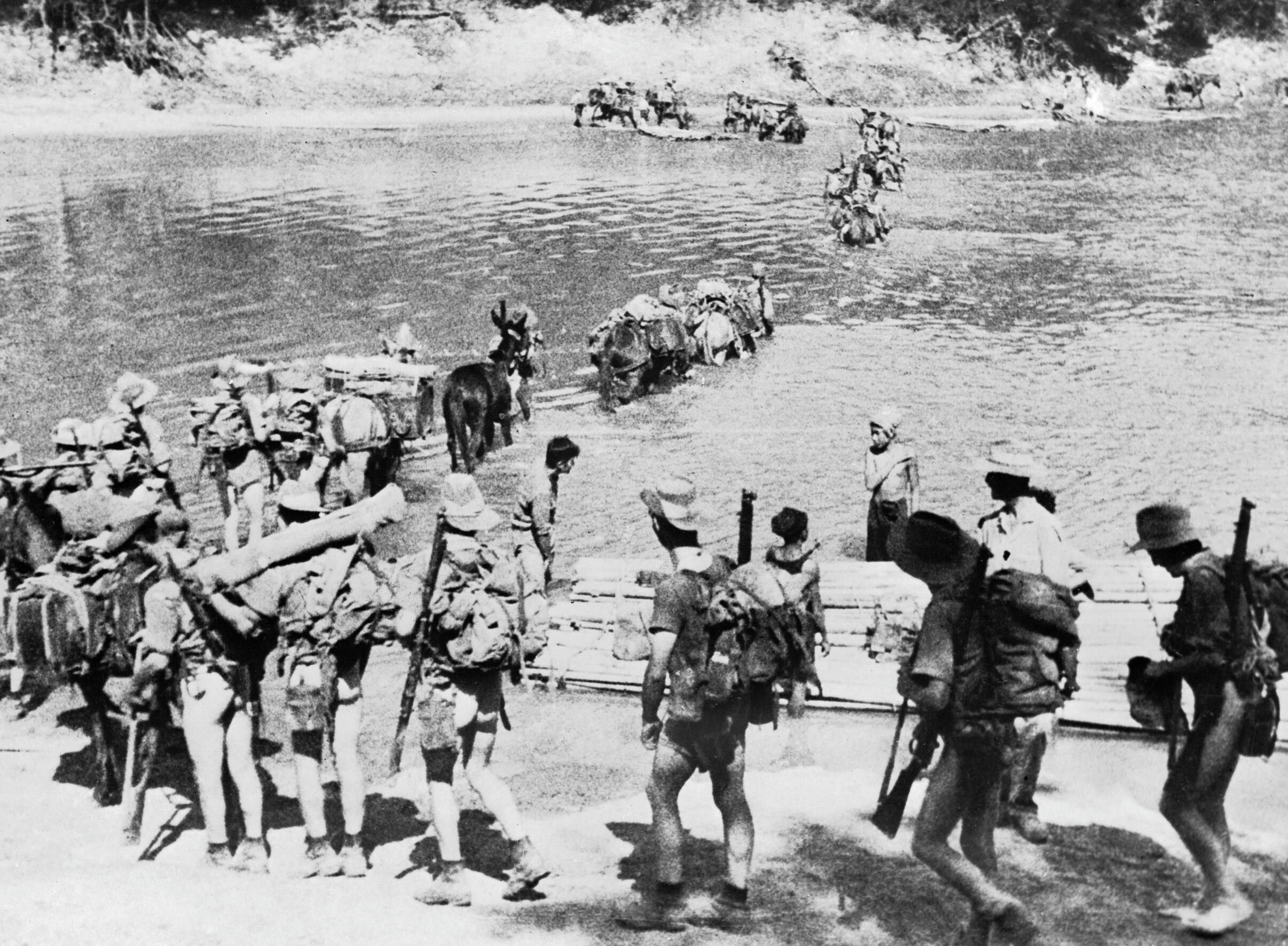
- A Chindit column crosses a river in Burma; men suffering from dysentery often went naked.
- Active: 1942–1945
- Country: (British Raj) British India; United Kingdom
- Allegiance: British Empire
- Branch: British Army; British Indian Army
- Type: Special forces
- Role: Direct action Jungle warfare Long-range penetration Raiding; Special operations Special reconnaissance
- Size: Operation Longcloth (1943): 3,000 men Operation Thursday (1944): 20,000 men, of which 9,000 to 12,000 deployed to Burma
- Garrison/HQ: Jhansi, India
- Motto: 9 Gorkha ho ki hoina
- Engagements: Burma campaign of World War II
- Decorations: Four members awarded the Victoria Cross

Commanders
- Notable commanders: Orde Wingate, Walter Lentaigne

Insignia
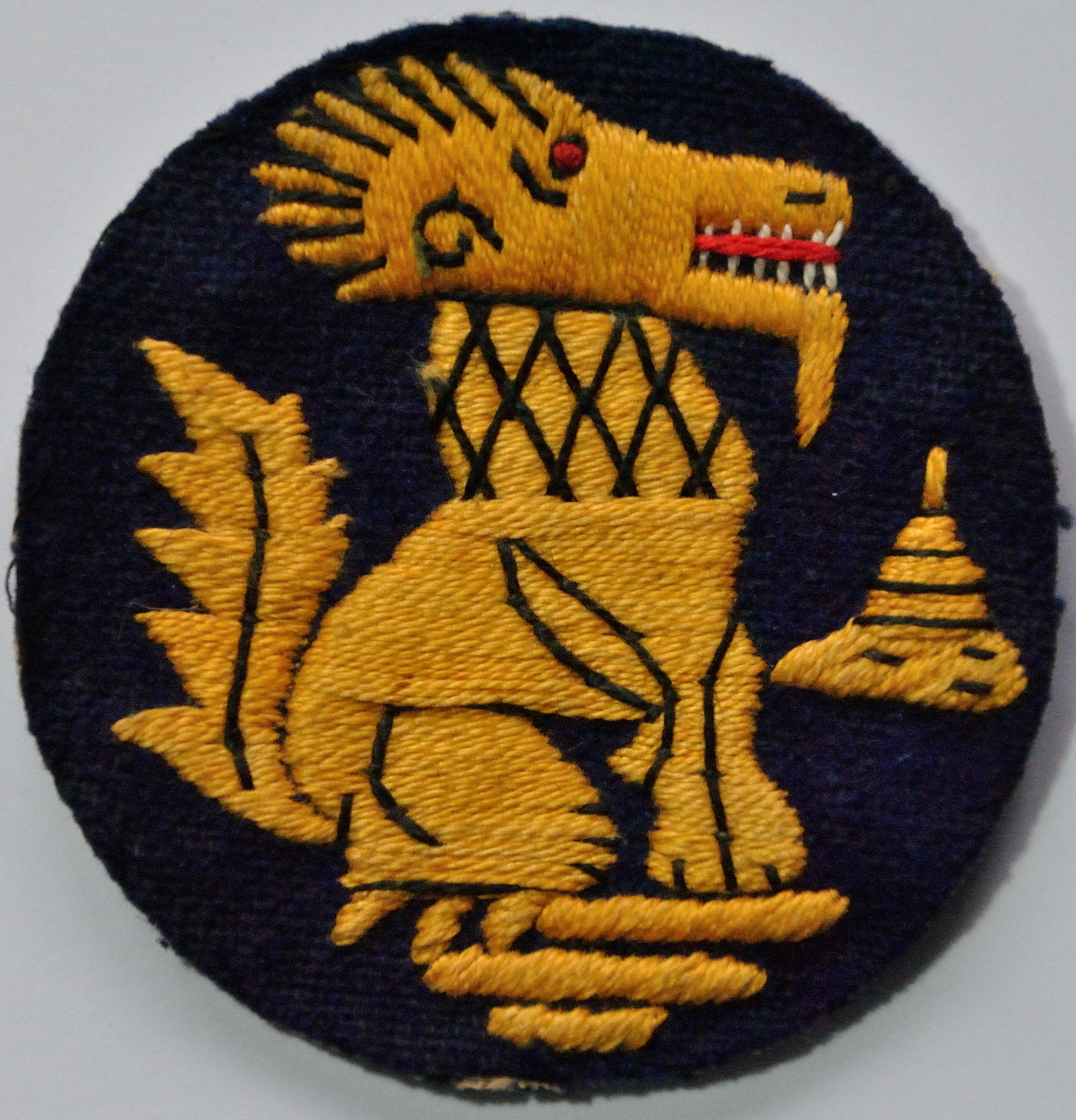
- Formation sign of the Chindits (also known as the 3rd Indian Infantry Division)

The Chindits, officially known as Long Range Penetration Groups, were special operations units of the British and Indian armies which saw action in 1943–1944 during the Burma Campaign of World War II. Brigadier (later Major-General) Orde Wingate formed them for long-range penetration operations against the Imperial Japanese Army, especially attacking lines of communication deep behind Japanese lines.

The name Chindits is a corrupted form of Chinthe (Burmese: ခြင်္သေ့), the Burmese word for "lion".

Their operations featured long marches through extremely difficult terrain, undertaken by underfed troops often weakened by diseases such as malaria and dysentery. Controversy persists over the extremely high casualty rate and, despite results – such as the reallocation of an entire Japanese division and part of a second to deal with the Chindits – debate about the military value of special forces operations continued post-war.

== Background and formation ==
During the East African Campaign of 1940–41, Wingate – under General Archibald Wavell, Commander-in-Chief of the Middle East Command – had begun to explore guerilla tactics, when he created and commanded a unit known as Gideon Force, composed of regular troops from Sudan and Ethiopia, as well as Ethiopean partisans. Gideon Force disrupted Italian supply lines and collected intelligence.

In 1942, after the disbandment of Gideon Force, Wavell – who had since been appointed Commander-in-Chief, India in New Delhi – requested the services of Wingate in Burma. It was intended that he would raise irregular forces to operate behind the Japanese lines, in a manner similar to Gideon Force. Wingate arrived in Burma in March 1942 and for two months, as Japanese forces advanced rapidly, toured the country developing his theories of long-range penetration, during the two months preceding the Japanese conquest of Burma. After returning to Delhi, he presented his proposals to Wavell.

=== Organisation and training ===
The first Chindit unit, the 77th Indian Infantry Brigade, was gradually formed in the area around Jhansi in the summer of 1942. Wingate took charge of the training of the troops in the jungles of central India during the rainy season. Half of the Chindits were British: the 13th Battalion, the King's Liverpool Regiment (nominally a second-line battalion, which contained a large number of older men) and men from the former Bush Warfare School in Burma, who were formed into 142 Commando Company. The other portion of the force consisted of the 3rd Battalion, the 2nd Gurkha Rifles (a battalion that had only just been raised) and the 2nd Battalion, the Burma Rifles (a composite unit formed from several depleted battalions of Burmese troops that had retreated into India in 1942).

Wingate trained this force as long-range penetration units that were to be supplied by stores parachuted or dropped from transport aircraft and were to use close air support as a substitute for heavy artillery. They would penetrate the jungle on foot, essentially relying on surprise through mobility to target enemy lines of communication (a tactic that the Japanese had previously used in 1942 to great effect against British forces in Malaya and Burma).

The standard brigade and battalion structures were abandoned. The force was instead formed into eight columns, each of which was organised as: an infantry rifle company (with nine Bren light machine guns and three 2-inch mortars); a support group with the heavy weapons (four Boys anti-tank rifles, two medium Vickers machine guns and two light anti-aircraft guns); a reconnaissance platoon from the Burma Rifles; and a sabotage group from 142 Commando Company. Small detachments from the Royal Air Force (equipped with radios to call in air support), Royal Corps of Signals and Royal Army Medical Corps were attached to the column headquarters. The heavy weapons, radios, reserve ammunition, and rations and other stores were carried on mules, which would also provide an emergency source of food once their loads had been depleted. With 57 mule handlers, each British column numbered 306 men (the Gurkha columns were slightly stronger, with 369 men).

Each man carried more than 72 pounds (33 kg) of equipment, which was proportionally more than the mules carrying the support weapons and other stores. This included a personal weapon, such as the SMLE rifle or Sten Gun, ammunition, grenades, a machete or Gurkha kukri knife, seven days' rations, groundsheet, change of uniform and other assorted items. Much of this load was carried in an Everest carrier, which was essentially a metal rucksack frame without a pack.

Shortly before the first operation, one column was broken up to bring the remaining seven up to full strength. Two or more columns were commanded by a group headquarters, which in turn was commanded by the brigade headquarters.

== Operation Longcloth ==
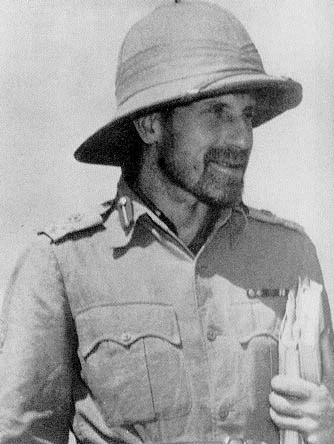
Brigadier Orde Wingate

The original intent had been to use the Chindits as a part of a larger offensive. When this offensive was cancelled, Wingate convinced General Wavell to send the Chindits into Burma anyway. Accordingly, on 8 February 1943, Operation Longcloth commenced and 3,000 Chindits, Wingate with them, began their march into Burma.

The Chindits crossed the Chindwin River on 13 February, and faced their first Japanese troops two days later. Two columns marched to the south, and received their air supply drops in broad daylight, to create an impression that they were to mount the main attack; reinforcing their unit's apparent threat with a man impersonating a British general. The Royal Air Force mounted aerial attacks on Japanese targets, to support this deception. These columns were to swing east at the beginning of March, to attack the main north-south railway, in areas south of the main force. One column successfully carried out demolitions along the railway, though the other was ambushed, losing half of its personnel, and returning to India.

Five further columns proceeded eastward. Two (those of Michael Calvert and Bernard Fergusson) proceeded towards the main north-south railway in Burma. On 4 March, Calvert's column reached the valley, and demolished the railway in 70 places. Fergusson arrived two days later, doing much the same. Despite these successes, however, the railway was only temporarily disabled, and resumed operation shortly afterward.

On many occasions, the Chindits could not take their wounded with them; some were left behind, in villages. Wingate had issued specific orders to leave behind all wounded (though these orders were not strictly followed). Since there were often no established paths in their jungle routes, many times they had to clear their own, with machetes, kukris (and, on one occasion, a commandeered elephant). Supply was delivered by air, using three Hudsons and three Dakotas of the RAF's 31 Squadron, operating from Agartala in eastern Bengal.

Once in Burma, Wingate repeatedly changed his plans, sometimes without informing all the column commanders. The majority of two of the columns marched back to India, after being ambushed by the Japanese, in separate actions. After the railway attacks, Wingate decided to cross his force over the Irrawaddy River. However, the area on the other side of the river turned out to be inhospitable to operations. Water was difficult to obtain and the combination of rivers with a good system of roads in the area allowed the Japanese to force the Chindits into a progressively smaller "box".

In late March, Wingate made the decision to withdraw the majority of the force, but sent orders to one of the columns to continue eastward. The operations had reached the range limit of air supply and prospects for new successful operations were low, given the Japanese pressure. The columns were generally left to make their own way back to India. On the journey back, the most difficult actions involved crossing back over the Irrawaddy River. The Japanese had observers and patrols all along the river bank and could quickly concentrate once an attempt at a crossing was detected. Gradually, all the columns broke up into small groups. Wingate's headquarters returned to India on its own ahead of most of the columns. Through the spring and even into the autumn of 1943, individual groups of men from the Chindits made their way back to India. The army did what they could for the men. In one case, an aeroplane was landed in an open area and wounded men were evacuated by air. Part of one column made it to China. Another body of men escaped into the far north of Burma. Others were captured or died.

By the end of April, after a three-month mission, the majority of the surviving Chindits had crossed the Chindwin river, having marched between 750–1,000 miles. Of the 3,000 men that had begun the operation, a third (818 men) had been killed, taken prisoner, or died of disease, and of the 2,182 men who returned, about 600 were too debilitated from their wounds or disease to return to active service. Of the remaining men, Wingate practically hand picked those few he would retain, while the rest were put back under the normal army command structure as part of their original battalions.

== Interlude ==
Although British Army officers in India criticised the effectiveness of the Chindits (Japanese railway communications had been out of commission for less than a week), their effect on the morale of the Allied troops in India was refreshing, and they were given plenty of publicity.

Wingate wrote an operations report on returning to India, which was controversial for many reasons, including attacks on officers under his command. The report had a tendency to excuse any mistakes made by its author (Wingate), while making vicious attacks on other officers, often based on limited information. Eventually, through his political allies in London, a copy of the report was given to Winston Churchill, who was impressed and took Wingate with him to the Quebec Conference. His concepts for long-range penetration operations behind Japanese lines received official backing at high level, and he obtained substantial US support for his force. The US Army also began its own plans for the group that later became Merrill's Marauders.

As the members of the first expedition were making their way back to India, a second long range penetration unit, 111th Indian Infantry Brigade was being formed. Popularly known as The Leopards, the brigade was raised by General Wavell without the knowledge of Wingate, who was still in Burma and who was known to have a strong dislike for the Indian Army, its diverse troop formations, and its British officers in particular. Wavell personally selected the commander of 111th Brigade, Brigadier Joe Lentaigne.

Wavell intended to use two Chindit brigades alternately during 1944. While one brigade was operating behind Japanese lines for two to three months at a time, the other would be resting in India, while training for and planning the next operation. However, Wingate returned from Quebec with authority to implement far more ambitious plans for the second expedition, which required that the force be greatly expanded to a strength of six brigades. Wingate refused to use Indian Army units in this force, because he maintained that their training in long-range penetration techniques would take longer and their maintenance by air would be difficult due to the varied dietary requirements of different Gurkha and Indian castes and religions, although he had little choice but to accept 111th Brigade, and two Gurkha battalions in 77th brigade. Since large numbers of trained British infantry were required, three brigades (the 14th, 16th and 23rd) were added to the Chindits by breaking up the experienced British 70th Infantry Division, much against the wishes of Lieutenant General William Slim and other commanders, who wished to use the division in a conventional role. A sixth brigade was added to the force by taking a brigade (the 3rd (West African) Infantry Brigade) from the British 81st (West Africa) Division.

At Quebec, Wingate had also succeeded in obtaining a "private" air force for the Chindits, the 1st Air Commando Group, mainly consisting of USAAF aircraft. The Chindits were greatly encouraged by having aircraft on which they could call immediately for supply drops, casualty evacuation and air support. Other welcome American aid was the "K" Ration pack which, although it provided insufficient calories for prolonged active operations, was far better than the equivalent British or Indian ration pack.

The forces for the second Chindit operation were called Special Force, officially 3rd Indian Infantry Division, or Long Range Penetration Groups, but the nickname, the Chindits, had already stuck.

The new Chindit force commenced training in Gwalior. Men were trained in crossing rivers, demolitions and bivouacking. Calvert and Fergusson, both newly promoted to Brigadier, took command of two of the brigades, and were responsible for much of the training program and the development of tactical planning. Wingate himself was absent for much of the training period, first being out of the country to attend the Quebec Conference and then struck ill with typhoid from drinking bad water in North Africa on his return.

=== Plans ===
The plans for the second Chindit operation went through many revisions.

The methods of the new Long Range Penetration force in 1944 differed from those of 1943. Wingate had decided on a strategy of creating fortified bases behind the Japanese lines, which would then send out raiding columns over short distances. This change was in part forced on him by strengthened Japanese patrols along the Burmese frontier, making a repeat of the successful infiltration in 1943 unlikely. In an imaginative move prompted by Colonel Philip Cochran's assurance that he could transport both troops and supplies by glider, Wingate arranged for the bulk of the force to enter Burma by air, greatly accelerating the force's ability to reach its target objectives. Advance units would land in gliders in preselected open fields in Burma, and prepare them for large-scale landings by transport aircraft. The lavish air support provided by Colonels Cochran and Alison of the 1st Air Commando Group proved critical to the success of the operation.

Wingate also had plans for a general uprising of the Kachin population of Northern Burma. He fought over these plans with the leadership of Force 136 (an organisation set up to liaise with resistance forces in Japanese-occupied countries), which was concerned that a premature uprising of the Kachins without a permanent British military presence would lead to their slaughter by the Japanese at the end of operations. Force 136 also had their own plans for a rising to be coordinated with the arrival of the regular army in Burma. Wingate was eventually convinced to scale back his original plans. (Note: See British National Archives HS1/2 – Most Secret & personal from head of SOE India to 'P' Division SEAC & GHQ India March 10, 1944 – Military Operations in the Dilwyn Area B/B.100 to head of SOE India March 11, 1944. For the Chindit side see the Operational Report of Dah Force (Imperial War Museum)) Further complicating relations between the organisations were orders issued by Wingate to the commander of Dah Force (a British-led force of Kachin irregulars attached to the Chindits) not to coordinate operations with Force 136 for security reasons.

During the last months of 1943, planning was conducted to carry out the strategy for India as originally determined at the Quebec Conference. In November, the overall plan for the dry season campaign of 1944 determined by South East Asia Command focused on the use of the Chindits in the reconquest of northern Burma. These plans were approved by the Combined Chiefs of Staff at the Cairo Conference and although other offensives in Burma were scaled back or cancelled, Stilwell's Northern Front offensive with the Chindits' participation survived the cuts. (Note: The Cairo Conference changed some of the original plans, but did not affect the plans to use the Chindits to interdict the Japanese 18th Division's supply lines (Slim 1956, p. 214).) The uncertainty of the plans nevertheless meant that the plans and contingency plans for the use of the Chindits repeatedly changed up to the very start of operations.

The Chindits were assigned the task of helping the forces of Joseph Stilwell push the Ledo Road through northern Burma to link up with the Burma Road and re-establish an overland supply route to China, by mounting a long range penetration operation behind the Japanese opposing his forces on the Northern Front. It had originally been intended that the IV Corps would attack on the Central Front and cross the Chindwin to tie up Japanese forces which could otherwise be used to aid the Northern Front. As the Japanese launched their own attack on the Central Front this advance did not take place, but it still meant that most Japanese forces were engaged on the Central Front and were not available to reinforce the Japanese 18th Division on the Northern Front. The Japanese offensive on the Central Front resulted in further proposals and refinements of the plans for the Chindits.

On 4 February 1944, Lieutenant General Slim, commander of the British Fourteenth Army, and USAAF General George E. Stratemeyer, commander of Eastern Air Command, issued a joint directive to General Wingate and Cols. Cochran and Alison of the 1st Air Commando Group, to march and fly into Indaw and from there under the command of the Fourteenth Army carry out the objectives of:

(i) Helping the advance of Stilwell's Ledo force on Myitkyina by cutting the communications of the Japanese 18th Division, harassing its rear, and preventing its reinforcement.
(ii) Creating a favourable situation for the Yunnan Chinese forces to cross the Salween and enter Burma.
(iii) Inflicting the greatest possible damage and confusion on the enemy in North Burma.

== Operation Thursday ==
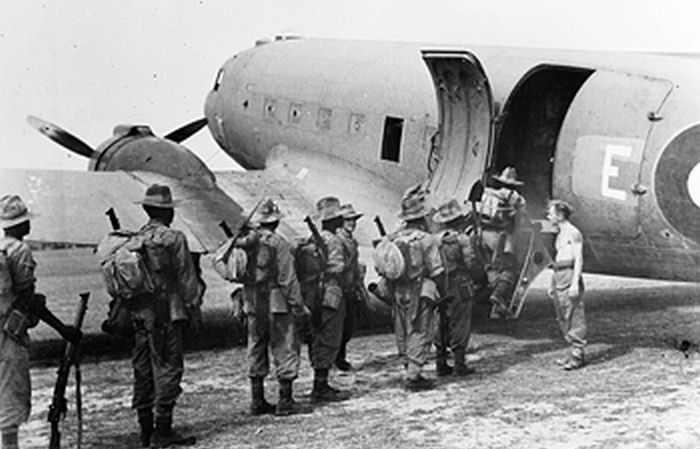
Troops of the Nigeria Regiment, 3rd West African Brigade (Thunder), board an RAF Dakota

On 5 February 1944, Fergusson's 16th Brigade left Ledo for Burma. They avoided Japanese forces by traversing exceptionally difficult terrain. The rest of the Brigades were brought in by air to create fortified bases with airstrips.

Three landing zones, codenamed Piccadilly, Broadway and Chowringhee, were selected. Calvert's 77th Brigade prepared to fly by Hadrian glider into Piccadilly on the night of 5 March. A last-minute aerial reconnaissance revealed Piccadilly to be covered with logs, making landing impossible. In some accounts of the incident, Wingate insisted that the operation had been betrayed and that the other landing zones would be ambushed. To proceed would be "murder". Slim accepted the responsibility of ordering a willing Calvert to proceed with the operation, using Broadway instead. While Piccadilly had already been used to evacuate casualties during the first Chindit operation in 1943, Broadway had to be selected from the results of aerial reconnaissance. It turned out to be a poor landing ground and there were many casualties in crash landings, but Calvert's men were just able to make the strip fit to take transport aircraft the next day. Chindit gliders also landed on Chowringhee the next day, without opposition.

It was later revealed that the logs on Piccadilly had been placed there to dry by Burmese teak loggers. The real problem was the failure to maintain continuous observation of the landing zones (e.g. by high-flying Spitfire photo-reconnaissance aircraft) before the forces were deployed.

Over the next week, 600 sorties by Dakota transport aircraft transferred 9,000 men to the landing zones. Chowringhee was abandoned once the fly-in was completed, but Broadway was held with a garrison which included field artillery, anti-aircraft guns and even a detachment of six Mk.VIII Spitfires of No.81 Squadron RAF from 12 March to 17 March. On 17 March they were attacked during take-off by Japanese Ki-43 'Oscars'. S/L William 'Babe' Whitamore and F/O Alan M Peart managed to get airborne, with both shooting down one 'Oscar' each. Whitamore was shot down and killed but Peart survived for over half an hour, holding off over 20 enemy fighters. The remaining Spitfires were destroyed on the ground for the loss of another pilot, F/Lt Coulter. Peart flew back to Kangla the same day in his damaged Spitfire (FL-E JF818) and reported the action. The detachment was duly ended by AVM Stanley Vincent, the CO of No. 221 Group.

Fergusson's brigade set up another base named Aberdeen north of Indaw, into which 14th Brigade was flown. Calvert's brigade established yet another, named White City at Mawlu, astride the main railway and road leading to the Japanese northern front. 111 Brigade set up ambushes and roadblocks south of Indaw (although part of the brigade which landed at Chowringhee was delayed in crossing the Irrawaddy River), before moving west to Pinlebu.

Ferocious jungle fighting ensued around Broadway and White City. At times, British and Japanese troops were in close combat, bayonets and kukris against katanas. On 27 March, after days of aircraft attack, the Japanese attacked Broadway for several nights before the attack was repulsed with flown-in artillery and the aid of locally recruited Kachin irregulars.

However, a setback occurred when Fergusson's brigade tried to capture Indaw on 24 March. The original intention had been to seize the town and its airfields on 15 March but Fergusson had to report that this was impossible. Wingate appeared ready to change the brigade's mission but on 20 March, he reinstated Indaw as the target. (Note: Shelford Bidwell speculated that Wingate had revived at short notice a plan codenamed Operation Tarzan, by which the Indian 26th Infantry Division would fly into the captured airfields, even though this division was already heavily engaged in the Arakan (Bidwell 1979, p. 138).) The brigade was already exhausted from its long march, and there was no time to properly reconnoitre the objective. The units were dismayed to find that the Japanese controlled the only water sources. Fergusson expected that 14th Brigade would cooperate in the attack, but they moved west instead. Japanese reinforcements had also moved into Indaw, which was a major road and rail centre. Fergusson's battalions, attacking separately, were each repulsed. Calvert later commented "They had attacked as clutching fingers from all sides, and not as a fist". After this, most of the tired 16th Brigade were flown out.

=== Change of command ===
On 24 March, Wingate flew to Imphal to confer with air force commanders. On the return journey, the USAAF B-25 bomber in which he was flying is believed to have flown into a thunderstorm and crashed in the jungle-covered mountains. All aboard were killed.

Slim, the commander of the Fourteenth Army which had loose operational control over Special Force, selected Brigadier Lentaigne to be Wingate's replacement after conferring with Brigadier Derek Tulloch, Wingate's Chief of Staff. Lentaigne was judged to be the most balanced and experienced commander in the force; he had been an instructor at the Staff College at Quetta, had led a Gurkha battalion with distinction during the gruelling retreat from Burma in 1942 and had commanded a Chindit brigade in the field (albeit for only a few weeks, but none of the other brigade commanders had more experience). As an officer of Gurkha troops, he had a similar outlook and background to Slim. The other Chindit brigade commanders were unknown quantities, mostly without staff qualifications, some of whom had never even commanded a battalion-sized unit in combat before 1944, and Wingate's staff officers lacked the necessary combat experience. The force's second-in-command, Major General George William Symes, was bypassed by Slim and formally protested and asked to be relieved. In selecting Lentaigne, Slim did not take into account the tensions between those Chindit commanders and staff who were closely associated with Wingate, and Lentaigne, who had a classical "line" officer's background and had been critical of Wingate's methods and techniques.

=== The move north ===
Several major changes were made at the highest level. Much of the air support was diverted to the critical battles of Imphal and Kohima, where troops were cut off and could only be resupplied by air. 23rd Brigade, yet to fly in, was also despatched to Kohima. Those Chindits already operating in Burma were formally subordinated to General Joseph Stilwell, who ordered the Chindits to abandon their dispersed operations around Indaw, and concentrate on interdicting the supply lines to the Japanese forces opposing his Northern Combat Area Command.

In April, Lentaigne ordered the main body of 111 Brigade west of the Irrawaddy, now commanded by John Masters, to move north and build a new stronghold, codenamed Blackpool, which would block the railway and main road at Hopin, 30 miles (48 km) south of Mogaung. Calvert was ordered to abandon White City and Broadway and move north to support Masters. Calvert was opposed to this, as his brigade had successfully held these two strongholds for months. Stilwell also feared that abandoning White City would allow Japanese reinforcements to move north. However, Lentaigne insisted that the Chindit brigades were too far apart to support each other, and that the airstrips at White City and Broadway would be unusable during the monsoon.

Masters's force established Blackpool on 8 May and was almost immediately engaged in fierce fighting. Whereas White City had been deep in the Japanese rear, its defenders had had plenty of time to prepare their defences and its attackers had been a mixed bag of detachments from several formations, Blackpool was close to the Japanese northern front, and was immediately attacked by Japanese troops with heavy artillery support. As Calvert and Stilwell had feared, abandoning White City had allowed the Japanese 53rd Division to move north from Indaw. A heavy attack against Blackpool was repulsed on 17 May, but a second attack on 24 May captured vital positions inside the defences.

Because the monsoon had broken and heavy rain made movement in the jungle very difficult, neither Calvert nor Brodie's 14th Brigade could help Masters. Finally, Masters had to abandon Blackpool on 25 May, because the men were exhausted after 17 days of continual combat. Nineteen Allied soldiers, who were so badly injured as to be beyond hope of recovery and could not be moved, were shot by the medical orderlies and hidden in heavy stands of bamboo.

=== Final operations ===
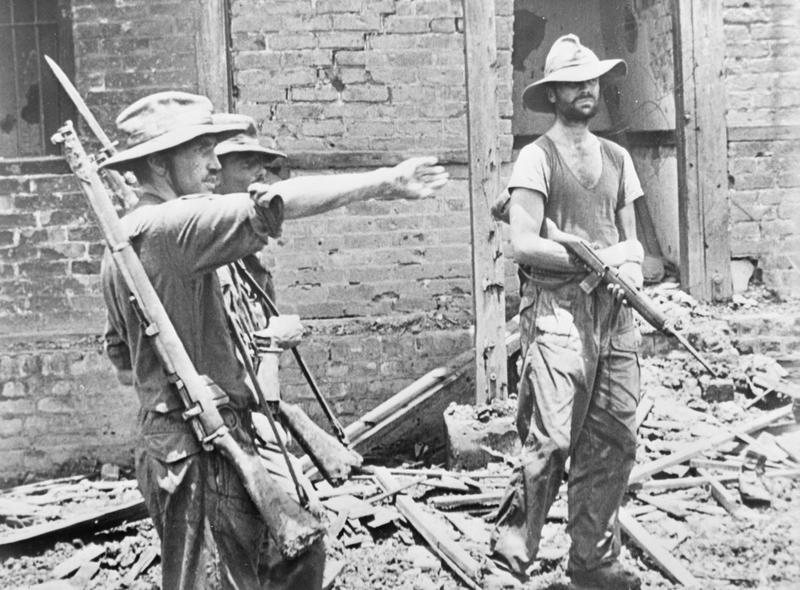
Brigadier "Mad" Mike Calvert giving orders after the capture of Mogaung

On 17 May, Slim had formally handed control of the Chindits to Stilwell. Stilwell insisted that the Chindits capture several well-defended Japanese positions. The Chindits had no support from tanks or artillery and this led to heavier casualties than before. According to David Rooney, the Chindits were misused under Stillwell's command and suffered heavy casualties undertaking roles for which they were neither trained nor equipped.

From 6 June to 27 June, Calvert's 77th Brigade took Mogaung and suffered 800 casualties; 50 per cent of the brigade's men involved in the operation. Fearing that they would then be ordered to join the siege of Myitkyina, Calvert handed Mogaung over to Force X, shut down his radios and retreated to Kamaing, where Stilwell had his headquarters. A court-martial was likely until Stilwell and Calvert met in person, and Stilwell finally appreciated the conditions under which the Chindits had been operating.

111 Brigade, after resting, was ordered to capture a hill south west of Mogaung, known as Point 2171. It did so but was now utterly exhausted. Most of the men were suffering from malaria, dysentery and malnutrition. On 8 July, at the insistence of the Supreme Commander, Admiral Louis Mountbatten, doctors examined the brigade. Of the 2,200 men present from four and a half battalions, only 119 were declared fit. The brigade was evacuated, although Masters sarcastically kept the fit men, "111 Company", in the field until 1 August.

The portion of 111 Brigade east of the Irrawaddy were known as Morris Force, after its commander, Lieutenant-Colonel J. R. "Jumbo" Morris. They had spent several months harassing Japanese traffic from Bhamo to Myitkyina. They had then attempted to complete the encirclement of Myitkyina. Stilwell was angered that they were unable to do so but Slim pointed out that Stilwell's Chinese troops (numbering 5,500) had also failed. By 14 July, Morris Force was down to three platoons. A week later, they only had 25 men fit for duty. Morris Force was evacuated about the same time as the 77th Brigade.

The 14th Brigade and the 3rd West African Brigade remained in action, assisting the newly arrived 36th Infantry Division in its advance down the "Railway Valley" south of Mogaung. Finally, they were relieved and withdrawn, starting on 17 August. The last Chindit left Burma on 27 August 1944.

=== Kohima ===
23rd Brigade, which had been diverted from the main Chindit campaign, nevertheless acted as a long range penetration unit behind the Japanese fighting at Kohima. From April to June 1944, they marched long distances through the Naga hills, mostly in monsoon weather which made movement very difficult. They contributed in large measure to the starvation of the Japanese at Kohima, the decisive factor in that battle. Although not engaged in major battles, they accounted for large numbers of Japanese stragglers and foragers, suffering 158 battle casualties themselves.

== Disbanded ==
The Chindits had suffered heavy casualties: 1,396 killed and 2,434 wounded. Over half had to be confined to hospital and prescribed a special nutritional diet whilst hospitalised. As bad as the casualty figures may seem, those suffered by the force in 1943 were proportionally much higher.

The healthy men were sent to training camps to await new operations. However, when the army command evaluated the men and equipment required to return the Chindits to operational status, it was decided to transform the force into an Airborne Division in India. Beyond direct replacements, it was known that the British element of the Chindits would be decimated in 1945 by the need to repatriate personnel who had served more than four years overseas.

During the early months of 1945, several of the brigade headquarters and many of the veterans of the Chindit operations were reformed into the 14th and 77th Infantry Brigades and merged into the 44th Airborne Division (India), while the force headquarters and signals units formed the core of the Indian XXXIV Corps. The Chindits were finally disbanded in February 1945.

== London memorial ==
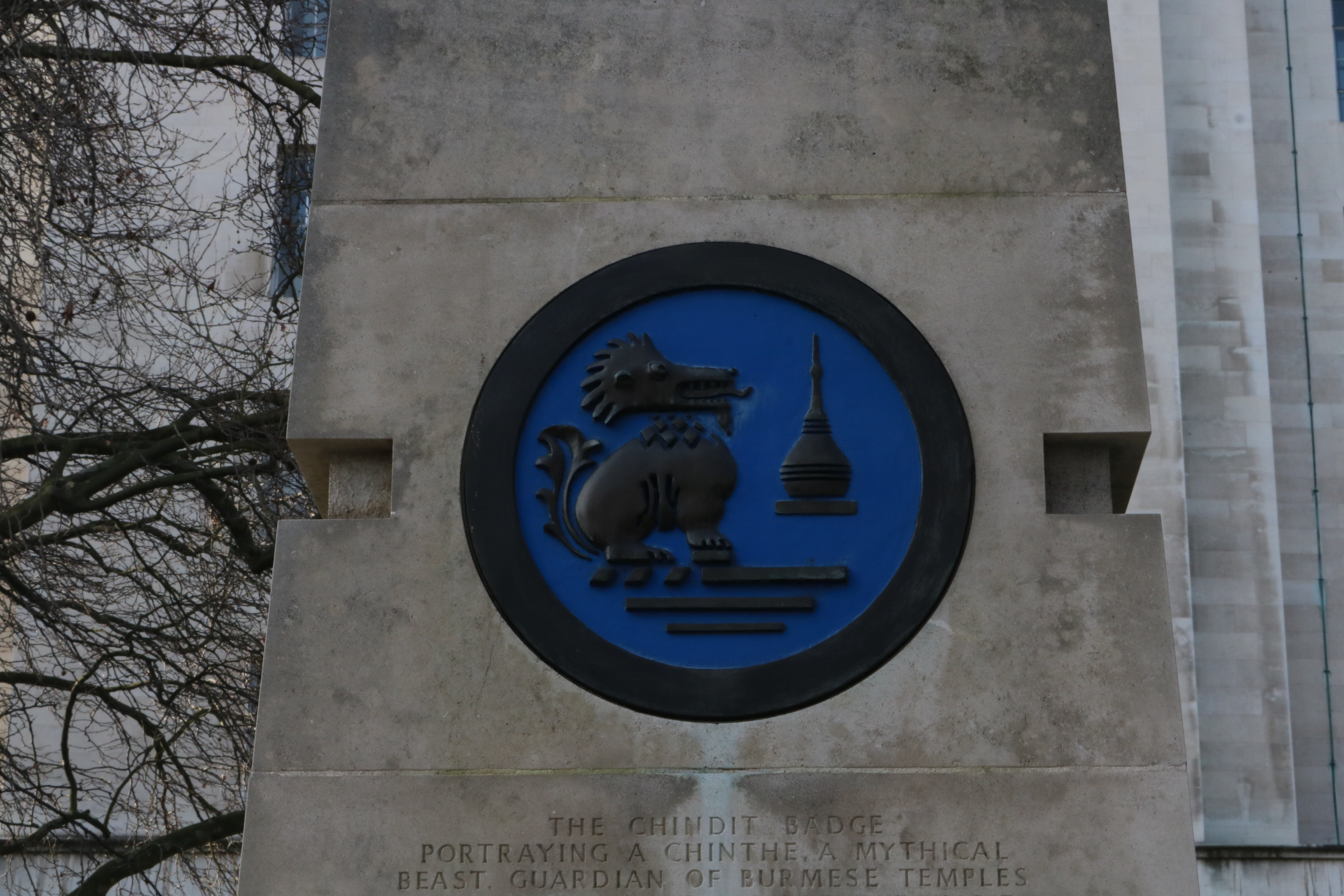
Badge of the Chindits on their memorial outside the Ministry of Defence building in London

There is a memorial to Orde Wingate and the Chindits on the north side of the Victoria Embankment next to the Ministry of Defence headquarters in London. The memorial was unveiled on 16 October 1990 by the Prince Philip, Duke of Edinburgh. The front of the monument is in memory of the Chindits and also mentions the four men of the Chindits awarded the Victoria Cross: Major Frank Blaker, Captain Michael Allmand and Lieutenant George Albert Cairns and Rifleman Tulbahadur Pun. The battalions that took part are listed on the sides of the monument. Non-infantry units are mentioned by their parent formations only. No distinction is made between those units that took part in 1943 versus those of 1944. The rear of the monument is exclusively dedicated to Orde Wingate and also mentions his contributions to Israel. The memorial is a 4 metre (13 ft) high Portland stone pillar mounted on three steps, on which is a statue by Frank Forster of the chinthe, after which the Chindits are named.

== Military legacy ==
Military historians disagree on the Chindits' military significance. The debate is part of the ongoing one of whether deployment of special forces is a net asset to a campaign or whether the investments in time, material and men that such operations demand outweigh the advantages gained. For example, it is questioned whether the interdiction of Japanese supply lines during Operation Thursday by the Chindits contributed more to Stilwell's advance than if the resources committed to the operation had been used to provide Stilwell with another regular division to fight alongside his X Force. However, the Japanese subsequently admitted that the Chindits had disrupted their plans for the first half of 1943. Japanese commander Mutaguchi Renya later stated that Operation Thursday had a significant effect on the campaign, saying "The Chindit invasion ... had a decisive effect on these operations ... they drew off the whole of 53 Division and parts of 15 Division, one regiment of which would have turned the scales at Kohima."

The views of the majority of the post-war British military establishment were made known succinctly by Slim (commander of the Fourteenth Army), when he wrote

"... the Chindits, gave a splendid example of courage and hardihood. Yet I came firmly to the conclusion that such formations, trained, equipped and mentally adjusted for one kind of operation were wasteful. They did not give, militarily, a worth-while return for the resources in men, materiel and time that they absorbed. ... [Special forces] were usually formed by attracting the best men ... The result of these methods was undoubtedly to lower the quality of the rest of the Army".

He makes several other arguments against special forces, about the danger of ordinary battalions thinking that some tasks could only be performed by special forces, and that special forces can only stay in the field for relatively short periods compared to regular battalions. He sums up that "Anything, whatever the short cuts to victory it may promise, which thus weakens the Army spirit is dangerous". To underline his point he suggests that "This cult of special forces is as sensible as to form a Royal Corps of Tree Climbers and say that no soldier, who does not wear its green hat with a bunch of oak leaves stuck in it should be expected to climb a tree". He does acknowledge the need for small units to stir up trouble in the enemy's rear area but does not make it clear if he is talking about V Force or the actions of Force 136.

Others, like Sir Robert Thompson, an ex-Chindit, have asserted that the idea behind the Chindits was a sound one but that they were just badly handled and used in operations for which they were not properly equipped or trained, for example in static defence. A third view is that the Chindits' propaganda value, although they inflicted relatively insignificant losses upon the Japanese, nonetheless provided a morale boost to the people of India and Britain, helping to dispel the image of Japanese invincibility at a time when the Allies were on the defensive. It has been hard to reach a consensus on any of these issues due to the partisan nature of the discussions surrounding Wingate.

It has also been argued that the Chindits contributed to the overall success of the Allied armies in Burma through the innovations in air supply techniques and organisation that their operations required. The Allied air forces were later to use these tactics to supply increasingly large forces that were cut off by the enemy, or were operating independently of road or rail lines of communication. Conversely, it has been argued that the apparent success of the Chindits led some Japanese commanders to believe that they could employ their own incursion tactics on a much larger scale, and that when they came to implement such tactics during the Chindwin offensive of early 1944, lacking the necessary air support that had enabled the Allies to be successful, the result was disastrous and ultimately led to defeat at both Kohima and Imphal, and later on the plains of Burma in 1945.

Three of the Brigade commanders on Operation Thursday (two of whom had also served in the first Chindit expedition) subsequently wrote autobiographies, which contained their comments on the Chindits' concept and practice of operations. Bernard Fergusson, originally an enthusiastic supporter of Wingate, later came to feel that Wingate lacked both consistency and flexibility in his plans, which contributed to Fergusson's long, pointless march from Ledo and his defeat at Indaw. John Masters, who was a friend of Lentaigne, felt that the Chindits' mobility was sacrificed in holding fixed defensive positions or attacking strong Japanese positions, without the necessary support. In criticism of the whole Chindit concept, he pointed out that the Chindit force had the infantry strength of two and a half line divisions but, without supporting arms, had the fighting strength of less than one. Michael Calvert, who was closest to Wingate, remained a defender of Wingate and his methods.

The 77th Brigade, raised in 2015 to engage in propaganda for the army, was named in tribute to the Chindits.

== See also ==
- Denis Edward Arnold MC
- Roland Degg
- Order of Battle of the Chindits
