= Safe-life design =

Safety principle in transport engineering

In safe-life design, products are intended to be removed from service at a specific design life.

Safe-life is particularly relevant to simple metal aircraft, where airframe components are subjected to alternating loads over the lifetime of the aircraft which makes them susceptible to metal fatigue. In certain areas such as in wing or tail components, structural failure in flight would be catastrophic.

The safe-life design technique is employed in critical systems which are either very difficult to repair or whose failure may cause severe damage to life and property. These systems are designed to work for years without requirement of any repairs.

The disadvantage of the safe-life design philosophy is that serious assumptions must be made regarding the alternating loads imposed on the aircraft, so if those assumptions prove to be inaccurate, cracks may commence prior to the component being removed from service. To counter this disadvantage, alternative design philosophies like fail-safe design and fault-tolerant design were developed.

== The automotive industry ==
One way the safe-life approach is planning and envisaging the toughness of the mechanisms in the automotive industry. When the repetitive loading on mechanical structures intensified with the advent of the steam engine, back in the mid-1800s, this approach was established (Oja 2013). According to Michael Oja, “Engineers and academics began to understand the effect that cyclic stress (or strain) has on the life of a component; a curve was developed relating the magnitude of the cyclic stress (S) to the logarithm of the number of cycles to failure (N)” (Oja 2013). The S-N curve because the fundamental relation is in safe life designs. The curve is reliant on many conditions, including the ratio of maximum load to minimum load (R-ratio), the type of material being inspected, and the regularity at which the cyclic stresses (or strains) are applied. Today, the curve is still consequential by experimentally testing laboratory specimens at many continuous cyclic load levels, and detecting the number of cycles to failure (Oja 2013). Michael Oja states that, “Unsurprisingly, as the load decreases, the life of the specimen increases” (Oja 2013). The practical limit of experimental challenges has been due to frequency confines of hydraulic-powered test machines. The load at which this high-cycle life happens has come to be recognized as the fatigue asset of the material (Oja 2013).

== Aerospace ==
=== Aircraft structure ===
There are two generic types of aircraft structure, safe-life and fail-safe. The former is one that has low residual strength if a primary load-bearing member should fail, whereas the latter has alternative load paths so that if a primary load-bearing member cracks, residual strength remains because the loads can be assumed by adjacent members. In modern aircraft, fail-safe structures with up to three alternative load paths are provided, but back in 1947 the main load-bearing structure was safe life. This did not matter on an interim airframe designed for operations in the calm upper air, but at around 500 ft the loads and stresses were more volatile.

=== Helicopter structure ===
The safe-life design philosophy is applied to all helicopter structures. In the current generation of Army helicopters, such as the UH-60 Black Hawk, composite materials make up as great as 17 percent of the airframe and rotor weight (Reddick). Harold Reddick states that, “With the advent of major helicopter composite structures R&D projects, such as the Advanced Composite Airframe Program (ACAP), and Manufacturing Methods and Technology (MM&T) projects, such as UH-60 Low Cost Composite Blade Program, it is estimated that within a few years composite materials could be applied to as much as 80% of the airframe and rotor weight of a helicopter in a production program” (Reddick). Along with this application, it is the essential obligation that sound, definitive design criteria be industrialized in order that the composite structures have high fatigue lives for economy of ownership and good damage tolerance for flight safety. Safe-life and damage-tolerant criteria are practical to all helicopter flight critical components (Reddick).

== See also ==
- Fail-safe
- Fault-tolerant design
- Safety engineering
- Damage tolerance
- 1945 Australian National Airways Stinson crash
