= Steve Dehler =

American politician and businessman

Steve Dehler (born March 21, 1950) is an American politician and businessman.

Born in St. Cloud, Minnesota, Dehler attended the College of Saint Benedict and Saint John's University where he studied accounting and economics. He was a retail grocer/correctional officer/dispatcher. He served on the St. Joseph, Minnesota city council and as mayor. From 1993 to 2002, he served in the Minnesota House of Representatives as a Republican. In 2012, he lost a primary election for Hennepin County, Minnesota commissioner. His uncle, Sylvester Uphus, and a cousin, Ken Otremba, also served in the Minnesota Legislature, the former as an Independent Republican, and the latter as a Democrat.
