= Denis Edward Arnold =

British army officer

Denis Arnold

Denis Edward Arnold MC (16 July 1918 – 14 January 2015) was a British Army officer of the Second World War who won the Military Cross in 1944 for an opportunistic attack on a Japanese force while serving with the Chindits in Burma. Arnold served in the Royal Welch Fusiliers and the 7th Nigeria Regiment, Royal West African Frontier Force. While in Burma, Arnold received a letter from his mother containing a pledge card that he would abstain from alcohol. He and his comrades found this very amusing since there was none to be found in the jungle. On returning to England with a bottle of whisky that he was saving for a celebration, Arnold was told by a customs officer that he must pay duty on the spirit. He smashed the bottle in disgust. After leaving the army, Arnold rejoined his former employers the Blue Circle Group, eventually becoming overseas operations director.
