= Otruba =

Otruba Отруба
- Khutor
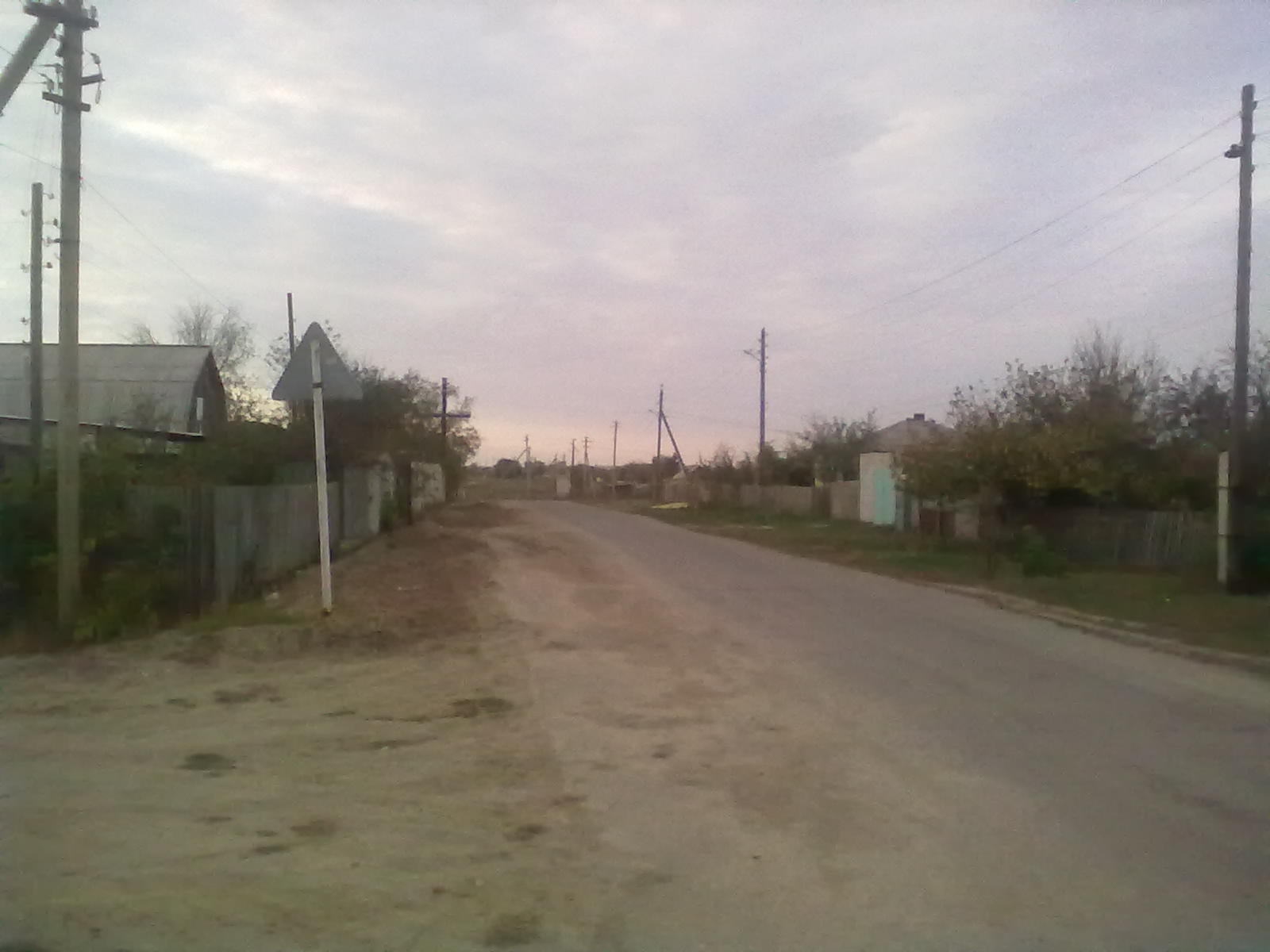

- Location within Volgograd Oblast Location within Russia
- Coordinates: 50°02′N 43°07′E
- Country: Russia
- Region: Volgograd Oblast
- District: Mikhaylovka Urban Okrug
- Time zone: UTC+4:00

Otruba (Russian: Отруба) is a rural locality (a khutor) in Mikhaylovka Urban Okrug, Volgograd Oblast, Russia. The population was 255 as of 2010. There are 9 streets.

== Geography ==
Otruba is located 16 km southwest of Mikhaylovka. Zapolosny is the nearest rural locality.
