= Ken Otremba =

American politician

Member of the Minnesota House of Representatives from the 11B district
- In office January 3, 1995 – September 4, 1997
- Preceded by: Rick Krueger
- Succeeded by: Mary Ellen Otremba

Personal details
- Born: October 29, 1948
- Died: September 4, 1997 (aged 48) Long Prairie, Minnesota
- Party: Minnesota Democratic-Farmer-Labor Party
- Spouse: Mary Ellen Otremba (deceased)
- Children: Andrew Otremba, Timothy Otremba, Kateri Torborg, Elizabeth Berg
- Profession: Farmer, United States Navy

Ken Otremba (October 29, 1948 – September 4, 1997) was an American politician and a member of the Minnesota House of Representatives representing District 11B, which includes portions of Douglas and Todd counties in the west central part of the state. A Democrat, Otremba was elected to two terms in office, dying of liver cancer during the second.

Otremba served as a fire control technician in the United States Navy during the Vietnam War, and later served in government, serving as an officer for the township of Reynolds, and as a commissioner for Todd County.

Otremba, a farmer, was married to Mary Ellen Otremba, who succeeded him in office. The two had four children. His cousin was Steve Dehler who also served in the Minnesota Legislature.

Political offices
Preceded by Rick Krueger	Minnesota State Representative from the 11B District; 1995-1997	Succeeded by Mary Ellen Otremba
