= Duigan pusher biplane =

1910 experimental aircraft by Australian inventor John Duigan

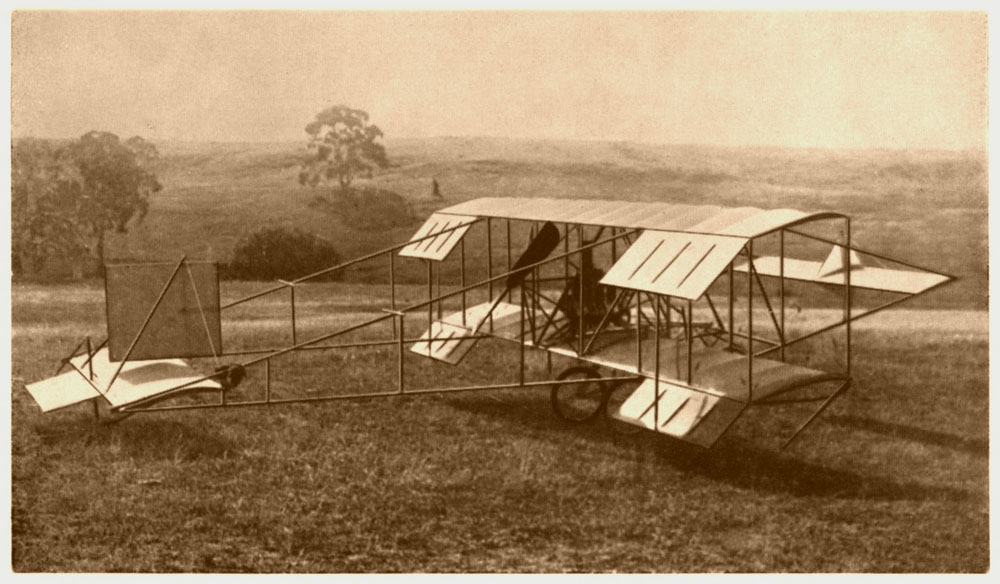

General information
- Type: Experimental aircraft
- Manufacturer: John Duigan
- Designer: John Duigan
- Number built: 1

History
- First flight: 16 July 1910

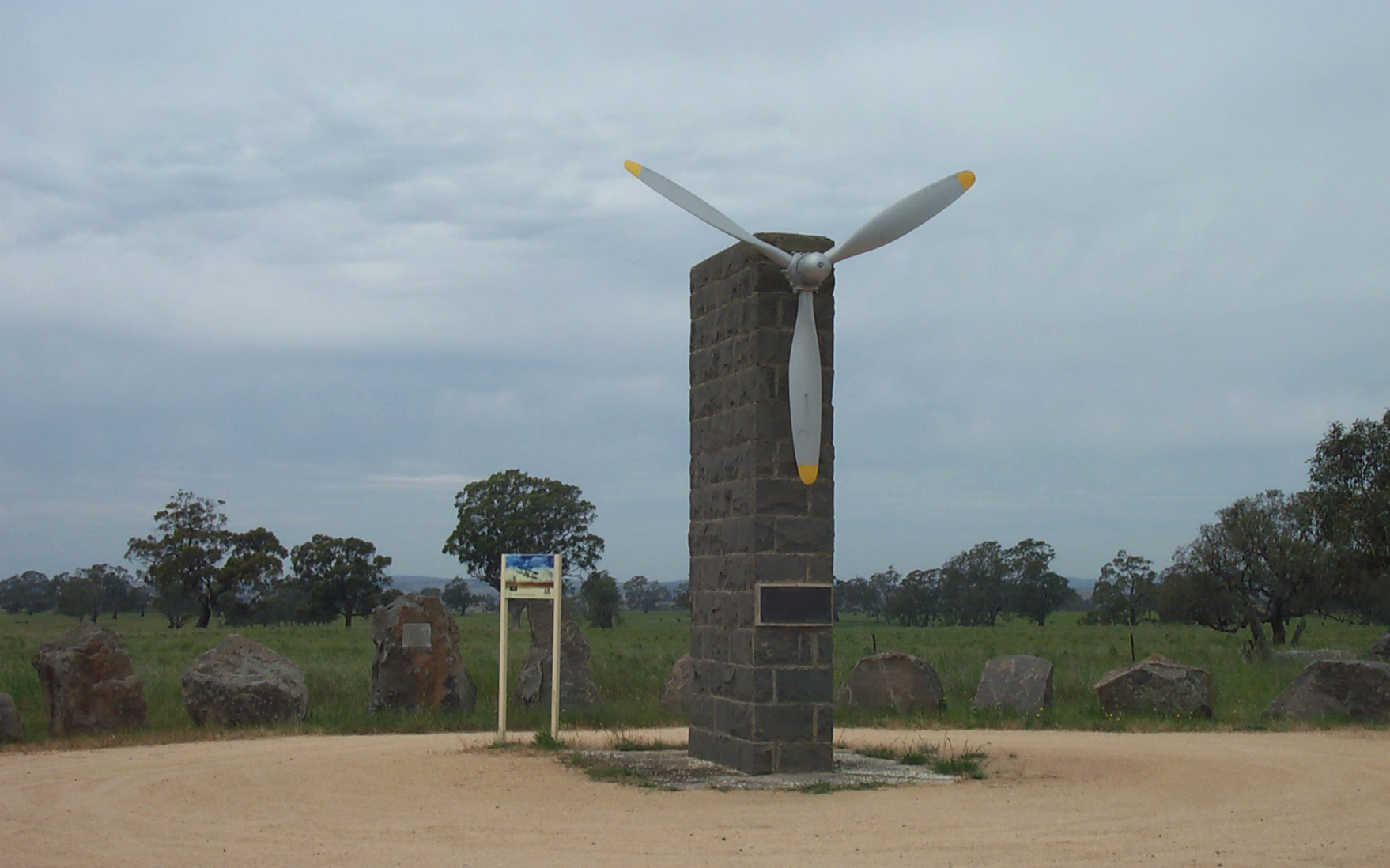
Memorial near Mia Mia, commemorating the first Australian-built aeroplane.

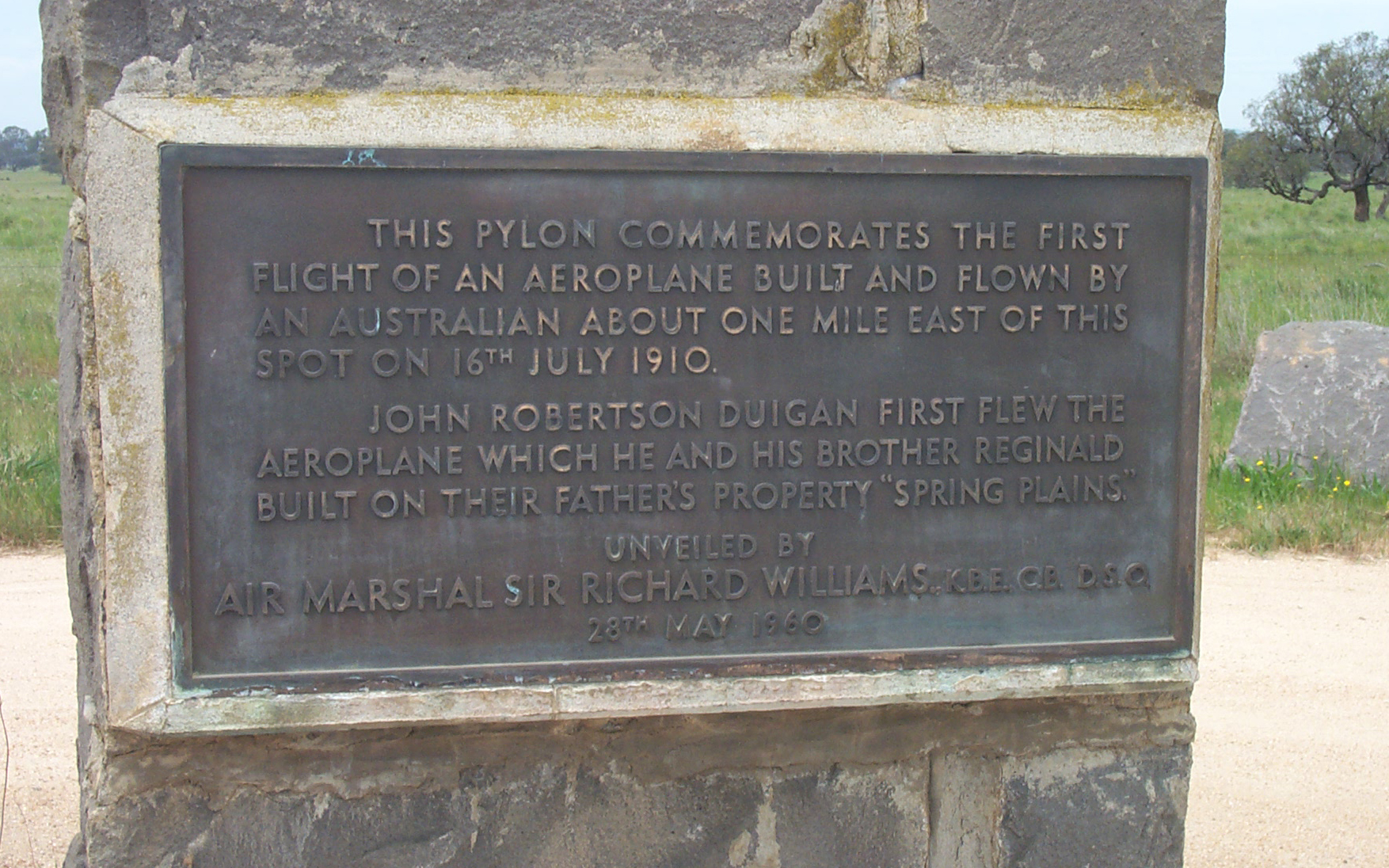
Plaque on memorial near Mia Mia, commemorating the first Australian-built aeroplane.

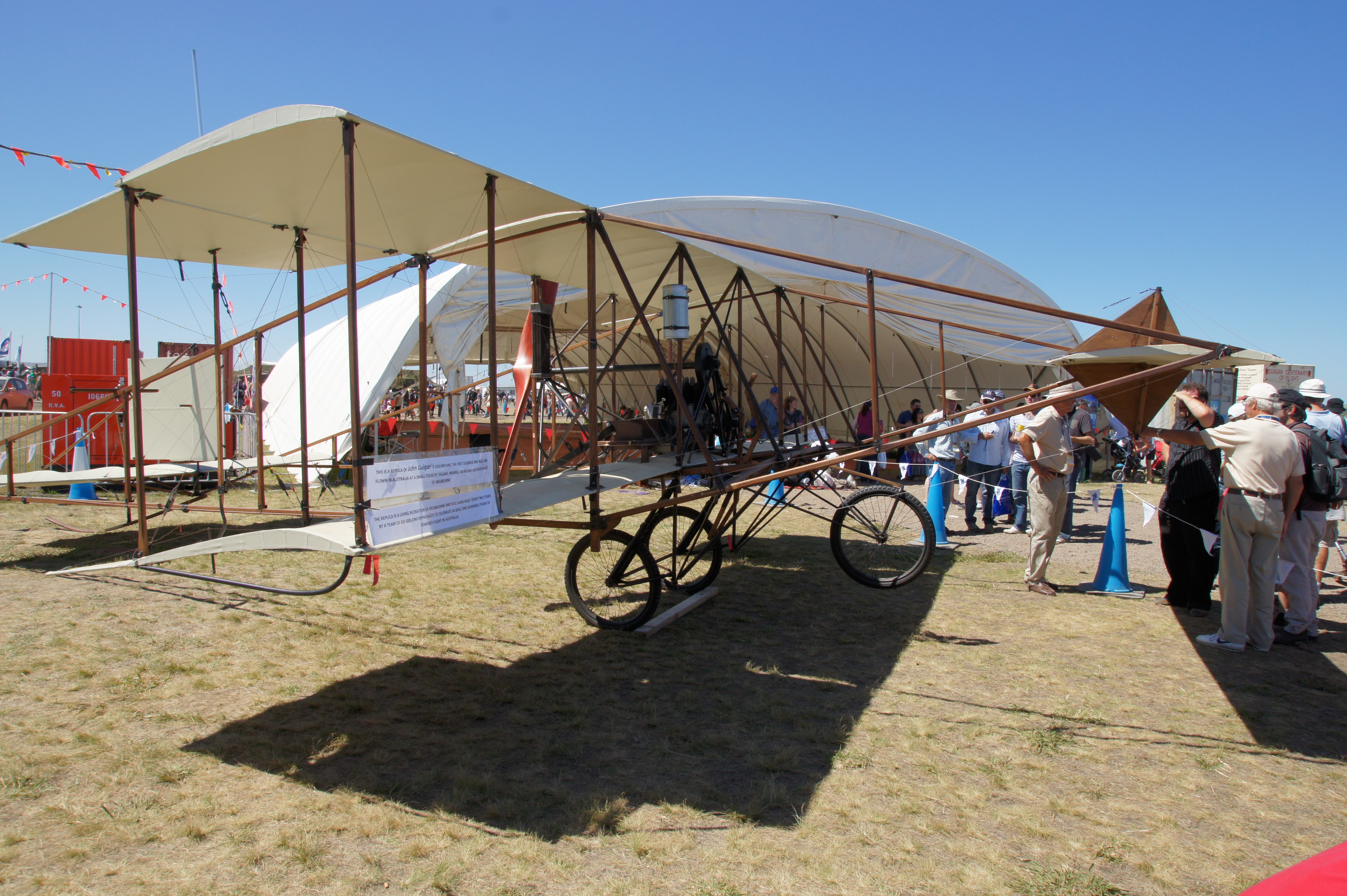
A replica of Duigan pusher biplane in Australian Air Show 2011

The Duigan pusher biplane (often simply called the Duigan biplane) was an early aircraft which made the first powered flight by an Australian-designed and built machine when it flew in Victoria in 1910. The aircraft was constructed by John Duigan with help from his brother, Reginald, on their family farm at Mia Mia. The effort was especially significant in that the brothers built the aircraft almost entirely by themselves and without input from the pioneering aviation community; a photo-postcard of the Wright Flyer inspired the design and Sir Hiram Maxim's book Artificial and Natural Flight provided the theoretical basis.

The aircraft was an open-framework biplane with a three-bay, equal-span, unstaggered wing cellule, organised in a pusher configuration. Horizontal stabilisers were carried to both the front and rear, with a single rudder above the rear surface. A fixed tricycle undercarriage was fitted, and the pilot sat on the leading edge of the lower wing. Lateral control was by ailerons on both upper and lower wings, and an elevator was attached to the rear stabiliser. The only components not built by the Duigans themselves were the engine (made by the J. E. Tilley Engineering Company of Melbourne) and the propeller. However, both of these components were extensively modified by John before they could be used.

The aircraft flew for the first time on 16 July 1910, taking off under its own power and flying 7 metres (23 feet). Within two months, this had been extended to 90 metres (300 feet), and soon thereafter to 180 metres at an altitude of 3.5 metres (11 feet). By the end of the year, Duigan had made a flight of 1 km (5/8 mi) at an altitude of 30 metres (98 feet).

Duigan informed the Department of Defence of his achievements, hoping to claim a £5,000 prize that had been offered in September 1909 for the construction of an aircraft suitable for military purposes. Duigan was ineligible for the prize, which had expired at the end of March 1910, but was asked to demonstrate his aircraft for the military anyway. He also flew it in a public demonstration in front of a crowd of 1,000 spectators at Bendigo Racecourse in January 1911. In 1920, Duigan donated the aircraft to the Industrial and Technological Museum of Victoria, which was later absorbed into Museum Victoria.

Museum Victoria also preserves a flying replica of the Duigan biplane, built by Ronald Lewis and flown in 1990. It was donated to the museum in 2000.

== Specifications ==
General characteristics

- Crew: One pilot
- Length: 10.67 m (35 ft 0 in)
- Wingspan: 7.47 m (24 ft 6 in)
- Wing area: 19.5 m^{2} (210 sq ft)
- Gross weight: 285 kg (630 lb)
- Powerplant: 1 × custom-built water-cooled straight-4 , 19 kW (25 hp)

Performance

- Maximum speed: 64 km/h (40 mph, 35 kn)
