= Mary Ellen Otremba =

American politician

Member of the Minnesota House of Representatives from the 11B district
- In office November 13, 1997 – January 3, 2011
- Preceded by: Ken Otremba
- Succeeded by: Mary Franson

Personal details
- Born: September 26, 1950 Bertha, Minnesota, U.S.
- Died: July 16, 2014 (aged 63) Long Prairie, Minnesota, U.S.
- Party: Democratic
- Spouse: Ken Otremba (deceased)
- Children: 4
- Education: College of Saint Benedict; St. Cloud State University
- Profession: educator, farmer, legislator

Mary Ellen Dinkel Otremba (September 26, 1950 – July 16, 2014) was an American politician and a former member of the Minnesota House of Representatives who represented District 11B, which includes portions of Douglas and Todd counties in the west central part of the state. A Democrat, she was also a substitute teacher and farmer. On May 19, 2010, she announced that she would not seek an eighth term.

Otremba was first elected in a November 4, 1997, special election held after the death of her husband, Representative Ken Otremba, that September. She chaired the House Agriculture, Rural Economies and Veterans Affairs Committee, and was a member of the Ways and Means Committee. She also served on the Agriculture, Rural Economies and Veterans Affairs Subcommittee for the Veterans Affairs Division, and on the Finance subcommittees for the Agriculture, Rural Economies and Veterans Affairs Finance Division and the Health Care and Human Services Finance Division. She was an assistant minority leader from 2001 to 2004.

Otremba graduated from Long Prairie High School in Long Prairie, then went on to the College of Saint Benedict in St. Joseph, receiving a BA in Home and Community Service. She later attended St. Cloud State University in St. Cloud, earning her MA in Child and Family Studies. She worked as a nutritionist for the Todd County Department of Public Health from 1984 to 1989, as a teacher in the Freshwater Educational District from 1986 to 1989, and as a teacher at Eagle Valley High School in Eagle Bend from 1989 to 1997. Prior to and during her first term in the Legislature, she taught Family and Consumer Science at Swanville High School in Swanville and was a substitute teacher.

Otremba was a member of the Minnesota Agriculture Education Advisory Board and the Rural Health Advisory Board since 2002. She was also active in various organizations and clubs in her local community.

Otremba died on July 16, 2014, in Long Prairie, Minnesota.

Political offices
Preceded by Ken Otremba	Minnesota State Representative from the 11B District; 1997–2011	Succeeded by Mary Franson
