= John Robertson Duigan =

20th-century Australian aviation pioneer and inventor

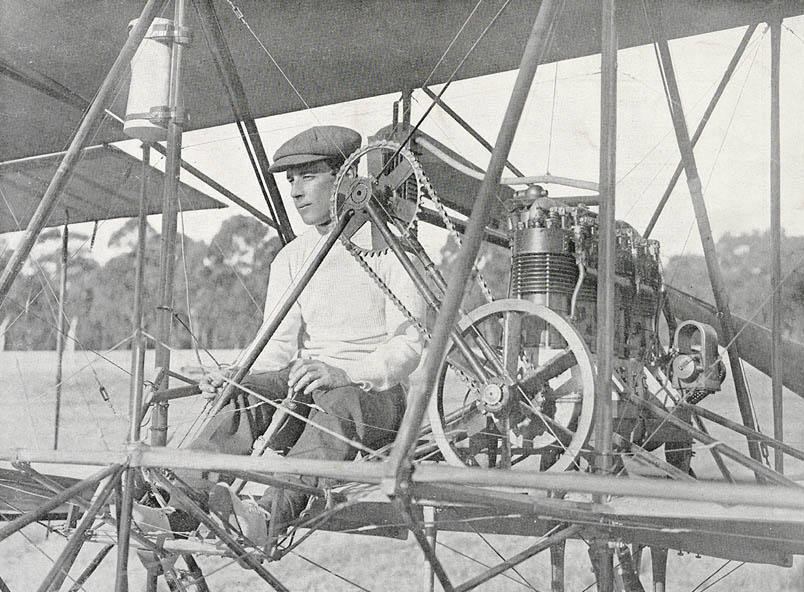
- Aviator John Robertson Duigan in his biplane, 1911
- Born: 31 May 1882; Terang, Victoria, Australia
- Died: 11 June 1951 (aged 69); Ringwood, Australia
- Occupations: aviator, inventor, mechanic
- Known for: Built and flew the first Australian-made aircraft

John Robertson Duigan MC (31 May 1882 – 11 June 1951) was an Australian pioneer aviator who built and flew the first Australian-made aircraft.

== Family ==
Duigan was born in Terang, Victoria, and grew up in Melbourne

He married nurse Kathleen Rebecca Corney at Caulfield on 26 November 1913.

== Education ==
He grew up in Melbourne, and was educated at Brighton Grammar School, he graduated in 1901.

== Aviator ==
He travelled to the United Kingdom in late 1901 to study electrical engineering at Finsbury Technical College in London (1902-1904) and Motor Engineering at Battersea Polytechnic (1905). He worked for the Wakefield & District Light Railway Co. until 1907 when he returned to Australia. From 1908 he lived at 'Spring Plains', a sheep station owned by his father near Mia Mia in central Victoria.

After seeing a postcard of Wilbur Wright's flights in France in late 1908 he began experimenting with aviation, first constructing a Wright-type glider, and then a powered aircraft. The 20-25 horsepower, four-cylinder engine was made in Melbourne by J.E. Tilley. This Farman-type biplane made a short flight on 16 July 1910, but Duigan never considered this to be a fully controlled flight. He regarded his longer flight of 7 October 1910 as his first successful attempt. This was followed by ever longer and higher flights. His younger brother, Reg Duigan, assisted with most aspects of the construction and testing of the biplane and later flew it about a dozen times. The biplane was flown in public at Bendigo Racecourse on 3 May 1911 where it completed its only circling flight as the paddock at Spring Plains was surrounded by hills and trees.

In June 1911 Duigan returned to the United Kingdom to gain his aviator's certificate (No. 211) at Brooklands in April 1912 using a tractor biplane built by A.V. Roe and purchased by Duigan in late 1911. He sold this machine before returning to Australia in late 1912. John and Reg then built a lighter version of the Avro design using the original ENV engine at their parents' house in Marshall Street Ivanhoe in Melbourne. This machine was badly damaged in a crash during its first flight at Keilor Plains in Victoria on 17 February 1913 that left Duigan badly bruised.

== Military service ==
Duigan enlisted in the Australian Flying Corps, and was commissioned lieutenant on 14 March 1916, and was appointed B Flight commander of No. 2 Squadron AFC (later renamed No. 3 Squadron AFC). In October, he embarked for England, and in August 1917 was promoted captain. He saw action in France with No. 3 Squadron AFC from December 1917 to May 1918. He received the Military Cross for gallantry after an air fight in which his RE.8 was set upon by four German Fokker Dr.1 Triplanes of Jasta 6 over Villers-Bretonneux on 9 May 1918. Despite being severely wounded, Duigan managed to land safely and saved the life of his observer Lieutenant Alec Paterson MM.

Demobilised in 1919, Duigan returned to Melbourne to resume his profession as an engineer. He established his own garage business 'Old Bridge Motors' at Yarrawonga in 1928, which he ran until returning to Melbourne in 1941, following a heart attack. He worked for the AID in Melbourne as an inspector of aircraft parts until the end of World War II.

At the end of the war, he retired to Ringwood, where he died of cancer on 11 June 1951.

== Memorial ==
A memorial was erected in 1960 near the site of his first flight fifty years previously. The original 1910 biplane has been held in the collection of Museum Victoria since 1920 when it was donated by John Duigan.

== Qantas Airbus 380 ==
Qantas named their Airbus A380 registration VH-OQK "John and Reginald Duigan" in recognition of his and his brother's contribution to the aviation industry.

== See also ==
- Harry Houdini: The Aviator — Houdini's flight at Diggers Rest, Friday, 18 March 1910.
