= John Lucas =

John Lucas may refer to:

== Politicians ==
- John Lucas (Australian politician) (1818–1902), Australian politician in New South Wales
- John Lucas (MP for Colchester) (by 1512–1556), MP for Colchester
- John Lucas (MP for Gloucester), Member of Parliament in 1311
- John Baptiste Charles Lucas (1758–1842), US congressman from Pennsylvania
- John G. Lucas (1864–1944), African-American lawyer and politician

== Sports ==
- John Lucas II (born 1953), American professional basketball player and head coach
- John Lucas III (born 1982), American professional basketball player and assistant coach
- John Lucas (cricketer) (1922–2008), West Indian and Canadian cricketer
- John Lucas (footballer) (1869–1953), Australian rules footballer for Geelong
- Jack Lucas (footballer) (John Lucas, born 1961), Australian rules footballer for Sydney
- Johnny Lucas (baseball) (1903–1970), American backup outfielder
- Johnny Lucas (canoeist) (1931–1993), Luxembourgish sprint canoer

== Military ==
- John Lucas (British Army officer) (1921–2013), British soldier with the Chindits
- John Lucas (VC) (1826–1892), Irish recipient of the Victoria Cross
- John P. Lucas (1890–1949), American general in World War II

== Others ==
- John Lucas, 1st Baron Lucas of Shenfield (1606–1671), English Royalist soldier, industrialist and landowner
- John Lucas (comics), American comic book artist
- John Lucas (educator) (1920–2025), American educator, president of Shaw University.
- John Lucas (historian) (1684–1750), historian of Warton, Lancashire, England
- John Lucas (painter) (1807–1874), English artist
- John Lucas (philosopher) (1929–2020), British philosopher
- John Lucas (poet) (1937–2025), British poet, critic and travel writer
- John Lucas (priest) (1921–1992), Archdeacon of Totnes
- John Meredyth Lucas (1919–2002), American screenwriter and director
- John Seymour Lucas (1849–1923), Victorian English historical and portrait painter

== See also ==
- Jon Lucas (born 1976), American screenwriter
- Jon Lucas (actor) (born 1995), Filipino actor
- St. John Lucas (1879–1934), English poet
- Jonathan Lucas, Canadian official of the United Nations
- John Lukacs (1924–2019), Hungarian-American historian
- John R. Lukacs (born 1947), American anthropologist
- Jon Lukas (1948–2021), Maltese musician
