= Michael Allmand =

English-French Second World War recipient of the Victoria Cross

Captain Michael Allmand VC
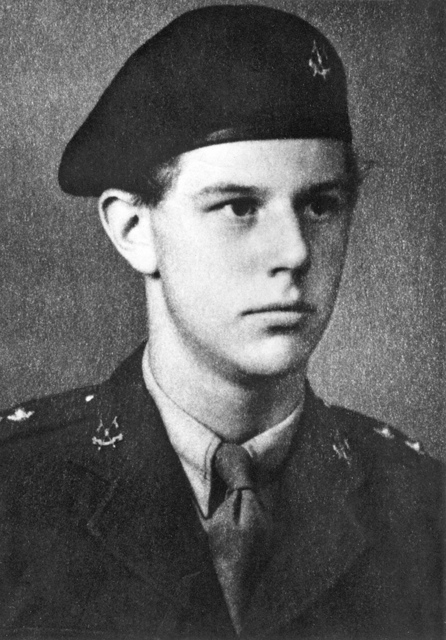
- Lieutenant (Acting Captain) Michael Allmand
- Born: 22 August 1923; Golders Green, London, England
- Died: 24 June 1944 (aged 20); Mogaung, British Burma
- Burial place: Taukkyan War Cemetery, Burma
- Military career
- Allegiance: United Kingdom
- Branch: Indian Army
- Service years: 1942–44
- Rank: Captain
- Units: Indian Armoured Corps; 6th Gurkha Rifles (attached)
- Conflicts: Second World War; Battle of Mogaung (DOW)
- Awards: Victoria Cross

Michael Allmand (22 August 1923 – 24 June 1944) was an English-French Second World War recipient of the Victoria Cross, the highest and most prestigious award for gallantry in the face of the enemy that can be awarded to British and Commonwealth forces.

Born into a Catholic family in London in 1923, Allmand attended Ampleforth College before studying history at Oxford University in 1941. He joined the British Indian Army in 1942 and was commissioned into the Indian Armoured Corps for service in the Far East.

He later volunteered to serve with the Chindits and in 1944 saw action against the Japanese during the Battle of Mogaung, during which he was killed in action at the age of 20.

== Early life ==
Michael Allmand was born in Golders Green, London, to Professor Arthur John MC and Marguerite Marie Allmand on 22 August 1923. Allmand's father, son of Frank (1858-1948) and Mary Allmand, née Thomas (1861-1918), was a professor of chemistry at King's College London and later dean of the faculty who came from a flour milling family in Wrexham, England (later Wales). The Allmands originated in the Malpas area of Cheshire. Allmand's mother Marguerite hailed from a family of Normans from the Saint-Lô district who were small landowners and professionals. Allmand grew up in a bilingual home, speaking both English and French.

Allmand had a brother, the medieval historian Christopher Allmand (1936–2022), and a sister Marguerite Allmand (1921–2009), later Marguerite Murphy, who was a member of the Auxiliary Territorial Service and worked as a code breaker at Bletchley Park during the Second World War. Allmand was raised in a Roman Catholic family, with his father being a convert to the faith and later a Knight of the Order of St. Gregory the Great, who were parishioners at St. Edward the Confessor Church Golders Green. Allmand himself had a deep and abiding religious faith.

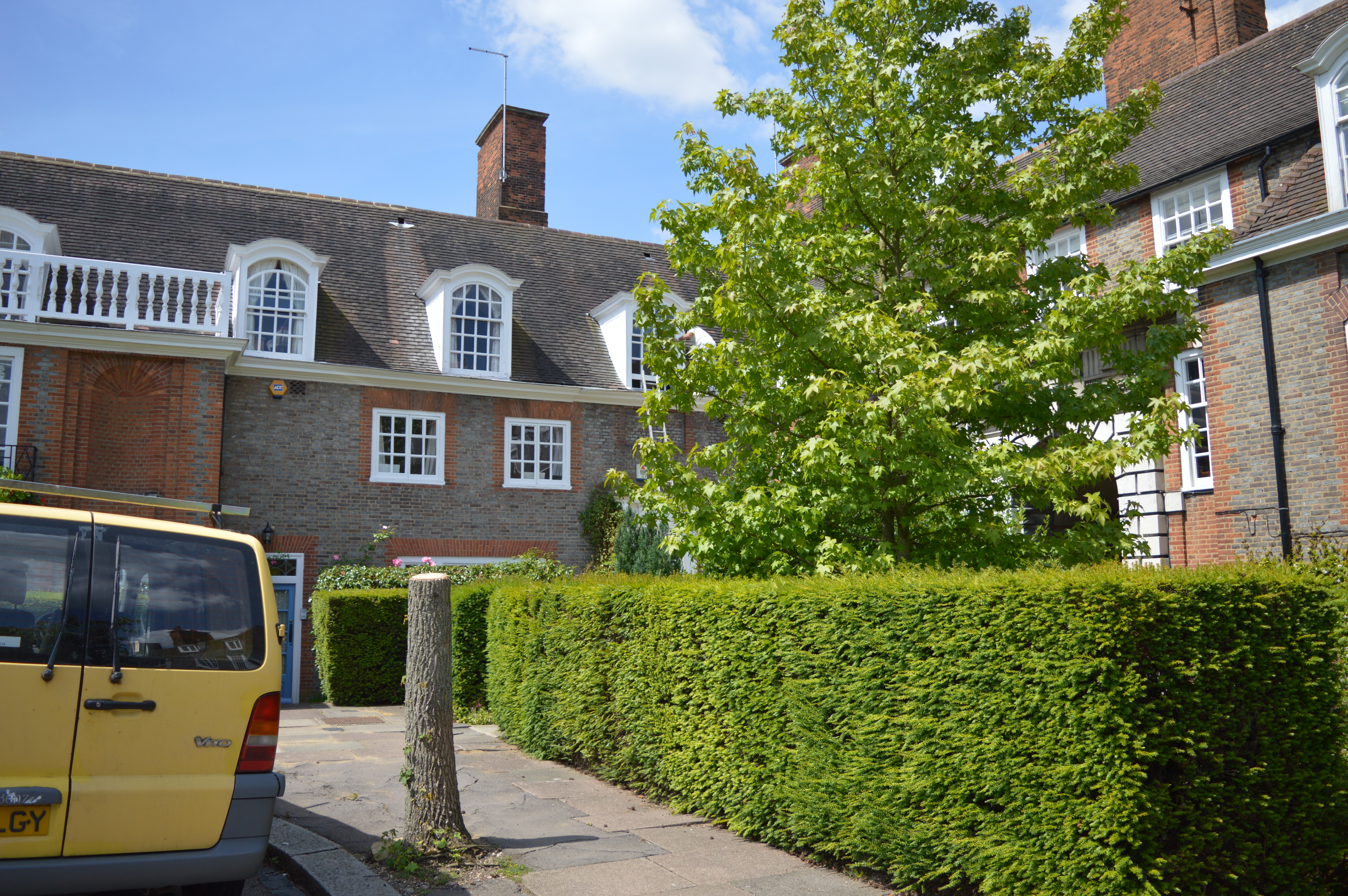
No 5 North Square, Allmands Childhood Home

Allmands childhood home was at No 5 North Square, Hampstead Garden Suburb.

Allmand was educated at Ampleforth College, in North Yorkshire, England, before attending Oriel College, Oxford in 1941 where he began to study history. While at Oxford, Allmand served as the founding editor of a literary review journal called The Wind and the Rain, and began writing a biography of Edmund Burke.

== Military career ==
At the end of 1942, amidst the backdrop of World War II, Allmand left university and joined the British Indian Army. He was commissioned into the Indian Armoured Corps, and assigned to the 6th Duke of Connaught's Own Lancers. Allmand was sent to India where, following a call from GHQ India, he volunteered for service with the Chindits during Operation Thursday and was subsequently attached to the 3rd Battalion, 6th Gurkha Rifles (3/6 GR).

For the operation, 3/6 GR were assigned to the 77th Brigade, under the command of Brigadier Mike Calvert, and divided into two columns. They were flown in by glider to landing zone BROADWAY in the northern Kaukwe valley on 5 March 1944. Despite heavy casualties and the destruction of a large number of gliders, a stronghold was established and from there columns were sent out to the north and south. The 3/6 GR were sent north towards Mawlu and Hopin where they probed Japanese defences. They were later sent north to another stronghold dubbed "Blackpool" where they were tasked with supporting Chinese forces around Mogaung and Myitkyina under US General Joseph Stilwell, who re-roled them as conventional infantry. Beginning on 6 June, the 77th Brigade advanced the final 10 miles (16 km) to Mogaung with the intent of capturing it. Between monsoonal rains and heavy casualties from the fighting as well as tropical diseases, the advance took a heavy toll on the Chindits. They were facing over 4,000 Japanese and by the end of the first week the brigade, having started with over 2,000 men, was down to just 550 and each battalion was at company strength.

Initially, Allmand was given command of a platoon. On 11 June, two days after 3/6 GR had reached the outskirts of the town, Allmand's platoon was tasked with capturing a road bridge about 0.25 miles (0.40 km) away from the central railway station, close to where the Japanese had established their headquarters in a building dubbed the "Red House". During the assault, his platoon took heavy fire and the attack stalled; leading from the front, Allmand went ahead, rallying his troops as he attacked the defenders with grenades and his kukri. Later he was promoted to acting captain and took over command of a company following the loss of its commander. He was again in the thick of the fighting on 13 June, when he led an assault to secure some high ground by singlehandedly destroying several machine-gun positions.

On 23 June, during the final stages of the advance on Mogaung, Allmand's company was tasked with capturing Natyigon village and securing the railway bridge that spanned the Mogaung River. Attacking to the left of the "Red House", Allmand's company was held up by machine-gun fire from an embankment near the bridge, Allmand went forward again. His movement was hampered by severe trench foot due to the poor conditions that the Chindits had faced. He nevertheless fought his way "through deep mud and shell-holes" and knocked out the machine-gun with grenades before being wounded. A short time later, another member of 3/6 GR, Tul Bahadur Pun, charged the bridge singlehandedly, killing the remaining Japanese defenders and securing it for the Gurkhas. Both Tul Bahadur and Allmand were later nominated for the Victoria Cross.

It was largely due to Allmand's bravery that Mogaung was captured. Although he was pulled out of the line of fire by another Gurkha – Sergeant Tilbir Gurung, who received the Military Medal for his act – Allmand subsequently died of his wounds early on 24 June. At the time he was just two months short of his twenty-first birthday. His Victoria Cross was awarded posthumously and was presented to his family by King George VI at Buckingham Palace on 17 July 1945, having been announced in the London Gazette on 26 October 1944. Allmand also received the following other decorations: the 1939–1945 Star, the Burma Star and the War Medal 1939–1945.

Allmand's body is interred at the Taukkyan War Cemetery, in Burma.

== Victoria Cross citation ==
The citation in the London Gazette which announced Allmand's award reads:

"Captain Allmand was commanding the leading platoon of a Company of the 6th Gurkha Rifles in Burma on 11th June, 1944, when the Battalion was ordered to attack the Pin Hmi Road Bridge. The enemy had already succeeded in holding up our advance at this point for twenty four hours. The approach to the Bridge was very narrow as the road was banked up and the low-lying land on either side was swampy and densely covered in jungle. The Japanese who were dug in along the banks of the road and in the jungle with machine guns and small arms, were putting up the most desperate resistance. As the platoon come within twenty yards of the Bridge, the enemy opened heavy and accurate fire, inflicting severe casualties and forcing the men to seek cover. Captain Allmand, however, with the utmost gallantry charged on by himself, hurling grenades into the enemy gun positions and killing three Japanese himself with his kukrie.

Inspired by the splendid example of their platoon commander the surviving men followed him and captured their objective. Two days later Captain Allmand, owing to casualties among the officers, took over command of the Company and, dashing thirty yards ahead of it through long grass and marshy ground, swept by machine gun fire, personally killed a number of enemy machine gunners and successfully led his men onto the ridge of high ground that they had been ordered to seize. Once again on June 23rd in the final attack on the Railway Bridge at Mogaung, Captain Allmand, although suffering from trench-foot, which made it difficult for him to walk, moved forward alone through deep mud and shell-holes and charged a Japanese machine gun nest single-handed, but he was mortally wounded and died shortly afterwards.

The superb gallantry, outstanding leadership and protracted heroism of this very brave officer were a wonderful example to the whole Battalion and in the highest traditions of his regiment."

== Legacy ==
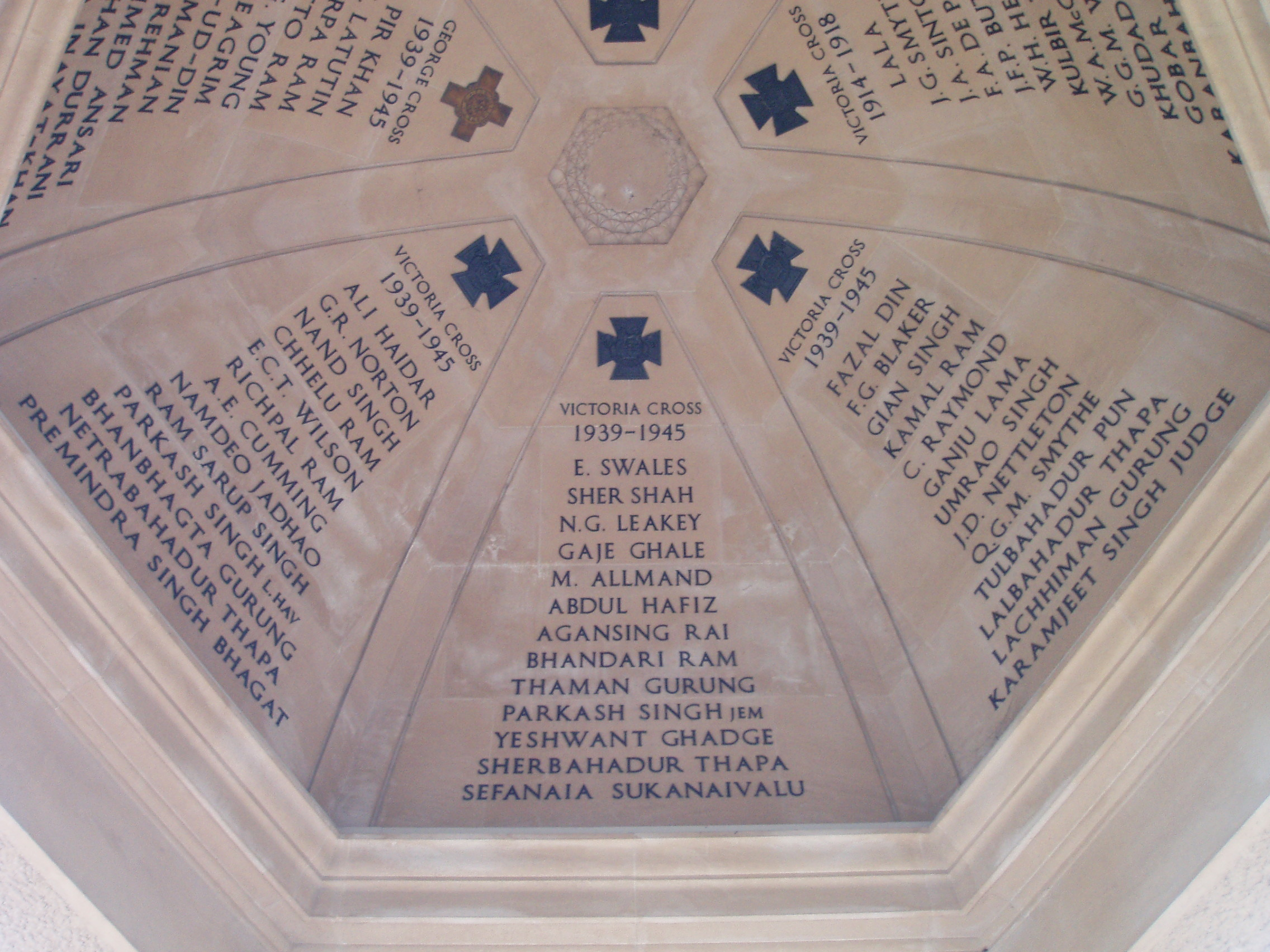
Allmands name listed on the memorial pavilion, on the Green Park side of Constitution Hill.

The Victoria Cross medal remained in Allmand's family's possession until 1991, when it was presented to the Regimental Trust in Hong Kong. Later, in 2003, the medal was donated to the Gurkha Museum at Winchester in Hampshire, England.

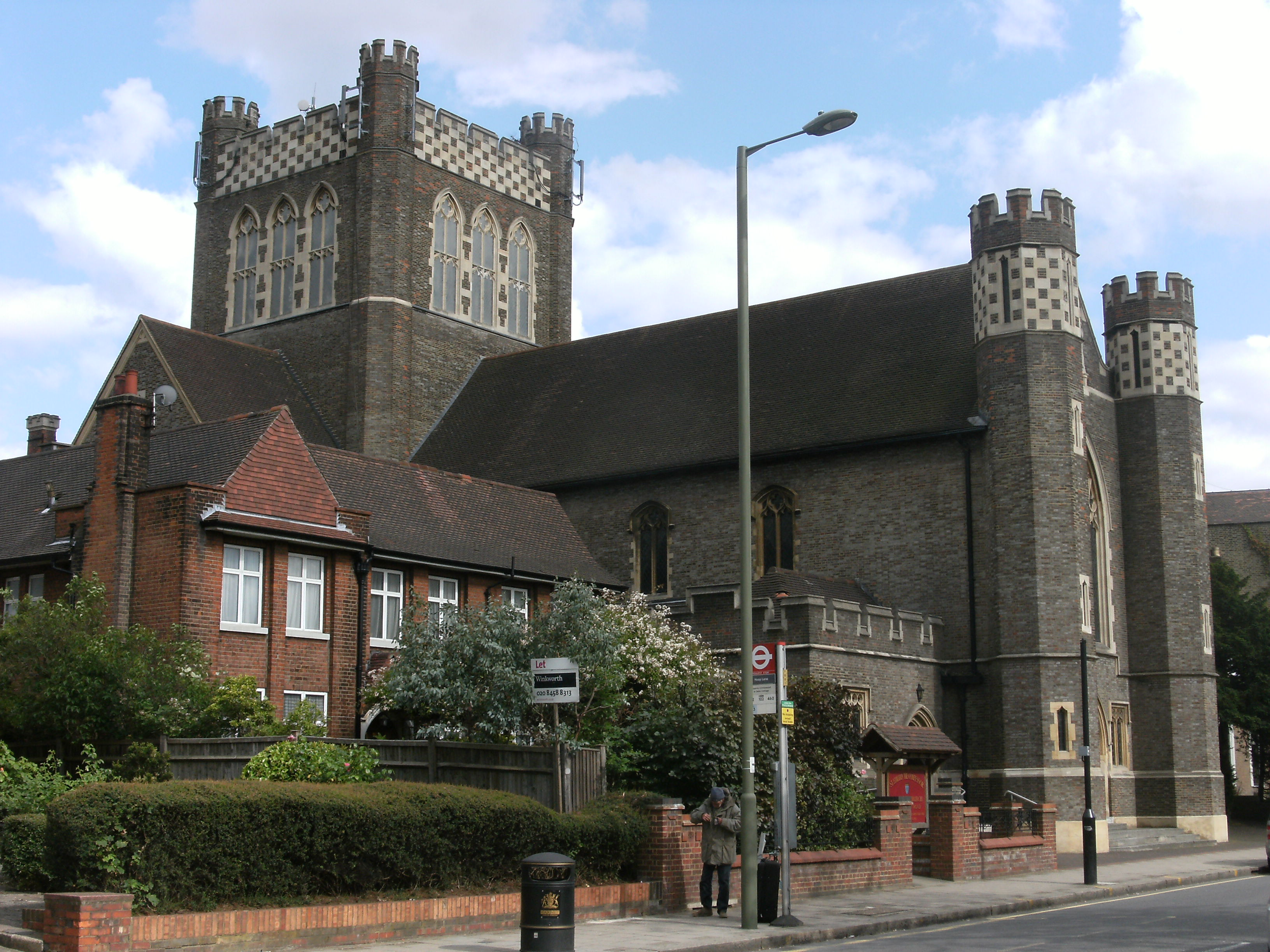
St Edward the Confessor Catholic Church in Golders Green where a memorial window over the high altar was erected in his memory.

Allmand's life is commemorated in the Memorial Window at the St Edward the Confessor Catholic Church in Golders Green, London.

Allmand is named on the Chindit Memorial, Memorial Gates and the Oriel College War memorial. He is also commemorated in John Bunting's Scotch Corners Chapel, a chapel on the edge of the North Yorkshire Moores dedicated to the War dead of Ampleforth College.

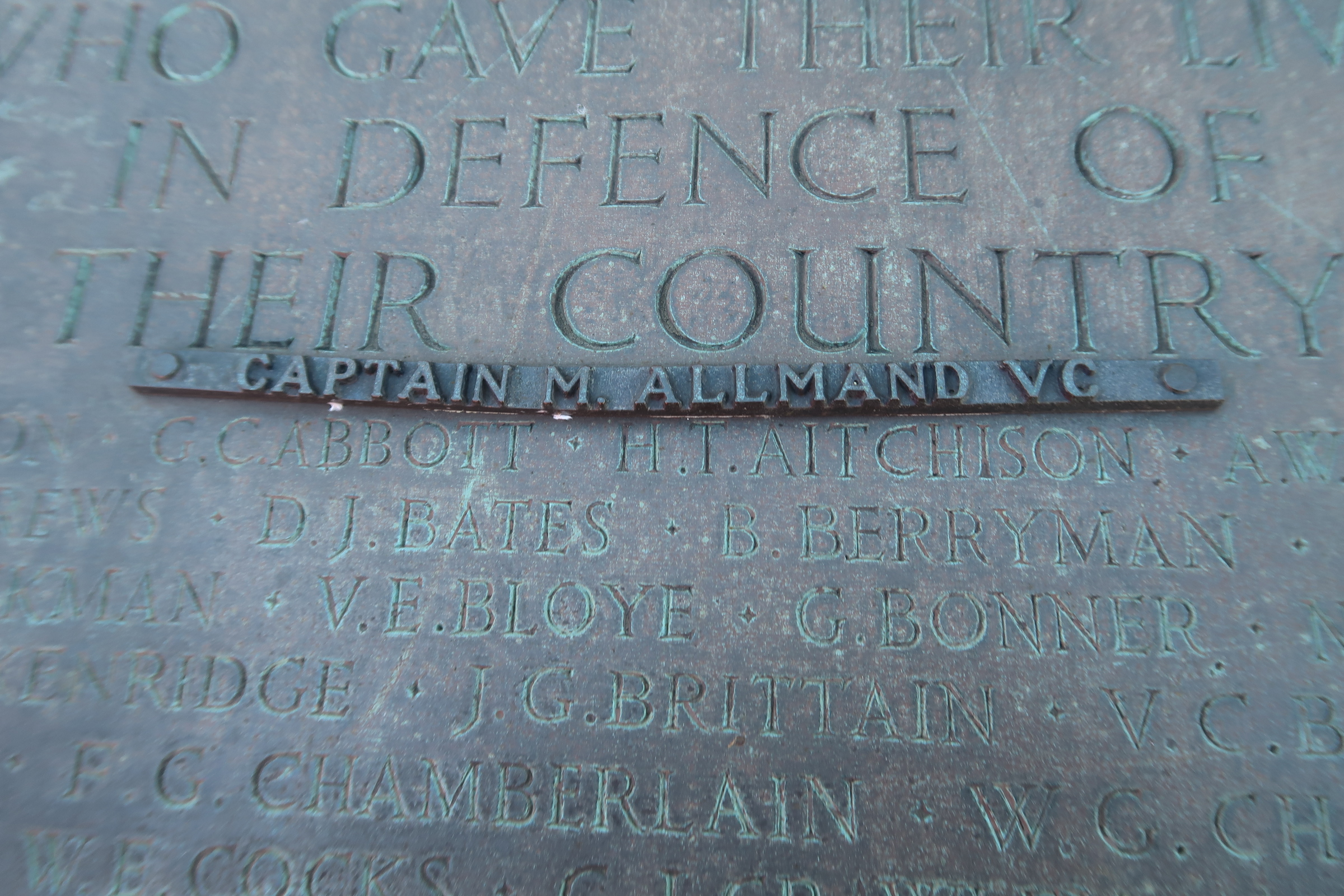
Captain M Allmand VC name tag, apparently added to the book of remembrance after it was installed on the Golders Green War Memorial.

The Michael Allmand Trophy is presented by the Combined Cadet Force contingent at Ampleforth College to the Cadet who scores the highest in their leadership competition. Allmand is also commemorated in the Library of Ampleforth where a painted portrait of him hangs. Allmand's name was added to the Golders Green War Memorial by fixing his name on to the bronze book that commemorates the World War II victims.

== See also ==
- List of Brigade of Gurkhas recipients of the Victoria Cross
- John Lucas (MC)
- Old Amplefordians
- Alumni of Oriel College

== Notes ==
- Brayley, Martin (2002). The British Army 1939–45 (3): The Far East. Men-at-Arms # 375. Botley, Oxford: Osprey Publishing. ISBN 1-84176-238-5.
- Bunting, Madeleine (2010). The Plot: A Biography of an English Acre. London: Granta Books. ISBN 978-1-84708-144-5.
- Parker, John (2005). The Gurkhas: The Inside Story of the World's Most Feared Soldiers. London: Headline Publishing. ISBN 978-0-7553-1415-7.
- Rooney, David (1992). Burma Victory: Imphal and Kohima March 1944 to May 1945. London: Cassell. ISBN 0-304-35457-0.
- The Wind and the Rain. 1. London: Phoenix Press. 1969. OCLC 300780348.
- Thompson, Peter (2008). Pacific Fury: How Australia and Her Allies Defeated the Japanese Scourge. North Sydney, New South Wales: William Heinemann. ISBN 978-1-74166-708-0.
