= Arthur John Allmand =

English chemist

- Born: 7 January 1885; Wrexham, Wales
- Died: 4 August 1951 (aged 66); London, England
- Education: University of Liverpool
- Spouse: Mile Marguerite Marie S. Malicorne
- Children: 3, including Christopher Allmand and Michael Allmand VC
- Awards: 1851 Research Fellowship; Fellow of the Royal Society; Fellow of the Royal Institute of Chemistry
- Scientific career
- Fields: Photochemistry; Electrochemistry
- Workplaces: University of Liverpool; King's College London

Arthur John Allmand MC
- Military career
- Allegiance: United Kingdom
- Branch: British Army
- Service years: 1915–1919
- Rank: Major
- Unit: 5th Battalion Cheshire Regiment
- Conflicts: World War I Battle of the Somme
- Awards: Military Cross

Major Arthur John Allmand KSG MC FRS FRIC (7 January 1885 – 4 August 1951) was an English chemist, professor of King's College London and Knight of the Roman Catholic Order of St. Gregory the Great.

== Early life ==
Born 1885 in Wrexham, Wales to Frank (1858–1948) and Mary Allmand, née Thomas (1861–1918) Frank Allmand, was the son of John and Elizabeth Allmand of Park Lodge, Rhosddu Road. The Allmands came from the Malpas area of Cheshire. Frank Allmand was a flour miller of Wrexham who originally owned a water mill, and later a steam mill. Frank Allmand's mill was later burnt down and this combined with the decline of smaller mills in the late 19th Century meant he subsequently became a corn and flour dealer. To supplement his income Frank Allmand bred large white pigs gaining championships at the ‘Bath and West’ and other prizes.The family were not well off, but at the 1891 census had two servants. Mary Allmand's father was a Timber Merchant. Allmand spent his early years at 23 Chester Street, Wrexham later the District Registry office.

== Education ==
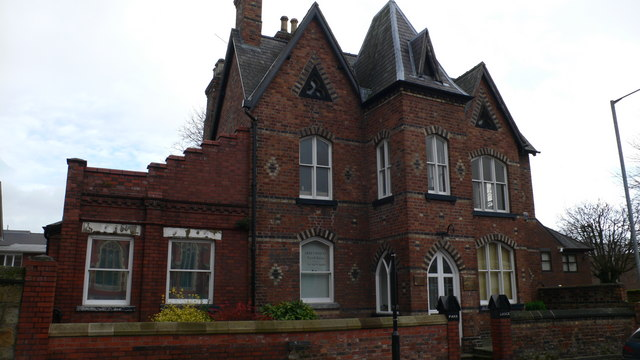
Park Lodge, Childhood home of Frank Allmand

Allmand's education first began in a Dame School in Wrexham until 1894 before proceeding to London to live with his Aunt in order to attend Alleyn's School, Dulwich on a Scholarship that waived his fees. On account of his aunt leaving London, he returned to Wrexam in 1898 where he attended Grove Park School. Allmand had decided to become a Chemist after being shown an article in The Scotsman by Professor Tapp of the University of Aberdeen. Despite the disapproval from his headmaster at Grove Park School for not pursuing a university education at Oxford Allmand passed the matriculation exam in 1901 in London, being placed 9th in honours. From there in 1902 Allmand attended University College Liverpool, Victoria University later University of Liverpool studying chemistry at first under James Campbell Brown with three Scholarships, the Gilchrist, the Tate Scholarship in technical science and one from the Denbighshire Education Committee. At Liverpool Allmand was a close contemporary of Francis Arthur Freeth and Warrington Yorke, with the trio always sitting side by side.

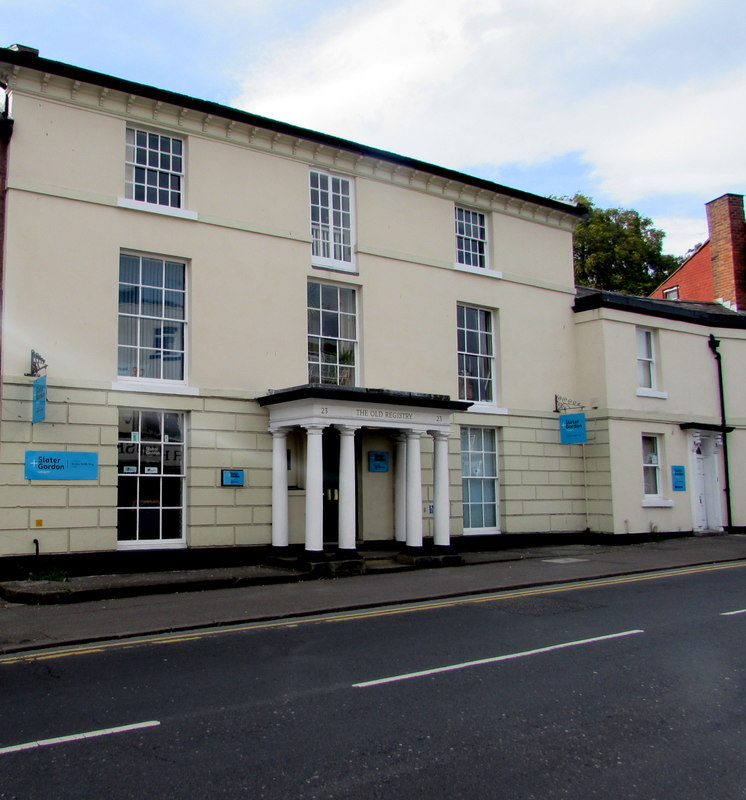
Allmands childhood home 23 Chester Street, later the Registry office.

Outside of Chemistry Allmand came under the influence of Bernard Pares, from whom he learnt Russian, the Celtic Scholar Kuno Myer, from whom he learnt some Celtic Philology and the linguist John Sampson. The Literary Scholar Oliver Elton was so impressed by his literary ability that he unsuccessfully asked him to join his staff.

Allmand graduated with a first-class honours degree in Chemistry in 1905.

== Early career ==
Allmands early career was spent at the University of Liverpool as a researcher under of Frederick Donnan where he assisted with design and equipment of the Muspratt Laboratory of Physical Chemistry. It was here Allmand developed a real interest in electrochemistry. Allmand then undertook an M.Sc degree in 1906, and a D.Sc in 1910.

It was in 1910 that Allmand was awarded an 1851 Research Fellowship awarded to "young scientists or engineers of exceptional promise" which took him to the University of Karlsruhe where Allmand worked under Fritz Haber between 1910 and 1911 and subsequently to Royal Saxon Polytechnic Institute, Dresden under Robert Luther between 1911 and 1912. Between 1912 and 1913 Allmand became Donnan’s research assistant in Liverpool and accompanied him to London when Donnan succeeded Sir William Ramsay as the Chair of Chemistry at University College, London.

In 1913 Allmand returned to the University of Liverpool where Allmand was assistant lecturer and demonstrator, holding this position till 1919.

== Military career ==
Allmand was in Germany at the start of World War I in 1914, and had to escape the country via Poland, Russia and Sweden.

It was after this that Allmand decided to pursue a commission in the British Army.

In October 1914 Allmand sent a telegram to his university contemporary Frederick Freeth, who was serving in the 5th Battalion the 22nd (Cheshire) Regiment, T.A:

‘Can you assist me to obtain a commission in the Cheshire Regiment’.

To which the reply came:

‘Yes, if you will shave off your beard’.

He was commissioned into the Cheshire Regiment in January 1915 and in the spring of 1915 he joined the 5th Battalion near Ypres; they subsequently went to the Somme. After the introduction of chemical warfare during the war Allmand, as an officer with a chemical background, was seconded from Regimental duty to Gas Services Royal Engineers as Assistant Chemical Adviser to the Third Army on 30 August 1915. In 1916 year he was made a Chemical Adviser to the Fourth Army and in 1918 he was chemical advisor with the Second Army, was in the Army of Occupation and in 1919 was demobilised with the rank of Major.

Allmand was awarded a Military Cross on 3 June 1916.

== Later career ==
After leaving the University of Liverpool Allmand's next role was as Professor of Chemistry at King's College, London starting in 1919 until 1950, when he retired. During this time he also served as Dean of the faculty, and was also titled as "Senior Professor".

It was around this time that Allmand developed a growing interest in photochemistry and by 1924 had several researches in both photochemistry and electrochemistry. Through photochemistry he pursued kinetic theory and reaction kinetics that according to Frederick Freeth in his obituary "added greatly to the breadth of Allmand’s learning and the interest of his school."

Allmand was a Vice-President of the Chemical Society and President of the Faraday Society, between the years of 1947 and 1948. Allmand was an Honorary Fellow of the Polish Chemical Society. He was elected as a fellow into the Royal Society in 1929 and was a Fellow of the Royal Institute of Chemistry, a fellow of the Electroplaters Technical Society and for many years was a member of the American Chemical Society and the Deutsche Bunsen Gesellschaft.

== Catholic faith ==
A landmark and reported turning point in his life was his conversion to his wife's faith, the Roman Catholic Church. Allmand was reported to be naturally a religious man, and held a devotion to the Catholic Church all his life.

In his obituary it was written by Francis Arthur Freeth that:

Allmand’s main working life was dominated by his intense religious conviction that his duty was to serve his country, his university and his students to the greater glory of God.

Allmand's devotion and piousness to the Catholic Church is the indicated by the fact that Pope Pius VII made him a Knight of the Order of Saint Gregory in 1950.

== Marriage and personal life ==
Allmand married Marguerite Marie Suzannie Malicorne (25 February 1896 - April 1957) 17 July 1920 in Saint-Mandé. Malicornes parents were Normans from the Saint-Lô district; small landowners and professionals. There were three children of the marriage:

- Marguerite Allmand (5 August 1921- 26 October 2009) who studied languages at the University of London and during the Second World War served in the Auxiliary Territorial Service and worked as a code breaker at Bletchley Park. She married a Civil Servant named John William Murphy in April 1948 and had 4 children.
- Captain Michael Allmand VC (22 August 1923 – 24 June 1944) who was educated at Ampleforth College followed by Oriel College, Oxford where he studied history. Michael was commissioned into the Royal Armoured Corps in 1943 and joined the 6th Duke of Connaught’s Own Lancers, where he volunteered to serve in the Second Chindits Expedition and was posted to the 3rd Battalion, 6th Gurkha Rifles, in the 77 Infantry Brigade. He was awarded the Victoria Cross, the highest award for valour for two separate incidents on 11 June and 23 June 1944, the latter incident is where he was mortally wounded. Upon announcement of the award the family residence at Hampstead was swarmed with reporters. The VC was presented to his family by King George VI at Buckingham Palace on 17 July 1945.
- Christopher Allmand (18 April 1936 – 16 November 2022) who was educated at Ampleforth College followed by Oriel College, Oxford where he studied history. Christopher Allmand pursued an academic career and in the Late Middle Ages in England and France. His particular research and teaching interests lay in the Hundred Years' War. He spent most of his teaching career at the University of Liverpool, becoming Professor of Medieval History, until his retirement in 1998. He married Bernadette Heath in 1964 and had 4 daughters.

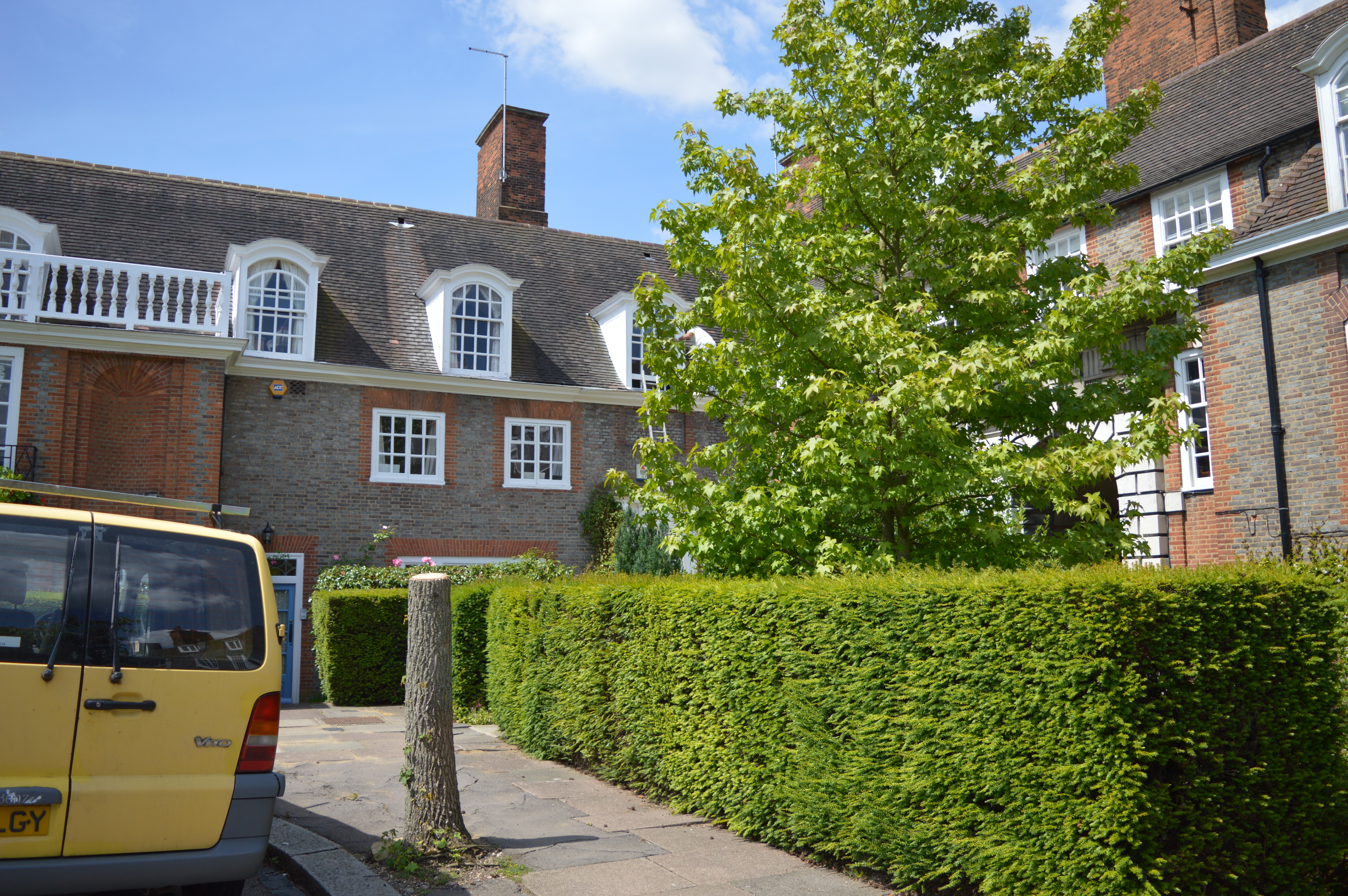
The Allmands family home No 5 North Square, Hampstead Garden Suburb

Allmand had some knowledge of the Welsh language, but was not fluent. The Allmand household was a bilingual one, where both French and English were spoken on account of Allmand's French wife. Allmand was said to be often dressed in a blue suit, flannel shirt and regimental tie and was said to be committed to his duty with an enthusiasm for army life and training.

The Allmand family home was No 5 North Square, Hampstead Garden Suburb.

== Death ==
Major Arthur John Allmand died on 4 August 1951 after a botched operation. Allmand's funeral was held at St Edward the Confessor Church, Golders Green.

In Sir Ernest Barker's biography Age and Youth: Memories of Three Universities and Father of the Man, Baker writes of King’s College, London, and says:

‘in chemistry there was that rare spirit, saint as well as chemist whose memory is a benediction, A. J. Allmand’.
