= Chindit Memorial =

War memorial in London

Coordinates: 51.5033°N 0.1240°W

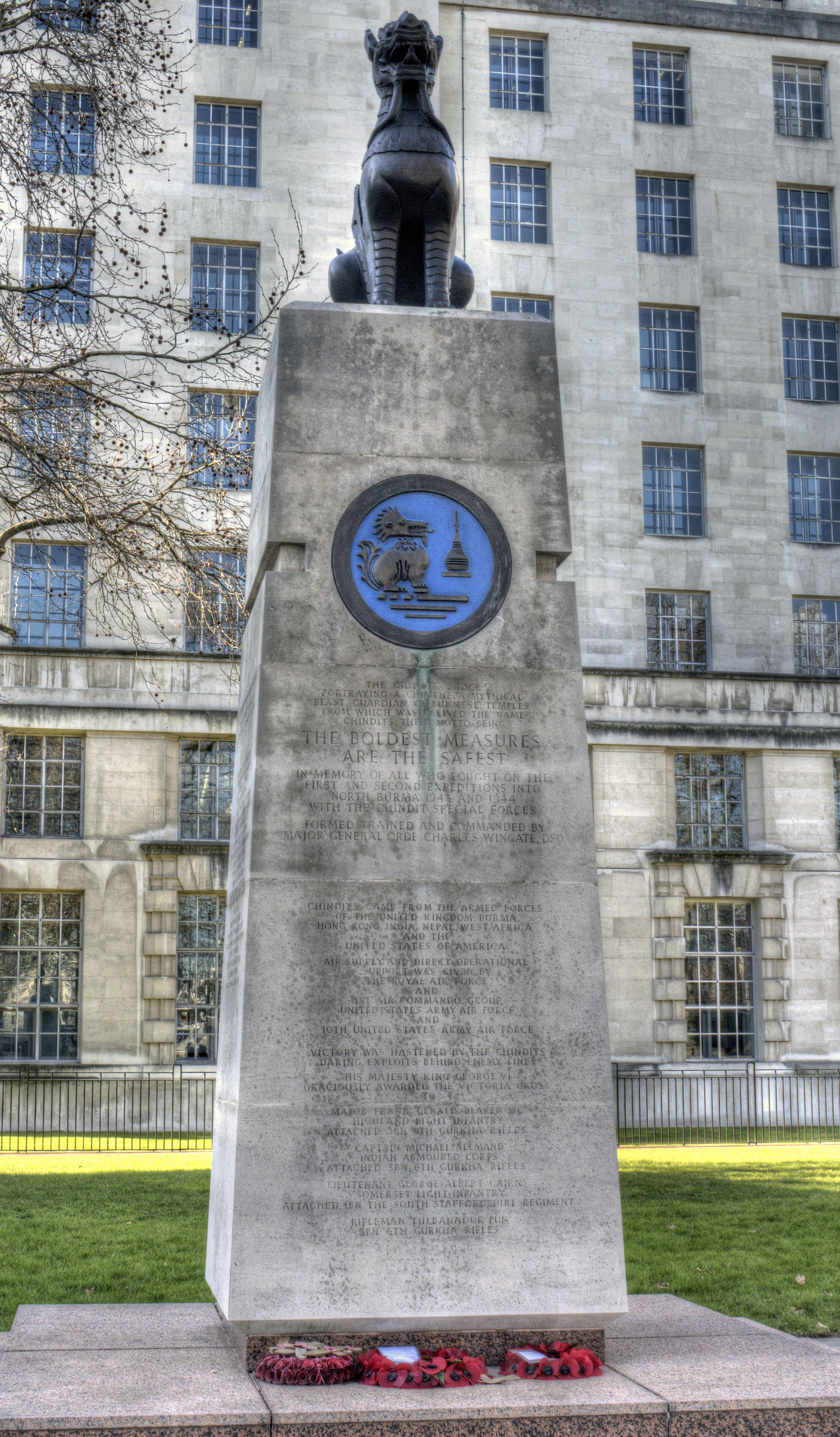
The Chindit Memorial in 2015

The Chindit Memorial is a war memorial in London, England, that commemorates the Chindit special forces, which served in Burma under Major General Orde Wingate in the Second World War. The memorial was erected in Victoria Embankment Gardens in 1990, near the Ministry of Defence headquarters, and also commemorates Wingate, who died on active service in Burma in 1944. It became a Grade II listed building in August 2020.

The Chindits – officially designated the 77th Indian Infantry Brigade in 1943, and the 3rd Indian Infantry Division in 1944 – were organised by Wingate to serve behind Japanese lines in the Burma Campaign, in 1943 and 1944. They are named after the mythical chinthe, a guardian of Burmese temples, which appears on the badge of the forces. A sculpture of the chinthe, by Frank Forster, tops the memorial, above a tapering 4 metres (13 ft) high Portland stone pillar mounted on three steps of red granite.

The memorial was designed by architect David Price. The front of the monument has an inscription to the memory of the Chindits, and also has a plaque depicting of the Chindit badge on a blue background and the Chindit motto, "The boldest measures are the safest". The inscription also lists the four men of the Chindits who were awarded the Victoria Cross: Major Frank Blaker, Captain Michael Allmand, Lieutenant George Albert Cairns and Rifleman Tulbahadur Pun.

The units involved are listed on the sides of the monument, and the rear of the monument is dedicated to Wingate, with a blue plaque depicting a portrait of Wingate, a quotation from Winston Churchill: "A man of genius who might well have become a man of destiny", and a reference to Wingate's influence in the foundation of the state of Israel and the formation of the Israel Defence Forces, arising from his service in the British Mandate of Palestine in the 1930s.

The memorial was unveiled on 16 October 1990 by Prince Philip, Duke of Edinburgh. There is a separate further memorial to the Chindits in the National Memorial Arboretum, and a memorial at Hurlburt Field in Florida commemorates the cooperation between the Chindits and the US 1st Air Commando Group.

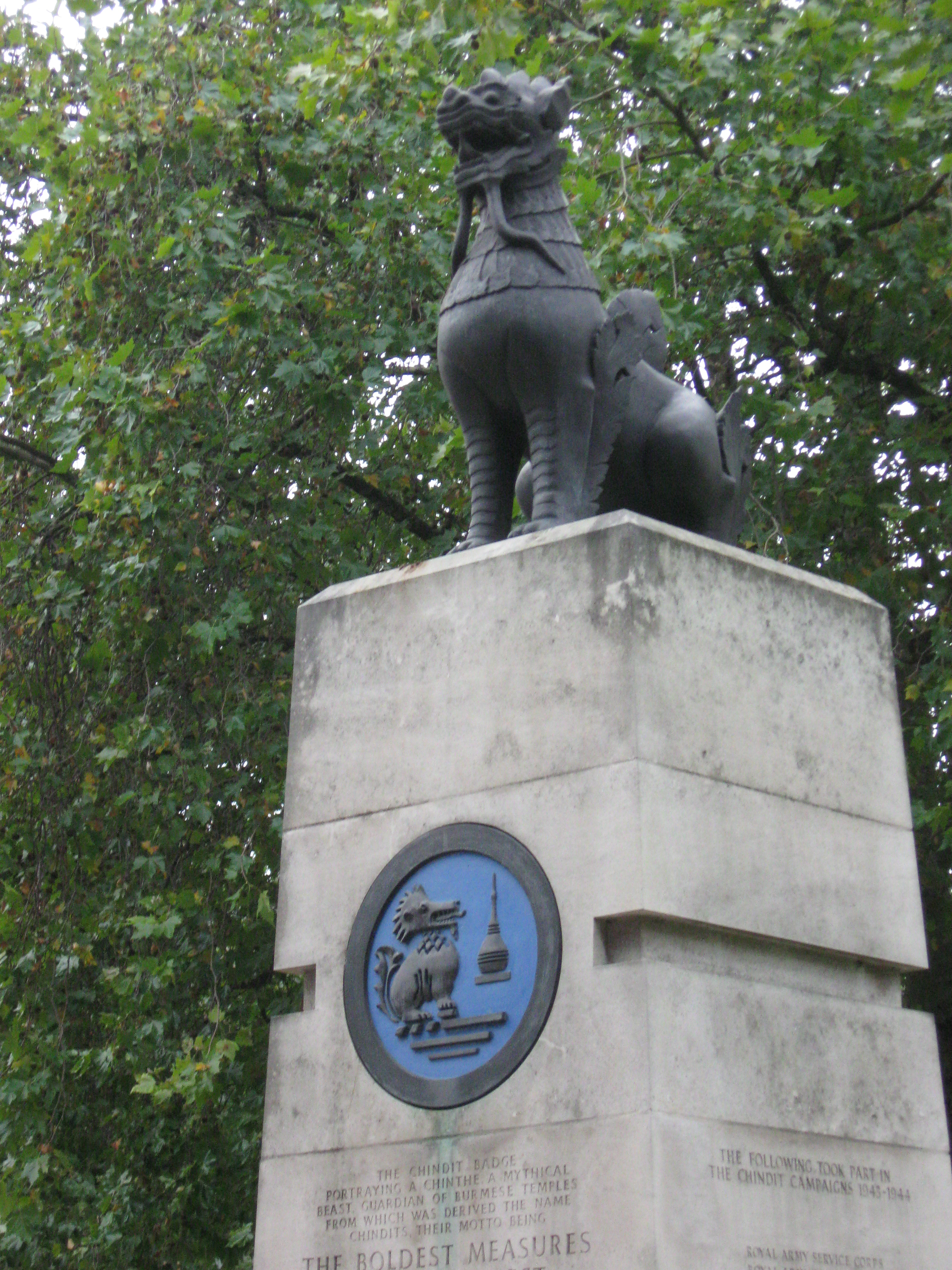
Detail

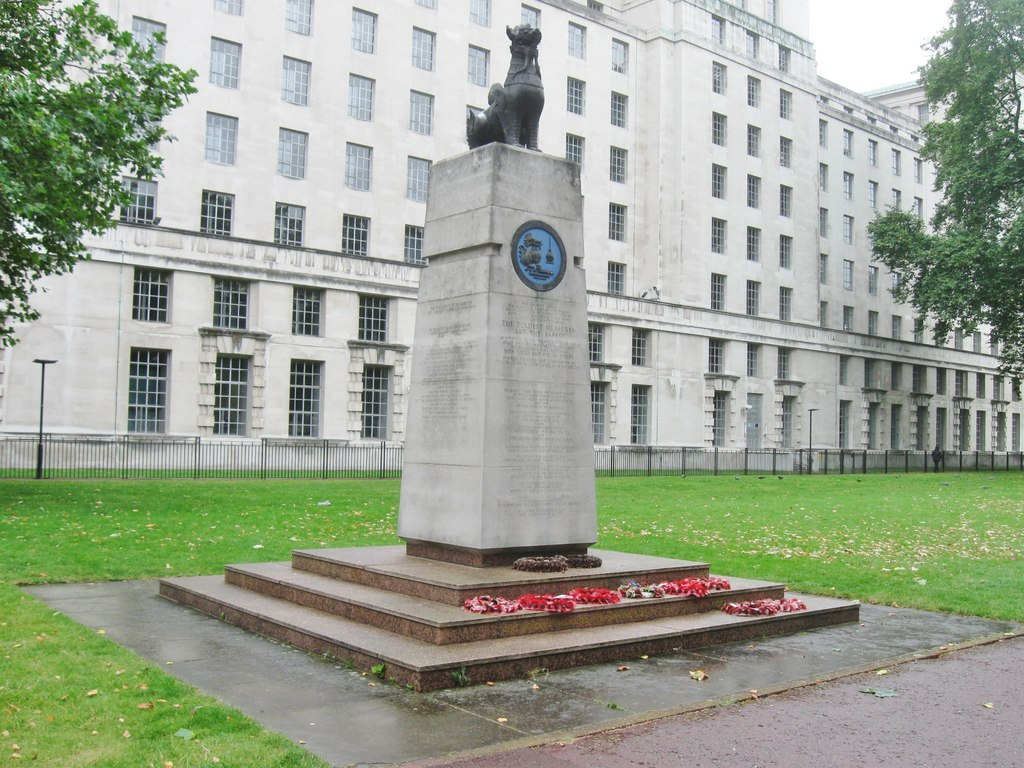
Setting beside the Ministry of Defence headquarters

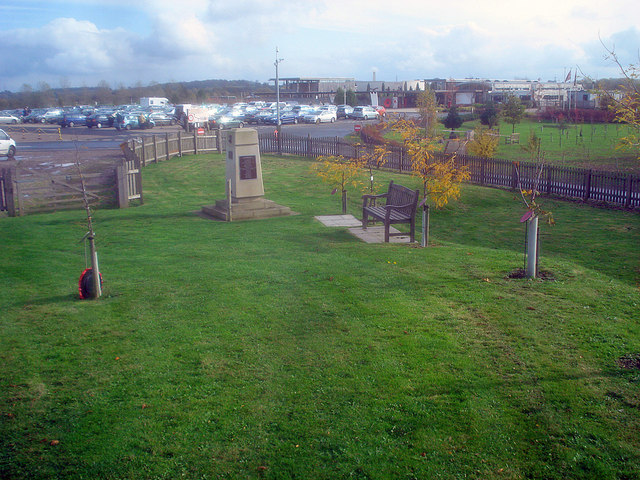
Chindit Memorial at the National Memorial Arboretum

In August 2020, to commemorate the 75th anniversary of VJ Day and shortly before the 30th anniversary of its unveiling, the Chindit Memorial became a Grade II listed building.
