= Christopher Allmand =

English-French medieval historian (1936–2022)

Christopher Thomas Allmand FSA (18 April 1936 – 16 November 2022) was an English-French historian, who specialised in the Late Middle Ages in England and France. His particular research and teaching interests lay in the Hundred Years' War. He spent most of his teaching career at the University of Liverpool, becoming Professor of Medieval History, until his retirement in 1998. Among many publications, he produced a much-used monograph on the Hundred Years' War and the leading biography of King Henry V.

== Family and early life ==
Allmand was born to Professor Arthur John MC and Marguerite Marie Allmand on 22 August 1923. Allmand's father, son of Frank (1858 - 1948) and Mary Allmand, née Thomas (1861 - 1918), was a professor of chemistry at King's College London and later dean of the faculty who came from a flour milling family in Wrexham, England (later Wales). The Allmands originated in the Malpas area of Cheshire. Allmand's mother, Marguerite, was French. She hailed from a family of Normans from the Saint-Lô district who were small landowners and professionals.

Allmand grew up in a bilingual home, speaking both English and French.

He had a sister Marguerite Allmand (1921 – 2009), later Marguerite Murphy, who was a member of the Auxiliary Territorial Service and worked as a code breaker at Bletchley Park during the Second World War. Allmand was raised in a Roman Catholic family, with his father being a convert to the faith and later a Knight of the Order of St. Gregory the Great, who were parishioners at St. Edward the Confessor Church Golders Green.

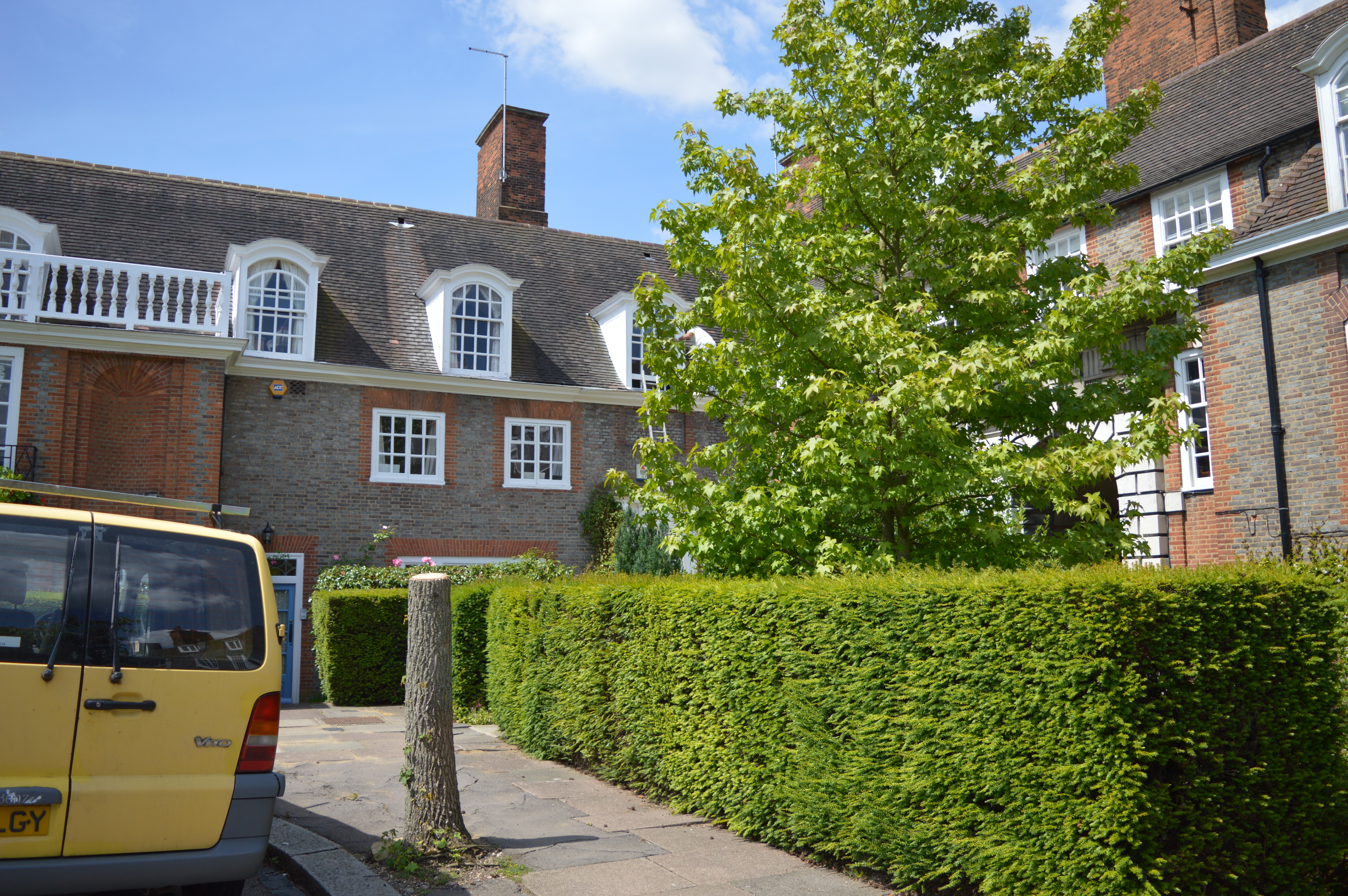
No 5 North Square, Allmands Childhood Home

Allmands childhood home was at No 5 North Square, Hampstead Garden Suburb, in London.

He was educated at Ampleforth College, following in the footsteps of his brother Michael (1923 - 1944) who died fighting against the Japanese at the Battle of Mogaung.

He attended Oriel College, Oxford and completed his PhD on the church in Normandy in the fifteenth century, supervised by E.F.Jacob.

== Career ==
Allmand taught at the University of Bangor in Wales, before moving to take up a lectureship at the University of Liverpool, where he remained for the rest of his academic career. He became a Senior Lecturer, Reader and finally Professor of History until his retirement in 1998. During this time he also served as Head of Department.

Allmand played a major role in supporting history at a national level, serving as Associate Literary Director (1974–77) and then Literary Director (1977–82) of the Royal Historical Society, of which he also became a Council Member (1985–89).

Allmand was elected a Fellow of the Royal Historical Society in 1965 and a Fellow of the Society of Antiquaries in 1976.

After retirement he conducted an exhaustive survey of every known manuscript of the influential Roman work of military history by Vegetius, the De Rei Militari. This involved visiting libraries and archive collections across Europe.

== Personal life and death ==
Allmand's father was A.J. Allmand, who held a Chair in Chemistry at King's College, London until 1950, having early in his career during World War I carried out important work on the use of gas. He and his French wife had three children. Michael Allmand (1923–1944), Christopher's much older brother, attended Ampleforth College and read history at Oxford. He joined the British Indian Army in 1942 and was attached to the 6th Gurkha Rifles. He was killed at the age of 20 leading an assault on heavily defended positions, and was posthumously awarded a Victoria Cross. Allmand and his sister were able to present this medal to the Gurkha Regiment in 1991 and it is now held in the Gurkha Museum in Winchester. His sister Marguerite read Modern Languages at the University of London and went on to work at Bletchley Park during the Second World War.

Allmand was devoted to his wife, Bernadette, who predeceased him by nine months. As a lifelong Catholic, he attended and served Bishop Eton Church in Woolton, Liverpool, acting as sacristan in later years. He died on 16 November 2022, at the age of 86.

== Influence ==
Allmand's pioneering work on the social history of the Hundred Years' War opened up new avenues of interest and research. Bilingual by virtue of a French mother, his comprehensive knowledge of French national and departmental archives, not to mention libraries and archives across Europe, enabled him to find and explore sources little-known or used by other scholars. For example, his knowledge of the archives of the Caen chambre des comptes and its chequered history opened up a key source for others.

Indeed, Allmand never strayed far from sources, whether printed or archival, and this familiarity with their uses and abuses made him, among much else, an expert editor of the work of others, most notably volume 7 of the New Cambridge Medieval History. He edited several collections of essays in meticulous but supportive fashion. His own published interests were eclectic: spies and spying, civil lawyers, medieval Cheshire, diplomacy and military strategy were just a few.

Perhaps his best-known work is a magisterial biography of Henry V, published as part of the authoritative Yale English Monarchs series. This work goes far beyond the orthodox Shakespeare-dominated image of a king at war and places this complex monarch in an appropriate context of, for example, wide-ranging respect from chroniclers and contemporaries for the good governance and law and order considered essential to successful medieval kingship.

Among other aspects of his research interest were concerns for the non-combatant, and in particular, taking a lead from H J Hewitt's innovative The Organisation of War under Edward III in what might be termed the logistics and practicalities of how medieval warfare were conducted and changed across two centuries.

Allmand's generous scholarship and bilingualism enabled him to work closely with leading French historians of the Hundred Years' War, including Professor Philippe Contamine and Professor Jean-Philippe Genet. His kindness towards and encouragement of younger scholars were, to deploy an overused term, legendary, and his wisdom is regularly cited by many historians with an interest in Anglo-Norman and Anglo-French themes such as Professor Anne Curry. He presented regularly at conferences in Normandy and France and published numerous articles in French. His final collection of articles, brought together as Aspects of War in the Late Middle Ages, included a number of pieces translated by Allmand from French to English.

== Select publications ==
- Allmand, Christopher (1968). Henry V (1st edition; second revised edition 2014 ed.). London: Historical Association.
- Society at War. The Experience of England and France during the Hundred Years' War, ed. C.T.Allmand (new edition). Boydell and Brewer. 1973. ISBN 9780851156729
- Allmand, Christopher (1983). Lancastrian Normandy 1415-1450, The History of a Medieval Occupation. Oxford: Clarendon Press. ISBN 9780198226420.
- Henry V (English Monarchs Series). Berkeley and Los Angeles. University of California Press. 1992. ISBN 9780520082939
- The Hundred Years War: England and France at War, c.1300-c.1450 (2nd ed.). Cambridge: Cambridge University Press. 2001 [1988]. ISBN 0521264995.
- The New Cambridge Medieval History: Volume 7, c.1415-c.1500. Cambridge: Cambridge University Press. 1998. ISBN 0521382963.
- Allmand, Christopher (2000). War, Government and Power in Late Medieval France. Liverpool: Liverpool University Press. ISBN 9780853237051.
- Allmand, Christopher (2011). The De Re Militari of Vegetius. Cambridge: Cambridge University Press. ISBN 9781107000278.
- Aspects of War in the Late Middle Ages. London: Routledge. 2022 ISBN 9780367330675
