= Mogaung =

Town in Kachin State, Myanmar

Mogaung မိုးကောင်း (မိူင်းၵွင်း)
- Town
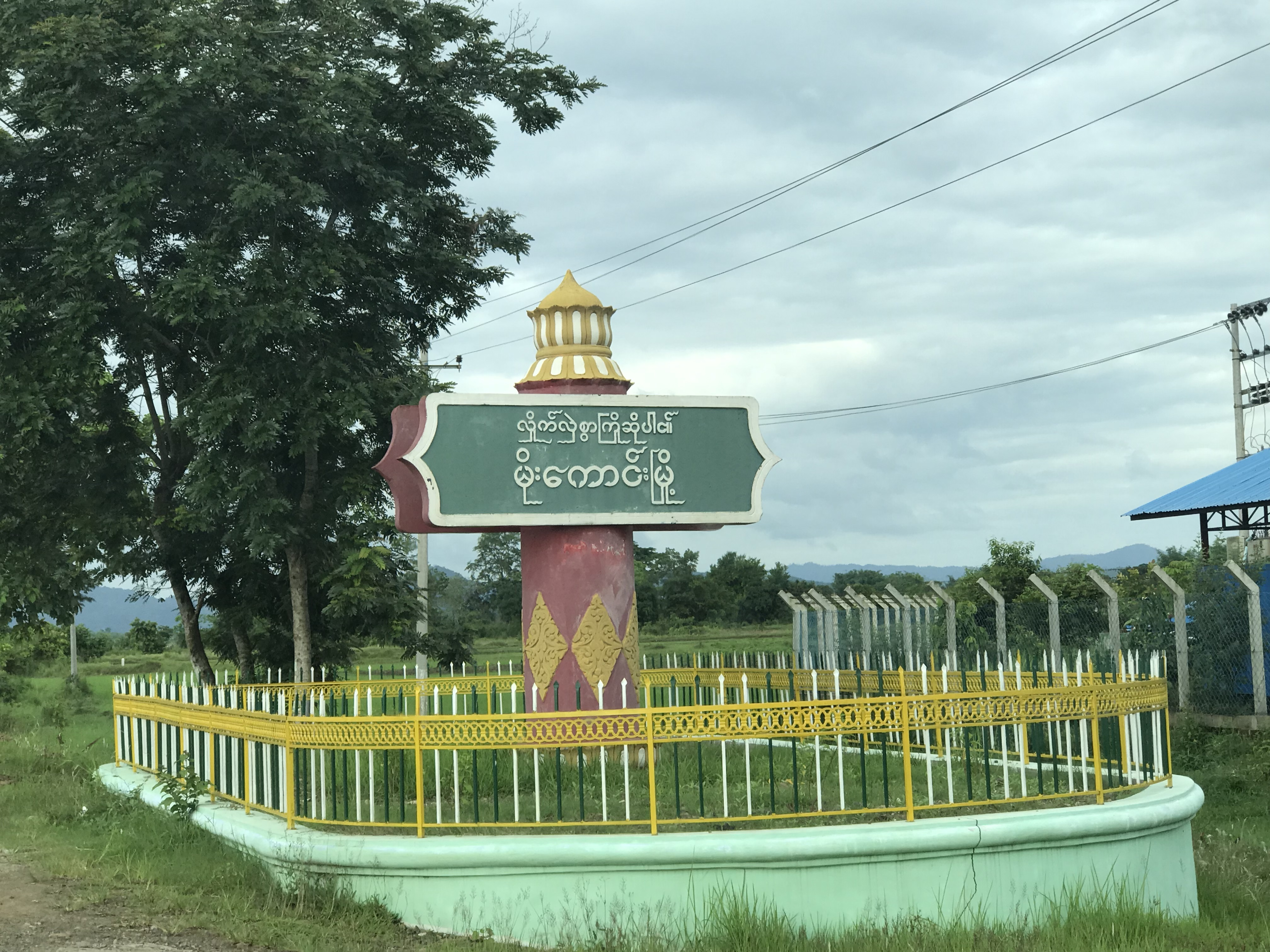

- Location in Burma
- Coordinates: 25°18′05″N 96°56′30″E
- Country: Myanmar
- Division: Kachin State
- District: Mohnyin District
- Township: Mogaung Township

Population (2014)
  - Total: 132,608
  - Religions: Buddhism Christianity
- Time zone: UTC+6.30 (MST)

Mogaung (Burmese: မိုးကောင်း [móɡáʊɰ̃]; Shan: မိူင်းၵွင်း) is a town in Kachin State, Myanmar. It is situated on the Mandalay-Myitkyina railway line. It's near the capital city state Myitkyina.

== History ==
Mogaung or Möng Kawng was the name and capital (royal seat) of a relatively major one of the petty Shan (ethnic Tai) principalities. It was ruled by a saopha (Burmese: sawbwa; Shan-prince of the highest rank), since that state was founded (according to legend in 58BC, under the ritual name Udiri Pale), interrupted by Chinese imperial occupations in 1479–1483 and 1495 and Burmese occupations in 1651–1742 and 1771–1775 until its annexation in 1796 by the Ava-based kingdom of Burma.

In June 1944 during World War II the then heavily-defended town was the site of a three-week battle when the 77th Chindit Brigade under Brigadier Michael Calvert, later assisted by Chinese forces of Generalissimo Chiang Kai-shek, fought-for and captured Mogaung from the occupying forces of Imperial Japan. For their behaviour during the fighting two members of the 3rd/6th Gurkha Rifles, Captain Michael Allmand, and Rifleman Tul Bahadur Pun, were each subsequently awarded the Victoria Cross, in Allmand's case, posthumously. At the time of the battle Calvert's Chindit force had been behind enemy lines for three months as part of Operation Thursday.

== Sources ==
- WorldStatesMen – Burma/Myanmar – Shan&Karen states (which lists the last rulers)
