= Howe & Co =

Firm of solicitors in Ealing, London, England

- Headquarters: Brentford, London, England
- No. of employees: 100

Howe & Co Solicitors is a firm of human rights solicitors based in Brentford, London, England. The firm has in excess of 100 staff, and specialises in human rights cases, employment law, defamation, civil litigation, public law and personal injury litigation (including medical negligence).

== Background ==
The firm has three partners, Martin Howe BA (Hons), Kieran O'Rourke LLB (Hons), and David Enright LLB (Hons), all solicitors.

The firm has been involved in several high-profile cases, including human rights claims following the Stansted Airport hijacking in February 2000, the criminal cases and human rights claims following the 3-day siege at the Greek Embassy in February 1999, and the successful House of Lords challenge to the safety of France for asylum seekers (R v Secretary of State for the Home Department ex parte Adan & Aitseguer (2001) 2 AC 477).

Howe & Co currently acts for approximately 2,000 British Army Gurkha veterans who are challenging the British Government's refusal to allow them a right to settle and live in the UK. The firm was instructed by Tul Bahadur Pun VC, an 84-year-old Gurkha veteran who won Britain's highest military award for gallantry, the Victoria Cross, during the Second World War. Mr Tul Bahdur Pun VC was refused a right to settle in the United Kingdom. Howe & Co set up a website to assist Mr Pun VC's campaign to win the right to settle in the United Kingdom named. On 1 June 2007, the British Asylum & Immigration Minister, Liam Byrne, stated that due to the "exceptional" nature of the case, Mr Pun VC would be allowed to live in the United Kingdom. Along with actress Joanna Lumley, Peter Carroll, and Sir Jack Hayward, Howe & Co's Senior Partner, Martin Howe, is one of the "Gurkha Justice Campaign" organisers. The Gurkha Justice Campaign is seeking a change in the UK law to allow all Gurkhas the right to live in Britain. On 30 September 2008 Howe & Co won a High Court of Justice legal challenge to the British Home Office's policy refusing Gurkhas who retired prior to 1997 the right to settle in the UK, in a decision which could open the door to 2,000 retired Gurkhas being allowed to live in Britain.

The head of the firm's Human Rights and Immigration Department, David Howe, is currently involved in representing a number of foreign nationals facing deportation by the British Home Office, following criminal conviction in the United Kingdom, and also a test case against the Home Office's decision to exclude unaccompanied minors from the Family Indefinite Leave to Remain Policy introduced in October 2003.

In January 2009 Howe & Co were instructed by the former radio presenter and The Sun columnist, Jon Gaunt, to pursue a legal action against the Talksport radio station following termination of his radio presenter contract, after an interview with Redbridge Council's Michael Stark on 7 November 2008, in which Jon Gaunt branded Councillor Stark a "Nazi" and "an ignorant pig" live on air.

The firm holds the Specialist Quality Mark (SQM) awarded by the Legal Services Commission and, following an independent "Peer Review" audit of Howe & Co's publicly funded legal work, the Legal Services Commission and the Institute of Advance Legal Studies awarded the firm a rating of: "1 - Excellence".

In June 2006, one of the firm's partners, David Enright, was shortlisted for a Law Society sponsored award at the Legal Aid Practitioners' Group's "Legal Aid Lawyer of the Year Awards 2006". In November 2008, Howe & Co's Senior Partner, Martin Howe, was jointly awarded the Ross McWhirter Foundation Award for citizenship for his work on the Gurkha Justice campaign. In December 2008, Martin Howe was also shortlisted for the award of "Human Rights Lawyer of the Year" by Liberty and JUSTICE in an award sponsored by the Law Society of England and Wales. In announcing the shortlisting, the Law Society of England and Wales stated:

"The outstanding achievements of human rights champions across England and Wales have been recognised by the judges of the Human Rights Awards 2008. Exceptional legal professionals and other human rights champions have been short-listed for the awards, which recognise their vital work in the promotion and protection of human rights."

Howe & Co's personal injury lawyers are members of the Association of Personal Injury Lawyers (APIL), and the firm is regulated by the Law Society of England and Wales.
