= St Edward the Confessor Church, Golders Green =

Coordinates: 51.5765°N 0.1964°W

St Edward the Confessor Church
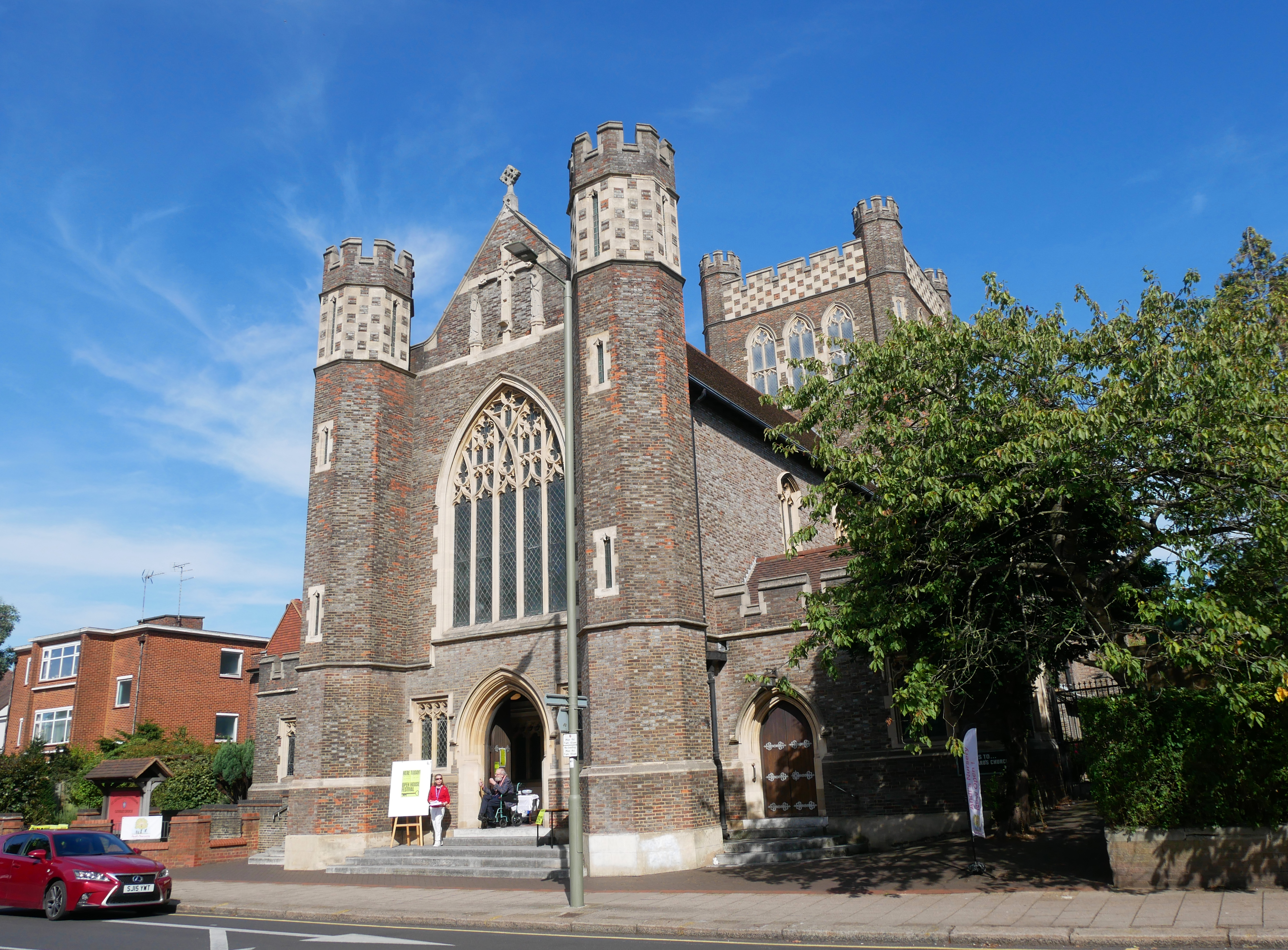
- Southwest view of the church
- St Edward the Confessor Church
- Location: Golders Green
- Country: England
- Denomination: Catholic
- Website: Official website

History
- Status: Parish church
- Founder: Fr William Bendon
- Dedication: Edward the Confessor

Architecture
- Functional status: Active
- Heritage designation: Grade II listed
- Designated: 4 March 2016
- Architect: Arthur Young
- Style: Gothic Revival
- Groundbreaking: 25 March 1914
- Completed: 13 October 1915
- Construction cost: £10,000

Administration
- Province: Westminster
- Archdiocese: Westminster
- Deanery: Barnet
- Parish: Golders Green

St Edward the Confessor Church is a Catholic parish church in Temple Fortune, Golders Green, Borough of Barnet, London. It was built from 1914 to 1915, and designed by Arthur Young in the Gothic Revival style. It is located on the Finchley Road, on the corner with Hoop Lane, next to Golders Green Jewish Cemetery. In 2016, it was designated a Grade II listed building.

== History ==
=== Foundation ===
Before a mission was started in Golders Green in 1908, Catholics living there had to travel to Our Lady of Dolours Church in Hendon or St Agnes Church in Cricklewood. In 1906, plans for nearby Hampstead Garden Suburb were enacted, something that would increase the population of the local area. In 1908, a priest, Fr William Bendon, began working in Golders Green. He was the chaplain to a Carmelite Convent on Bridge Lane, whose chapel was open for public worship. In July 1909, the site for the new church was bought and a presbytery and temporary chapel was built nearby. In 1911, St Edward's Hall was built. It was to be both the parish hall and a temporary church until a larger one would be ready. It was dedicated to Edward the Confessor as it was Edward who had given the historical lands to the Benedictines. St Edward's Hall cost £1,000 and could accommodate 300 people.

=== Construction ===
On 25 March 1914, the foundation stone of the church was laid. Cardinal Francis Bourne, Archbishop of Westminster presided at the ceremony. The architect was Arthur Young, who designed the church in the Gothic Revival style. The total cost of the church came to £10,000. As construction was going on during the First World War, the builders were those who were too old to be called up for the war effort. By September 1915, the construction on the church had finished, and the opening was scheduled for 8 September 1915. However, the opening was delayed because of a Zeppelin raid on London that evening. The church was opened a month later, on 13 October 1915, the feast day of St Edward the Confessor, in ceremony again presided over by Cardinal Bourne. In 1920, the founder of the mission and church, Fr Bendon died. Originally, before being reinterred in a grave outside walls of the church, he was buried in East Finchley Cemetery. In 1930, the church was consecrated by Bishop Joseph Butt, an auxiliary bishop of Westminster. In 1940, for the 25th anniversary of the church, statues of English saints and blesseds, made by Philip Lindsey Clark, were installed in the reredos. In 1997, St Edward’s Shrine was made in the church.

== Parish ==
In 1909, the Daughters of Wisdom arrived in the parish, after six years teaching in Cricklewood, and started La Sagesse Convent with a school attached to it. In 1970, 15 sisters were working in the school, but it has since closed and there are no Catholic schools in the parish. The church has three Sunday Masses at 9:00 am, 10:30 am and 6:00 pm.

== See also ==
- Michael Allmand
- Arthur John Allmand
