= James Campbell Brown =

Scottish chemist (1843–1910)

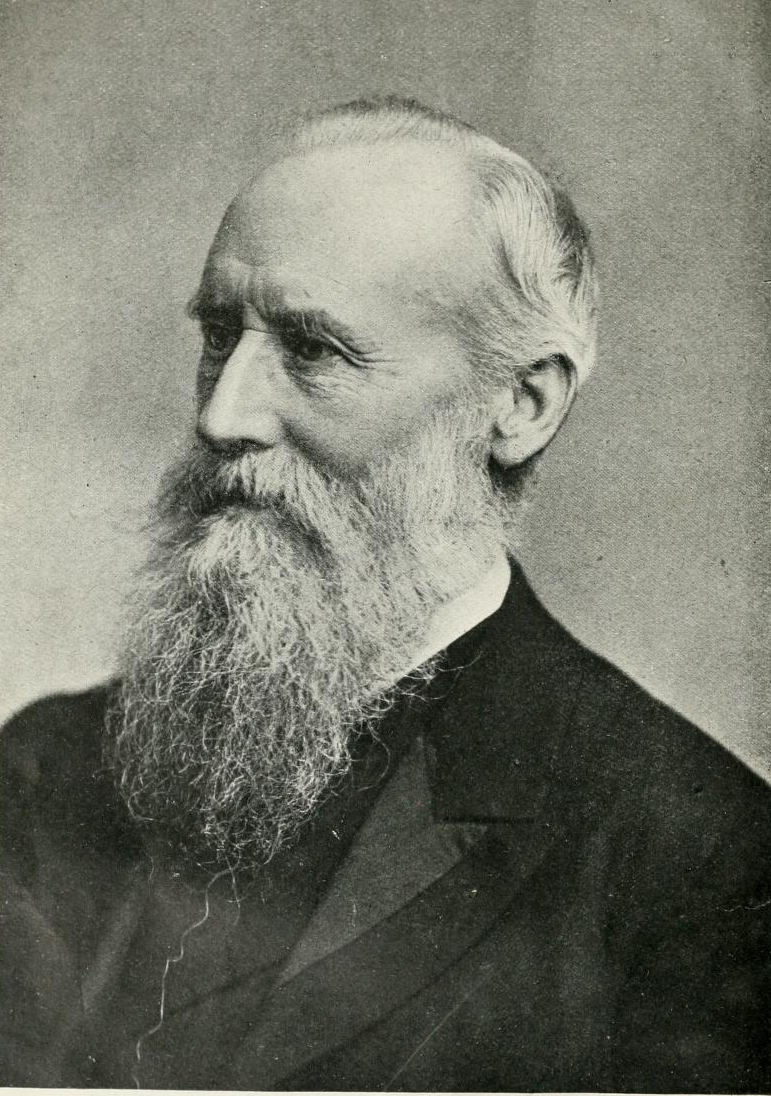

James Campbell Brown (31 January 1843 – 14 March 1910) was a chemist and professor who taught at Liverpool. He is best known for a book on the history of chemistry.

Brown was born in Aberdeen where his father George Brown lived while also working as a chemical manufacturer in London at Bow Common Alum Works. Brown was educated at the Old Aberdeen Gymnasium under Dr Alexander Anderson (1808-1884) and then at the Marischal College. In 1863 he joined the Royal College of Chemistry, London, studying under John Tyndall, August Wilhelm von Hofmann and others. He graduated with a BSc in 1867 and received a university scholarship leading to a doctorate in 1870. He taught chemistry at Aberdeen and then went to lecture at the Liverpool Royal Infirmary School of Medicine. He married Ellen Fullarton, daughter of John Henderson of Aberdeenshire in 1872. He also taught at the School of Medicine in Liverpool. Campbell was involved in the creation of the University of Liverpool. In 1881 he was made chair of chemistry endowed by a Mr Grant of Rock Ferry. He was also involved in water quality studies for the City of Liverpool Water Works. As a specialist also on forensic chemistry he was often called as an expert in court cases. A member of the Society of Chemical Industry, he also undertook soil and plant nutrient studies and suggested a fertilizer for the tea industry in India. He died from a heart attack following influenza. His wife Ellen died in 1923 and she had been instructed by her husband to set aside from the value of his estate, money for the establishment of a chair in chemistry at the University of Liverpool after her death. In 1925, a chair of industrial chemistry was accordingly created and Thomas Percy Hilditch appointed.

Professor Brown was buried at All Saints Churchyard, Childwall, Liverpool.
