= J. Gray Lucas =

American politician (1864–1944)

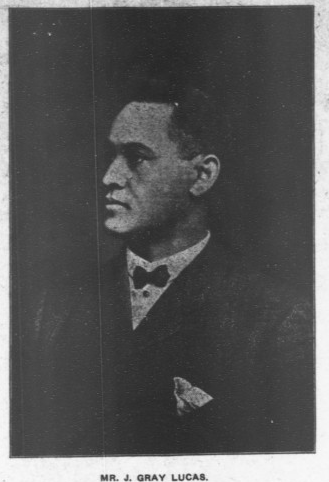
John Gray Lucas

John Gray Lucas (March 11, 1864– October 27, 1944) was a lawyer and a state legislator in Arkansas during the early 20th century. He was appointed Assistant U.S. attorney in Cook County in 1934. Born in Marshall, Texas, in 1864, he eventually moved to Pine Bluff, Arkansas. He graduated from Branch Normal College of Arkansas Industrial University (now University of Arkansas at Pine Bluff). He then got his law degree from Boston University School of Law in 1887, graduating with honors as the only African-American student in his class. He moved to Chicago.

He was born in Marshall, Texas. He graduated with honors from Boston University Law School and became a lawyer.

Upon returning to Pine Bluff, he was appointed commissioner for the U.S. Circuit Court, Eastern District of Arkansas. In 1890, he was elected as a state representative for the Arkansas General Assembly. It was during this time, and amidst a growing level of racial tension across the south, that he delivered a speech in February 1891 demanding that Jim Crow Laws not be extended to the Arkansas railway system. Although the measure was passed, Lucas earned the admiration of his white counterparts.

He served in the Arkansas Legislature in 1891. He represented Jefferson County. He was included in a photo montage of African American state legislators serving in Arkansas in 1891 published in The Freeman newspaper in Indianapolis.

He served as a state representative in Arkansas in 1891. In the Arkansas House Lucas opposed J. N. Tillman's segregated coach bill. It passed. Other bills disenfranchised African Americans and blocked them from holding public office. He moved to Chicago not long after. The same year he left Arkansas for Chicago where he became a successful and prominent attorney including on cases heard by the U.S. Supreme Court.

Lucas left Arkansas for Chicago, Illinois, in 1893. He became known as an expert in criminal law, and held an office at 88 Dearborn Avenue in the Chicago Loop. He appeared before the United States Supreme Court four times. He moved to Chicago, Illinois and served in various public offices.

He became an assistant U.S. attorney in 1934 in Franklin D. Roosevelt's administration. He served as United States Commissioner in the Eastern District of Kansas in 1893. He appeared before the U.S. Supreme Court four times. He became a Democrat in the 1930s and was sppointed an Assistant U.S. Attorney by Franklin D. Roosevelt. He was married to Olive Gulliver Lucas and had a daughter, Elaine Louise Lucas. He died in 1944 and is buried at Chicago's Lincoln Cemetery.
