= Jean-Philippe Genet =

French medievalist

Jean-Philippe Genet (born in 1944) is a French medievalist, specialist of England.

== Publications ==
- 1996: Les idées sociales et politiques en Angleterre du début du XIVe siècle au milieu du XVIe siècle, Thèse d'État, Paris-I.
- 1997: La genèse de l'État moderne. Actes de la recherche en sciences sociales. Vol. 118, June. Genèse de l’État moderne. (pp. 3–18). Read online
- 2003: La genèse de l'Etat moderne. Culture et société politique en Angleterre, Paris, PUF, 2003.
- 2003: with Michel Balard and Michel Rouche, Le Moyen Âge en Occident. Hachette Éducation, collection Histoire Université
- 2004: with M. Balard, Le monde au Moyen Âge. Espaces, pouvoirs, civilisations, Paris, Hachette.
- 2005: Les îles britanniques au Moyen Âge, Paris, Hachette.
