= John Lucas (British Army officer) =

John Lucas

John George Anderson Lucas MC (25 April 1921 – 24 May 2013) was a British Army officer of the Second World War who won the Military Cross in 1944 for his actions attacking Japanese machine gun posts while serving with the Chindits (6th Queen Elizabeth's Own Gurkha Rifles) in Burma. Michael Allmand won a posthumous Victoria Cross for his part in the same events. Later, Lucas contracted sandfly fever and was left unconscious in a foxhole with just a gun, some bullets and water. Waking a day or two later, he walked for several days to catch up with his men, who were astonished to see him emaciated but alive. He was soon back in action. After the war, Lucas returned to Aylesbury to manage JP Lucas & Co., the family furnishing business.
