= John R. Lukacs =

American anthropologist

- Born: March 1, 1947 (age 79); Oregon, U.S.
- Occupation: Anthropologist

John R. Lukacs (born March 1, 1947) is an American anthropologist. He received a PhD in 1977 from Cornell University, where he was a student of Kenneth A.R. Kennedy. Lukacs was a professor in the Department of Anthropology at the University of Oregon in Eugene.

His research focuses on physical anthropology, dental evolution, paleopathology, and dental anthropology. He has worked extensively on health and human adaptation in the prehistory of South Asia. Much of this work focuses on odontometrics, dental morphology, tooth development, and pathology. He has also performed dental anthropological analyses on hominin ancestors and non-human primates, particularly concerning an enamel defect named Localized Hypoplasia of the Primary Canines).
