= Indian Armoured Corps =

The Indian Armoured Corps was a unit of the British Empire's Indian Army. The Corps was formed on 1 May 1941 to administer existing armoured units within the Indian Army. Its headquarters was located at Ferozepore. Upon partition in 1947, the unit's assets and personnel were both split between the Indian Army and the Pakistan Army, with two-thirds (including all the unit's training establishments, none of which were sited in what became Pakistan) becoming the Indian Army Armoured Corps and one third becoming the Pakistan Armoured Corps.
