= Tul Bahadur Pun Magar =

Nepalese Gurkha recipient of the Victoria Cross

Tul Bahadur Pun Magar VC
- तुल बहादुर पुन मगर
- Tul Bahadur Pun VC in 2007.
- Born: 23 March 1923; Myagdi, Nepal
- Died: 20 April 2011 (aged 88); Myagdi, Nepal
- Military career
- Allegiance: British India; United Kingdom
- Branch: British Indian Army; British Army
- Service years: 1939 - 1959
- Rank: Lieutenant
- Units: 6th Queen Elizabeth's Own Gurkha Rifles
- Conflicts: World War II; Malayan Emergency
- Awards: Victoria Cross

Tul Bahadur Pun Magar VC VC (Nepali: तुल बहादुर पुन मगर; 23 March 1923 – 20 April 2011) was a Nepalese Gurkha recipient of the Victoria Cross, the highest award for gallantry in the face of the enemy that can be awarded to British and Commonwealth forces. He later achieved the rank of Honorary Lieutenant. In addition to the Victoria Cross, Pun was awarded 10 other medals, including the Burma Star.

== Victoria Cross ==
Pun was 21 years old, and a Rifleman in the 3rd Battalion, 6th Gurkha Rifles, in the Indian Army during World War II when the following deed took place for which he was awarded the Victoria Cross:

On 23 June 1944 at Mogaung, Burma, during an attack on the railway bridge, a section of one of the platoons was wiped out with the exception of Rifleman Tul Bahadur Pun, his section commander and one other. The section commander immediately led a charge on the enemy position but was at once badly wounded, as was the third man. Rifleman Pun, with a Bren gun continued the charge alone in the face of shattering fire and reaching the position, killed three of the occupants and put five more to flight, capturing two light machine-guns and much ammunition. He then gave accurate supporting fire, enabling the rest of his platoon to reach their objective.

=== Citation ===
War Office, 9th November, 1944

The KING has been graciously pleased to approve the award of the VICTORIA CROSS to:-

No. 10119 Rifleman Tulbahadur Pun, 6th Gurkha Rifles, Indian Army.

In Burma on 23 June 1944, a Battalion of the 6th Gurkha Rifles was ordered to attack the Railway Bridge at Mogaung. Immediately the attack developed the enemy opened concentrated and sustained cross fire at close range from a position known as the Red House and from a strong bunker position two hundred yards to the left of it.

The cross fire was so intense that both the leading platoons of 'B' Company, one of which was Rifleman Tulbahadur Pun's, were pinned to the ground and the whole of his Section was wiped out with the exception of himself, the Section commander and one other man. The Section commander immediately led the remaining two men in a charge on the Red House but was at once badly wounded. Rifleman Tulbahadur Pun and his remaining companion continued the charge, but the latter too was immediately wounded.

Rifleman Tulbahadur Pun then seized the Bren Gun, and firing from the hip as he went, continued the charge on this heavily bunkered position alone, in the face of the most shattering concentration of automatic fire, directed straight at him. With the dawn coming up behind him, he presented a perfect target to the Japanese. He had to move for thirty yards over open ground, ankle deep in mud, through shell holes and over fallen trees.

Despite these overwhelming odds, he reached the Red House and closed with the Japanese occupants. He killed three and put five more to flight and captured two light machine guns and much ammunition. He then gave accurate supporting fire from the bunker to the remainder of his platoon which enabled them to reach their objective.

His outstanding courage and superb gallantry in the face of odds which meant almost certain death were most inspiring to all ranks and beyond praise.

— Supplement to the London Gazette, 7 November 1944 (dated 9 November 1944)

Despite the above text, Pun told a different story in an interview. He told that he had killed four with his gun and three with his kukri. Later he took a flamethrower and killed a further 30 Japanese in a dugout.

Pun was invited, along with other Victoria Cross recipients, to the coronation of Queen Elizabeth II on 2 June 1953. He attended the ceremony at Westminster Abbey, and was invited to the party afterwards at Buckingham Palace.

He made several visits to the United Kingdom, particularly to meet with other members of the Victoria Cross and George Cross Association. He had tea with Queen Elizabeth The Queen Mother.

== Memorials ==
=== London ===
Pun's name is inscribed on the roof of an arched memorial stand at the Memorial Gates, at Constitution Hill, London (at the junction with Duke of Wellington Place, London SW1), along with other volunteers from the Indian subcontinent, Africa, and the Caribbean, who served with the Armed Forces during the First and Second World Wars and received the Victoria Cross or George Cross. The memorial with his name inscribed is directly outside the walled gardens of Buckingham Palace.

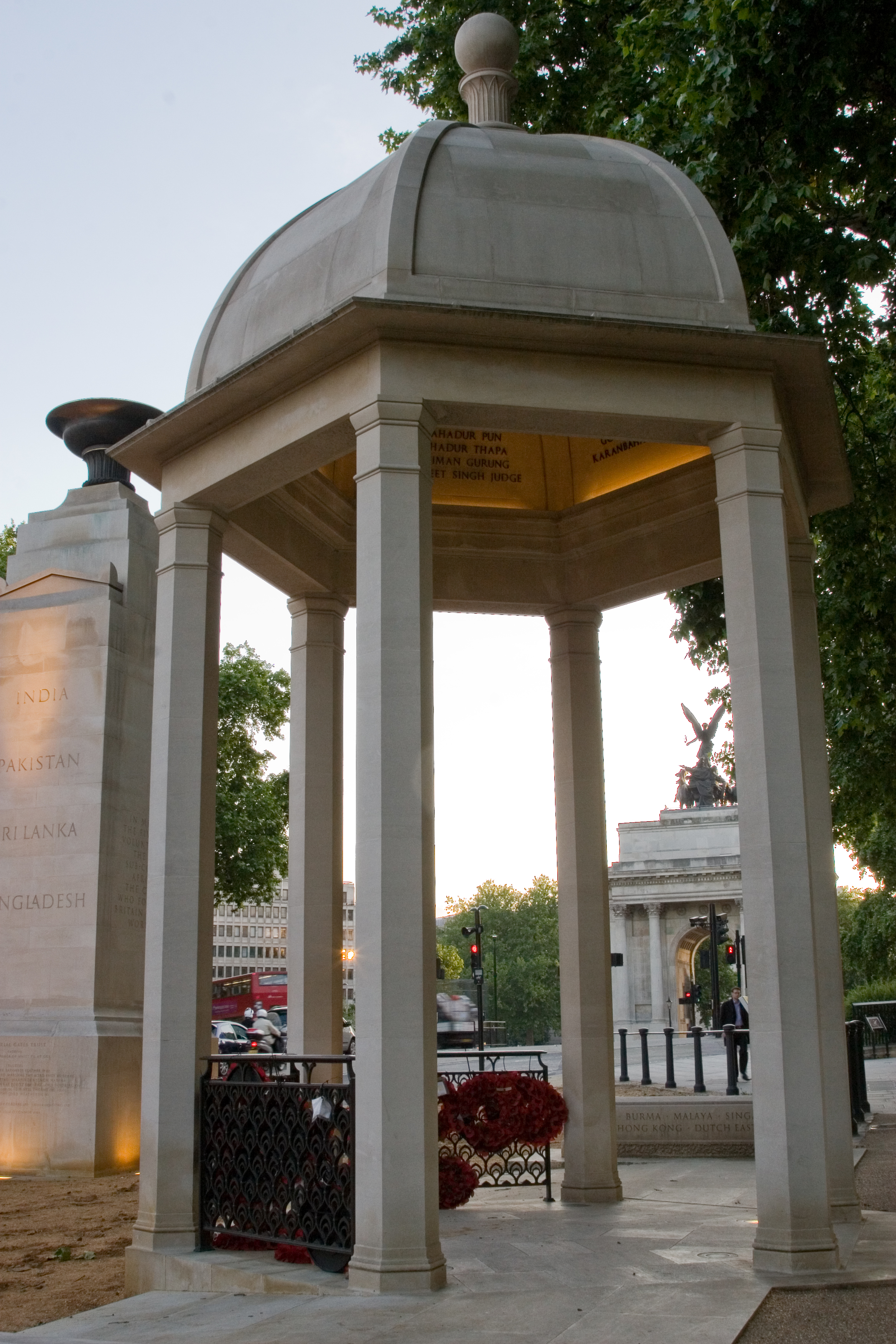
"Memorial Gates", Constitution Hill, London SW1

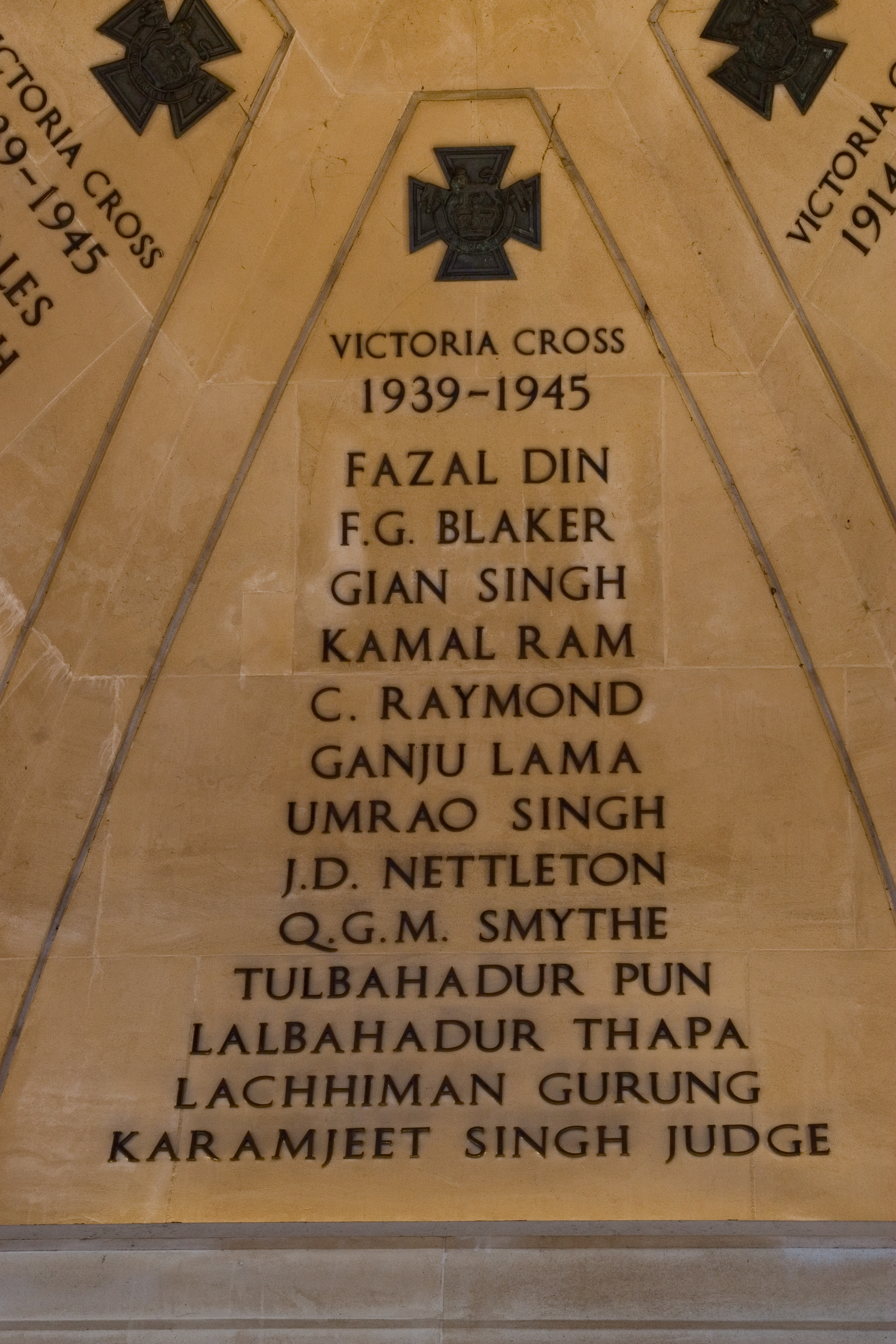
Inscription of Tul Bahadur Pun VC's name on the "Memorial Gates" at Constitution Hill, London SW1

In addition, as a recipient of the Victoria Cross, his name is inscribed on memorials at Westminster Abbey and the Union Jack Club, in London, and on the "Memorial to the Chindits" on the north side of the Victoria Embankment next to the Ministry of Defence headquarters in London.

=== Other ===
He has also had a Great Western Railway operated IET unit named after him.

== Immigration controversy ==
In later life Pun suffered from ill-health, including heart problems, asthma and diabetes. He had difficulties getting medical attention and the medical supplies in Nepal, which were needed to keep him alive. He lived at the foothills of the Himalayas in Nepal at 4,000 feet. His house has no proper roof, no electricity, and no running water. In a statement given to his solicitors, Howe & Co, of Ealing, West London, Mr Pun stated that his home had no sanitation and that he was therefore obliged to dig a hole in the surrounding fields to serve as a toilet. He told the British press that he was in constant fear of landslides during the Nepalese monsoon season.

Pun received a British Army pension of £132 per month. In order to receive his monthly pension he had to be driven for three hours and then walk for one full day (being carried by two or three men in a wicker basket) to the Gurkha army camp at Pokhara. If he had ever failed to appear in person at the camp, he would not have received that month's pension.

Pun applied in 2006 to the British Embassy in Kathmandu, Nepal, for a visa to settle in the United Kingdom, particularly because of his ill-health and his desire to be with his veteran comrades in the United Kingdom. A British Entry Clearance Officer refused his application for settlement on the ground that he had "failed to demonstrate strong ties with the UK".

Pun then lodged an appeal against the immigration decision through his solicitors, Howe & Co. The immigration appeal was listed to be heard in August 2007 in London. On 1 June 2007, following widespread media publicity of the British public's support of Pun's case, the then Minister of State for Immigration Liam Byrne announced:

The circumstances surrounding Tul Bahadur Pun's case are clearly exceptional, and in the light of this the Home Secretary, John Reid, and I have reviewed the case and made the decision to grant Mr Pun a settlement visa immediately.

This decision was not taken lightly and reflects the extraordinary nature of this case, in particular Mr Pun's heroic record in service of Britain which saw him awarded the Victoria Cross. It is entirely right that this record should not only be recognised but honoured.

There has always been scope to grant settlement in the UK to ex-Gurkhas who have retired before July 1997, and who do not meet the requirements in the immigration rules. As on this occasion, discretion may be exercised on a case by case basis. We have also taken into consideration his current medical condition.

— then Minister of State for Immigration Liam Byrne

Pun began his journey to Britain on 1 July 2007. Around one thousand people turned up to see him off. There were traditional Nepali bands outside his home and a motorcade of around 30-50 cars and motorbikes took him to the airport so he could fly to Kathmandu. One of those who turned up to say farewell was old Gurkha friend and fellow VC recipient Lachhiman Gurung, 90, who lost a hand to a Japanese grenade in 1945.

He finally arrived at London, Heathrow, on 4 July and was met with an official guard of honour. Col David Hayes, of the Royal Gurkha Rifles, saluted him and said: "I wish to emphasise the manner in which he's revered by serving Gurkhas. His reputation goes before us into battle." Pun was then driven by limousine to a reception to meet hundreds of members of the public who had helped to bring him to Britain. The reception included many representatives from The Gurkha Ex-Servicemen's Organisation (GAESO)—and from the Army Rumour Service website.

Eighty-four-year-old Pun holding a campaign poster from British supporters for his right to settle in Great Britain.

Pun commented, "I have never had so much respect as in these two days, leaving Kathmandu and arriving in Britain."

== Death ==
On 20 April 2011, aged 88, after suffering severe respiratory ailments, Pun died unexpectedly in his home village of Myagdi, Nepal. He had briefly returned to see the completion of a school for the village, a project which he had been involved with.

== Decorations and medals ==

Ribbon	Description	Notes
	Victoria Cross (VC)	1944
	1939–45 Star	
	Burma Star	
	War Medal	
	India Service Medal	
	General Service Medal (1918)	* Malaya clasp
	Queen Elizabeth II Coronation Medal	1953
	Queen Elizabeth II Silver Jubilee Medal	1977
	Queen Elizabeth II Golden Jubilee Medal	2002
	Long Service and Good Conduct Medal (Army)	
	Indian Independence Medal	1949
	Pingat Jasa Malaysia	2005

His Victoria Cross is displayed at The Gurkha Museum, Winchester, Hampshire England.

== Gallery ==
Tul Bahadur Pun's Victoria Cross (left), 1939-1945 Star (middle), Burma Star (right)

All 11 of Tul Bahadur Pun's medals on display at the Gurkha Museum, Winchester

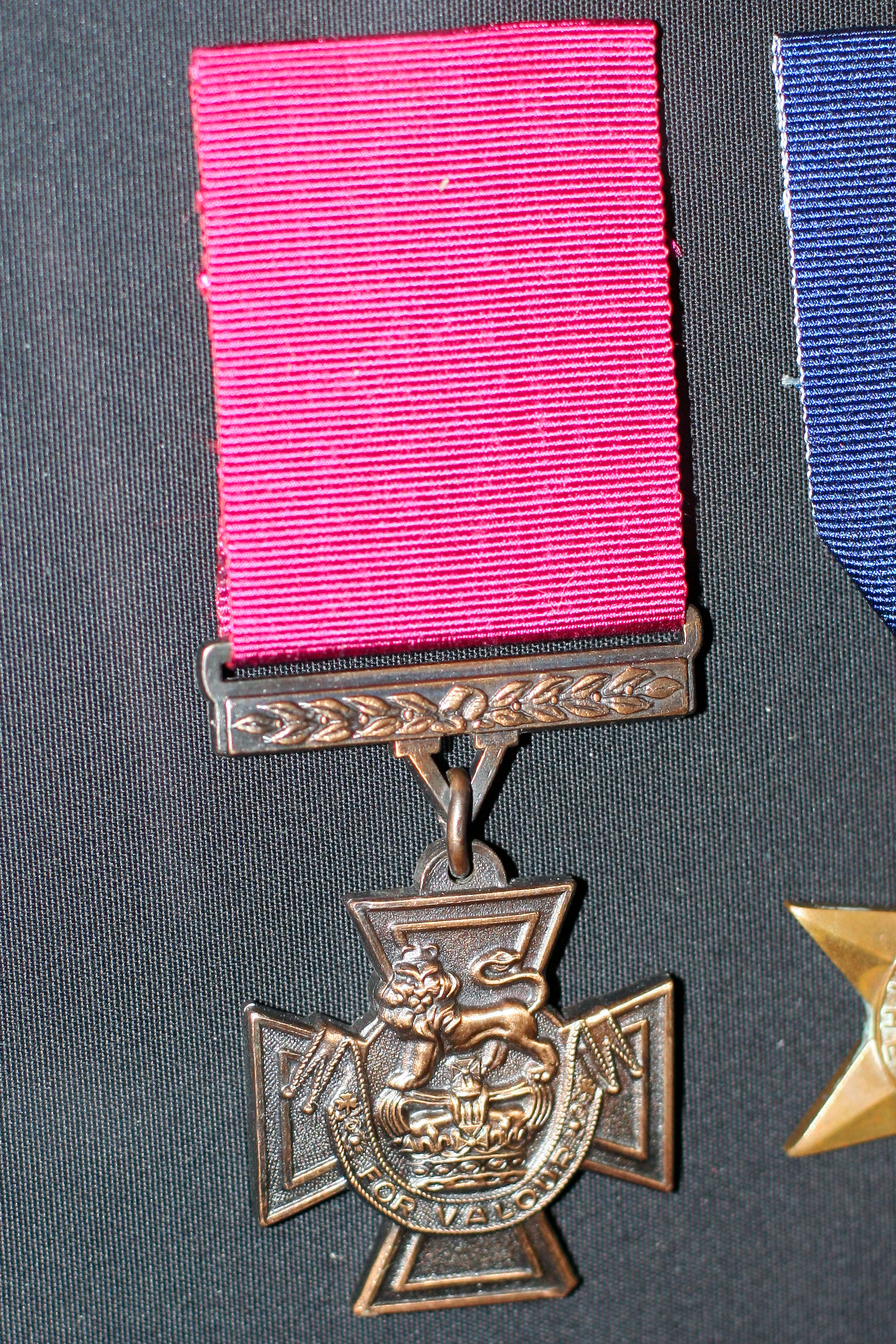
VC of Tul Bahadur Pun

== See also ==
- List of Brigade of Gurkhas recipients of the Victoria Cross
- Dipprasad Pun - Grandson, awarded Conspicuous Gallantry Cross for single-handedly defeating 12-30 Taliban insurgents
