= 6th Queen Elizabeth's Own Gurkha Rifles =

- Active: 1817–1994
- Country: India; United Kingdom; Nepal
- Branch: British Army
- Type: Rifles
- Role: Light Infantry
- Size: 1–4 battalions (One: 1817–1903, two: 1903–68, three: 1940–47, four: 1941–46)
- Garrison/HQ: British Hong Kong
- Colors: Green; faced black
- March: Young May Moon (Quick March)
- Engagements: Third Anglo-Burmese War Great War: Gallipoli campaign; Persian campaign; Mesopotamian campaign; Second World War: Italian campaign; Burma campaign; Malayan Emergency Confrontation
- Decorations: 2 VCs

Insignia
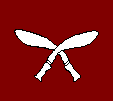
- Shoulder Flash
- Abbreviation: 6 GR

The 6th Queen Elizabeth's Own Gurkha Rifles was a rifle regiment of the British Indian Army, before being transferred to the British Army following India's independence. Originally raised in 1817 as part of the army of the British East India Company, the regiment has been known by a number of names throughout its history. Initially the unit did not recruit from the Gurkhas, although after being transferred to the British Indian Army following the Indian Rebellion of 1857, it became a purely Gurkha regiment, in due course with its regimental headquarters at Abbottabad in the North West Frontier Province of British India. After 1947 the regiment was one of only four Gurkha regiments to be transferred to the British Army and this continued up until 1994, when it was amalgamated with other Gurkha regiments to form the Royal Gurkha Rifles. Over the course of its 177-year history, the regiment was awarded 25 battle honours, although prior to World War I it had only been awarded one and no battle honours were awarded to it after World War II.

== History ==
=== Beginnings ===
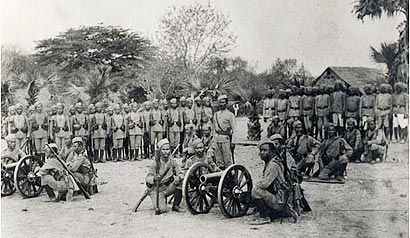
42nd Gurkha Light Infantry, c. 1890

The regiment was initially raised in 1817 as the Cuttack Legion as part of the army of the East India Company. This was a unit of Indian natives from the Cuttack City of Odisha area and initially it was used to maintain order in the region, before moving to Northern Bengal in 1823 when it became known as the Rungpoor Light Infantry.

During the Indian Rebellion of 1857 the regiment remained "loyal" to the British and two of its members were awarded with the Indian Order of Merit, which was the highest award that a Gurkha could receive until 1911 when Gurkhas became eligible for the Victoria Cross.

Following this, the regiment was transferred to the newly formed British Indian Army and as time passed, the regiment began recruiting Nepalese Gurkhas into its ranks—initially only two companies of Gurkhas were formed, but, over time, more and more were recruited until it eventually became a pure Gurkha regiment, being numbered as the 42nd Regiment of Goorkha Light Infantry in 1886. During the period before the First World War, the regiment was primarily involved in patrolling the north-east border of India, indeed it remained in eastern India for 77 years, and as such the regiment gained only a single battle honour up to 1914.

In 1899 the regiment moved from Assam to Abbottabad, in present-day Pakistan, and began operations on the North-West Frontier. In 1903, the regiment was also renumbered as the 6th Gurkha Rifles. A year later, a second battalion for the regiment was raised from a cadre taken from the 1st Battalion.

=== First World War ===
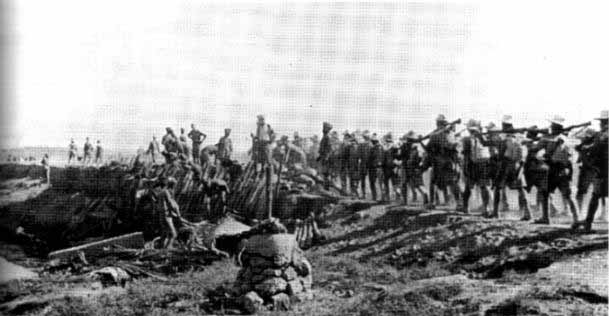
The 2nd Battalion, 6th Gurkha Rifles of 42nd Indian Brigade march towards the action of Khan Baghdadi

During the First World War the regiment was expanded further with the raising of a third battalion. The regiment served in a number of theatres during the war, including Persia, the Middle East, Turkey and Greece.

The 1st Battalion had the distinction of being the first Gurkha unit to arrive at Gallipoli, landing at Cape Helles on 25 April 1915. Their first major operation saw them attack an Ottoman position that was doing significant damage to Allied forces with machine guns—this involved them going up a 300-foot (91 metre) vertical slope which had defeated both the Royal Marine Light Infantry and the Royal Dublin Fusiliers—however, the Gurkhas gained the position with ease. Eighteen Gurkhas were killed in this action and another forty-two were wounded. For their sacrifice, this area is now known as Gurkha Bluff.

The 2nd Battalion meanwhile began service with the 2nd (Rawalpindi) Division and in April 1916 transferred to the new 15th Indian Division where it served the remainder of the war in Mesopotamia.

The 3rd Battalion was formed as the 3rd Gurkha Reserve Battalion on 5 February 1917 at Rawalpindi. In February 1918, it was transferred to the Bannu Brigade on the North East Frontier. With the brigade, it served in the Third Anglo-Afghan War in 1919. It was disbanded on 1 February 1921.

=== Inter-war years ===
Between the First and Second World Wars the regiment was reduced to two battalions once more and they returned to the North-West Frontier where they were employed on garrison duties.

=== Second World War ===
The Second World War saw the expansion of all ten Gurkha regiments of the British Indian Army, and the 6th Gurkhas raised a further two battalions, numbered as the 3rd and 4th Battalions. Over the course of the conflict, battalions of the regiment fought in Italy and Burma, and also in Waziristan on the North West Frontier (1940–41) where they served as garrison troops and saw action against Pathan tribesmen.

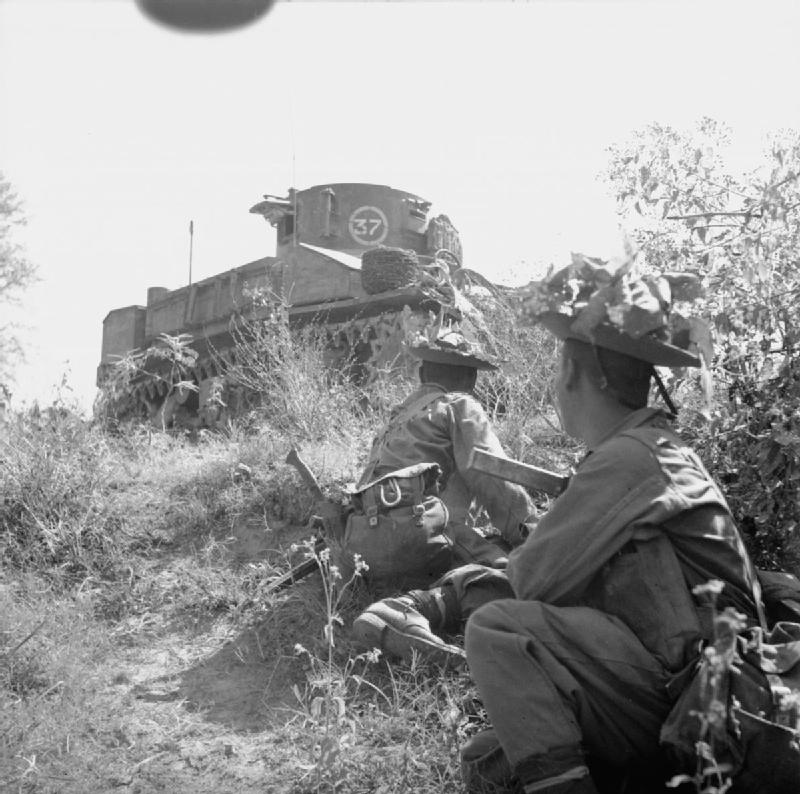
Men of the 6th Gurkha Rifles go into action at Singu on the Irrawaddy bridgehead with Stuart tanks in support, February 1945.

In January 1943 the 2nd Battalion was attached to the 3rd Indian Motor Brigade which had just returned from the Western Desert after being almost destroyed at the Battle of Gazala. At the end of the month the brigade was renamed as the 43rd Indian Infantry Brigade (Lorried). The brigade and its Gurkha battalions were sent to Italy in mid-1944 as an Independent brigade and fought in the Italian Campaign.

It was during the Burma Campaign, that the regiment received its first Victoria Cross, in fact two awards were made to members of the regiment for actions on the same day. Captain Michael Allmand and Rifleman Tulbahadur Pun were awarded the VC for their actions during the fighting around the Pin Hmi Road Bridge at the Battle of Mogaung in Burma on 23 June 1944 while serving with the 3rd Battalion who were taking part Operation Thursday, which was the second Chindit expedition. The 3rd Battalion's involvement in this operation proved very costly and they suffered 126 killed, 352 wounded and 7 missing. As well as the two previously mentioned VCs, members of the battalion also received the following awards: 2 DSOs, 3 IOMs, 6 MCs, 4 IDSMs, 12 MMs, 3 US Silver Stars.

=== Post 1947 ===
In 1946 the regiment was reduced to three battalions, following the disbandment of the 4th Battalion. A year later, India gained its independence and under the 1947 Tri Partite Agreement four regiments of the Brigade of Gurkhas were allocated to the British Army, while the other six were transferred to the newly formed independent Indian Army. The 6th Gurkhas were one of the regiments that were transferred to the British Army, although the 3rd Battalion was transferred to the 5th Royal Gurkha Rifles (Frontier Force), which was one of the battalions that had been allocated to the Indian Army, and the regiment was thus reduced to two battalions once more. In 1959, the regiment was renamed as the 6th Queen Elizabeth's Own Gurkha Rifles in honour of Elizabeth II.

As with other Gurkha regiments, the 6th Gurkhas primarily saw service in the Far East until the British withdrawal from East of Suez. Both battalions participated in the Malayan Emergency. Later, between 1962 and 1964, the 1st Battalion served in the United Kingdom. Between 1963 and 1966, both the 1st and 2nd Battalions saw service in Borneo during the Confrontation.

On 16 June 1969, the 6th Gurkhas was reduced to a single battalion, when the 1st and 2nd Battalions were amalgamated as the 1st Battalion. The single battalion continued to rotate with the other Gurkha regiments between Hong Kong, Brunei and Church Crookham until 1 July 1994. At that point, while in Hong Kong, the 1st Battalion was amalgamated with the 1st Battalion, 2nd King Edward VII's Own Gurkha Rifles (The Sirmoor Rifles) to form the 1st Battalion, Royal Gurkha Rifles.

== Lineage ==
1817–1823: The Cuttack Legion
1823–1823: Rungpore Local Battalion (January–March)
1823–1823: Rungpore Light Infantry (March–May)
1823–1826: 10th Rungpore Light Infantry
1826–1827: 8th Rungapore Light Infantry
1827–1844: 8th Assam Light Infantry
1844–1850: 8th/1st Light Infantry Battalion
1850–1861: 1st Assam Light Infantry Battalion
1861–1861: 46th Regiment of Bengal Native (Light) Infantry
1861–1865: 42nd Regiment of Bengal Native (Light) Infantry
1865–1885: 42nd (Assam) Regiment of Bengal Native (Light) Infantry
1885–1886: 42nd (Assam) Regiment of Bengal (Light) Infantry
1886–1889: 42nd Regiment Gurkha Light Infantry
1889–1891: 42nd (Gurkha) Regiment of Bengal Light Infantry
1891–1901: 42nd Gurkha (Rifle) Regiment of Bengal Light Infantry
1901–1903: 42nd Gurkha Rifles
1903–1959: 6th Gurkha Rifles
1959–1994: 6th Queen Elizabeth's Own Gurkha Rifles.

== Victoria Cross recipients ==
There have been two Victoria Cross recipients from the 6th Gurkhas. These were:

- Lieutenant (acting Captain) Michael Allmand, 6th Duke of Connaught's Own Lancers (Watson's Horse) attached to the 3rd Battalion, 6th Gurkha Rifles, 23 June 1944, Burma (posthumous); and
- Rifleman Tulbahadur Pun, 3rd Battalion, 23 June 1944, Burma.

== Battle honours ==
The 6th Gurkhas received the following battle honours:

- Burma 1885–87.
- The Great War: Helles, Krithia, Suvla, Sari Bair, Gallipoli 1915, Suez Canal, Egypt 1915–16, Khan Baghdadi, Mesopotamia 1916–18, Persia 1916–1918, North West Frontier India 1915–17.
- Afghanistan 1919.
- The Second World War: Coriano, Sant Angelo, Monte Chicco, Lamone Crossing, Gaiana Crossing, Italy 1944–45, Burma 1942–45, Shwebo, Kyaukmyaung Bridgehead, Mandalay, Rangoon Road 1945, Chindits 1944.

== Regimental Colonels ==
Colonels of the Regiment were:

6th Gurkha Rifles

- 1926–1951: F.M. Sir William Riddell (Birdwood), 1st Lord Birdwood, GCB, GCSI, GCMG, GCVO, CIE, DSO
- 1951–1961: Gen. Sir John Harding, GCB, CBE, DSO, MC, ADC (Field Marshal from 1953)

6th Queen Elizabeth's Own Gurkha Rifles (1959)

- 1961–1969: Maj-Gen. James Alexander Rowland Robertson, GB, CBE, DSO
- 1969–1974: Maj-Gen. Arthur Gordon Patterson, CB, DSO, OBE, MC
- 1974–1978: Brig. David Leonard Powell-Jones, DSO, OBE
- 1978–1983: Col. (Hon. Brig.) Sir Noel Edward Vivian Short, Kt, MBE, MC
- 1983–1988: Lt-Gen. Sir Derek Boorman, KCB (also Staffordshire Regiment)
- 1988–1994: Maj-Gen. Raymond Austin Pett, MBE

*1994 Regiment amalgamated to form The Royal Gurkha Rifles

== Uniforms ==
The unique status of the unit until 1886 as the only Gurkha Light Infantry Regiment was reflected in its distinctive red coats. All other Gurkha regiments wore dark green uniforms and were designated as rifles. A suggestion by the then Viceroy Lord Dufferin that the regiment change from light infantry to rifles was declined after long discussion on the grounds that recruits sought service in the distinctive Lai kurti paltan (red coat regiment) where they were sworn in on regimental colours (not carried by rifle regiments). While standardisation eventually converted the 1st Gurkha Light infantry to the 6th Gurkha Rifles the historic red was commemorated in the red toories on the rifle green Kilmarnock caps.

== See also ==
- John Lucas (MC)
