= 2026 United States House of Representatives elections in Minnesota =

- November 3, 2026

All 8 Minnesota seats to the United States House of Representatives
	Majority party	Minority party
Party	Democratic (DFL)	Republican
Last election	4	4
Seats before	4	4
Seats won	5	3
Seat change	▲1	▼1
Popular vote	1,574,159	1,205,200
Percentage	56.07%	42.93%
Swing	▲5.87%	▼6.34%

Democratic hold Democratic gain
Republican hold
Democratic
40–50%
50–60%
60–70%
70–80%
Republican
50–60%
60–70%
70–80%

The 2026 United States House of Representatives elections in Minnesota were held on November 3, 2026, to elect the 8 U.S. representatives from the state of Minnesota, one from each of the state's congressional districts. The elections coincided with other elections to the House of Representatives, elections to the United States Senate, and various state and local elections. Primary elections were held August 11, 2026. This was the first time Democrats won a majority of U.S. House seats in Minnesota since 2018.

== Statewide polling ==
=== Statewide congressional polls ===
Poll source	Date(s) administered	Sample size (Note: Key: A – all adults RV – registered voters LV – likely voters V – unclear)	Margin of error	DFL	Republican	Other	Undecided
The New York Times/Siena University	October 19–26, 2026	752 (LV)	± 4.1%	55%	38%	<0.5% (Note: "The third-party candidate" with <0.5%)	6%
Big Data Poll	September 29–30, 2026	622 (LV)	± 4.0%	47%	37%	4% (Note: "Someone else/third party" with 4%)	12%
Big Data Poll	September 29–30, 2026	622 (LV)	± 4.0%	50% (Note: With voters who lean towards a given candidate)	40%	10%	

== District 1 ==
2026 Minnesota's 1st congressional district election

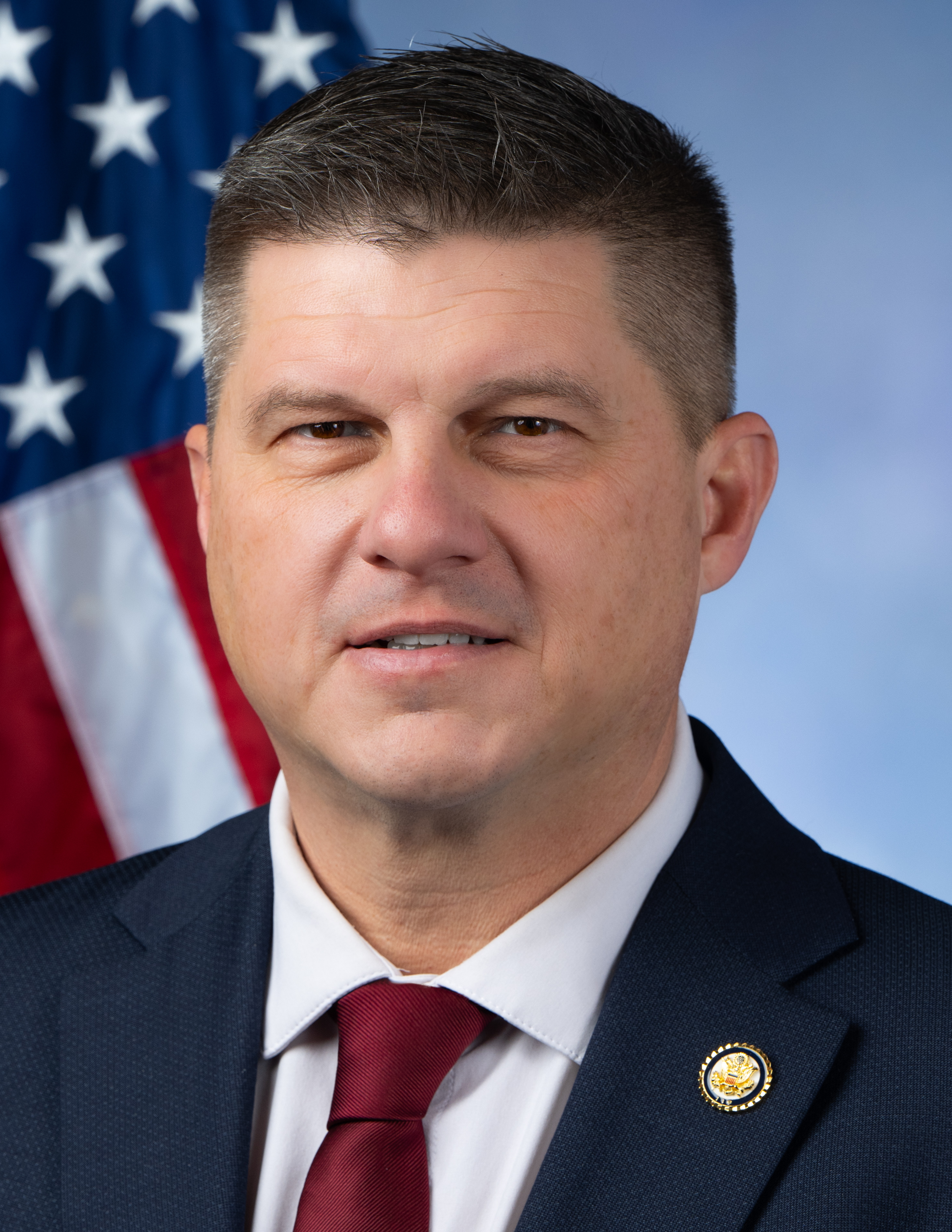
Nominee	Jake Johnson	Brad Finstad
Party	Democratic (DFL)	Republican
Popular vote	163,061	162,740
Percentage	50.0%	49.9%
- Johnson: 50–60% 60–70% Finstad: 50–60% 60–70%
U.S. Representative before election
Brad Finstad
Republican
Elected U.S. Representative
Jake Johnson
Democratic (DFL)

The 1st district stretches across southern Minnesota from its borders with South Dakota to Wisconsin, and includes the cities of Rochester, Mankato, Winona, Austin, Owatonna, Albert Lea, New Ulm, and Worthington. The incumbent is Republican Brad Finstad, who was re-elected with 58.5% of the vote in 2024. Democrats have not won this seat in an election since 2016.

=== Republican primary ===
==== Nominee ====
- Brad Finstad, incumbent U.S. representative

==== Eliminated in primary ====
- Greg Goetzman, candidate for this district in 2024
- Oliver Morlan, small business owner

==== Endorsements ====
Brad Finstad

Executive branch officials

- Donald Trump, president of the United States (2017–2021, 2025–present)

Organizations

- AIPAC

Political parties

- Republican Party of Minnesota

==== Fundraising ====
Campaign finance reports as of July 22, 2026
Candidate	Raised	Spent	Cash on hand
Brad Finstad (R)	$2,030,569	$808,055	$1,283,923
Source: Federal Election Commission

==== Results ====
Primary results by county: Finstad: 80–90%; 90–100%

Primary results by precinct: Finstad: 50–60%; 60–70%; 70–80%; 80–90%; 90–100%; Goetzman: 90–100%; Morlan: 60–70%; 90–100%; Tie: 30–40%; No Votes Cast

Republican primary results
Party	Candidate	Votes	%
Republican	Brad Finstad (incumbent)	50,523	90.1
Republican	Greg Goetzman	2,907	5.2
Republican	Oliver Morlan	2,624	4.7
Total votes		56,054	100.0

=== Democratic-Farmer-Labor primary ===
==== Nominee ====
- Jake Johnson, high school teacher

==== Eliminated in primary ====
- Alex Eaton, real-estate company owner

==== Declined ====
- Andy Smith, state representative from district 25B (2023–present) (endorsed Johnson)

==== Endorsements ====
Jake Johnson

Executive branch officials

- Pete Buttigieg, former U.S. secretary of transportation (2021–2025)

U.S. senators

- Tina Smith, Minnesota (2018–present)

U.S. representatives

- Chris Deluzio, PA-17 (2023–present)
- Pat Ryan, NY-18 (2022–present)
- Greg Stanton, AZ-04 (2019–present)

Statewide officials

- Arne Carlson, former governor of Minnesota (1991–1999) (Republican)
- Tim Walz, governor of Minnesota (2019–present) and former U.S. representative from MN-01 (2007–2019)

Labor unions

- American Federation of State, County and Municipal Employees
- Education Minnesota
- Minnesota Association of Professional Employees
- National Education Association
- Service Employees International Union Minnesota State Council
- Minnesota AFL-CIO

Organizations

- 314 Action
- Clean Water Action
- DCCC Red to Blue
- End Citizens United
- League of Conservation Voters
- Minnesota Young DFL
- Minnesota 50501
- NewDem Action Fund
- NRDC Action Fund
- Planned Parenthood Action Fund
- Reproductive Freedom for All

Political parties

- Minnesota Democratic–Farmer–Labor Party

==== Fundraising ====
Campaign finance reports as of July 22, 2026
Candidate	Raised	Spent	Cash on hand
Jake Johnson (DFL)	$2,000,547	$988,953	$1,011,593
Source: Federal Election Commission

==== Results ====
Primary results by county: Johnson: 70–80%; 80–90%

Primary results by precinct: Johnson: 50–60%; 60–70%; 70–80%; 80–90%; 90–100%; Eaton: 50–60%; 60–70%; 70–80%; 90–100%; 50% Tie No Votes Cast

Democratic (DFL) primary results
Party	Candidate	Votes	%
Democratic (DFL)	Jake Johnson	47,255	81.7
Democratic (DFL)	Alex Eaton	10,616	18.3
Total votes		57,871	100.0

=== General election ===
==== Predictions ====
Source	Ranking	As of
The Cook Political Report	Lean R	October 16, 2026
Decision Desk HQ	Lean R	October 20, 2026
Inside Elections	Lean R	October 29, 2026
Sabato's Crystal Ball	Lean R	October 20, 2026

==== Post-primary endorsements ====
Brad Finstad (R)

Executive branch officials

- Donald Trump, president of the United States (2017–2021, 2025–present)

Labor unions

- International Union of Operating Engineers Local 49
- Minnesota Pipe Trades Local 6

Organizations

- National Federation of Independent Business
- U.S. Chamber of Commerce
Jake Johnson (DFL)

Executive branch officials

- Pete Buttigieg, former U.S. secretary of transportation (2021–present)

U.S. senators

- Amy Klobuchar, Minnesota (2007–present)
- Tina Smith, Minnesota (2018–present)

U.S. representatives

- Suzan Delbene, WA-01 (2012–present)
- Chris Deluzio, PA-17 (2023–present)
- Adam Gray, CA-13 (2025–present)
- Greg Stanton, AZ-04 (2019–present)

Statewide officials

- Arne Carlson, former governor of Minnesota (1991–1999) (Republican)

Individuals

- Gerald Woodley, Brad Finstad's former campaign chair (Republican)

Labor unions

- United Steelworkers District 11
- United Auto Workers

Organizations

- Blue Dog PAC
- J Street

==== Fundraising ====
Campaign finance reports as of October 14, 2026
Candidate	Raised	Spent	Cash on hand
Brad Finstad (R)	$2,765,870	$2,223,657	$603,622
Jake Johnson (DFL)	$3,507,568	$2,946,475	$561,094
Source: Federal Election Commission

==== Polling ====
Poll source	Date(s) administered	Sample size	Margin of error	Brad Finstad (R)	Jake Johnson (DFL)	Undecided
Public Policy Polling (D) (Note: Poll sponsored by House Majority PAC, which is focused on electing Democrats to the U.S. House of Representatives)	October 13–14, 2026	588 (LV)	–	43%	43%	14%
SurveyUSA (Note: Poll sponsored by KAAL)	October 4–9, 2026	565 (LV)	± 4.6%	44%	46%	10%
GBAO (D)	September 18–21, 2026	500 (LV)	—	46%	47%	7%
Ragnar Research Partners (R) (Note: Poll commissioned by Conservatives For America, an organization linked to the Republican Study Committee)	March 12–14, 2026	400 (LV)	± 5.0%	52%	42%	6%
Public Policy Polling (D) (Note: Poll sponsored by Johnson's campaign)	February 2–3, 2026	708 (RV)	± 3.7%	44%	41%	15%

Hypothetical polling

Generic Republican vs. generic Democrat

Poll source	Date(s) administered	Sample size	Margin of error	Generic Republican	Generic Democrat	Undecided
Ragnar Research Partners (R)	March 12–14, 2026	400 (LV)	± 5.0%	45%	40%	15%

==== Results ====
2026 Minnesota's 1st congressional district election
Party	Candidate	Votes	%
Democratic (DFL)	Jake Johnson	163,055	50.0
Republican	Brad Finstad (incumbent)	162,733	49.9
Write-in		391	0.1
Total votes		326,180	100.0
Democratic (DFL) gain from Republican			

== District 2 ==
2026 Minnesota's 2nd congressional district election
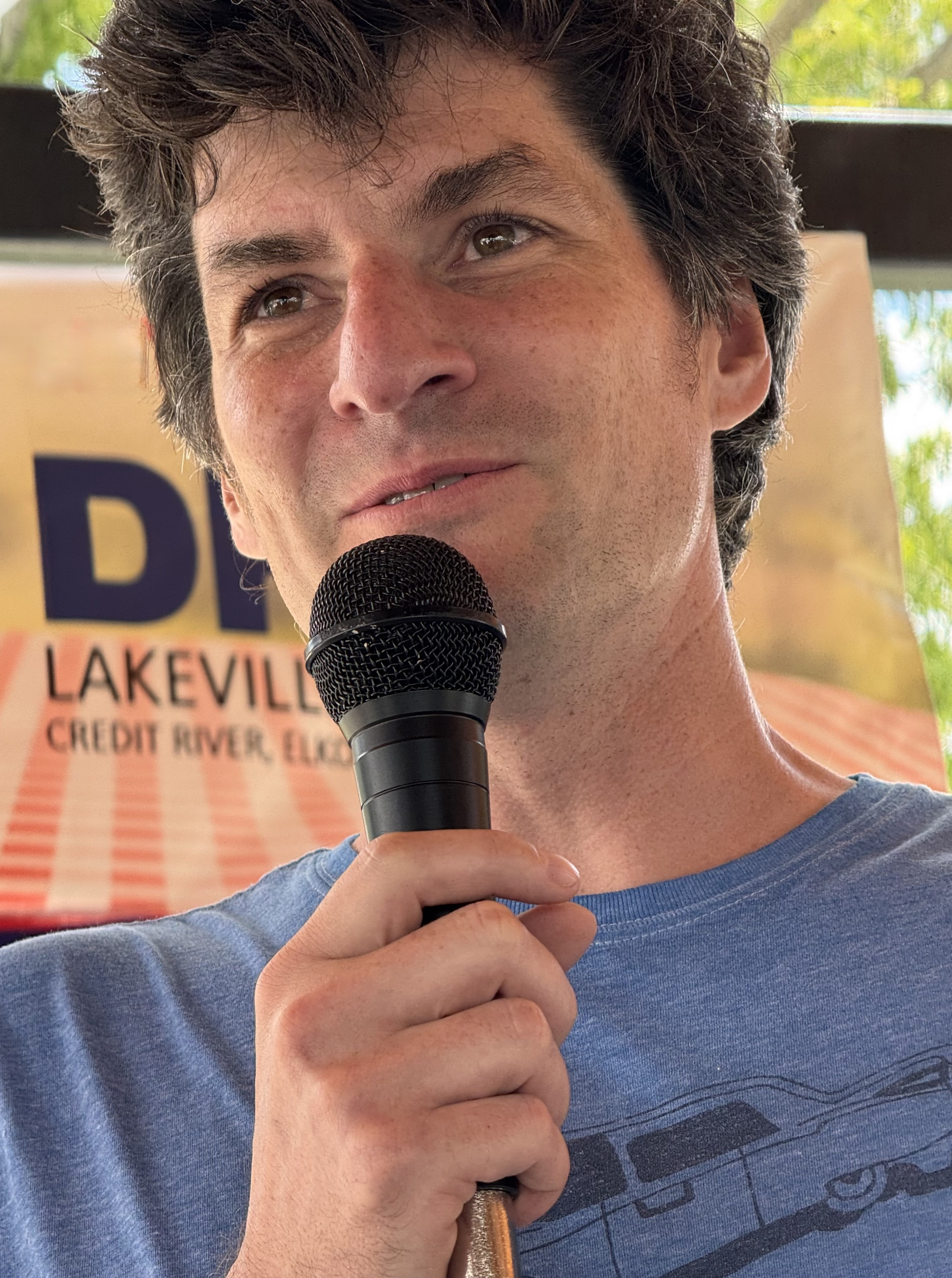

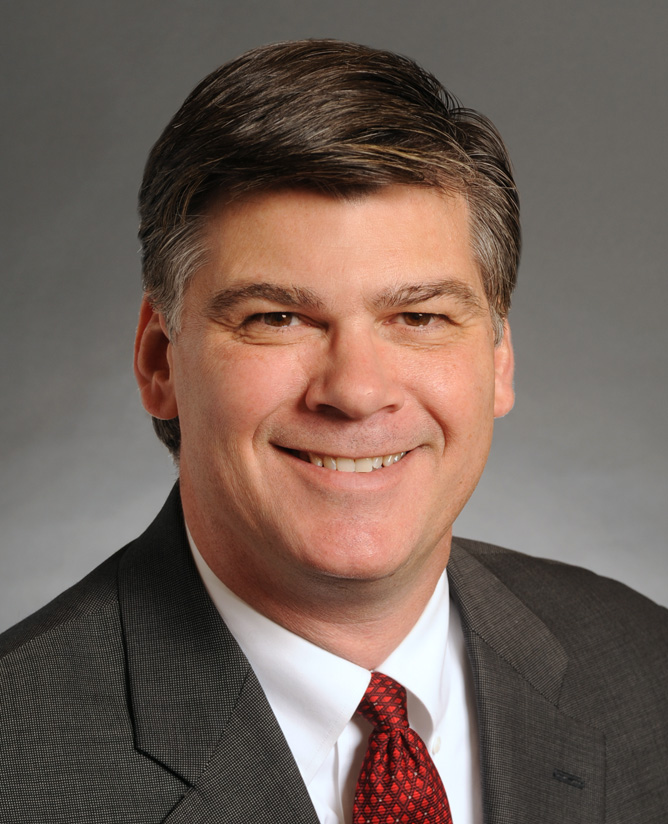
Nominee	Matt Little	Eric Pratt
Party	Democratic (DFL)	Republican
Popular vote	214,255	160,636
Percentage	57.1%	42.8%
- Little: 50–60% 60–70% Pratt: 50–60% 60–70%
U.S. Representative before election
Angie Craig
Democratic (DFL)
Elected U.S. Representative
Matt Little
Democratic (DFL)

The 2nd district is based in the southern Twin Cities suburbs, including Burnsville, Eagan, and Lakeville. The incumbent is Democrat Angie Craig, who was re-elected with 55.5% of the vote in 2024. Craig retired to run for U.S. Senate in 2026, losing to Lieutenant Governor Peggy Flanagan in the August 11, 2026, DFL primary election.

=== Democratic-Farmer-Labor primary ===
==== Nominee ====
- Matt Little, former state senator from the 58th district (2017–2021)

==== Eliminated in primary ====
- Abdisallam Abdulle, educator
- Kaela Berg, state representative from district 55B (2021–present)
- Matt Klein, state senator from the 53rd district (2017–present)
- Hugh McTavish, Independence nominee for governor in 2022
- Christopher Mosel

==== Declined ====
- Angie Craig, incumbent U.S. representative (ran for U.S. Senate)
- Mike Norton, former vice chair of the Minneapolis DFL and candidate for Minneapolis City Council in 2021
- Erin Maye Quade, state senator from the 56th district (2023–present) and candidate for lieutenant governor in 2018 (endorsed Little)

==== Endorsements ====
Kaela Berg

U.S. representatives

- Chris Deluzio, PA-17 (2023–present)
- Lois Frankel, FL-22 (2013–present)

State legislators

- Lindsey Port, state senator from the 55th district (2021–present)
- 21 state representatives (Note: Esther Agbaje, state representative from district 59B (2021–present); Kristin Bahner, state representative from district 37B (2019–present); Nathan Coulter, state representative from district 51B (2023–present); Brion Curran, state representative from district 36B (2023–present); Sandra Feist, state representative from district 39B (2021–present); Cedrick Frazier, state representative from district 43A (2021–present); Luke Frederick, state representative from district 18B (2021–present); David Gottfried, state representative from district 40B (2025–present); Julie Greene, state representative from district 50A (2025–present); Jess Hanson, state representative from district 55A (2023–present); Josiah Hill, state representative from district 33B (2023–present); Athena Hollins, former majority whip of the Minnesota House of Representatives (2023–2025) from district 66B (2021–present); Huldah Hiltsley, state representative from district 38A (2025–present); Heather Keeler, state representative from district 4A (2021–present); Ginny Klevorn, state representative from district 42B (2019–present); Carlie Kotyza-Witthuhn, state representative from district 49B (2019–present); Tina Liebling, state representative from district 24B (2005–present); Leon Lillie, state representative from district 44B (2005–present); Jamie Long, former majority leader of the Minnesota House of Representatives (2023–2025) from district 61B (2019–present); Mohamud Noor, state representative from district 60B (2023–present); Liz Reyer, state representative from district 52A (2021–present))

Labor unions

- Association of Flight Attendants
- Communications Workers of America Minnesota State Council
- United Steelworkers

Local officials

- Kaohly Her, mayor of St. Paul (2026–present)

Organizations

- Elect Democratic Women
- EMILYs List
- End Citizens United
- Our Revolution
- Showing Up for Racial Justice
- Stonewall DFL
Matt Klein

State legislators

- John Hoffman, state senator from the 34th district (2013–present)

Labor unions

- International Association of Bridge, Structural, Ornamental and Reinforcing Iron Workers Local 512
- Minnesota Pipe Trades Association

Organizations

- 314 Action
- Democratic Majority For Israel
Matt Little

U.S. representatives

- Greg Casar, TX-35 (2023–present)
- Maxwell Frost, FL-10 (2023–present)
- Pramila Jayapal, WA-07 (2017–present)
- Betty McCollum, MN-04 (2001–present)

Statewide officials

- Julie Blaha, state auditor of Minnesota (2019–present)
- Keith Ellison, attorney general of Minnesota (2019–present)

State legislators

- Erin Maye Quade, state senator from the 56th district (2023–present)

Labor unions

- Minnesota Association of Professional Employees
- National Nurses United
- Minnesota Postal Workers Union

Organizations

- American Priorities
- A New Policy PAC
- Clean Water Action
- Congressional Progressive Caucus
- Leaders We Deserve
- Minnesota Young DFL
- Minnesota 50501
- MoveOn

Political parties

- Minnesota Democratic-Farmer-Labor Party
Declined to endorse

U.S. representatives

- Angie Craig, MN-02 (2019–present)

==== Fundraising ====
Italics indicate a withdrawn candidate.

Campaign finance reports as of July 22, 2026
Candidate	Raised	Spent	Cash on hand
Kaela Berg (DFL)	$390,965	$343,173	$47,792
Matt Klein (DFL)	$1,215,285	$926,534	$288,752
Matt Little (DFL)	$923,277	$796,236	$127,543
Hugh McTavish (DFL)	$188,258	$180,979	$7,279
Michael Stefanko (DFL)	$935	$935	$0
Source: Federal Election Commission

==== Polling ====
Poll source	Date(s) administered	Sample size	Margin of error	Kaela Berg	Matt Klein	Matt Little	Undecided
GQR (D) (Note: Poll sponsored by Klein's campaign)	May 27 – June 1, 2026	403 (LV)	± 4.9%	16%	19%	26%	39%
Impact Research (D) (Note: Poll sponsored by Little's campaign)	May 18–20, 2026	400 (LV)	–	13%	11%	41%	35%

==== Debate ====
2026 Minnesota's 2nd congressional district Democratic-Farmer-Labor primary debate
No.	Date	Host	Moderator	Link	Democratic–Farmer–Labor	Democratic–Farmer–Labor	Democratic–Farmer–Labor
Key: P Participant A Absent N Not invited I Invited W Withdrawn							
Key: P Participant A Absent N Not invited I Invited W Withdrawn					Kaela Berg	Matt Klein	Matt Little
1	Jan. 20, 2026	Carleton College Democrats; Minnesota Democratic–Farmer–Labor Party	Greg Marfleet	YouTube	P	P	P

==== Results ====
Results by county Little: 30–40%; 40–50%; 50–60%; Klein: 30–40%

Results by precinct Little: 30–40%; 40–50%; 50–60%; 60–70%; 70–80%; 90–100%; Klein: 30–40%; 40–50%; 50–60%; 60–70%; 70–80%; Berg: 30–40%; 50–60%; Tie: 30–40%

Democratic (DFL) primary results
Party	Candidate	Votes	%
Democratic (DFL)	Matt Little	41,792	47.2
Democratic (DFL)	Matt Klein	26,898	30.4
Democratic (DFL)	Kaela Berg	14,743	16.7
Democratic (DFL)	Abdisallam Abdulle	2,323	2.6
Democratic (DFL)	Hugh McTavish	2,292	2.6
Democratic (DFL)	Christopher Mosel	444	0.5
Total votes		88,492	100.0

=== Republican primary ===
==== Nominee ====
- Eric Pratt, state senator from the 54th district (2013–present)

==== Withdrawn ====
- Tyler Kistner, U.S. Marine Corps Reserve officer and nominee for this district in 2020 and 2022
- Jeremy Westby, small-business owner (previously ran in the 3rd district; endorsed Pratt)

==== Declined ====
- Zach Duckworth, state senator from the 57th district (2021–present) (running for re-election)
- Joe Teirab, former federal prosecutor and nominee for this district in 2024

==== Endorsements ====
Eric Pratt

U.S. representatives

- John Kline, former MN-02 (2003–2017)

Individuals

- Jeremy Westby, small-business owner and former candidate for this seat

Political parties

- Republican Party of Minnesota

==== Fundraising ====
Italics indicate a withdrawn candidate.

Campaign finance reports as of March 31, 2026
Candidate	Raised	Spent	Cash on hand
Tyler Kistner (R)	$415,618	$388,096	$27,522
Eric Pratt (R)	$259,426	$119,734	$139,691
Source: Federal Election Commission

==== Results ====
Republican primary results
Party	Candidate	Votes	%
Republican	Eric Pratt	43,813	100.0
Total votes		43,813	100.0

=== General election ===
==== Predictions ====
Source	Ranking	As of
Decision Desk HQ	Safe D	October 1, 2026
The Cook Political Report	Likely D	April 30, 2025
Inside Elections	Likely D	December 5, 2025
Sabato's Crystal Ball	Likely D	March 26, 2026

==== Post-primary endorsements ====
Matt Little (D)

Labor unions

- American Federation of Government Employees
- Education Minnesota
- United Auto Workers

Organizations

- End Citizens United
- Jane Fonda Climate PAC
- Our Revolution
Eric Pratt (R)

Organizations

- National Federation of Independent Business

==== Fundraising ====
Campaign finance reports as of October 14, 2026
Candidate	Raised	Spent	Cash on hand
Matt Little (DFL)	$1,494,554	$1,289,779	$205,276
Eric Pratt (R)	$768,791	$595,361	$173,430
Source: Federal Election Commission

==== Polling ====
Poll source	Date(s) administered	Sample size	Margin of error	Matt Little (DFL)	Eric Pratt (R)	Undecided
Impact Research (D)	September 9–13, 2026	500 (LV)	± 4.4%	52%	40%	8%
Harper Polling (R) (Note: Poll sponsored by Pratt's campaign)	June 18–21, 2026	415 (LV)	± 4.8%	45%	40%	15%

Hypothetical polling

Kaela Berg vs. Eric Pratt

Poll source	Date(s) administered	Sample size	Margin of error	Kaela Berg (D)	Eric Pratt (R)	Undecided
Harper Polling (R)	June 18–21, 2026	415 (LV)	± 4.8%	43%	43%	14%

Matt Klein vs. Eric Pratt

Poll source	Date(s) administered	Sample size	Margin of error	Matt Klein (D)	Eric Pratt (R)	Undecided
Harper Polling (R)	June 18–21, 2026	415 (LV)	± 4.8%	43%	42%	15%

==== Results ====
2026 Minnesota's 2nd congressional district election
Party	Candidate	Votes	%
Democratic (DFL)	Matt Little	214,255	57.1
Republican	Eric Pratt	160,636	42.8
Write-in		335	0.1
Total votes		375,226	100.0
Democratic (DFL) hold			

== District 3 ==
2026 Minnesota's 3rd congressional district election
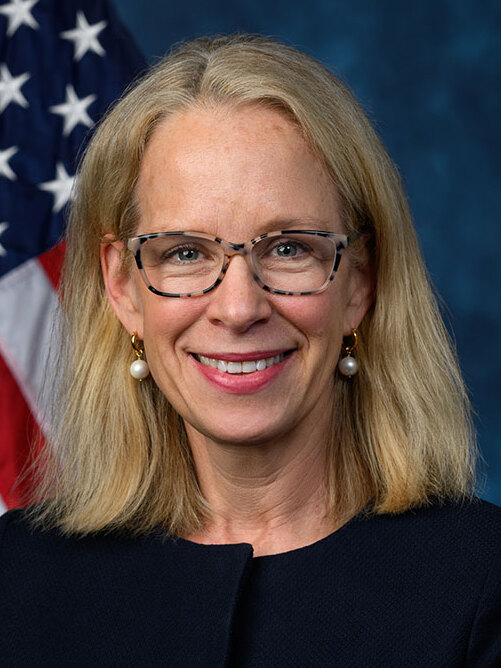

Nominee	Kelly Morrison	Tyler Bass
Party	Democratic (DFL)	Republican
Popular vote	242,079	135,505
Percentage	64.0%	35.8%
- Morrison: 50–60% 60–70%
U.S. Representative before election
Kelly Morrison
Democratic (DFL)
Elected U.S. Representative
Kelly Morrison
Democratic (DFL)

The 3rd district encompasses the western suburbs of the Twin Cities, including Brooklyn Park, Coon Rapids to the northeast, Bloomington to the south, and Eden Prairie, Edina, Maple Grove, Plymouth, Minnetonka, and Wayzata to the west. The incumbent is Democrat Kelly Morrison, who was elected with 58.4% of the vote in 2024. Republicans have not won an election for this seat since 2016.

=== Democratic-Farmer-Labor primary ===
==== Nominee ====
- Kelly Morrison, incumbent U.S. representative

==== Endorsements ====
Kelly Morrison

Labor unions

- American Federation of Government Employees
- Education Minnesota
- Minnesota AFL-CIO

Organizations

- End Citizens United
- Jewish Democratic Council of America
- League of Conservation Voters
- Planned Parenthood Action Fund
- Reproductive Freedom for All

Political parties

- Minnesota Democratic–Farmer–Labor Party

==== Fundraising ====
Campaign finance reports as of March 31, 2026
Candidate	Raised	Spent	Cash on hand
Kelly Morrison (DFL)	$777,312	$575,556	$227,144
Source: Federal Election Commission

==== Results ====
Democratic (DFL) primary results
Party	Candidate	Votes	%
Democratic (DFL)	Kelly Morrison (incumbent)	86,217	100.0
Total votes		86,217	100.0

=== Republican primary ===
==== Nominee ====
- Tyler Bass, small business owner

==== Eliminated in primary ====
- Quentin Wittrock, retired attorney

==== Withdrawn ====
- Jeremy Westby, small-business owner (dropped to run in the 2nd district)

==== Endorsements ====
Quentin Wittrock

Political parties

- Republican Party of Minnesota

==== Fundraising ====
Italics indicate a withdrawn candidate.

Campaign finance reports as of March 31, 2026
Candidate	Raised	Spent	Cash on hand
Jeremy Westby (R)	$30,554	$580	$29,973
Source: Federal Election Commission

==== Results ====
Primary results by county: Bass: 50–60%

Primary results by precinct: Bass: 50–60%; 60–70%; 70–80%; Wittrock: 50–60%; 60–70%; Tie: 50%; No Votes Cast

Republican primary results
Party	Candidate	Votes	%
Republican	Tyler Bass	22,589	55.4
Republican	Quentin Wittrock	18,165	44.6
Total votes		40,754	100.0

=== General election ===
==== Predictions ====
Source	Ranking	As of
Decision Desk HQ	Safe D	July 14, 2026
The Cook Political Report	Solid D	February 6, 2025
Inside Elections	Solid D	March 7, 2025
Sabato's Crystal Ball	Safe D	July 15, 2025

==== Results ====
2026 Minnesota's 3rd congressional district election
Party	Candidate	Votes	%
Democratic (DFL)	Kelly Morrison (incumbent)	242,079	64.0
Republican	Tyler Bass	135,505	35.8
Write-in		413	0.1
Total votes		377,997	100.0
Democratic (DFL) hold			

== District 4 ==
2026 Minnesota's 4th congressional district election
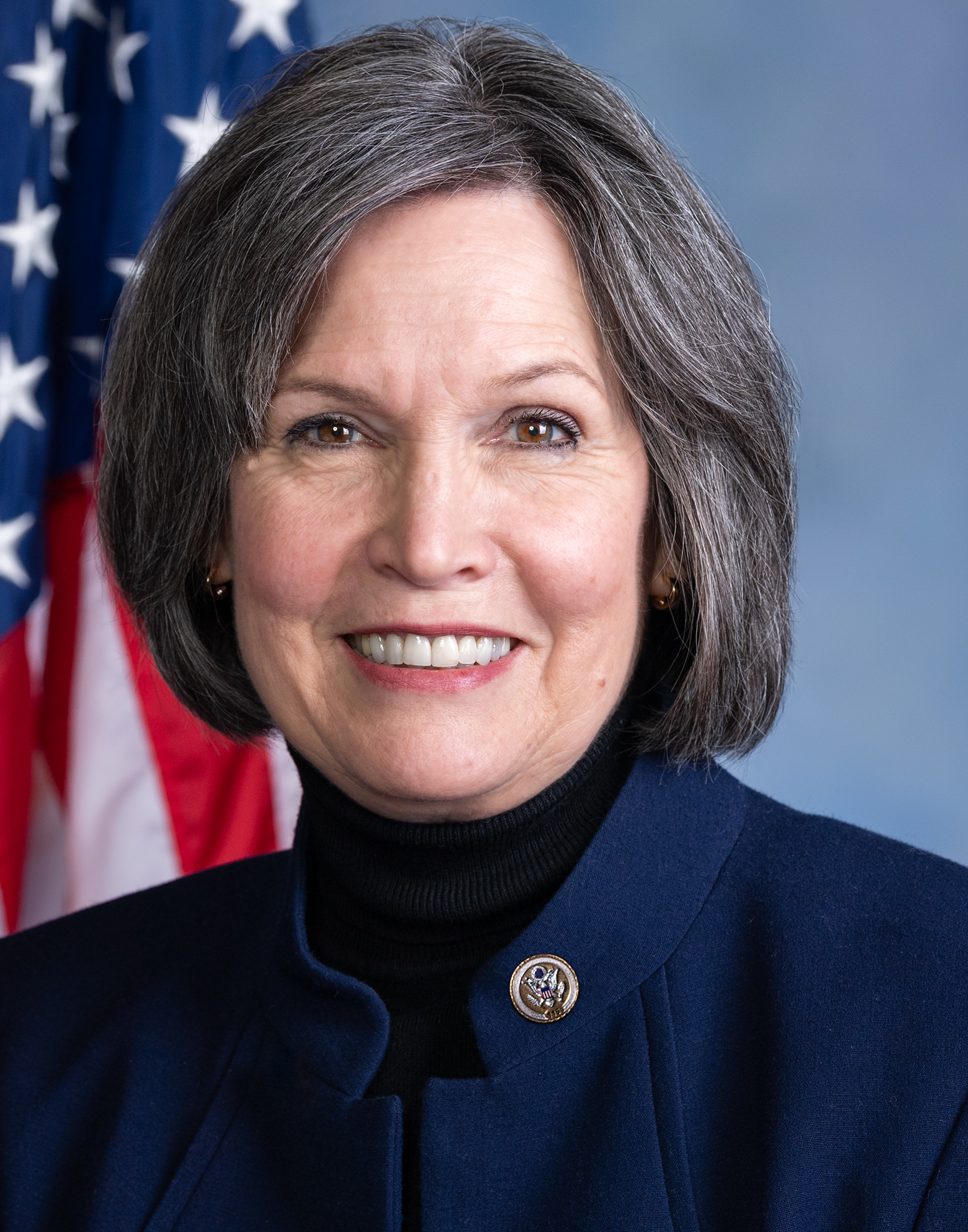

Nominee	Betty McCollum	Paul Wikstrom
Party	Democratic (DFL)	Republican
Popular vote	245,699	90,068
Percentage	73.1%	26.8%
- McCollum: 60–70% 70–80%
U.S. Representative before election
Betty McCollum
Democratic (DFL)
Elected U.S. Representative
Betty McCollum
Democratic (DFL)

The 4th district encompasses the Saint Paul half of the Twin Cities metro area, including Ramsey County and parts of Washington County. The incumbent is Democrat Betty McCollum, who was reelected with 67.6% of the vote in 2024.

=== Democratic-Farmer-Labor primary ===
==== Nominee ====
- Betty McCollum, incumbent U.S. representative

==== Eliminated in primary ====
- Aswar Rahman, humanitarian and candidate for mayor of Minneapolis in 2017

==== Endorsements ====
Betty McCollum

Labor unions

- American Federation of Government Employees
- Education Minnesota
- Minnesota AFL-CIO

Organizations

- Center for Freethought Equality
- Clean Water Action
- J Street
- League of Conservation Voters
- Minnesota Young DFL
- National Women's Political Caucus
- Planned Parenthood Action Fund
- Population Connection
- Sierra Club

Political parties

- Minnesota Democratic–Farmer–Labor Party

==== Fundraising ====
Campaign finance reports as of March 31, 2026
Candidate	Raised	Spent	Cash on hand
Betty McCollum (DFL)	$1,044,714	$930,092	$669,540
Source: Federal Election Commission

==== Results ====
Primary results by county: McCollum: 80–90%

Primary results by precinct: McCollum: 50–60%; 60–70%; 70–80%; 80–90%; 90–100%; No Votes Cast

Democratic (DFL) primary results
Party	Candidate	Votes	%
Democratic (DFL)	Betty McCollum (incumbent)	95,811	85.8
Democratic (DFL)	Aswar Rahman	15,869	14.2
Total votes		111,680	100.0

=== Republican primary ===
==== Nominee ====
- Paul Wikstrom, engineer and nominee for Minnesota House of Representatives District 40B in 2024

==== Eliminated in primary ====
- Gene Rechtzigel, farmer
- Paul Xiong, former law enforcement officer

==== Endorsements ====
Paul Wikstrom

Political parties

- Republican Party of Minnesota

==== Fundraising ====
Campaign finance reports as of June 30, 2026
Candidate	Raised	Spent	Cash on hand
Paul Xiong (R)	$36,317	$32,631	$3,687
Source: Federal Election Commission

==== Results ====
Primary results by county: Wikstrom: 70–80%

Primary results by precinct: Wikstrom: 30–40%; 40–50%; 50–60%; 60–70%; 70–80%; 80–90%; 90–100%; Xiong: 40–50%; 50–60%; 60–70%; Rechtzigel: 90–100%; Tie: 40–50%; No Votes Cast

Republican primary results
Party	Candidate	Votes	%
Republican	Paul Wikstrom	20,628	72.6
Republican	Paul Xiong	4,788	16.9
Republican	Gene Rechtzigel	2,988	10.5
Total votes		28,404	100.0

=== General election ===
==== Predictions ====
Source	Ranking	As of
Decision Desk HQ	Safe D	July 14, 2026
The Cook Political Report	Safe D	February 6, 2025
Inside Elections	Safe D	March 7, 2025
Sabato's Crystal Ball	Safe D	July 15, 2025

==== Post-primary endorsements ====
Betty McCollum (D)

Labor unions

- United Auto Workers

==== Results ====
2026 Minnesota's 4th congressional district election
Party	Candidate	Votes	%
Democratic (DFL)	Betty McCollum (incumbent)	245,699	73.1%
Republican	Paul Wikstrom	90,068	26.8%
Write-in		477	0.1
Total votes		336,274	100.0
Democratic (DFL) hold			

== District 5 ==
2026 Minnesota's 5th congressional district election
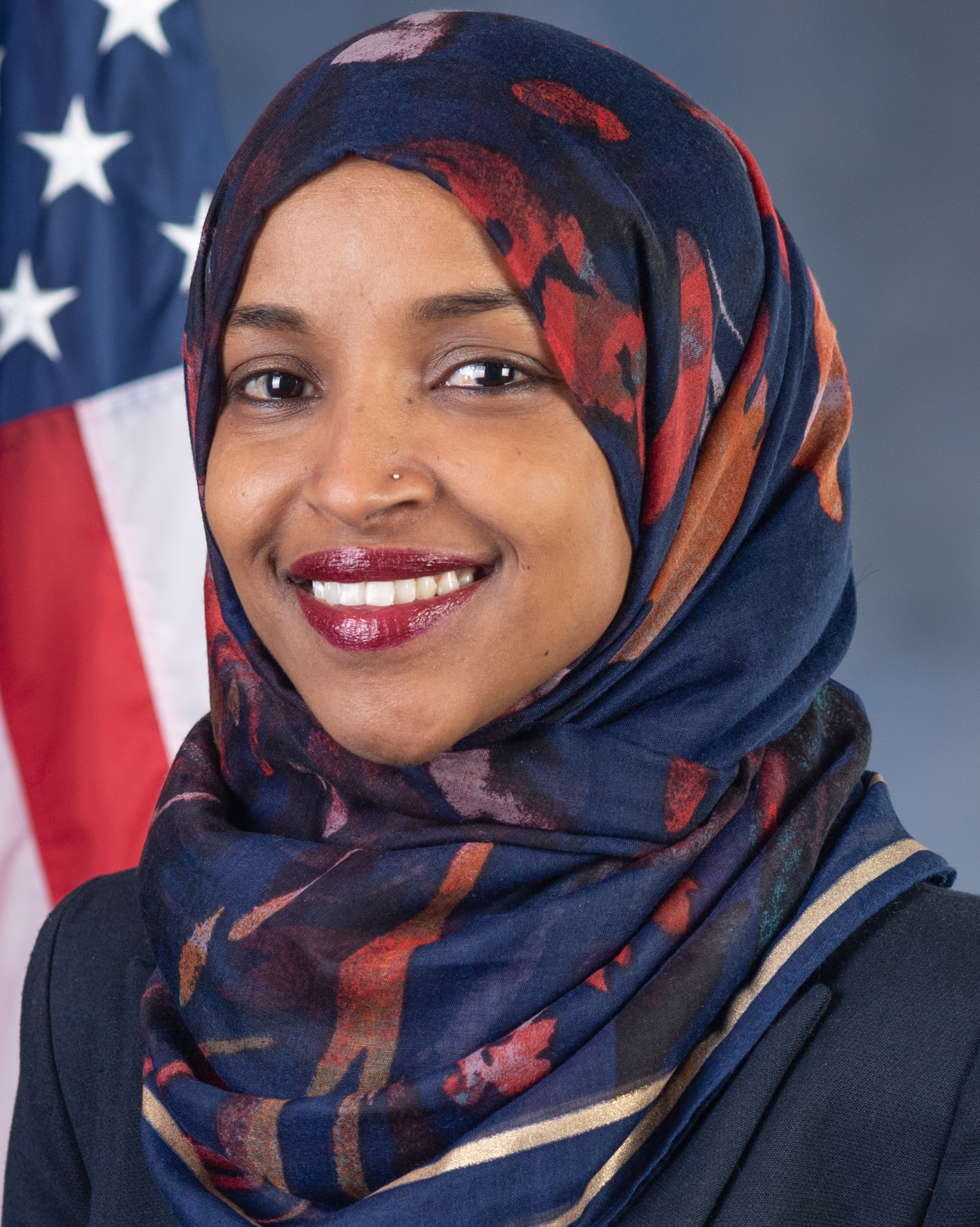

Nominee	Ilhan Omar	John Nagel	DeVelle Jackson
Party	Democratic (DFL)	Republican	Independent
Popular vote	263,166	55,805	24,215
Percentage	76.7%	16.3%	7.1%
- Omar: 40–50% 50–60% 60–70% 70–80% 80–90% >90%
U.S. Representative before election
Ilhan Omar
Democratic (DFL)
Elected U.S. Representative
Ilhan Omar
Democratic (DFL)

The 5th district encompasses eastern Hennepin County, including all of Minneapolis and the cities of St. Louis Park, Richfield, Crystal, Robbinsdale, Golden Valley, New Hope, and Fridley. The incumbent is Democrat Ilhan Omar, who was re-elected with 74.3% of the vote in 2024. Omar had expressed interest in running for U.S. Senate in 2026, but ultimately announced in April 2025 that she would run for re-election.

=== Democratic-Farmer-Labor primary ===
==== Nominee ====
- Ilhan Omar, incumbent U.S. representative

==== Eliminated in primary ====
- Julie Le, former ICE attorney
- Abena A. McKenzie, nurse
- Latonya Reeves, AFSCME Council 5 vice president and Democratic National Committee member
- Nate Schluter

==== Declined ====
- Don Samuels, former Minneapolis city council member and candidate for this district in 2022 and 2024
- Ryan Winkler, former majority leader of the Minnesota House of Representatives (2019–2023) from district 46A (2007–2015, 2019–2023), candidate for Minnesota attorney general in 2018, and candidate for Hennepin County Attorney in 2022

==== Endorsements ====
Ilhan Omar

U.S. senators

- Amy Klobuchar, Minnesota (2007–present)
- Tina Smith, Minnesota (2018–present)

Statewide officials

- Keith Ellison, attorney general of Minnesota (2019–present) and former U.S. representative from MN-05 (2007–2019)
- Tim Walz, governor of Minnesota (2019–present)

Labor unions

- American Federation of Government Employees
- Education Minnesota
- Minnesota Association of Professional Employees
- Minnesota AFL-CIO

Organizations

- End Citizens United
- Minnesota Young DFL
- Our Revolution
- National Women's Political Caucus
- PAL PAC
- Peace Action
- Planned Parenthood Action Fund
- Sierra Club
- Stonewall DFL
- Track AIPAC
- Minnesota 50501

Political parties

- Minnesota Democratic–Farmer–Labor Party

==== Fundraising ====
Campaign finance reports as of March 31, 2026
Candidate	Raised	Spent	Cash on hand
Ilhan Omar (DFL)	$5,090,947	$3,842,403	$1,572,764
Latonya Reeves (DFL)	$31,095	$29,931	$1,444
Source: Federal Election Commission

==== Results ====
Primary results by county: Omar: 70–80%; 80–90%

Primary results by precinct: Omar: 40–50%; 50–60%; 60–70%; 70–80%; 80–90%; 90–100%

Democratic (DFL) primary results
Party	Candidate	Votes	%
Democratic (DFL)	Ilhan Omar (incumbent)	122,640	80.7
Democratic (DFL)	Julie Le	10,201	6.7
Democratic (DFL)	Latonya Reeves	9,131	6.0
Democratic (DFL)	Nate Schluter	8,016	5.3
Democratic (DFL)	Abena McKenzie	1,961	1.3
Total votes		151,949	100.0

=== Republican primary ===
==== Nominee ====
- John Nagel, retired police officer and nominee for Minnesota House of Representatives District 46A in 2024

==== Eliminated in primary ====
- Dalia Al-Aqidi, retired journalist, nominee for this district in 2024, and candidate in 2020
- Angie Windhauser, businesswoman
- Abbey Zieska, businesswoman

==== Endorsements ====
Dalia Al-Aqidi

Political parties

- Republican Party of Minnesota

==== Fundraising ====
Campaign finance reports as of March 31, 2026
Candidate	Raised	Spent	Cash on hand
Dalia Al-Aqidi (R)	$965,736	$971,287	$33,367
John Nagel (R)	$388,296	$301,575	$86,720
Source: Federal Election Commission

==== Results ====
Primary results by county: Nagel: 50–60%

Primary results by precinct: Nagel: 30–40%; 40–50%; 50–60%; 60–70%; 70–80%; 80–90%; Al-Aqidi: 30–40%; 40–50%; 50–60%; 60–70%; Windhauser: 40–50%; 50–60%; 70–80%; Zieska: 90–100%; Tie: 30–40%

Republican primary results
Party	Candidate	Votes	%
Republican	John Nagel	7,777	52.2
Republican	Dalia Al-Aqidi	3,902	26.2
Republican	Angie Windhauser	2,315	15.5
Republican	Abbey Zieska	915	6.1
Total votes		14,909	100.0

=== Independents ===
==== Declared ====
- DeVelle Jackson

==== Write-in candidates ====
- Darryl Joel Robinson
- Angie Windhauser

=== General election ===
==== Predictions ====
Source	Ranking	As of
Decision Desk HQ	Safe D	July 14, 2026
The Cook Political Report	Safe D	February 6, 2025
Inside Elections	Safe D	March 7, 2025
Sabato's Crystal Ball	Safe D	July 15, 2025

==== Post-primary endorsements ====
Ilhan Omar (D)

Labor unions

- United Auto Workers

==== Results ====
2026 Minnesota's 5th congressional district election
Party	Candidate	Votes	%
Democratic (DFL)	Ilhan Omar (incumbent)	262,702	76.5%
Republican	Joe Nagel	55,765	16.2%
Independent	DeVelle L. Jackson	24,110	7.0%
Write-in		931	0.3
Total votes		343,508	100.0
Democratic (DFL) hold			

== District 6 ==
2026 Minnesota's 6th congressional district election
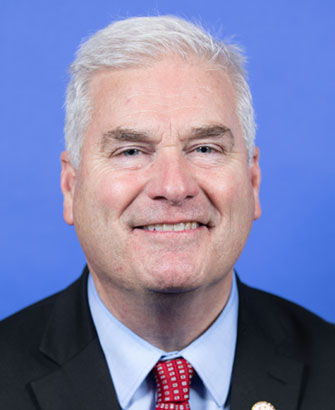

Nominee	Tom Emmer	Doug Chapin
Party	Republican	Democratic (DFL)
Popular vote	204,706	162,213
Percentage	55.7%	44.2%
- Emmer: 50–60% 60–70% Chapin: 50–60%
U.S. Representative before election
Tom Emmer
Republican
Elected U.S. Representative
Tom Emmer
Republican

The 6th district encompasses the northern suburbs and exurbs of Minneapolis, including all of Benton, Sherburne, and Wright counties and parts of Anoka, Carver, Stearns, and Washington counties. The incumbent is Republican Tom Emmer, who was re-elected with 62.0% of the vote in 2024. No Democrat has won an election for this seat since 1998.

=== Republican primary ===
==== Nominee ====
- Tom Emmer, incumbent U.S. representative

==== Eliminated in primary ====
- Chris Corey, candidate for this district in 2024
- Mike Foley, chemical engineer

==== Endorsements ====
Tom Emmer

Executive branch officials

- Donald Trump, 45th and 47th president of the United States (2017–2021, 2025–present)

Organizations

- AIPAC
- Log Cabin Republicans

Political parties

- Republican Party of Minnesota

==== Fundraising ====
Campaign finance reports as of March 31, 2026
Candidate	Raised	Spent	Cash on hand
Tom Emmer (R)	$8,309,926	$3,507,786	$4,588,674
Mike Foley (R)	$11,102	$4,519	$6,582
Source: Federal Election Commission

==== Results ====
Primary results by county: Emmer: 70–80%; 80–90%; 90–100%

Primary results by precinct: Emmer: 50–60%; 60–70%; 70–80%; 80–90%; 90–100%; Foley: 60–70%; Tie: 50%; No Votes Cast

Republican primary results
Party	Candidate	Votes	%
Republican	Tom Emmer (incumbent)	53,087	80.9
Republican	Mike Foley	10,022	15.3
Republican	Chris Corey	2,502	3.8
Total votes		65,611	100.0

=== Democratic-Farmer-Labor primary ===
==== Nominee ====
- Doug Chapin, college professor

==== Fundraising ====
Campaign finance reports as of March 31, 2026
Candidate	Raised	Spent	Cash on hand
Doug Chapin (DFL)	$239,012	$142,547	$96,465
Anson Amberson (DFL)	$939	$167	$782
Source: Federal Election Commission

==== Endorsements ====
Doug Chapin

Labor unions

- Minnesota AFL-CIO

Organizations

- Minnesota Young DFL
- Stonewall DFL
- Minnesota 50501

Political parties

- Minnesota Democratic–Farmer–Labor Party

==== Results ====
Democratic (DFL) primary results
Party	Candidate	Votes	%
Democratic (DFL)	Doug Chapin	48,394	100.0
Total votes		48,394	100.0

=== Third-party candidates ===
==== Withdrawn ====
- Kelly Doss (Forward-Independence Party), small business owner

==== Endorsements ====
Kelly Doss

Political parties

- Forward-Independence Party

=== Independents ===
==== Withdrawn ====
- Austin Winkelman, Democratic candidate for this district in 2024

=== General election ===
==== Predictions ====
Source	Ranking	As of
Decision Desk HQ	Safe R	September 8, 2026
The Cook Political Report	Safe R	February 6, 2025
Inside Elections	Safe R	March 7, 2025
Sabato's Crystal Ball	Safe R	July 15, 2025

==== Post-primary endorsements ====
Tom Emmer (R)

Organizations

- National Federation of Independent Business

2026 Minnesota's 6th congressional district election
Party	Candidate	Votes	%
Republican	Tom Emmer (incumbent)	204,706	55.7
Democratic (DFL)	Doug Chapin	162,213	44.2
Write-in		427	0.1
Total votes		367,346	100.0
Republican hold			

== District 7 ==
2026 Minnesota's 7th congressional district election
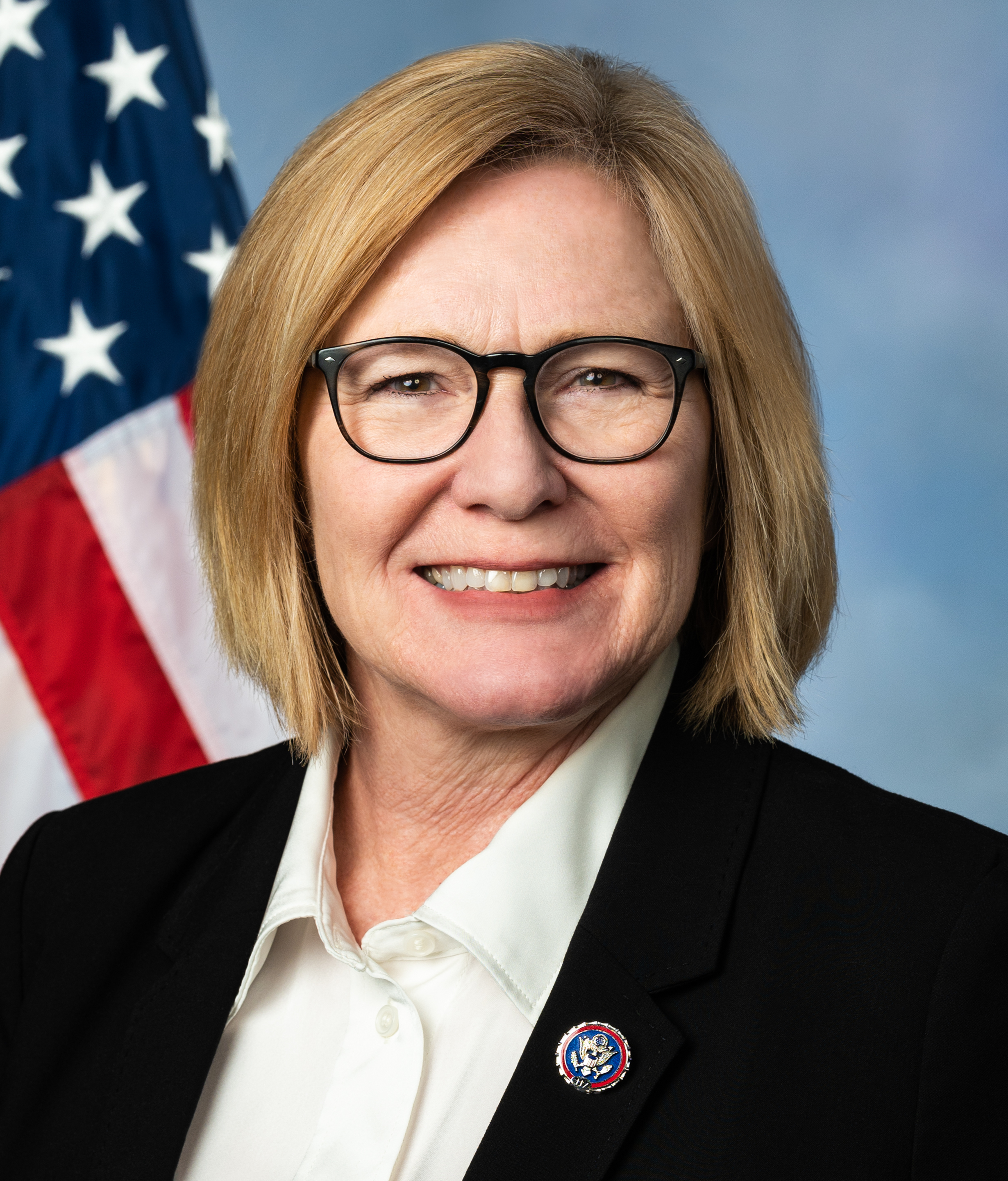

Nominee	Michelle Fischbach	Erik Osberg
Party	Republican	Democratic (DFL)
Popular vote	214,692	115,865
Percentage	64.9%	35.0%
- Fischbach: 50–60% 60–70% 70–80% Osberg: 50–60%
U.S. Representative before election
Michelle Fischbach
Republican
Elected U.S. Representative
Michelle Fischbach
Republican

The 7th district covers all but the southern end of rural western Minnesota, and includes the cities of Moorhead, Willmar, Alexandria, and Fergus Falls. The incumbent is Republican Michelle Fischbach, who was re-elected with 70.5% of the vote in 2024.

=== Republican primary ===
==== Nominee ====
- Michelle Fischbach, incumbent U.S. representative

==== Endorsements ====
Michelle Fischbach

Executive branch officials

- Donald Trump, 45th and 47th president of the United States (2017–2021, 2025–present)

Organizations

- AIPAC
- Maggie's List

Political parties

- Republican Party of Minnesota

==== Fundraising ====
Campaign finance reports as of March 31, 2026
Candidate	Raised	Spent	Cash on hand
Michelle Fischbach (R)	$987,632	$591,815	$806,897
Dave Hughes (R)	$23,051	$5,756	$17,294
Source: Federal Election Commission

==== Results ====
Republican primary results
Party	Candidate	Votes	%
Republican	Michelle Fischbach (incumbent)	69,436	100.0
Total votes		69,436	100.0

=== Democratic-Farmer-Labor primary ===
==== Nominee ====
- Erik Osberg, media marketing firm owner

==== Eliminated in primary ====
- Steve Carlson, air force veteran and government worker

==== Withdrawn ====
- Heather Keeler, state representative from district 4A (2021–present)

==== Endorsements ====
Erik Osberg

Labor unions

- Minnesota AFL-CIO

Political parties

- Minnesota Democratic–Farmer–Labor Party

==== Fundraising ====
Campaign finance reports as of June 30, 2026
Candidate	Raised	Spent	Cash on hand
Heather Keeler (DFL)	$62,500	$61,210	$1,290
Erik Osberg (DFL)	$307,950	$193,882	$114,068
Source: Federal Election Commission

==== Results ====
Primary results by county: Osberg: 50–60%; 60–70%; 70–80%

Primary results by precinct: Osberg: 50–60%; 60–70%; 70–80%; 80–90%; 90–100%; Carlson: 50–60%; 60–70%; 70–80%; 80–90%; 90–100%; 50% Tie No Votes Cast

Democratic (DFL) primary results
Party	Candidate	Votes	%
Democratic (DFL)	Erik Osberg	27,758	65.7
Democratic (DFL)	Steve Carlson	14,481	34.3
Total votes		42,239	100.0

=== General election ===
==== Predictions ====
Source	Ranking	As of
Decision Desk HQ	Safe R	July 14, 2026
The Cook Political Report	Safe R	February 6, 2025
Inside Elections	Safe R	March 7, 2025
Sabato's Crystal Ball	Safe R	July 15, 2025

==== Post-primary endorsements ====
Michelle Fischbach (R)

Organizations

- Minnesota Farm Bureau PAC
- National Federation of Independent Business
- U.S. Chamber of Commerce

==== Results ====
2026 Minnesota's 7th congressional district election
Party	Candidate	Votes	%
Republican	Michelle Fischbach (incumbent)	214,503	64.9
Democratic (DFL)	Erik Osberg	115,805	35.0
Write-in		565	0.1
Total votes		330,628	100.0
Republican hold			

== District 8 ==
2026 Minnesota's 8th congressional district election
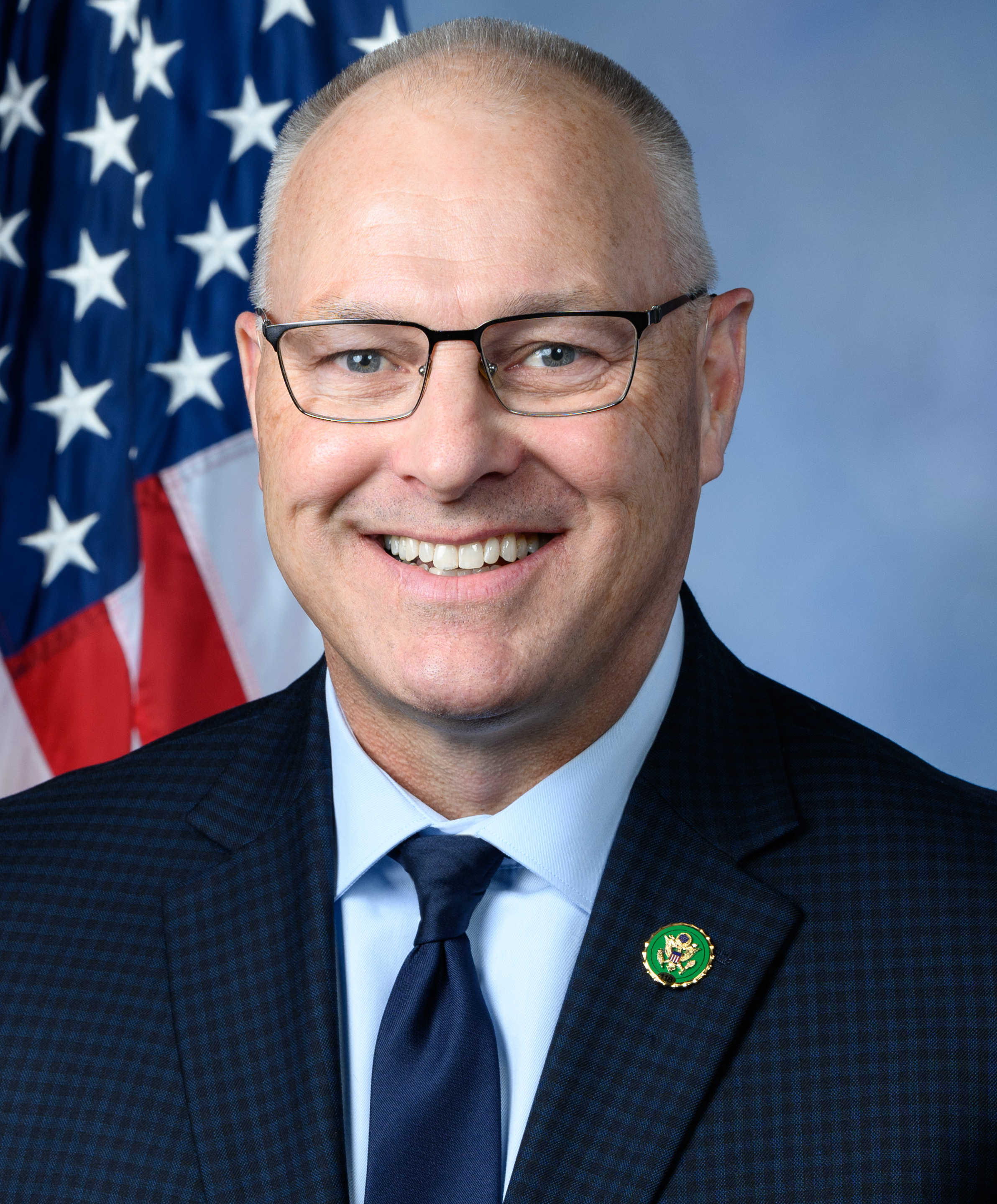

Nominee	Pete Stauber	Trina Swanson
Party	Republican	Democratic (DFL)
Popular vote	190,744	168,427
Percentage	53.1%	46.9%
- Stauber: 50–60% 60–70% 70–80% Swanson: 50–60% 60–70% 70–80%
U.S. Representative before election
Pete Stauber
Republican
Elected U.S. Representative
Pete Stauber
Republican

The 8th district is based in the Iron Range and home to the city of Duluth. The incumbent is Republican Pete Stauber, who was re-elected with 58.0% of the vote in 2024.

=== Republican primary ===
==== Nominee ====
- Pete Stauber, incumbent U.S. representative

==== Eliminated in primary ====
- Anthony Hamilton, farmer

==== Endorsements ====
Pete Stauber

Executive branch officials

- Donald Trump, 45th and 47th president of the United States (2017–2021, 2025–present)

Organizations

- AIPAC

Parties

- Republican Party of Minnesota

==== Fundraising ====
Campaign finance reports as of March 31, 2026
Candidate	Raised	Spent	Cash on hand
Pete Stauber (R)	$1,469,532	$991,440	$1,006,585
Source: Federal Election Commission

==== Results ====
Primary results by county: Stauber: 80–90%

Primary results by precinct: Stauber: 50–60%; 60–70%; 70–80%; 80–90%; 90–100%; Hamilton: 50–60%; 90–100%; 50% Tie No Votes Cast

Republican primary results
Party	Candidate	Votes	%
Republican	Pete Stauber (incumbent)	58,139	86.4
Republican	Anthony Hamilton	9,121	13.6
Total votes		67,260	100.0

=== Democratic-Farmer-Labor primary ===
==== Nominee ====
- Trina Swanson, former U.S. Citizenship and Immigration Services Director of International Operations

==== Eliminated in primary ====
- Luke Gulbranson, reality TV star
- John Munter, candidate for this district in 2022 and 2024

==== Withdrawn ====
- Cyle Cramer, attorney
- Chad McKenna, labor relations field manager for the Minnesota Nurses Association

==== Declined ====
- Grant Hauschild, state senator from the 3rd district (2023–present)

==== Endorsements ====
Trina Swanson

Labor unions

- Minnesota Association of Professional Employees

Political parties

- Minnesota Democratic–Farmer–Labor Party

==== Fundraising ====
Campaign finance reports as of March 31, 2026
Candidate	Raised	Spent	Cash on hand
Emanuel Anastos (DFL)	$5,015	$3,796	$1,218
Cyle Cramer (DFL)	$901	$1,022	$2,794
Chad McKenna (DFL)	$27,295	$25,034	$2,260
Trina Swanson (DFL)	$52,226	$33,353	$18,872
Source: Federal Election Commission

==== Results ====
Primary results by county: Swanson: 60–70%; 70–80%; 80–90%; 90–100%

Primary results by precinct: Swanson: 50–60%; 60–70%; 70–80%; 80–90%; 90–100%; Gulbranson: 40–50%; 50–60%; 60–70%; 70–80%; 90–100%; Munter: 40–50%; 50–60%; 60–70%; 70–80%; 90–100%; Tie: 40–50%; 50%; No Votes Cast

Democratic (DFL) primary results
Party	Candidate	Votes	%
Democratic (DFL)	Trina Swanson	54,413	77.2
Democratic (DFL)	Luke Gulbranson	11,888	16.9
Democratic (DFL)	John Munter	4,149	5.9
Total votes		70,450	100.0

=== Independents ===
==== Write-in candidates ====
- Debra Topping

=== General election ===
==== Predictions ====
Source	Ranking	As of
Decision Desk HQ	Likely R	July 14, 2026
The Cook Political Report	Safe R	February 6, 2025
Inside Elections	Safe R	March 7, 2025
Sabato's Crystal Ball	Safe R	July 15, 2025

==== Post-primary endorsements ====
Pete Stauber (R)

Organizations

- National Federation of Independent Business

==== Polling ====
Poll source	Date(s) administered	Sample size	Margin of error	Pete Stauber (R)	Trina Swanson (DFL)	Undecided
Public Policy Polling (D) (Note: Poll sponsored by Swanson's campaign)	October 25–26, 2026	585 (RV)	–	49%	43%	8%

Hypothetical polling

Generic Republican vs. generic Democrat

Poll source	Date(s) administered	Sample size	Margin of error	Generic Republican	Generic Democrat	Undecided
Public Policy Polling (D)	October 25–26, 2026	585 (RV)	–	48%	44%	8%

Matt Klein vs. Eric Pratt

Poll source	Date(s) administered	Sample size	Margin of error	Matt Klein (D)	Eric Pratt (R)	Undecided
Harper Polling (R)	June 18–21, 2026	415 (LV)	± 4.8%	43%	42%	15%

==== Results ====
2026 Minnesota's 8th congressional district election
Party	Candidate	Votes	%
Republican	Pete Stauber (incumbent)	190,744	53.1
Democratic (DFL)	Trina Swanson	168,350	46.8
Write-in		359	0.1
Total votes		359,453	100.0
Republican hold			

== Notes ==
Partisan clients
