= Heather Keeler =

American politician

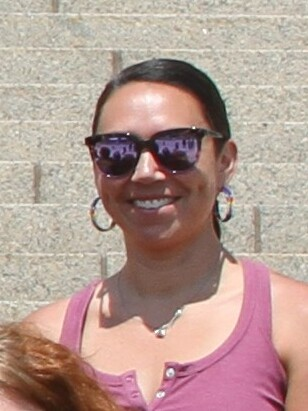

Member of the Minnesota House of Representatives from the 4A district
- Incumbent
- Assumed office January 5, 2021
- Preceded by: Ben Lien
- Succeeded by: Erika Yoney (elect)

Personal details
- Born: December 18, 1981 (age 44) South Dakota, U.S.
- Citizenship: American; Yankton Sioux Tribe
- Party: Democratic
- Children: 2
- Education: Minnesota State College Southeast (AA); Minnesota State University, Moorhead (BS, MEd)
- Website: State House website Campaign website

Heather Keeler (born December 18, 1981) is an American politician serving in the Minnesota House of Representatives since 2021. A member of the Democratic-Farmer-Labor Party (DFL), Keeler represents District 4A in northwest Minnesota, including the city of Moorhead and parts of Clay County. Keeler is an enrolled member of the Yankton Sioux Tribe.

In November 2025, Keeler announced her candidacy for Minnesota's 7th congressional district in the 2026 election.

== Early life, education and career ==
Keeler grew up on her tribal homeland in South Dakota, mostly living at Fort Pierre. She is an enrolled member of the Yankton Sioux Tribe with lineage to the Eastern Shoshone.

She moved to the Fargo–Moorhead area while attending Minnesota State University for her B.S. in project management and M.Ed. in educational leadership.

Keeler worked at North Dakota State University as an assistant director of multicultural recruitment and volunteered in the Moorhead school district. While working with the school district, she served on the human rights advisory committee and as vice chair of Moorhead's Human Rights Commission.

== Minnesota House of Representatives ==
Keeler was elected to the Minnesota House of Representatives in 2020 and was reelected in 2022. She first ran after four-term DFL incumbent Ben Lien announced he would not seek reelection.

She serves as vice chair of the Children and Families Finance and Policy Committee and also sits on the Education Policy and Human Services Finance Committees. From 2021 to 2022 she served as vice chair of the Preventing Homelessness Division of the Housing Committee. Keeler is a member of the People of Color and Indigenous (POCI) Caucus.

=== Native American issues ===
Keeler has been an outspoken advocate of Native American human rights issues and for more native voices to be heard at the state legislature. In 2021, she authored legislation that created an office of Missing and Murdered Indigenous Relatives and carried subsequent efforts to increase funding. Indigenous women make up one percent of the state's population but eight percent of women and girls murdered.

Along with State Senators Mary Kunesh and Jen McEwen, Keeler authored a letter calling on the Biden administration to stop Line 3, a tar sands pipeline proposed to cut through Minnesota tribal lands. She proposed legislation that would replace Minnesota's existing Columbus Day with Indigenous People's Day. In March 2023, the chair of the Republican Party of Minnesota criticized Keeler after she posted on Facebook about the adoption of native children by white families and wrote, "White saviors are the worst!"

=== Other political positions ===
Keeler has supported efforts to increase the number of teachers of color in Minnesota. In 2023, she authored legislation that passed with unanimous support to fund emergency food shelves in the midst of rising visits to food shelves.

== Electoral history ==
2020 DFL Primary for Minnesota State House - District 4A
Party	Candidate	Votes	%
Democratic (DFL)	Heather Keeler	1,888	66.32
Democratic (DFL)	Chuck Hendrickson	959	33.68
Total votes		2,847	100.0

2020 Minnesota State House - District 4A
Party	Candidate	Votes	%
Democratic (DFL)	Heather Keeler	11,487	56.67
Republican	Edwin Hahn	8,748	43.16
Write-in		36	0.18
Total votes		20,271	100.0
Democratic (DFL) hold			

2022 Minnesota State House - District 4A
Party	Candidate	Votes	%
Democratic (DFL)	Heather Keeler (incumbent)	7,664	58.58
Republican	Lynn Halmrast	5,403	41.30
Write-in		16	0.12
Total votes		13,083	100.0
Democratic (DFL) hold			

2024 Minnesota State House - District 4A
Party	Candidate	Votes	%
Democratic (DFL)	Heather Keeler (incumbent)	11,072	58.50
Republican	Joshua Zincke	7,822	41.33
Write-in		32	0.17
Total votes		23,313	100.0
Democratic (DFL) hold			

== Personal life ==
Keeler lives in Moorhead, Minnesota and has two children. She is an enrolled member of the Yankton Sioux Tribe.

== See also ==
- List of Native American politicians
- Native American women in politics
