= Jake Johnson (Minnesota politician) =

American politician (born 1983/1984)

- Johnson in 2026

Member-elect of the U.S. House of Representatives from Minnesota's 1st district
- Assuming office January 3, 2027
- Succeeding: Brad Finstad

Personal details
- Born: 1983 or 1984 (age 42–43) Stewartville, Minnesota, U.S.
- Party: Democratic (DFL)
- Spouse: Molly
- Children: 4
- Education: University of Wisconsin, La Crosse (BA)

Jake Johnson (born 1983/1984) is an American politician from Minnesota. He is the Member-elect for Minnesota's 1st congressional district. He was first elected in 2026, defeating incumbent Brad Finstad.

== Early life and career ==
Johnson is from Stewartville, Minnesota, where he was one of 11 children. He graduated from the University of Wisconsin–La Crosse and moved to Rochester, Minnesota, where he became a teacher in Rochester Public Schools. Johnson worked as a math teacher at John Marshall High School for 16 years and Mayo High School for four years.

== U.S. House of Representatives ==
In April 2025, Johnson declared his candidacy for the Minnesota Democratic–Farmer–Labor Party nomination for the United States House of Representatives in Minnesota's 1st congressional district against Brad Finstad.

In the 2026 midterm elections, Johnson won the DFL primary with over 80% of the vote. In the general election, unofficial results showed he led Finstad by 323 votes, a difference of less than 0.1% of all votes cast. According to the MinnPost, he did better than previous Democratic candidates in rural areas and won huge margins in Olmsted County and Rochester, respectively the biggest county and city in the district. On November 19, 2026, the State Canvassing Board officially certified Johnson as the winner. Finstad requested a recount, to which Johnson stated "I look forward to celebrating my victory again."

== Personal life ==
Johnson's wife, Molly, also grew up in Stewartville.

== Electoral history ==
2026 Minnesota's 1st congressional district election Democratic (DFL) primary results
Party	Candidate	Votes	%
Democratic (DFL)	Jake Johnson	47,255	81.7
Democratic (DFL)	Alex Eaton	10,616	18.3
Total votes		57,871	100.0

2026 Minnesota's 1st congressional district election
Party	Candidate	Votes	%
Democratic (DFL)	Jake Johnson	163,056	50.0
Republican	Brad Finstad (incumbent)	162,733	49.9
Write-in		391	0.1
Total votes		326,180	100.0
Democratic (DFL) gain from Republican			

U.S. House of Representatives
Preceded by Brad Finstad	Member of the U.S. House of Representatives from Minnesota's 1st congressional district Taking office 2027	Elect
