= Minnesota Association of Professional Employees =

MAPE
- Minnesota Association of Professional Employees
- Founded: 1980
- Headquarters: Shoreview, MN
- Location: United States
- Members: 18,500+
- Key people: Nicole Juan, President (June 2026-present)
- Affiliations: Independent
- Website: www.mape.org

The Minnesota Association of Professional Employees (MAPE) is a Minnesota-based labor union representing professional employees serving the state of Minnesota. This bargaining unit includes employees who perform various specialized, professional services from accounting to zoology. Within Minnesota, MAPE is a large state bargaining unit with over 18,500 employees.

== Origin of MAPE ==
In 1972 with the passage of the Public Employee Labor Relations Act (PELRA), state workers were given the right to join a union. Before 1972, the governor and the Minnesota Legislature controlled state employees' rights and benefits. With the passage of PELRA, state professional workers were initially represented by the international American Federation of State, County and Municipal Employees (AFSCME) - a union that currently represents many of the state's technicians, maintenance, and clerical workers.

As time passed, state professionals discovered that the workplace issues they faced differed from many of the workers in AFSCME. Therefore in 1980, these professionals voted to break away from this larger union to form their own independent union. This founding group of 4,500 grew to become the Minnesota Association of Professional Employees (MAPE). As it does not have a national umbrella organization, MAPE is one of the largest independent unions in the country.

== Structure of MAPE ==
To support a variety of worksites and employees located all over Minnesota, MAPE has broken the state down into 21 separate regions. Members of each region are served by electing their own slate of officers to represent them locally.

In order to make sure that the central organization is meeting the needs of all members in all regions, MAPE convenes a Delegate Assembly every Fall, typically in the first week or two of September.

As MAPE grew and new members joined, the organization naturally evolved. Since 1999, MAPE has worked to be a proactive, member-driven group. A new region/local structure was designed to promote grassroots activism.

== 2001 statewide strike ==
Throughout the late 90s and early 2000, Minnesota experienced a robust economy characterized by tax cuts and rebates. Things changed in 2001 after the “dot-com” bust and the events of September 11. Recessionary times gave way to grim financial forecasts amid rising healthcare costs. The struggle to maintain benefit and compensation levels for state workers finally came to a head. MAPE and AFSCME members refused to accept the high co-pays and out-of-pocket expense limits proposed by the state, so in September 2001, members of the two biggest unions representing state workers voted overwhelmingly to strike. The Minnesota Association of Professional Employees announced that 84.2 percent of its members who voted rejected the state's final contract offer and authorized a strike, and earlier that day, leaders of the American Federation of State, County and Municipal Employees (AFSCME) Council 6 filed an official notice with the Bureau of Mediation Services and the state's Department of Employee Relations that more than 13,000, or 90 percent, of its voting members had approved a strike.

Negotiators for the unions and the state held a preliminary meeting at the Bureau of Mediation Services on Sept. 6. The Bureau conducted additional sessions from Sept. 12 to Sept. 16.

The major sticking point was wages. The state had offered a wage increase of about 2.5 percent per year but said that additional increases based on years of service could increase that to about 5 percent for many workers. The members asked for increases of approximately 6 percent per year for the coming years.

Governor Jesse Ventura kept a low profile. But he did order special training exercises for the Minnesota National Guard if he would order them to replace striking state workers.

== Recent history ==
After a 2003 round of negotiations resulting in wage freezes and insurance increases, the 2005 negotiations team had a goal to ‘hold the line’ on insurance increases while negotiating a fair wage increase. Many MAPE members even felt this was unrealistic, but nonetheless, MAPE achieved its goal by holding the line on insurance increases while managing across-the-board increases for everyone.

Over the past five years, MAPE has expanded to include some school district, county and municipal government professional employees with separate bargaining agreements.

== See also ==
- Labor Unions in the United States
- Labor Movement
- List of U.S. Trade Unions
- National Labor College
- Organizing Institute
- Union Summer
- Change to Win Federation
