= 2024 United States House of Representatives elections in Minnesota =

- November 5, 2024

All 8 Minnesota seats to the United States House of Representatives
	Majority party	Minority party
Party	Democratic (DFL)	Republican
Last election	4	4
Seats won	4	4
Seat change	Steady	Steady
Popular vote	1,579,742	1,550,499
Percentage	50.20%	49.27%
Swing	▲0.10%	▲1.16%

Democratic–Farmer–Labor
50–60%
60–70%
70–80%
Republican
40–50%
50–60%
60–70%
70–80%

The 2024 United States House of Representatives elections in Minnesota were held on November 5, 2024, to elect the eight U.S. representatives from the state of Minnesota, one from each of the state's congressional districts. The elections coincided with the U.S. presidential election, other elections to the House of Representatives, elections to the United States Senate, and various state and local elections. Primary elections were held on August 13, 2024.

U.S. Representative Dean Phillips was the sole incumbent not to be re-elected, opting instead to run for president against incumbent Joe Biden in 2023. Ahead of the general election, Democrats and Republicans each controlled four seats. After the results of the general election, Democrats and Republicans retained every one of their seats.

== Overview ==
=== Statewide ===
Party	Candidates	Votes		Seats		
Party	Candidates	No.	%	No.	+/–	%
Democratic-Farmer-Labor	8	1,579,742	50.20	4	Steady	50.00
Republican	8	1,550,499	49.27	4	Steady	50.00
Other	1	9,492	0.30	0	Steady	0.0
Write-in	8	7,029	0.22	0	Steady	0.0
Total	25	3,146,762	100.0	8	Steady	100.0

Popular vote
Democratic	50.20%
Republican	49.27%
Other	0.52%

House seats
Democratic	50.00%
Republican	50.00%

=== By district ===
Results of the 2024 United States House of Representatives elections in Minnesota by district:

District	Democratic		Republican		Others		Total		Result
District	Votes	%	Votes	%	Votes	%	Votes	%	Result
District 1	156,375	41.41%	220,929	58.51%	297	0.08%	377,601	100.0%	Republican hold
District 2	231,751	55.53%	175,621	42.08%	9,947	2.38%	417,319	100.0%	Democratic hold
District 3	240,209	58.43%	170,427	41.45%	504	0.12%	411,140	100.0%	Democratic hold
District 4	242,802	67.25%	117,618	32.58%	623	0.17%	361,043	100.0%	Democratic hold
District 5	261,066	74.37%	86,213	24.56%	3,768	1.07%	351,047	100.0%	Democratic hold
District 6	155,836	37.42%	260,095	62.45%	565	0.14%	416,496	100.0%	Republican hold
District 7	114,979	29.44%	275,098	70.45%	433	0.11%	390,510	100.0%	Republican hold
District 8	176,724	41.92%	244,498	57.99%	384	0.09%	421,606	100.0%	Republican hold
Total	1,579,742	50.20%	1,550,499	49.27%	16,521	0.53%	3,146,762	100.0%	

== District 1 ==
2024 Minnesota's 1st congressional district election
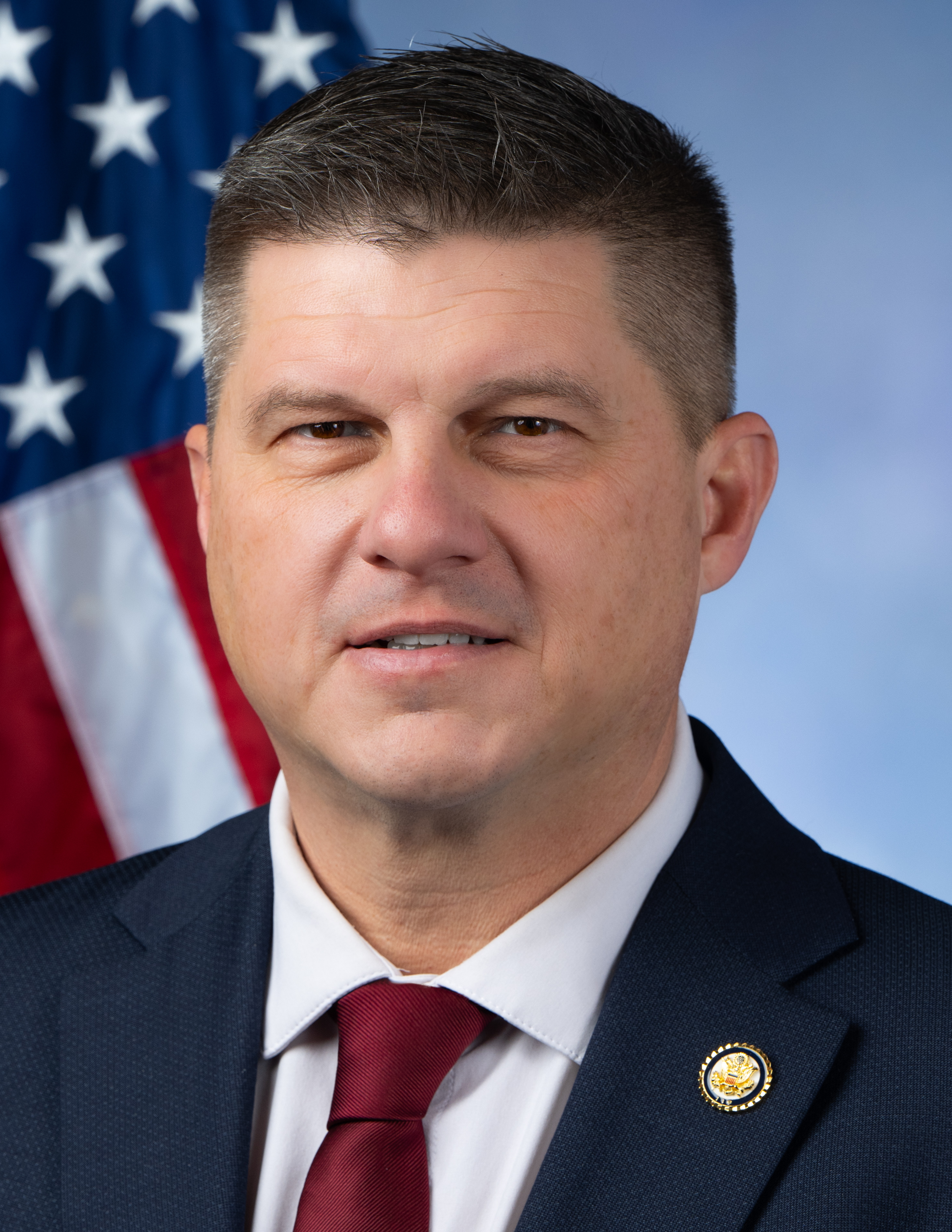

Nominee	Brad Finstad	Rachel Bohman
Party	Republican	Democratic (DFL)
Popular vote	220,929	156,375
Percentage	58.5%	41.4%
- Finstad: 50–60% 60–70% 70–80% 80–90% >90% Bohman: 50–60% 60–70% 70–80% >90% No votes
U.S. Representative before election
Brad Finstad
Republican
Elected U.S. Representative
Brad Finstad
Republican

The 1st district stretches across southern Minnesota from its borders with South Dakota to Wisconsin, and includes the cities of Rochester, Mankato, Winona, Austin, Owatonna, Albert Lea, New Ulm, and Worthington. The incumbent was Republican Brad Finstad, who was re-elected with 53.8% of the vote in 2022.

=== Republican primary ===
==== Nominee ====
- Brad Finstad, incumbent U.S. representative

==== Eliminated in primary ====
- Gregory Goetzman
- Shawn Tweten, family therapist

==== Endorsements ====
Brad Finstad

Organizations

- AIPAC
- National Right to Life Committee
- U.S. Chamber of Commerce (post-primary)

==== Fundraising ====
Campaign finance reports as of June 30, 2024
Candidate	Raised	Spent	Cash on hand
Brad Finstad (R)	$1,461,361	$817,634	$643,991
Source: Federal Election Commission

==== Results ====
Republican primary results
Party	Candidate	Votes	%
Republican	Brad Finstad (incumbent)	30,057	90.9
Republican	Shawn Tweten	1,599	4.8
Republican	Gregory Goetzman	1,409	4.3
Total votes		33,065	100.0

=== Democratic primary ===
==== Nominee ====
- Rachel Bohman, former Hennepin County elections director

==== Fundraising ====
Campaign finance reports as of March 31, 2024
Candidate	Raised	Spent	Cash on hand
Rachel Bohman (DFL)	$101,066	$5,312	$95,753
Source: Federal Election Commission

==== Results ====
Democratic (DFL) primary results
Party	Candidate	Votes	%
Democratic (DFL)	Rachel Bohman	26,406	100.0
Total votes		26,406	100.0

=== General election ===
==== Predictions ====
Source	Ranking	As of
The Cook Political Report	Solid R	February 2, 2023
Inside Elections	Solid R	March 10, 2023
Sabato's Crystal Ball	Safe R	February 23, 2023
Elections Daily	Safe R	October 26, 2023
CNalysis	Solid R	November 16, 2023

==== Results ====
2024 Minnesota's 1st congressional district election
Party	Candidate	Votes	%
Republican	Brad Finstad (incumbent)	220,929	58.5
Democratic (DFL)	Rachel Bohman	156,375	41.4
Write-in		297	0.1
Total votes		377,601	100.0
Republican hold			

== District 2 ==
2024 Minnesota's 2nd congressional district election
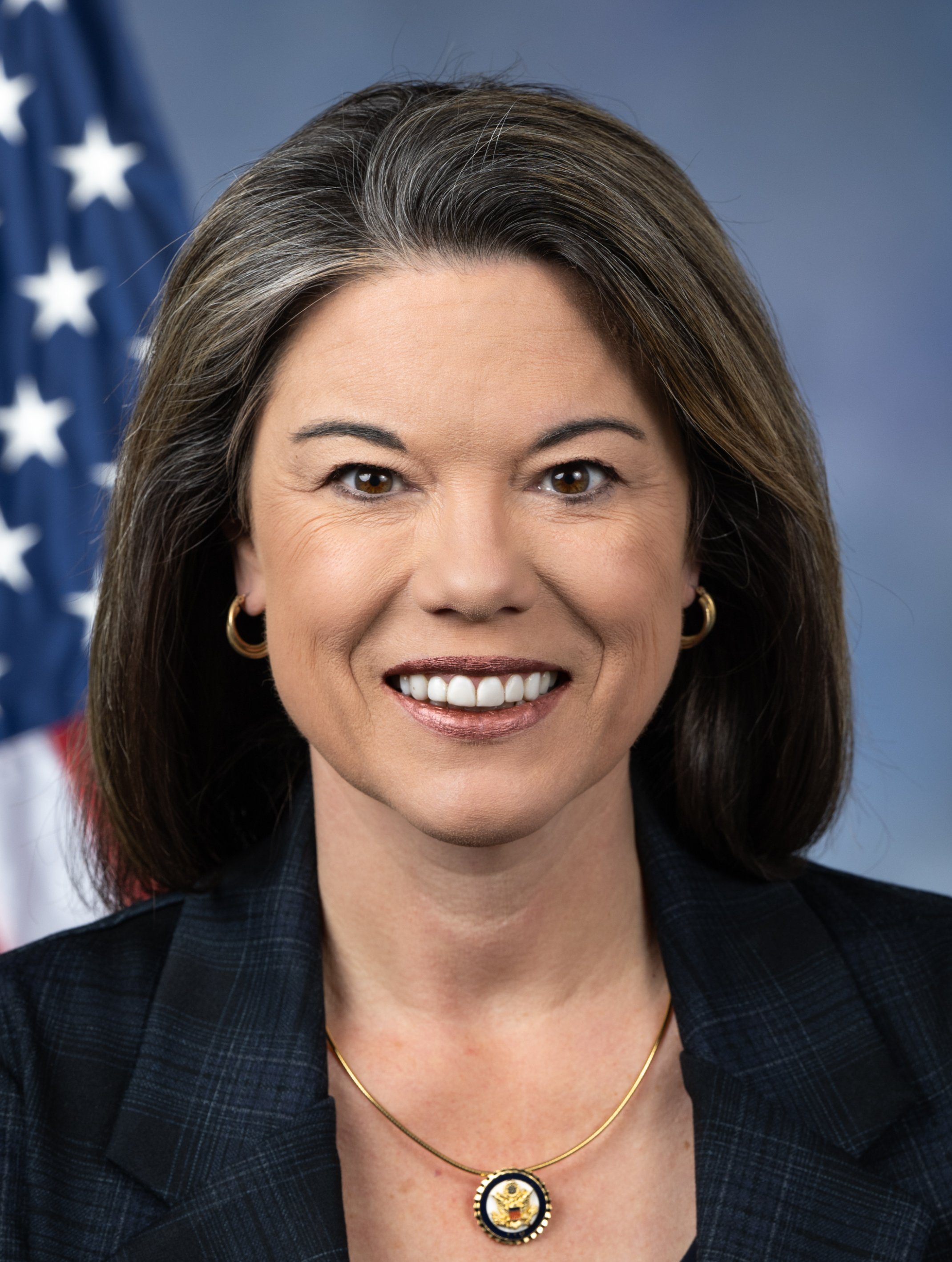

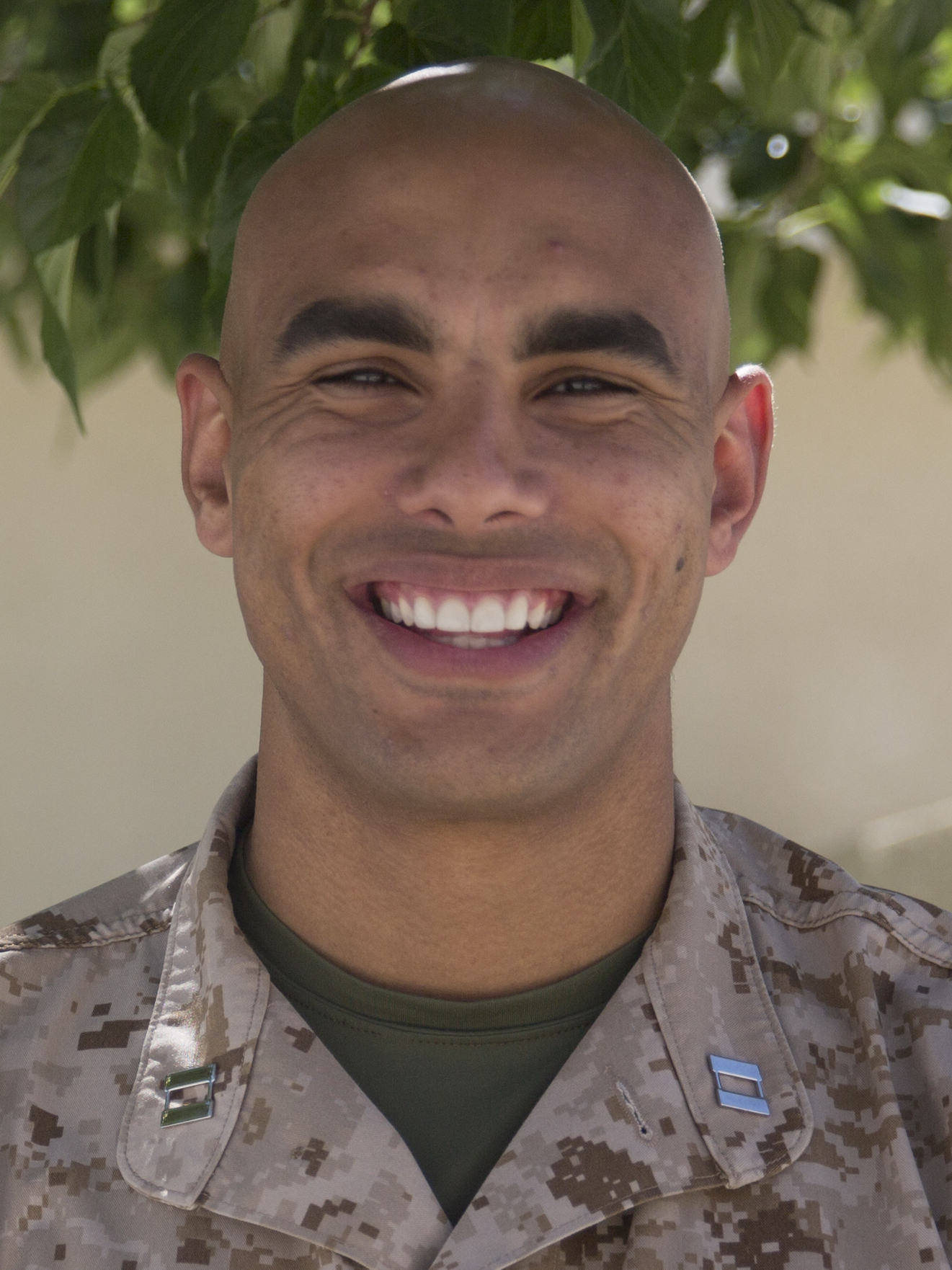
Nominee	Angie Craig	Joe Teirab
Party	Democratic (DFL)	Republican
Popular vote	231,751	175,621
Percentage	55.5%	42.1%
- Craig: 40–50% 50–60% 60–70% 70–80% 80–90% >90% Teirab: 40–50% 50–60% 60–70% 70–80%
U.S. Representative before election
Angie Craig
Democratic (DFL)
Elected U.S. Representative
Angie Craig
Democratic (DFL)

The 2nd district is based in the southern Twin Cities suburbs, including Burnsville, Eagan, and Lakeville. The incumbent was Democrat Angie Craig, who was re-elected with 50.9% of the vote in 2022.

=== Democratic primary ===
==== Nominee ====
- Angie Craig, incumbent U.S. representative

==== Eliminated in primary ====
- Mark Ives, teacher

==== Endorsements ====
Angie Craig

Statewide officials

- Gretchen Whitmer, governor of Michigan (2019–present)

Individuals

- Kelley Robinson, president of Human Rights Campaign

Organizations

- AIPAC
- Bend the Arc
- Brady PAC
- Council for a Livable World
- EMILY's List
- End Citizens United
- Everytown for Gun Safety Action Fund
- Feminist Majority PAC
- Giffords
- Human Rights Campaign
- Jewish Democratic Council of America
- Joint Action Committee for Political Affairs
- League of Conservation Voters
- LGBTQ Victory Fund
- LPAC
- NARAL Pro-Choice America
- National Women's Political Caucus
- Natural Resources Defense Council
- Planned Parenthood Action Fund
- Population Connection Action Fund
- Pro-Israel America

Labor unions

- Association of Flight Attendants
- National Education Association
- United Auto Workers

==== Fundraising ====
Campaign finance reports as of June 30, 2024
Candidate	Raised	Spent	Cash on hand
Angie Craig (DFL)	$5,594,754	$1,792,417	$3,833,263
Source: Federal Election Commission

==== Results ====
Democratic (DFL) primary results
Party	Candidate	Votes	%
Democratic (DFL)	Angie Craig (incumbent)	26,865	91.0
Democratic (DFL)	Mark Ives	2,649	9.0
Total votes		29,514	100.0

=== Republican primary ===
==== Nominee ====
- Joe Teirab, former federal prosecutor

==== Withdrawn ====
- Mike Murphy, former mayor of Lexington and candidate for governor of Minnesota in 2022
- Tayler Rahm, attorney (remained on ballot)

==== Declined ====
- Tyler Kistner, U.S. Marine Corps Reserve officer and nominee for this district in 2020 and 2022

==== Endorsements ====
Joe Teirab

U.S. representatives

- John Kline, former U.S. representative for this district (2003–2017)

Organizations

- Congressional Leadership Fund
Tayler Rahm (withdrawn)

U.S. representatives

- Jason Lewis, former U.S. representative for this district (2017–2019)

Organizations

- Minnesota Republican Party

==== Fundraising ====
Italics indicate withdrawn candidates.

Campaign finance reports as of June 30, 2024
Candidate	Raised	Spent	Cash on hand
Joe Teirab (R)	$1,536,430	$723,002	$813,427
Tayler Rahm (R)	$345,782	$286,273	$59,509
Source: Federal Election Commission

==== Results ====
Republican primary results
Party	Candidate	Votes	%
Republican	Joe Teirab	16,748	76.0
Republican	Tayler Rahm (withdrawn)	5,290	24.0
Total votes		22,038	100.0

=== Third-party candidates ===
==== Withdrawn ====
- Tom Bowman (constitutional conservative) (endorsed Teirab, remained on ballot)

=== General election ===
==== Predictions ====
Source	Ranking	As of
The Cook Political Report	Likely D	November 1, 2024
Inside Elections	Likely D	September 26, 2024
Sabato's Crystal Ball	Likely D	November 4, 2024
Elections Daily	Likely D	February 5, 2024
CNalysis	Very Likely D	August 18, 2024

==== Polling ====
Poll source	Date(s) administered	Sample size (Note: Key: A – all adults RV – registered voters LV – likely voters V – unclear)	Margin of error	Angie Craig	Joe Teirab	Tom Bowman	Undecided
SurveyUSA (Note: Poll sponsored by KSTP-TV)	October 7–13, 2024	556 (LV)	± 5.4%	49%	41%	3%	7%

==== Results ====
2024 Minnesota's 2nd congressional district election
Party	Candidate	Votes	%
Democratic (DFL)	Angie Craig (incumbent)	231,751	55.5
Republican	Joe Teirab	175,621	42.1
Constitutional conservative	Tom Bowman (withdrawn)	9,492	2.3
Write-in		455	0.1
Total votes		417,319	100.0
Democratic (DFL) hold			

== District 3 ==
2024 Minnesota's 3rd congressional district election
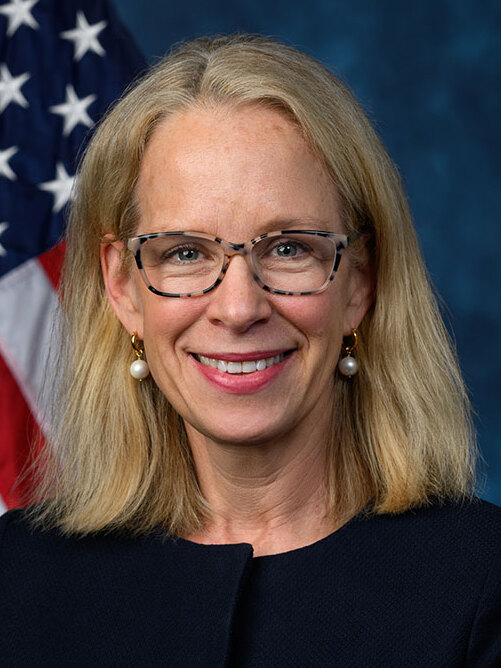

Nominee	Kelly Morrison	Tad Jude
Party	Democratic (DFL)	Republican
Popular vote	240,209	170,427
Percentage	58.4%	41.5%
- Morrison: 50–60% 60–70% 70–80% 80–90% Jude: 50–60% 60–70% 70–80%
U.S. Representative before election
Dean Phillips
Democratic (DFL)
Elected U.S. Representative
Kelly Morrison
Democratic (DFL)

The 3rd district encompasses the western suburbs of the Twin Cities, including Brooklyn Park, Coon Rapids to the northeast, Bloomington to the south, and Eden Prairie, Edina, Hopkins, Maple Grove, Plymouth, Minnetonka, and Wayzata to the west. The incumbent was Democrat Dean Phillips, who was re-elected with 59.6% of the vote in 2022. Phillips initially said he would run for re-election in the House of Representatives, but later announced his intention to run for the Democratic nomination for president. Phillips decided to forgo a reelection bid to Congress to focus on his presidential run.

Only one candidate filed for office for each major party prior to the primary election. In Minnesota, primaries are not held when neither major party has more than one candidate on the ballot.

=== Democratic primary ===
==== Nominee ====
- Kelly Morrison, former state senator

==== Withdrawn ====
- Ron Harris, chair of the Democratic National Committee Midwestern Caucus and former Minneapolis chief resilience officer (endorsed Morrison)
- Dean Phillips, incumbent U.S. representative (ran for president)

==== Declined ====
- Steve Simon, Minnesota secretary of state
- Zack Stephenson, state representative (ran for re-election)

==== Endorsements ====
Kelly Morrison

Statewide officials

- Mark Dayton, former governor of Minnesota and former U.S. senator

U.S. representatives

- Lois Frankel, U.S. representative from Florida's 22nd congressional district (2013–present)

State senators

- Alice Mann, state senator

Organizations

- 314 Action
- EMILY's List
- Everytown for Gun Safety
- National Women's Political Caucus
- NewDem Action Fund
- Reproductive Freedom for All

Labor unions

- AFSCME Council 5
Ron Harris (withdrawn)

Local officials

- Melvin Carter, mayor of Saint Paul
Dean Phillips (withdrawn)

Organizations

- AIPAC
- Population Connection Action Fund
Declined to endorse

U.S. representatives

- Dean Phillips, incumbent U.S. representative

==== Fundraising ====
Campaign finance reports as of June 30, 2024
Candidate	Raised	Spent	Cash on hand
Kelly Morrison (DFL)	$1,254,064	$574,662	$679,402
Source: Federal Election Commission

=== Republican primary ===
==== Nominee ====
- Tad Jude, former judge of the 10th district court of Minnesota, former Democratic state senator, and candidate for attorney general in 2022

==== Declined ====
- Kristin Robbins, state representative
- Jim Schultz, lawyer and nominee for attorney general in 2022

==== Endorsements ====
Tad Jude

Organizations

- Minnesota Republican Party

==== Fundraising ====
Campaign finance reports as of June 30, 2024
Candidate	Raised	Spent	Cash on hand
Tad Jude (R)	$113,394	$82,109	$31,285
Source: Federal Election Commission

=== General election ===
==== Predictions ====
Source	Ranking	As of
The Cook Political Report	Solid D	February 2, 2023
Inside Elections	Solid D	March 10, 2023
Sabato's Crystal Ball	Safe D	February 23, 2023
Elections Daily	Safe D	October 26, 2023
CNalysis	Solid D	November 16, 2023

==== Results ====
2024 Minnesota's 3rd congressional district election
Party	Candidate	Votes	%
Democratic (DFL)	Kelly Morrison	240,209	58.4
Republican	Tad Jude	170,427	41.5
Write-in		504	0.1
Total votes		411,140	100.0
Democratic (DFL) hold			

== District 4 ==
2024 Minnesota's 4th congressional district election
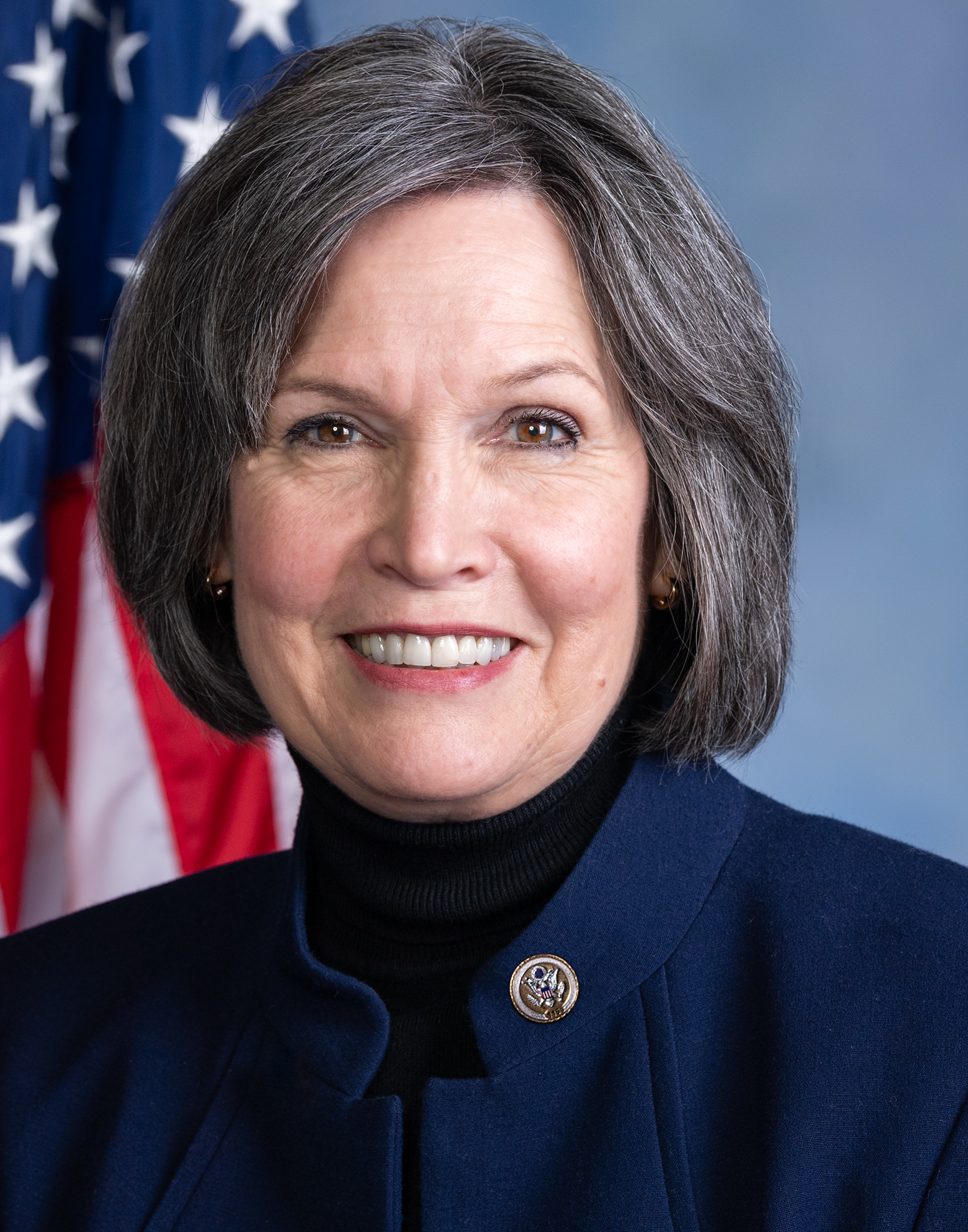

Nominee	Betty McCollum	May Lor Xiong
Party	Democratic (DFL)	Republican
Popular vote	242,802	117,618
Percentage	67.2%	32.6%
- McCollum: 50–60% 60–70% 70–80% 80–90% >90% Xiong: 50–60% No votes
U.S. Representative before election
Betty McCollum
Democratic (DFL)
Elected U.S. Representative
Betty McCollum
Democratic (DFL)

The 4th district encompasses the Saint Paul half of the Twin Cities metro area, including Ramsey County and parts of Washington County. The incumbent was Democrat Betty McCollum, who was reelected with 67.6% of the vote in 2022

=== Democratic primary ===
==== Nominee ====
- Betty McCollum, incumbent U.S. representative

==== Endorsements ====
Betty McCollum

Organizations

- Feminist Majority PAC
- Humane Society Legislative Fund
- Planned Parenthood Action Fund
- Population Connection Action Fund
- Sierra Club

Labor unions

- National Education Association

==== Fundraising ====
Campaign finance reports as of June 30, 2024
Candidate	Raised	Spent	Cash on hand
Betty McCollum (DFL)	$1,334,530	$992,789	$649,419
Source: Federal Election Commission

==== Results ====
Democratic (DFL) primary results
Party	Candidate	Votes	%
Democratic (DFL)	Betty McCollum (incumbent)	37,530	100.0
Total votes		37,530	100.0

=== Republican primary ===
==== Nominee ====
- May Lor Xiong, teacher and candidate for this district in 2022

==== Eliminated in primary ====
- Gene Rechtzigel, property manager and perennial candidate

==== Fundraising ====
Campaign finance reports as of June 30, 2024
Candidate	Raised	Spent	Cash on hand
May Lor Xiong (R)	$44,212	$24,566	$19,646
Source: Federal Election Commission

==== Results ====
Republican primary results
Party	Candidate	Votes	%
Republican	May Lor Xiong	7,777	63.0
Republican	Gene Rechtzigel	4,558	37.0
Total votes		12,335	100.0

=== General election ===
==== Predictions ====
Source	Ranking	As of
The Cook Political Report	Solid D	February 2, 2023
Inside Elections	Solid D	March 10, 2023
Sabato's Crystal Ball	Safe D	February 23, 2023
Elections Daily	Safe D	October 26, 2023
CNalysis	Solid D	November 16, 2023

==== Results ====
2024 Minnesota's 4th congressional district election
Party	Candidate	Votes	%
Democratic (DFL)	Betty McCollum (incumbent)	242,802	67.2
Republican	May Lor Xiong	117,618	32.6
Write-in		623	0.2
Total votes		361,043	100.0
Democratic (DFL) hold			

== District 5 ==
2024 Minnesota's 5th congressional district election
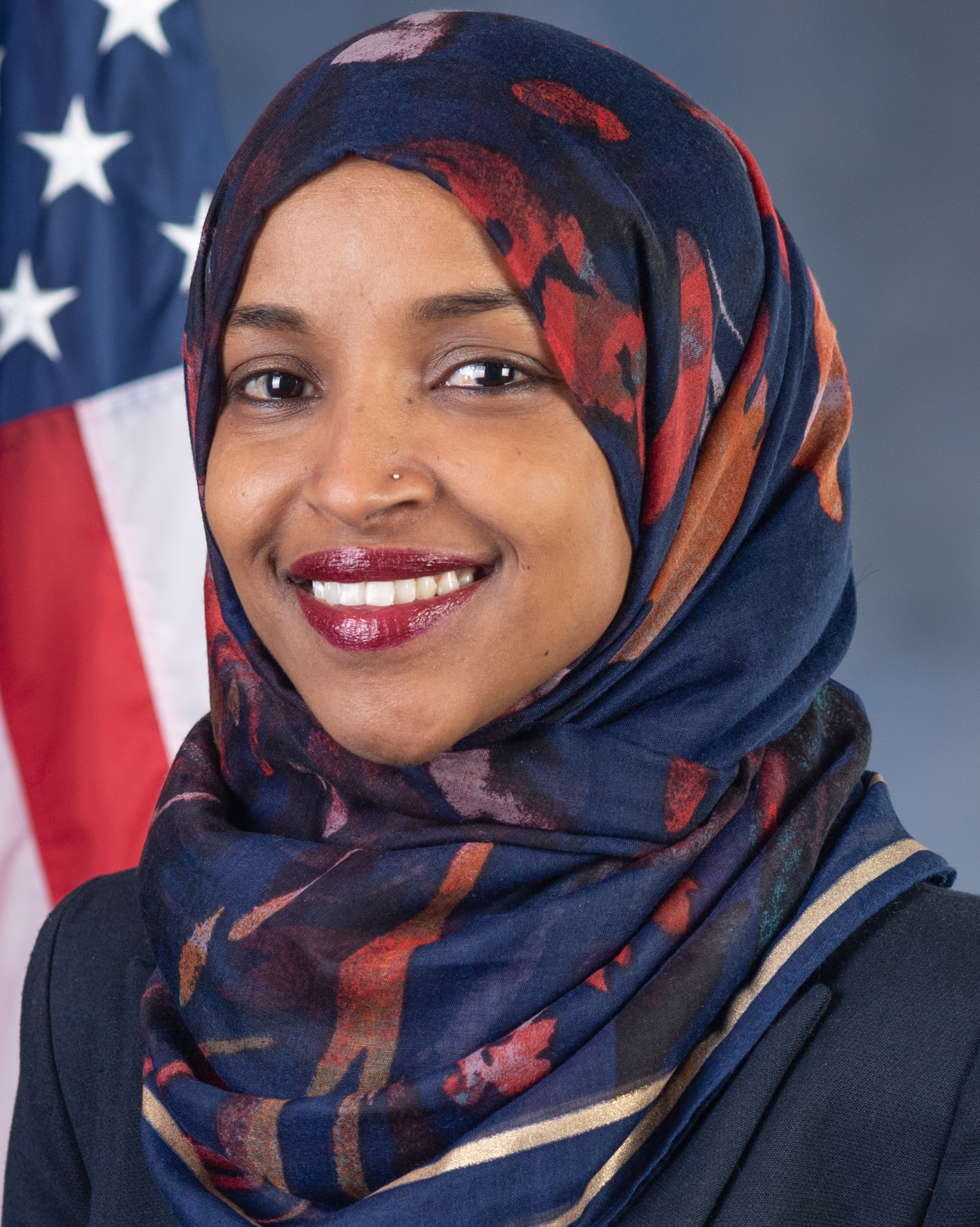

Nominee	Ilhan Omar	Dalia al-Aqidi
Party	Democratic (DFL)	Republican
Popular vote	261,066	86,213
Percentage	74.4%	24.6%
- Omar: 50–60% 60–70% 70–80% 80–90% >90% al-Aqidi: 50–60%
U.S. Representative before election
Ilhan Omar
Democratic (DFL)
Elected U.S. Representative
Ilhan Omar
Democratic (DFL)

The 5th district encompasses eastern Hennepin County, including all of Minneapolis and the cities of St. Louis Park, Richfield, Crystal, Robbinsdale, Golden Valley, New Hope, and Fridley. The incumbent was Democrat Ilhan Omar, who was re-elected with 74.3% of the vote in 2022.

=== Democratic primary ===
Omar was considered vulnerable to a primary challenge after she was renominated with just 50.3% of the vote in 2022.

==== Nominee ====
- Ilhan Omar, incumbent U.S. representative

==== Eliminated in primary ====
- Abena McKenzie
- Don Samuels, former Minneapolis city council member and candidate for this district in 2022
- Nate Schluter, U.S. Army veteran and candidate for this district in 2022

==== Withdrawn ====
- Tim Peterson, former National Guard recruiter (endorsed Samuels)

==== Endorsements ====
Ilhan Omar

U.S. senators

- Bernie Sanders, U.S. senator from Vermont (2007–present)
- Tina Smith, U.S. senator from Minnesota (2018–present)

U.S. representatives

- Pete Aguilar, U.S. representative from California (2015–present) and Chair of the House Democratic Caucus (2023–present)
- Katherine Clark, U.S. representative for Massachusetts's 5th congressional district (2013–present) and House Minority Whip (2023–present)
- Jim Clyburn, U.S. representative for South Carolina's 6th congressional district (1993–present) and former House Majority Whip (2019–2023)
- Steny Hoyer, U.S. representative from Maryland (1981–present) and former House majority leader (2019–2023)
- Hakeem Jeffries, U.S. representative for New York's 8th congressional district (2013–present) and House minority leader (2023–present)
- Nancy Pelosi, U.S. representative from California (1987–present) and former speaker of the House (2007–2011; 2019–2023)

Statewide officials

- Keith Ellison, Minnesota attorney general (2018–present)

State legislators

- Omar Fateh, state senator

Organizations

- Congressional Black Caucus PAC
- Council for a Livable World
- Friends of the Earth Action
- Humane Society Legislative Fund
- Jewish Voice for Peace Action fund
- Justice Democrats
- National Organization for Women PAC
- National Women's Political Caucus
- Our Revolution
- Peace Action
- People's Action
- Planned Parenthood Action Fund
- Sierra Club
- Sunrise Movement
- TakeAction Minnesota

Labor unions

- AFSCME Council 5
- National Education Association

Political parties

- Minnesota Democratic–Farmer–Labor Party
- Working Families Party
Don Samuels

Labor unions

- IUOE Local 49
- United Steel Workers

==== Polling ====
Poll source	Date(s) administered	Sample size	Margin of error	Ilhan Omar	Don Samuels	Undecided
Lake Research Partners (Note: Poll sponsored by Omar's campaign)	July 17–21, 2024	400 (LV)	± 4.9%	60%	33%	5%
Lake Research Partners	May 2024	400 (LV)	± 4.9%	55%	30%	9%
Victoria Research (Note: Poll sponsored by Samuels's campaign)	February 20–27, 2024	1,120 (LV)	± 3.0%	49%	30%	21%

==== Fundraising ====
Campaign finance reports as of June 30, 2024
Candidate	Raised	Spent	Cash on hand
Ilhan Omar (DFL)	$6,522,243	$4,739,166	$1,834,794
Don Samuels (DFL)	$755,457	$575,610	$232,502
Source: Federal Election Commission

==== Results ====
Results by precinct: Omar: 40–50%; 50–60%; 60–70%; 70–80%; 80–90%; 90–100%; Samuels: 40–50%; 50–60%; 60–70%; 70–80%; 80–90%; Tie: 40–50%

Democratic (DFL) primary results
Party	Candidate	Votes	%
Democratic (DFL)	Ilhan Omar (incumbent)	67,926	56.2
Democratic (DFL)	Don Samuels	51,839	42.9
Democratic (DFL)	Nate Schluter	575	0.5
Democratic (DFL)	Abena McKenzie	461	0.4
Total votes		120,801	100.0

=== Republican primary ===
==== Nominee ====
- Dalia Al-Aqidi, media advisor and candidate for this district in 2020

==== Fundraising ====
Campaign finance reports as of June 30, 2024
Candidate	Raised	Spent	Cash on hand
Dalia Al-Aqidi (R)	$1,106,586	$995,002	$111,583
Source: Federal Election Commission

==== Results ====
Republican primary results
Party	Candidate	Votes	%
Republican	Dalia Al-Aqidi	3,380	100.0
Total votes		3,380	100.0

=== General election ===
==== Predictions ====
Source	Ranking	As of
The Cook Political Report	Solid D	February 2, 2023
Inside Elections	Solid D	March 10, 2023
Sabato's Crystal Ball	Safe D	February 23, 2023
Elections Daily	Safe D	October 26, 2023
CNalysis	Solid D	November 16, 2023

==== Results ====
2024 Minnesota's 5th congressional district election
Party	Candidate	Votes	%
Democratic (DFL)	Ilhan Omar (incumbent)	261,066	74.4
Republican	Dalia Al-Aqidi	86,213	24.6
Write-in		3,768	1.1
Total votes		351,047	100.0
Democratic (DFL) hold			

== District 6 ==
2024 Minnesota's 6th congressional district election
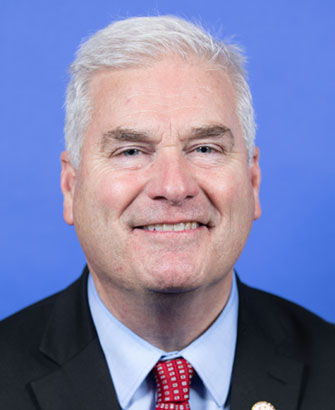

Nominee	Tom Emmer	Jeanne Hendricks
Party	Republican	Democratic (DFL)
Popular vote	260,095	155,836
Percentage	62.5%	37.4%
- Emmer: 50–60% 60–70% 70–80% 80–90% >90% Hendricks: 50–60% 60–70% 70–80% No votes
U.S. Representative before election
Tom Emmer
Republican
Elected U.S. Representative
Tom Emmer
Republican

The incumbent was Republican Tom Emmer, who was re-elected with 62.0% of the vote in 2022.

=== Republican primary ===
==== Nominee ====
- Tom Emmer, incumbent U.S. representative

==== Eliminated in primary ====
- Chris Corey

==== Endorsements ====
Tom Emmer

Organizations

- AIPAC
- National Right to Life Committee

==== Fundraising ====
Campaign finance reports as of June 30, 2024
Candidate	Raised	Spent	Cash on hand
Tom Emmer (R)	$6,691,650	$4,243,103	$3,094,174
Source: Federal Election Commission

==== Results ====
Republican primary results
Party	Candidate	Votes	%
Republican	Tom Emmer (incumbent)	21,624	87.0
Republican	Chris Corey	3,218	13.0
Total votes		24,842	100.0

=== Democratic primary ===
==== Nominee ====
- Jeanne Hendricks, nurse and nominee for this district in 2022

==== Eliminated in primary ====
- Austin Winkelman, molding technician

==== Fundraising ====
Campaign finance reports as of June 30, 2024
Candidate	Raised	Spent	Cash on hand
Jeanne Hendricks (DFL)	$25,331	$9,284	$16,227
Austin Winkelman (DFL)	$9,005	$2,420	$15,286
Source: Federal Election Commission

==== Results ====
Democratic (DFL) primary results
Party	Candidate	Votes	%
Democratic (DFL)	Jeanne Hendricks	14,895	83.8
Democratic (DFL)	Austin Winkelman	2,878	16.2
Total votes		17,773	100.0

=== General election ===
==== Predictions ====
Source	Ranking	As of
The Cook Political Report	Solid R	February 2, 2023
Inside Elections	Solid R	March 10, 2023
Sabato's Crystal Ball	Safe R	February 23, 2023
Elections Daily	Safe R	October 26, 2023
CNalysis	Solid R	November 16, 2023

==== Results ====
2024 Minnesota's 6th congressional district election
Party	Candidate	Votes	%
Republican	Tom Emmer (incumbent)	260,095	62.5
Democratic (DFL)	Jeanne Hendricks	155,836	37.4
Write-in		565	0.1
Total votes		416,496	100.0
Republican hold			

== District 7 ==
2024 Minnesota's 7th congressional district election
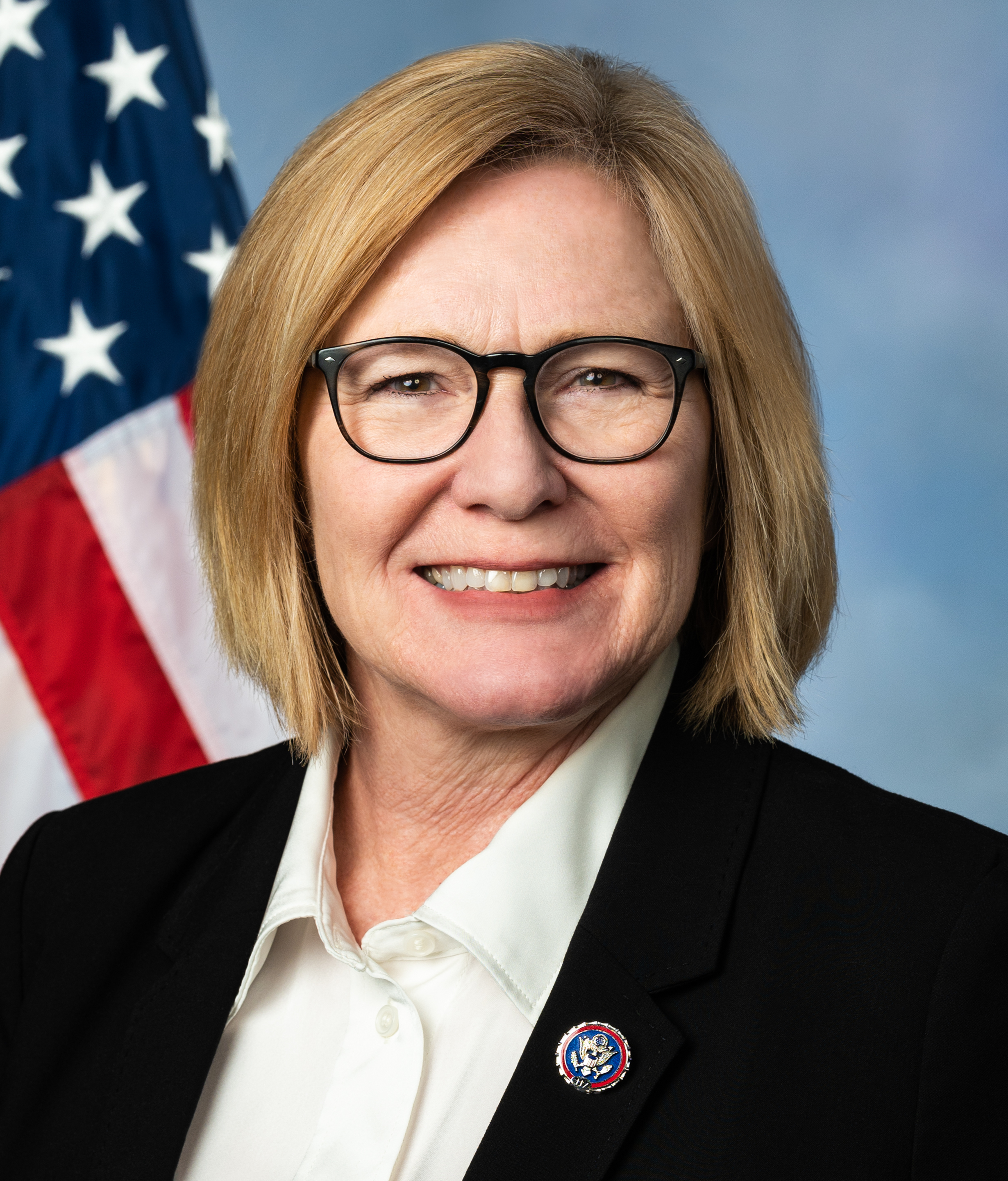

Nominee	Michelle Fischbach	John Peters
Party	Republican	Democratic (DFL)
Popular vote	275,098	114,979
Percentage	70.4%	29.4%
- Fischbach: 50–60% 60–70% 70–80% 80–90% >90% Peters: 50–60% 60–70% 70–80% Tie: 50% No votes
U.S. Representative before election
Michelle Fischbach
Republican
Elected U.S. Representative
Michelle Fischbach
Republican

The 7th district covers all but the southern end of rural western Minnesota, and includes the cities of Moorhead, Willmar, Alexandria, and Fergus Falls. The incumbent was Republican Michelle Fischbach, who was re-elected with 67.0% of the vote in 2022.

=== Republican primary ===
==== Nominee ====
- Michelle Fischbach, incumbent U.S. representative

==== Eliminated in primary ====
- Steve Boyd, businessman

==== Endorsements ====
Michelle Fischbach

Executive branch officials

- Donald Trump, 45th president of the United States (2017–2021)

Organizations

- AIPAC
- National Right to Life Committee
- U.S. Chamber of Commerce
Declined to endorse

Organizations

- Minnesota Republican Party

==== Fundraising ====
Campaign finance reports as of June 30, 2024
Candidate	Raised	Spent	Cash on hand
Steve Boyd (R)	$164,738	$154,472	$10,265
Michelle Fischbach (R)	$1,448,346	$752,065	$707,286
Source: Federal Election Commission

==== Polling ====
Poll source	Date(s) administered	Sample size	Margin of error	Steve Boyd	Michelle Fischbach	Undecided
Cygnal (Note: Poll sponsored by Fischbach's campaign)	June 24–26, 2024	400 (LV)	± 4.9%	14%	64%	22%
Cygnal	April 30–May 1, 2024	400 (LV)	± 4.86%	14%	61%	26%

==== Results ====
Results by county: Fischbach—80–90% Fischbach—70–80% Fischbach—60–70% Fischbach—50–60% Boyd—50–60% Boyd—60–70% Boyd—70–80%

Republican primary results
Party	Candidate	Votes	%
Republican	Michelle Fischbach (incumbent)	30,458	64.7
Republican	Steve Boyd	16,645	35.3
Total votes		47,103	100.0

=== Democratic primary ===
==== Nominee ====
- John Peters, computer services consultant

==== Results ====
Democratic (DFL) primary results
Party	Candidate	Votes	%
Democratic (DFL)	John Peters	16,828	100.0
Total votes		16,828	100.0

=== General election ===
==== Predictions ====
Source	Ranking	As of
The Cook Political Report	Solid R	February 2, 2023
Inside Elections	Solid R	March 10, 2023
Sabato's Crystal Ball	Safe R	February 23, 2023
Elections Daily	Safe R	October 26, 2023
CNalysis	Solid R	November 16, 2023

==== Results ====
2024 Minnesota's 7th congressional district election
Party	Candidate	Votes	%
Republican	Michelle Fischbach (incumbent)	275,098	70.4
Democratic (DFL)	John Peters	114,979	29.4
Write-in		433	0.1
Total votes		390,510	100.0
Republican hold			

== District 8 ==
2024 Minnesota's 8th congressional district election
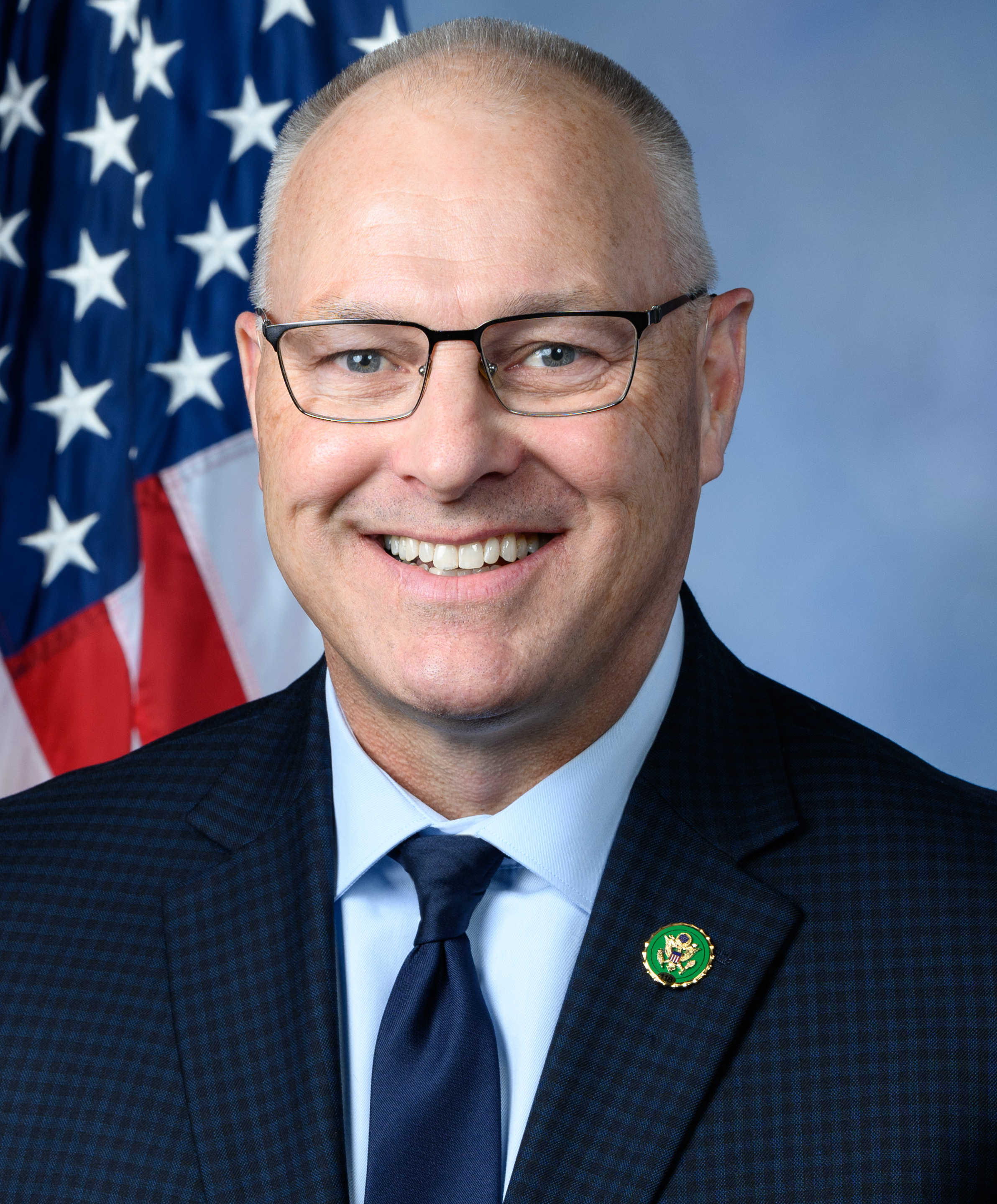

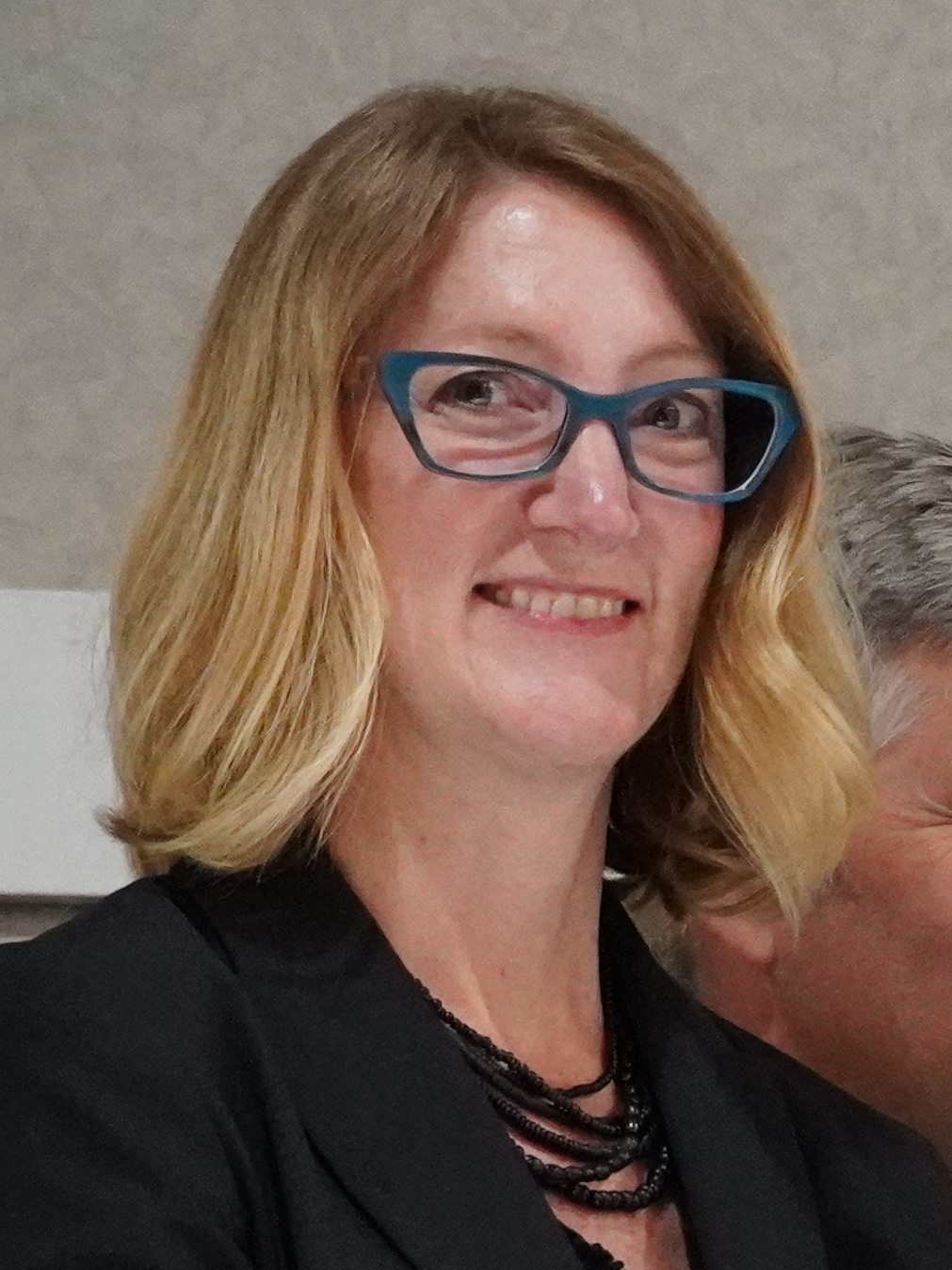
Nominee	Pete Stauber	Jennifer Schultz
Party	Republican	Democratic (DFL)
Popular vote	244,498	176,724
Percentage	58.0%	41.9%
- Stauber: 50–60% 60–70% 70–80% 80–90% >90% Schultz: 50–60% 60–70% 70–80% 80–90% >90% Tie: 50% No votes
U.S. Representative before election
Pete Stauber
Republican
Elected U.S. Representative
Pete Stauber
Republican

The 8th district is based in the Iron Range and home to the city of Duluth. The incumbent was Republican Pete Stauber, who was re-elected with 57.2% of the vote in 2022.

=== Republican primary ===
==== Nominee ====
- Pete Stauber, incumbent U.S. representative

==== Eliminated in primary ====
- Harry Welty, former at-large Duluth Public Schools board member and perennial candidate

==== Endorsements ====
Pete Stauber

Organizations

- AIPAC
- National Right to Life Committee
- U.S. Chamber of Commerce (post-primary)

Labor unions

- International Brotherhood of Teamsters Local 120

==== Fundraising ====
Campaign finance reports as of March 31, 2024
Candidate	Raised	Spent	Cash on hand
Pete Stauber (R)	$1,344,697	$858,201	$914,929
Source: Federal Election Commission

==== Results ====
Results by county: Stauber—90–100% Stauber—80–90%

Republican primary results
Party	Candidate	Votes	%
Republican	Pete Stauber (incumbent)	36,928	90.5
Republican	Harry Welty	3,874	9.5
Total votes		40,802	100.0

=== Democratic primary ===
==== Nominee ====
- Jennifer Schultz, former state representative and nominee for this district in 2022

==== Eliminated in primary ====
- John Munter, retired airline employee and candidate for this district in 2022

==== Endorsements ====
Jennifer Schultz

Labor unions

- National Education Association

==== Fundraising ====
Campaign finance reports as of March 31, 2024
Candidate	Raised	Spent	Cash on hand
Jennifer Schultz (DFL)	$501,911	$249,036	$292,292
Source: Federal Election Commission

==== Results ====
Results by county: Schultz—90–100% Schultz—80–90% Schultz—70–80%

Democratic (DFL) primary results
Party	Candidate	Votes	%
Democratic (DFL)	Jennifer Schultz	32,149	91.0
Democratic (DFL)	John Munter	3,194	9.0
Total votes		35,343	100.0

=== General election ===
==== Predictions ====
Source	Ranking	As of
The Cook Political Report	Safe R	February 2, 2023
Inside Elections	Safe R	March 10, 2023
Sabato's Crystal Ball	Safe R	February 23, 2023
Elections Daily	Safe R	October 26, 2023
CNalysis	Solid R	November 16, 2023

==== Results ====
2024 Minnesota's 8th congressional district election
Party	Candidate	Votes	%
Republican	Pete Stauber (incumbent)	244,498	58.0
Democratic (DFL)	Jennifer Schultz	176,724	41.9
Write-in		384	0.1
Total votes		421,606	100.0
Republican hold			

== Notes ==
Partisan clients
