= Joe Radinovich =

American politician

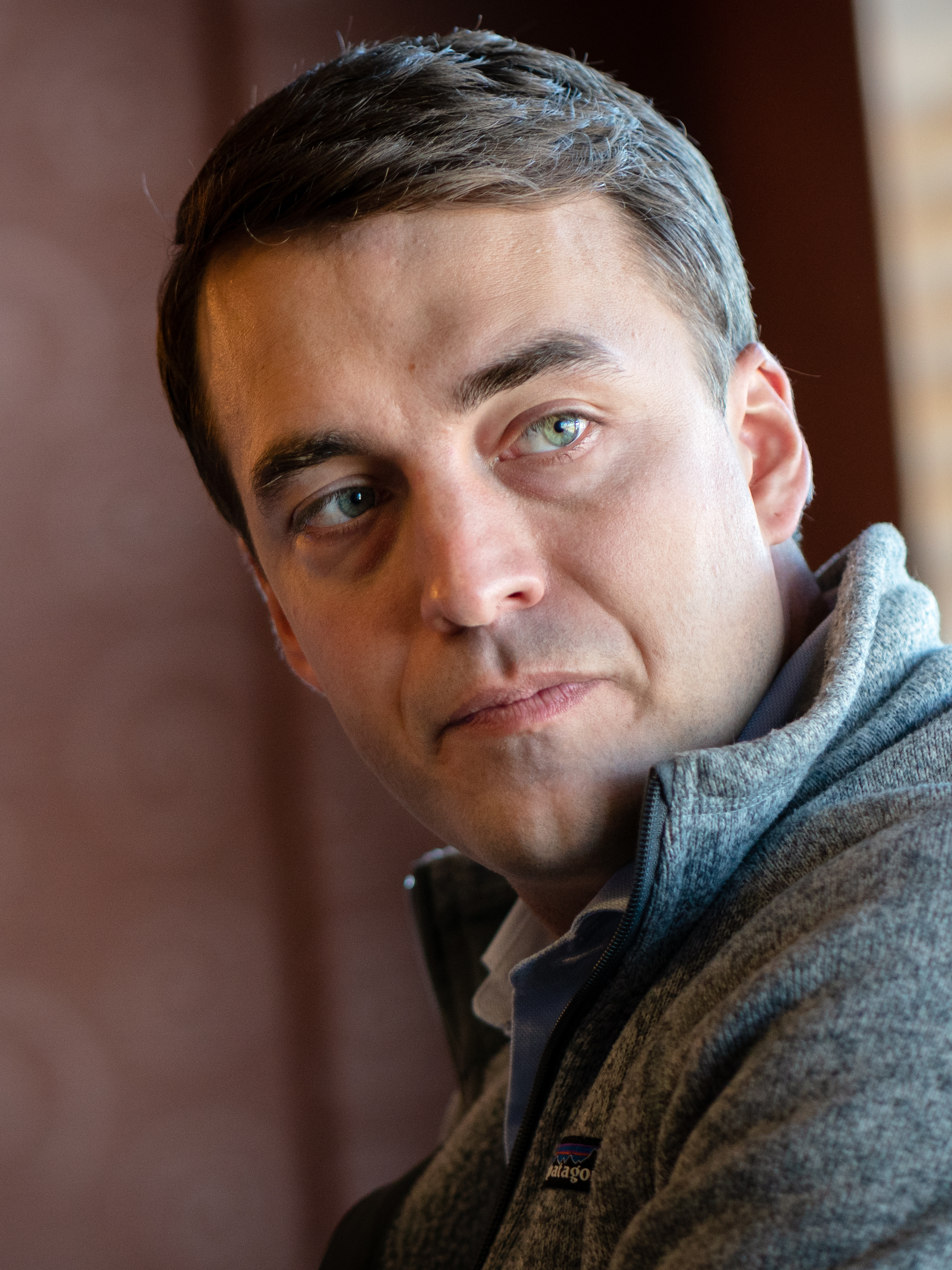

Member of the Minnesota House of Representatives from the 10B district
- In office January 8, 2013 – January 5, 2015
- Preceded by: Redistricted
- Succeeded by: Dale Lueck

Personal details
- Born: Joseph Paul Radinovich; April 7, 1986 (age 40) Crosby, Minnesota, U.S.
- Party: Democratic (DFL)
- Spouse: Carly Melin
- Education: Macalester College

Joseph Paul Radinovich (born April 7, 1986) is an American politician and former member of the Minnesota House of Representatives. As a member of the Minnesota Democratic–Farmer–Labor Party (DFL), he represented District 10B in north-central Minnesota. He was the DFL candidate for the United States House of Representatives in Minnesota's 8th congressional district in the November 2018 general election, losing to Republican Pete Stauber.

Radinoivch has worked as a campaign manager for candidates including for the city of Minneapolis mayor Jacob Frey, who Radinovich also serves as an advisor.

== Early life ==
Radinovich was born and raised in Crosby, Minnesota. In eighth grade, the Crosby-Ironton School District which he attended proposed a large budget cut, leading Radinovich to attend a school board meeting and to participate in a student walkout.

Radinovich attended Crosby-Ironton High School, where he competed in cross country and track and field. While he was in high school, one of his close relatives attempted suicide, leading Radinovich to miss most of his junior year in order to be in the intensive care unit with his family. In February 2004, Radinovich's mother was killed by his step-grandfather, who then killed himself.

He attended Macalester College from 2004 to 2007. In 2005, when the teachers in Crosby-Ironton went on strike, he returned to his hometown to walk picket lines with faculty members.

Radinovich became engaged to former state representative Carly Melin in 2018 and they have since married.

== Minnesota House of Representatives ==
Radinovich was elected to the Minnesota House of Representatives in 2012, defeating Dale Lueck 50.7% to 49.3%. Before winning the general election, Radinovich defeated David Schaff in the primary. Schaff criticized the then-25-year-old Radinovich for being "extremely young."

Soon after his election, Radinovich faced a difficult situation over his position on legally recognizing same-sex marriages, after his district voted for Minnesota Amendment 1 by a large margin. A series of suicides by gay students in the Anoka school district in 2011 convinced him that same-sex marriage should be legal. The students' deaths were especially compelling for Radinovich due to his own family's experience with depression and suicide. Radinovich's voting to legalize gay marriage proved controversial for both the public and his House colleagues, and he was defeated by Dale Lueck in his 2014 House re-election bid, 52% to 48%.

== Campaign work ==
After being defeated for reelection to the Minnesota House of Representatives, Radinovich became campaign manager for Congressman Rick Nolan's successful 2016 reelection in Minnesota's 8th congressional district. In 2017, Radinovich managed Jacob Frey's successful campaign for Minneapolis mayor, then became the chief of staff for Frey's administration. In 2021, Radinovich managed Frey's mayoral re-election campaign, winning 56% to 44%.

In 2022, he began managing the campaign for Don Samuels, who is running against incumbent Ilhan Omar in the Fifth Congressional District. Samuels lost the DFL endorsement to Omar (receiving 37% of the delegate votes to Omar's 62%) but decided to stay in the race through the August primary where he lost by about 2 percentage points. Samuels is running again for the 2024 congressional seat against Omar and his campaign is again being managed by Radinovich. Again, Don Samuels lost by wider 13% margin to Omar.

== 2018 U.S. House campaign ==
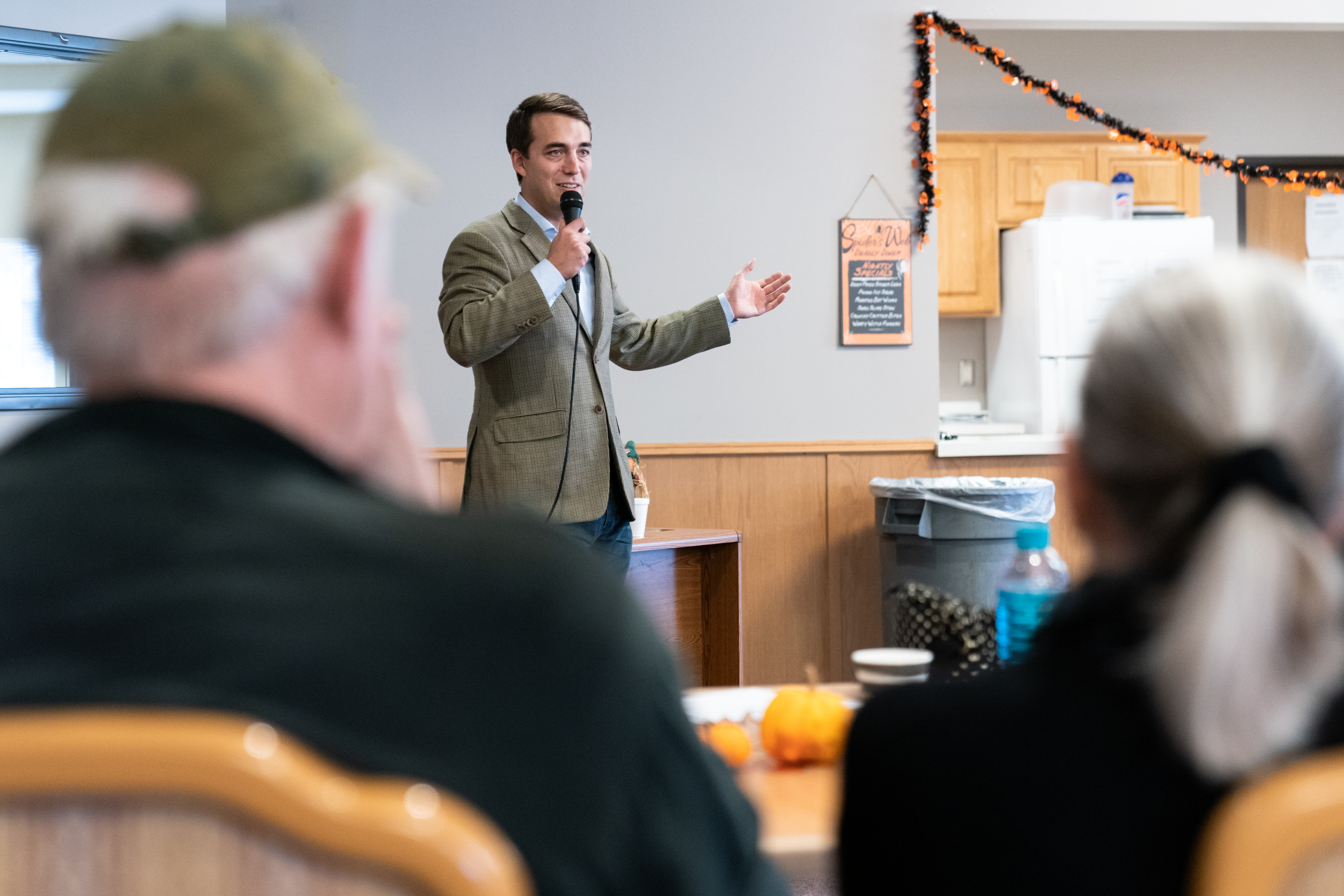
Radinovich campaigning in 2018

On February 15, 2018, Radinovich announced his candidacy for Minnesota's 8th congressional district, following Representative Rick Nolan's announcement he would not seek re-election. He won the Democratic primary on August 14, 2018. Radinovich was subsequently endorsed by former U.S. President Barack Obama and former Vice Presidents Walter Mondale and Joe Biden. Radinovich's campaign was opposed by $7.1 million in negative advertisements from the Congressional Leadership Fund and America First Action Super PACs.

Radinovich faced St. Louis County Commissioner Pete Stauber in the November 2018 midterm election, losing to Stauber by a margin of 50.7% to 45.2%.
