= Carly Melin =

American politician

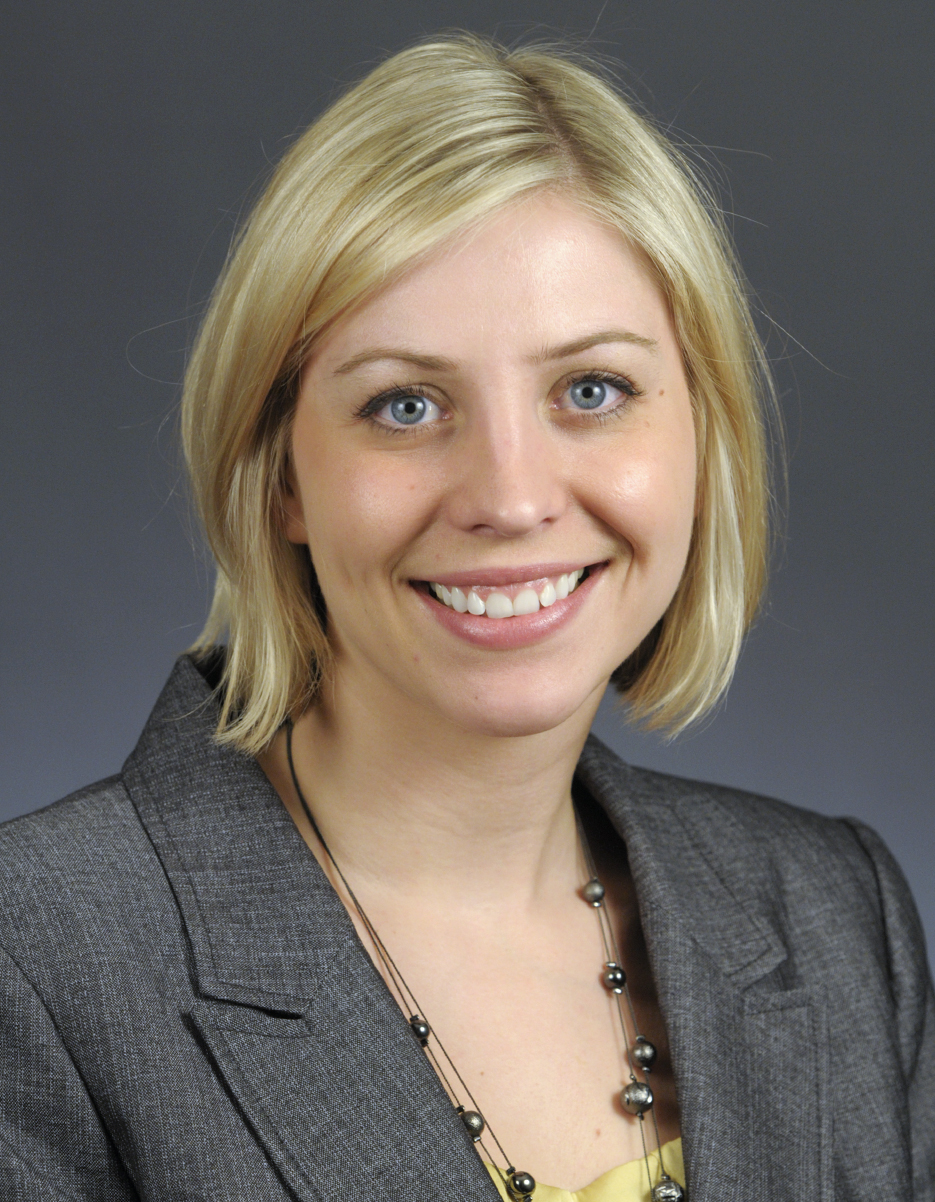

Member of the Minnesota House of Representatives from the 6A district 5B (2011–2013)
- In office February 22, 2011 – January 2, 2017
- Preceded by: Tony Sertich
- Succeeded by: Julie Sandstede

Personal details
- Born: August 13, 1985 (age 41) Hibbing, Minnesota, U.S.
- Party: Democratic
- Children: 3
- Education: Bemidji State University (BS); Hamline University (JD)
- Occupation: Lawyer

Carly Melin (born August 13, 1985) is a Minnesota politician and former member of the Minnesota House of Representatives. A member of the Minnesota Democratic–Farmer–Labor Party (DFL), she represented District 6A, which included portions of the Iron Range in Itasca and St. Louis counties in northeastern Minnesota. In February 2018, Melin became executive director of the Minnesota State Building and Construction Trades Council, a labor group representing 70,000 union members. On January 31, 2019, Attorney General Keith Ellison appointed Melin as government affairs director for his office.

== Early life, education, and career ==
Melin attended Hibbing High School in Hibbing, Minnesota. She received a B.S. in political science magna cum laude from Bemidji State University and a J.D. from Hamline University School of Law in Saint Paul, Minnesota. After graduating, she returned to the Iron Range to practice law, accepting a position with the Minnesota State Judiciary.

== Minnesota House of Representatives ==
Melin won a special election held on February 15, 2011, to fill the vacancy that arose after Governor Mark Dayton appointed Representative Tony Sertich commissioner of the Iron Range Resources and Rehabilitation Board. She was reelected in 2012 and 2014, but did not seek reelection in 2016, citing a desire to spend more time raising her two sons.

== Post-House of Representatives career ==
In February 2018, Melin became executive director of the Minnesota State Building and Construction Trades Council, a labor group representing 70,000 union members. On January 31, 2019, Attorney General Keith Ellison appointed Melin as government affairs director for his office.

In 2021, Melin was hired as the DFL chief of staff for the Minnesota Senate by Melisa López Franzen. She left the chief of staff position in early 2024 before the start of the legislative session. Melin settled with the Minnesota Senate for $110,000 over claims that Melin was discriminated against due to her husband's political activities. Her husband, Joe Radinovich, worked for the mayor of Minneapolis, Jacob Frey, and managed the political campaign of Don Samuels. Despite the settlement payment, the Minnesota Senate denied any wrongdoing or that any discrimination took place.

== Personal life ==
Melin married her high school sweetheart Zeb Norenberg on June 8, 2013. They have two sons. Melin and Norenberg divorced in 2017. Melin met former state representative Joe Radinovich while in office and they announced their engagement in July 2018. Melin and Radinovich have since married and welcomed a daughter.
