= Dale Lueck =

American politician (born 1949)

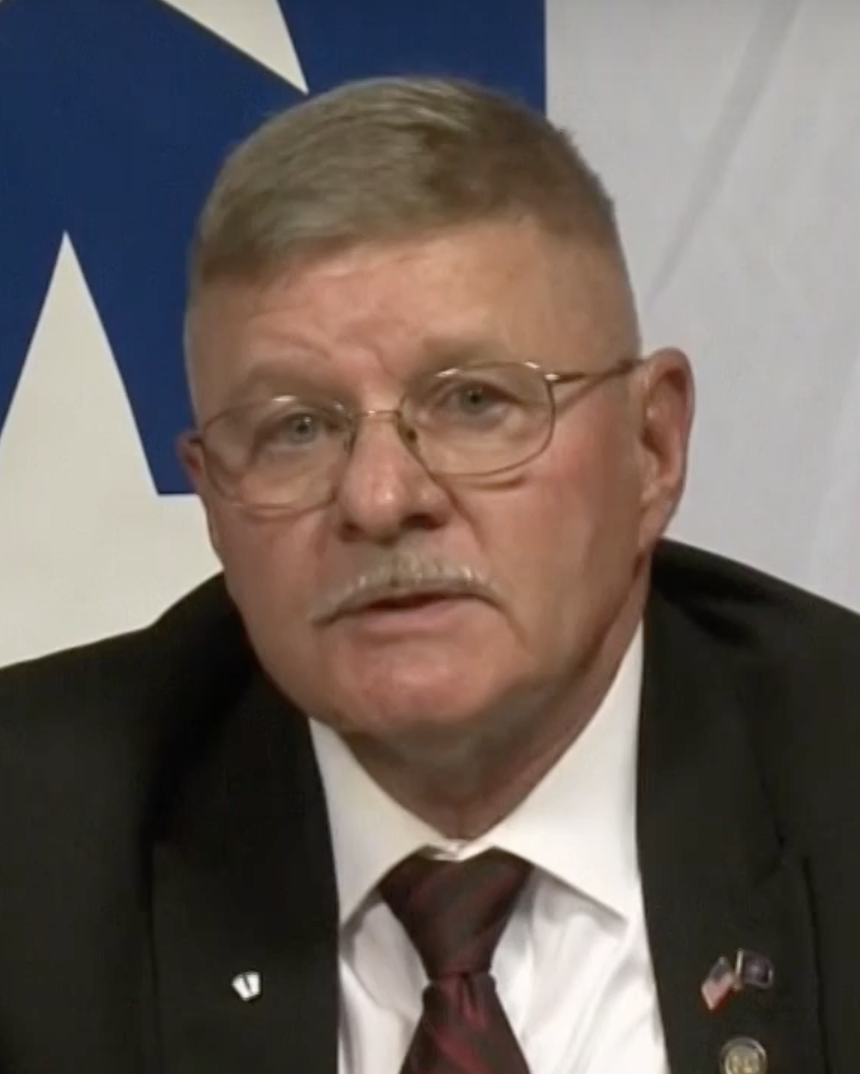

Member of the Minnesota House of Representatives from the 10B district
- Incumbent
- Assumed office January 6, 2015
- Preceded by: Joe Radinovich

Personal details
- Born: October 30, 1949 (age 76) Aitkin, Minnesota
- Party: Republican Party of Minnesota
- Spouse: Linda Gunderson
- Children: 2
- Education: National University (California)
- Occupation: small business owner legislator

Military service
- Allegiance: United States of America
- Branch/service: United States Navy
- Years of service: 1968–1997
- Rank: Commander

Dale Keith Lueck (born October 30, 1949) is an American politician and member of the Minnesota House of Representatives. A member of the Republican Party of Minnesota, he represents District 10B, which includes all of Aitkin County and part of Crow Wing County in central Minnesota.

== Early life ==
Lueck was born in Aitkin, Minnesota, to Fritz & Louise Lueck. Lueck grew up on the farm, doing work (1959-1968) with the cows, hay bales, and driving tractor. In 1965 he started working at Direct Service Gas Station where he was a Service Station Attendant until 1966. In 1966, he started working at Aitkin Iron Works as a Welding & Machinist Apprentice until 1968. Lueck graduated from Aitkin High School in 1968.

== Naval service ==
In 1968, Lueck enlisted in the United States Navy as a fireman recruit. He advanced through the enlisted ranks to Master Chief Petty Officer (paygrade (E-9). Concurrent with enlisted service, he was commissioned as a Mustang Officer. He was augmented to Unrestricted Line Special Operations Officer (1140) and attained the rank of Commander (paygrade 0-5). Lueck retired from Naval Service in 1997. His last Navy assignment, was as US Navy Supervisor of Diving, Naval Sea Systems Command, Washington, D.C.

== Education and post-military career ==
In 1984, Lueck got a B.S. in Occupational Health and Safety. He also got a B.B.A. in Information Systems. In 1997, Lueck started a Beef Cattle Operation called, Nordland Cattle & Timber Company. In 2001, he started a newspaper publication, MN Cattleman Publications. Lueck was elected as a County Commissioner of Aitkin County for 2 terms. As Commissioner, he served on the Aitkin County Forest Advisory Committee, Aitkin County UMN Extension Committee, a member of the Association of Minnesota Counties Agriculture Task Force, and as Commissioner of the Aitkin County Housing and Rehabilitation Authority. He also served as a member of the Mille Lac’s Watershed Committee, Northeast Solid Waste Advisory Group, and Director of the Arrowhead Economic Opportunity Agency.

== Minnesota House of Representatives ==
=== Elections ===
Lueck was elected on November 4, 2014 defeating the incumbent Rep. Joe Radinovich (DFL) by 3.86% or 686 votes.

2014 Minnesota State Representative- House 10B
Party	Candidate	Votes	%	±%
Democratic (DFL)	Joe Radinovich (Incumbent)	8523	48.00	
Republican	Dale Lueck	9209	51.86	

=== Tenure ===
Lueck was sworn in on January 6, 2015.

=== Committee assignments ===
For the 91st Legislative Session, Lueck is a part of:

- Environment and Natural Resources Policy (Republican lead)
- Agriculture and Food Finance and Policy Division
- Environment and Natural Resources Finance Division

== Personal life ==
In 1969, Lueck married his wife, Linda Gunderson. They have two children, Lance and Lisa. They also have four grandchildren. Lueck is a member of Bethlehem Lutheran Church where he was on the Church Council & Stewardship Committee. Lueck is a member of other organizations, including the Minnesota State Cattlemen’s Association, Minnesota and American Farm Bureau, Minnesota Deer Hunters Association, Minnesota Trappers Association, National Cattlemen’s Beef Association, American Legion - Aitkin Lee Post 86, Veteran of Foreign Wars (VFW) Post 1727, National Rifle Association, and the Fleet Reserve Association.

Minnesota House of Representatives
Preceded by Joe Radinovich	Member of the House of Representatives from District 10B; 2015–present	Incumbent
