= Pete Stauber =

American hockey player and politician (born 1966)

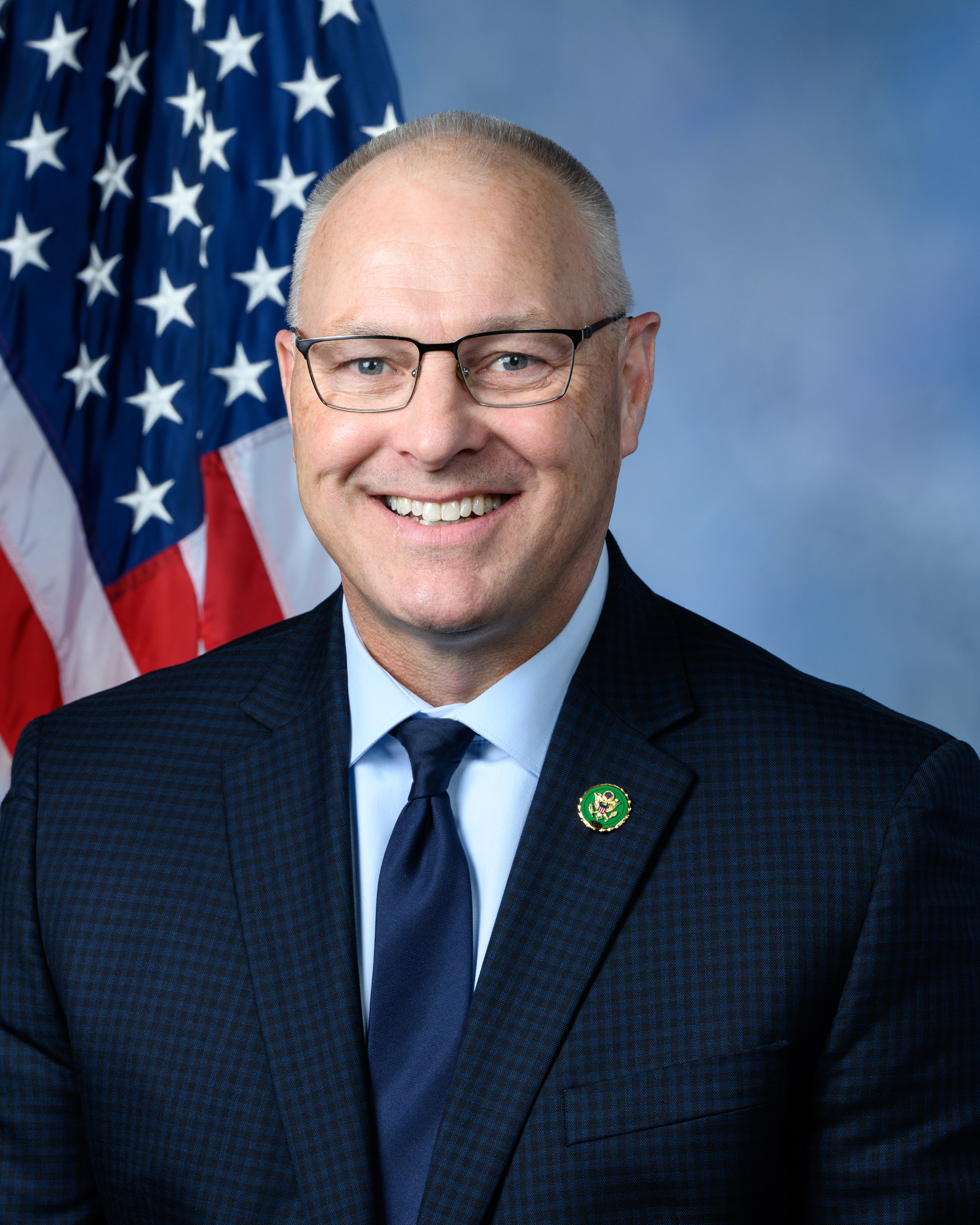

Member of the U.S. House of Representatives from Minnesota's 8th district
- Incumbent
- Assumed office January 3, 2019
- Preceded by: Rick Nolan

Member of the St. Louis County Commission from the 5th district
- In office January 1, 2013 – January 3, 2019
- Preceded by: Peg Sweeney
- Succeeded by: Keith Musolf

Personal details
- Born: Peter Allen Stauber; May 10, 1966 (age 60) Duluth, Minnesota, U.S.
- Party: Republican
- Spouse: Jodi Stauber
- Children: 6
- Relatives: Dan Stauber (brother); Robb Stauber (brother)
- Education: Lake Superior State University (BA)
- Website: House website Campaign website
Ice hockey career
- Height: 5 ft 11 in (180 cm)
- Weight: 190 lb (86 kg; 13 st 8 lb)
- Position: Left wing
- Shot: Left
- Played for: Adirondack Red Wings; Toledo Storm
- Playing career: 1990–1993
- Police career
- Department: Duluth Police Department
- Service years: 1995–2017
- Rank: Lieutenant
- Stauber's voice Stauber on the death of U.S. Representative Don Young. Recorded March 29, 2022

Peter Allen Stauber (born May 10, 1966) is an American politician, former minor-league hockey player, and retired law enforcement officer from Minnesota serving as the United States representative for Minnesota's 8th congressional district. A member of the Republican Party, Stauber has represented the district since 2019.

Stauber was born and grew up in Duluth, Minnesota. He played college hockey for Lake Superior State University, where, as a star player, he led the Lakers to a national championship in the 1988 NCAA Division I Men's Ice Hockey Tournament. Stauber met his political idol, President Ronald Reagan, when the team visited the White House after winning the championship. He later said this event kindled his political ambition. Stauber then had a brief career in minor-league hockey before serving as a lieutenant in the Duluth Police Department from 1995 to 2017. During his service as a police officer, he was shot while on duty. He also served as a county commissioner in St. Louis County, Minnesota, from 2013 to 2019.

Stauber defeated Democratic nominee Joe Radinovich in the 2018 United States House of Representatives elections. Representing a working-class and mostly rural district, he is only the second Republican to represent his district since 1947.

== Early life and education ==
Stauber was born on May 10, 1966, in Duluth, Minnesota. His brother Robb played in the National Hockey League (NHL). Stauber attended Denfeld High School in Duluth and graduated from Lake Superior State University with a bachelor's degree in criminology.

== Hockey career ==
=== College ===
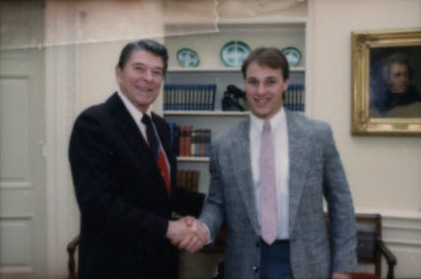
Stauber with President Reagan

Stauber was a star player for the Lake Superior State Lakers. He is credited with helping lead the Lakers to victory in the playoffs and the 1988 NCAA Division I Men's Ice Hockey Championship game. Lake Superior "became the smallest school ever to win college hockey's biggest prize." In that game, Stauber took a critical shot that opinion columnist Mike Mullen called "risky, arguably crafty, and inarguably illegal" and of which Star Tribune sportswriter John Gilbert wrote, "Pete Stauber got away undetected when he straight-armed the net off its moorings during a Saints rush with 1:23 to go in regulation."

After winning the national championship, the team was invited to the White House, where Stauber met President Ronald Reagan, an event he has called pivotal in kindling his interest in politics.

=== Minor leagues ===
In 1990, Stauber signed a multi-year contract with the Detroit Red Wings. He played three seasons with affiliate club Adirondack Red Wings in the American Hockey League (AHL) and 25 regular-season games with the Toledo Storm in the ECHL, including a Riley Cup playoff run during the 1991–92 season. The Florida Panthers selected him from the Red Wings in the 1993 NHL expansion draft, but due to a longstanding neck injury, he announced his retirement and joined the Duluth Police Department, where he served for 23 years.

=== Career statistics ===
==== Youth, collegiate, and minor-league ====
			Regular season					Playoffs
Season	Team	League	GP	G	A	Pts	PIM	GP	G	A	Pts	PIM
1984–85	Austin Mavericks	MWJHL	—	—	—	—	—	8	3	6	9	—
1985–86	Rochester Mustangs	MWJHL	46	40	28	68	58	—	—	—	—	—
1986–87	Lake Superior State University	WCHA	40	22	13	35	80	—	—	—	—	—
1987–88	Lake Superior State University	WCHA	45	25	33	58	103	—	—	—	—	—
1988–89	Lake Superior State University	WCHA	46	25	13	38	115	—	—	—	—	—
1989–90	Lake Superior State University	WCHA	46	25	31	56	90	—	—	—	—	—
1990–91	Adirondack Red Wings	USHL	26	7	11	18	2	—	—	—	—	—
1991–92	Adirondack Red Wings	USHL	25	2	5	7	14	—	—	—	—	—
1991–92	Toledo Storm	ECHL	25	7	21	28	46	5	2	3	5	46
1992–93	Adirondack Red Wings	USHL	12	2	2	4	8	—	—	—	—	—
WCHA totals			177	97	90	232	388	—	—	—	—	—
USHL totals			63	11	18	29	24	—	—	—	—	—

== U.S. House of Representatives ==
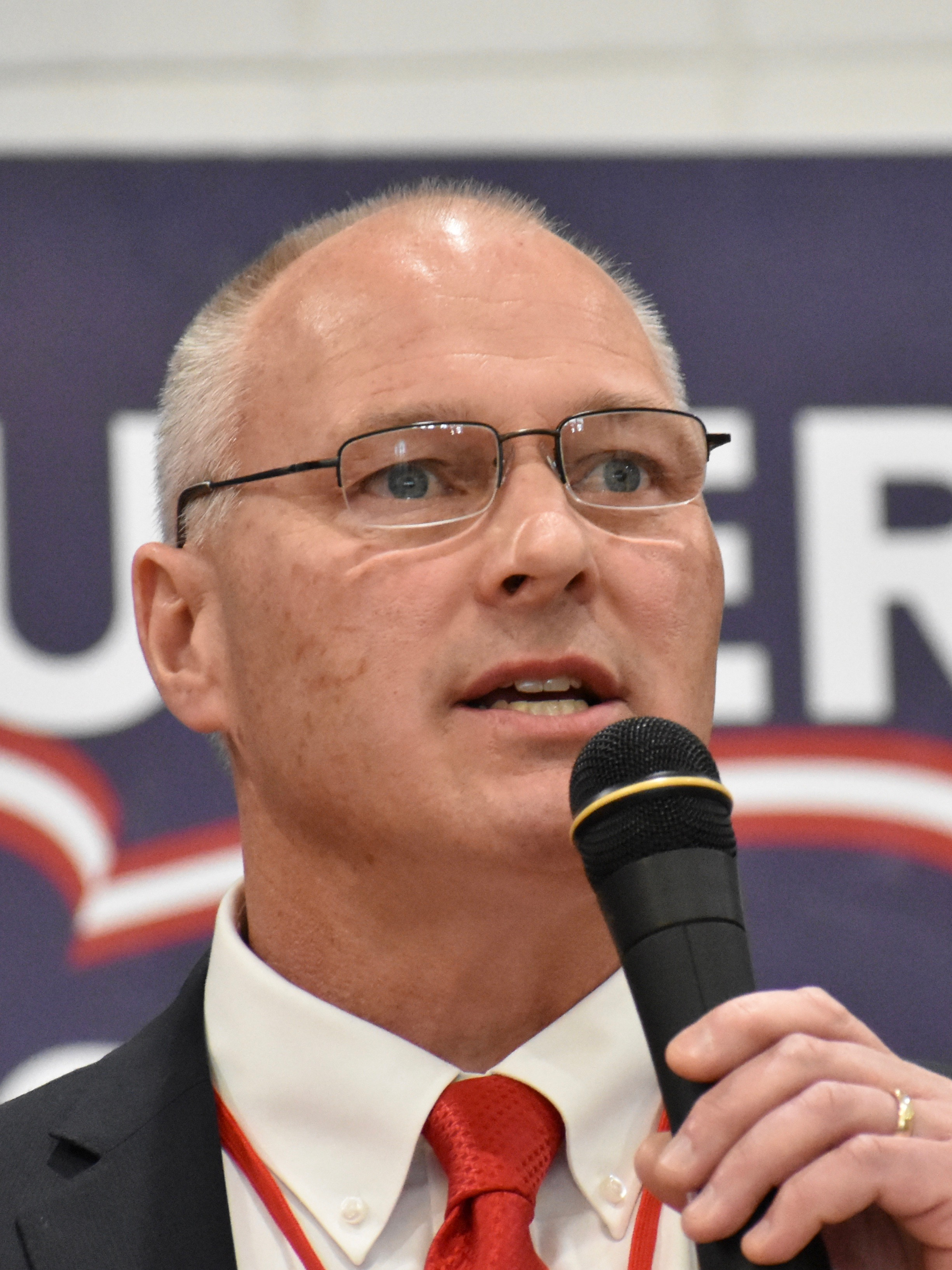
Stauber in 2018

=== Elections ===
==== 2018 ====
In June 2018, President Donald Trump campaigned for Stauber, making his first visit to Minnesota as president and attending his first rally to support a Republican candidate for the House of Representatives in the 2018 general election, visiting Stauber's hometown of Duluth. Stauber had served since 2013 as a member of the St. Louis County, Minnesota Commission (which includes Duluth). He had also served on the Hermantown City Council for eight years.

The 8th district had an open seat in a district where the last two elections were close. Partisan funders on both sides of the aisle reserved "millions" of dollars for advertising in a race widely regarded as a potential Republican pickup of a seat that had been held since 2013 by Rick Nolan. In November, Stauber defeated the DFL nominee, former Nolan aide Joe Radinovich, to become only the fifth person to represent the district in 71 years, and the second Republican to do so. He won primarily by running up his margins in the district's more conservative western portion.

During his 2018 campaign, Stauber ran on a policy of allowing Medicare to negotiate drug prices, becoming only one of a handful of Republicans to endorse what was primarily a progressive idea. He has since walked back from his campaign pledge.

==== 2020 ====
Stauber was reelected on November 4, 2020, defeating DFL nominee Quinn Nystrom, becoming the first Republican in 76 years to be reelected in the 8th district. In December 2020, he filed a motion to support Texas v. Pennsylvania, described as a "seditious abuse of the judicial process" and aimed at invalidating millions of votes in various swing states. The Duluth News Tribune, which had endorsed Stauber, and many other local officials sharply criticized him for the ploy in an open letter.

==== 2022 ====
Stauber was reelected on November 8, 2022, defeating DFL nominee Jennifer Schultz.

==== 2024 ====
Stauber was reelected on November 5, 2024, defeating Schultz in a rematch of the 2022 election.

=== Tenure ===
According to the McCourt School of Public Policy at Georgetown University, Stauber held a Bipartisan Index Score of 0.7 in the 116th United States Congress for 2019, which placed him 64th out of 435 members. Based on FiveThirtyEight's congressional vote tracker at ABC News, Stauber voted with Trump's stated public policy positions 90.4% of the time, which ranks him average in the 116th United States Congress when predictive scoring (district partisanship and voting record) is used.

On September 30, 2020, Stauber hosted Trump at a rally of about 3,000 people at the Duluth International Airport. Along with two of his Minnesota Republican House colleagues, Stauber rode with Trump on Air Force One. After it was determined that Stauber had interacted with people who tested positive for COVID-19 in Washington D.C., including Trump, Stauber took a Delta flight in violation of Delta's rules, potentially exposing the other passengers to the virus.

In December 2020, Stauber was one of 126 Republican members of the House of Representatives to sign an amicus brief in support of Texas v. Pennsylvania, a lawsuit filed at the United States Supreme Court contesting the results of the 2020 presidential election, in which Joe Biden defeated Trump. On January 6, 2021, Stauber voted to certify Biden's win in Arizona and Pennsylvania.

A group of Ojibwe tribes from Stauber's district rebuked him for his attempts to block President Biden's nomination of Deb Haaland as United States Secretary of the Interior. The Midwest Alliance of Sovereign Tribes also complained about his actions. A member of the House subcommittee on Indigenous Peoples, Stauber cited Haaland's support of the Green New Deal and opposition to oil drilling. As a member of the House, he did not vote on the nomination.

During the Speaker of the United States House of Representatives election in January 2023, Stauber consistently voted for Kevin McCarthy. In October 2023, he voted against removing McCarthy as speaker, which was unsuccessful and resulted in another election. Stauber backed Jim Jordan on the first ballot and Bruce Westerman on the next two ballots before voting for Mike Johnson on the fourth and final ballot. In December 2023, he was among the 105 Republicans who voted to expel George Santos from the House.

In April and May 2023, Stauber introduced a resolution and bill to end mineral withdrawal in Ely, Minnesota, as a response to a moratorium the Biden administration enacted the previous year. In April 2024, the House of Representatives passed Stauber's bill, 212–203. It was unlikely to pass the Democratic–controlled Senate, and the White House publicly opposed it. With the Republicans having secured a federal government trifecta, Stauber announced in January 2025 that he would reintroduce the bill.

In a January 2025 interview, Stauber said the Trump administration's federal government grant pause was acceptable. He justified it by citing wasteful spending, claiming millions of dollars had been spent on condoms in the Gaza Strip.

In 2026, Stauber invited Nick Shirley, a right-wing YouTuber known for creating videos making allegations of fraud at Somali-run child care centers in Minnesota, to the 2026 State of the Union Address.

=== Committee assignments ===
For the 119th Congress:

- Committee on Natural Resources
  - Subcommittee on Energy and Mineral Resources (Chair)
  - Subcommittee on Federal Lands
- Committee on Small Business
  - Subcommittee on Rural Development, Energy, and Supply Chains
- Committee on Transportation and Infrastructure
  - Subcommittee on Aviation
  - Subcommittee on Highways and Transit
  - Subcommittee on Railroads, Pipelines, and Hazardous Materials

=== Caucus memberships ===
- Law Enforcement Caucus
- Congressional Steel Caucus
- Congressional Motorcycle Caucus
- Congressional Western Caucus
- Congressional Sportsmen's Foundation
- Republican Main Street Partnership
- Republican Study Committee
- Republican Governance Group
- Problem Solvers Caucus (former)
- Congressional Coalition on Adoption

== Electoral history ==
Republican primary results, 2018
Party	Candidate	Votes	%
Republican	Pete Stauber	44,814	89.9
Republican	Harry Welty	5,021	10.1
Total votes		49,835	100.0

Minnesota's 8th congressional district, 2018
Party	Candidate	Votes	%
Republican	Pete Stauber	159,364	50.7
Democratic (DFL)	Joe Radinovich	141,948	45.2
Independence	Ray "Skip" Sandman	12,741	4.0
n/a	Write-ins	156	0.1
Total votes		314,209	100.0
Republican gain from Democratic (DFL)			

Minnesota's 8th congressional district, 2020
Party	Candidate	Votes	%
Republican	Pete Stauber (incumbent)	223,432	56.7
Democratic (DFL)	Quinn Nystrom	147,853	37.6
Grassroots	Judith Schwartzbacker	22,190	5.6
Write-in		236	0.1
Total votes		393,711	100.0
Republican hold			

Minnesota's 8th congressional district, 2022
Party	Candidate	Votes	%
Republican	Pete Stauber (incumbent)	188,755	57.2
Democratic (DFL)	Jennifer Schultz	141,009	42.7
Write-in		316	0.1
Total votes		330,080	100.0
Republican hold			

Minnesota's 8th congressional district, 2024
Party	Candidate	Votes	%
Republican	Pete Stauber (incumbent)	244,498	58.0
Democratic (DFL)	Jennifer Schultz	176,724	41.9
Write-in		384	0.1
Total votes		421,606	100.0
Republican hold			

== Personal life ==
Of German ancestry, Stauber lives in Hermantown, where he and his family belong to the St. Lawrence Catholic Church. His wife, Jodi, is an Iraq War veteran and the first female Command Chief of the 148th Fighter Wing. The couple have six children. Their eldest son, Levi, played as a forward for the Michigan Tech Huskies.

His brother Robb coached the United States women's national ice hockey team for eight years, first as an assistant and later as head coach. In that latter role, he coached the team to a gold medal at the 2017 IIHF Women's World Championship. The next year, he coached the team to a gold medal at the 2018 Winter Olympics

Stauber and his brothers run the Stauber Brothers Military Heroes Hockey Camp, a summer program for children with parents in the military. The six co-own the Duluth Hockey Company, which began as a sporting goods retailer but since 2015 has specialized in hockey-related merchandise. During the COVID-19 pandemic, the company received over $86,000 in relief funds from the Paycheck Protection Program.

One of his sons has Down syndrome, and Stauber has advocated for continuing medical research into the disorder. In 2023, he received the Quincy Jones Exceptional Advocacy Award from the Global Down Syndrome Foundation.

While on police duty in 1995, Stauber was shot and lightly wounded in the head when a bullet entered his squad car.

U.S. House of Representatives
Preceded by Rick Nolan	Member of the U.S. House of Representatives from Minnesota's 8th congressional district 2019–present	Incumbent
Party political offices
Preceded by Rodney Davis	Chair of the Republican Main Street Caucus; 2021–2023; Served alongside: Don Bacon, Mike Bost	Succeeded by Dusty Johnson
U.S. order of precedence (ceremonial)
Preceded by Greg Stanton	United States representatives by seniority 226th	Succeeded by Bryan Steil
