= Ilhan Omar =

American politician (born 1982)

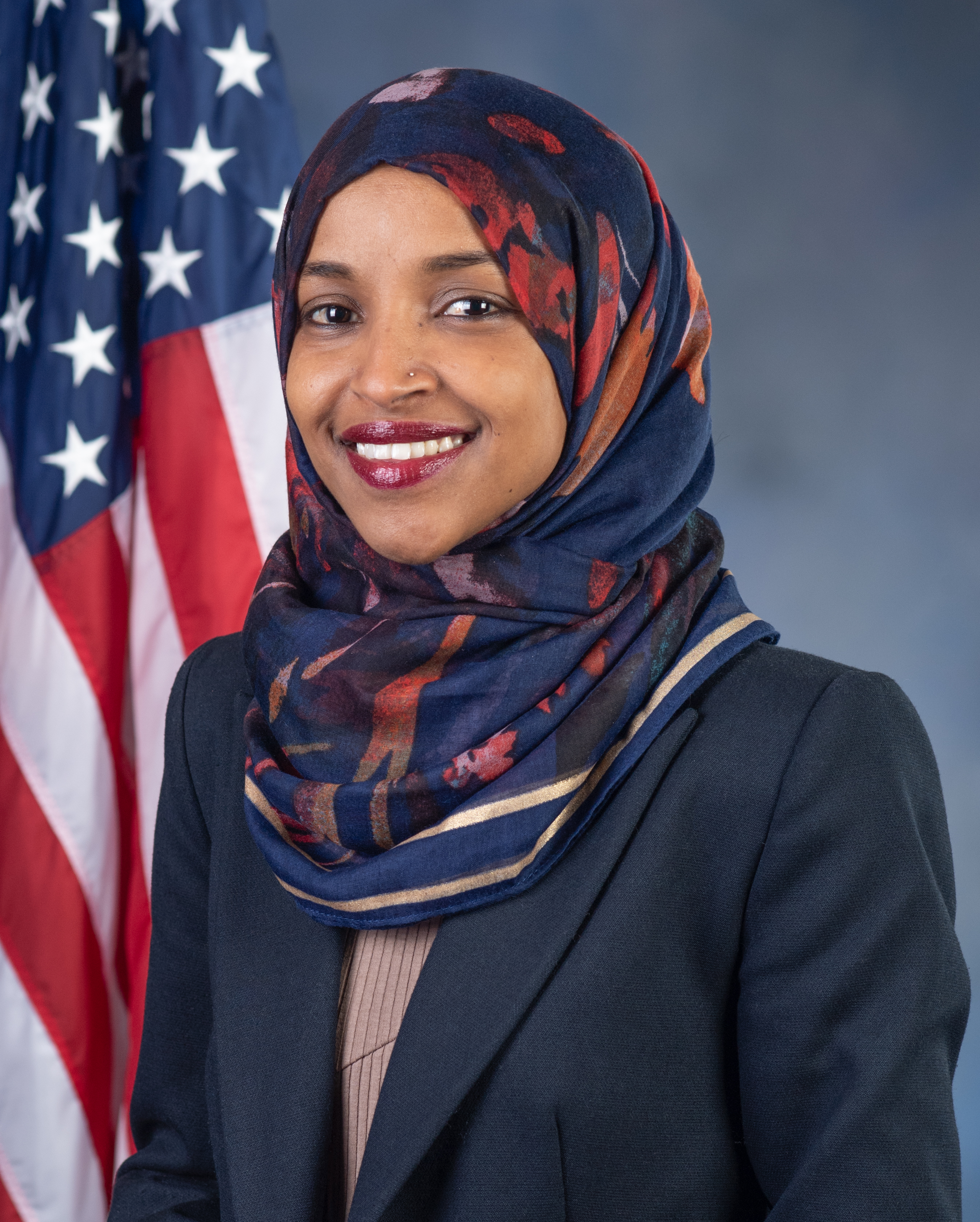
- Official portrait, 2019

Member of the U.S. House of Representatives from Minnesota's 5th district
- Incumbent
- Assumed office January 3, 2019
- Preceded by: Keith Ellison

Member of the Minnesota House of Representatives from the 60B district
- In office January 2, 2017 – January 3, 2019
- Preceded by: Phyllis Kahn
- Succeeded by: Mohamud Noor

Personal details
- Born: Ilham Abdullahi Omar; October 4, 1982 (age 44) Mogadishu, Somali Democratic Republic
- Citizenship: United States (2000–present)
- Party: Democratic (DFL)
- Spouses: Ahmed Nur Said Elmi (m. 2009; div. 2017) (Note: Omar has said that she and Elmi had a faith-based divorce in 2011, and remained legally married until 2017.); Ahmed Abdisalan Hirsi (m. 2018; div. 2019) (Note: Omar has said that she and Hirsi had a faith-based marriage in 2002 and a faith-based divorce in 2008, before reconciling in 2012 and getting legally married in 2018. Their divorce was finalized on November 5, 2019.); Tim Mynett (m. 2020)
- Children: 3, including Isra Hirsi
- Education: North Dakota State University (BA)
- Website: House website; Campaign website
- Omar's voice Omar on her reelection and increased diversity after the 2022 Minnesota state elections (Note: Recorded November 17, 2022.)

Ilhan Abdullahi Omar (born October 4, 1982) is an American politician serving as the U.S. representative for Minnesota's 5th congressional district since 2019. The district includes all of Minneapolis and some of its first-ring suburbs. From 2017 to 2019, Omar served in the Minnesota House of Representatives, representing part of Minneapolis. She is a member of the Democratic Party.

Omar is the first Somali American in the United States Congress and the first woman of color to represent Minnesota. She and Rashida Tlaib, who was also elected to the House in 2018, are the first two Muslim women to serve in Congress. Her political opponents, including Donald Trump, have made derogatory comments related to her background. She has also received several death threats.

A progressive Democrat, Omar serves as deputy chair of the Congressional Progressive Caucus and has advocated for a $15 minimum wage, universal healthcare, student loan debt forgiveness, the protection of Deferred Action for Childhood Arrivals, and abolishing U.S. Immigration and Customs Enforcement (ICE).

A frequent critic of Israel, Omar supports the Boycott, Divestment and Sanctions (BDS) movement and has denounced Israel's settlement policies and military campaigns in the occupied Palestinian territories, as well as the influence of pro-Israel lobbies in U.S. politics. In February 2023, the Republican-controlled House voted to remove Omar from her seat on the Foreign Affairs Committee, arguing that comments she had made about Israel showed she could not be "an objective decision-maker".

== Early life and education ==
Omar was born in Mogadishu, Somali Democratic Republic. Her birth date is given as October 4, 1982, in the Biographical Directory of the United States Congress and the Minnesota Legislative Reference Library. The Library reports that her birth year was earlier given incorrectly as 1981, and that the Library and the US House worked to change it in 2019 at the request of Omar's congressional staff.

Omar spent her early years in Baidoa, in southern Somalia. Her father named her Ilham, meaning "inspiration" in Arabic. She was the youngest of seven siblings. Her father is Nur Omar Mohamed, an ethnic Somali from the Osman Mohamud sub-clan of Majeerteen, a clan in northeastern Somalia. He was a colonel in the Somali Army under Siad Barre, and served in the Ogaden War (1977–78). He also worked as a teacher trainer.

Omar's mother, Fadhuma Abukar Haji Hussein, an ethnic Benadiri, died when Omar was two. Omar was raised by her father and grandfather, who were moderate Sunni Muslims opposed to the rigid Wahhabi interpretation of Islam. Her grandfather Abukar was the director of Somalia's National Marine Transport, and some of Omar's uncles and aunts also worked as civil servants and educators. She and her family fled Somalia to escape the Somali Civil War and spent four years in a Dadaab refugee camp in Garissa County, Kenya.

Omar's family secured asylum in the U.S. and arrived in New York in 1995, then lived for a time in Arlington, Virginia, before moving to and settling in Minneapolis, where her father worked first as a taxi driver and later for the post office. Her father and grandfather emphasized the importance of democracy during her upbringing, and at age 14 she accompanied her grandfather to caucus meetings, serving as his interpreter. She has spoken about school bullying she endured during her time in Virginia, stimulated by her distinctive Somali appearance and wearing of the hijab. She recalls gum being pressed into her hijab, being pushed down stairs, and physical taunts while she was changing for gym class. Omar remembers her father's reaction to these incidents: "They are doing something to you because they feel threatened in some way by your existence." Omar became a U.S. citizen in 2000 when she was 17 years old.

Omar attended Thomas Edison High School, from which she graduated in 2001, and volunteered as a student organizer. She graduated from North Dakota State University in 2011 with a bachelor's degree, majoring in political science and international studies. Omar was a policy fellow at the University of Minnesota's Humphrey School of Public Affairs.

== Early career ==
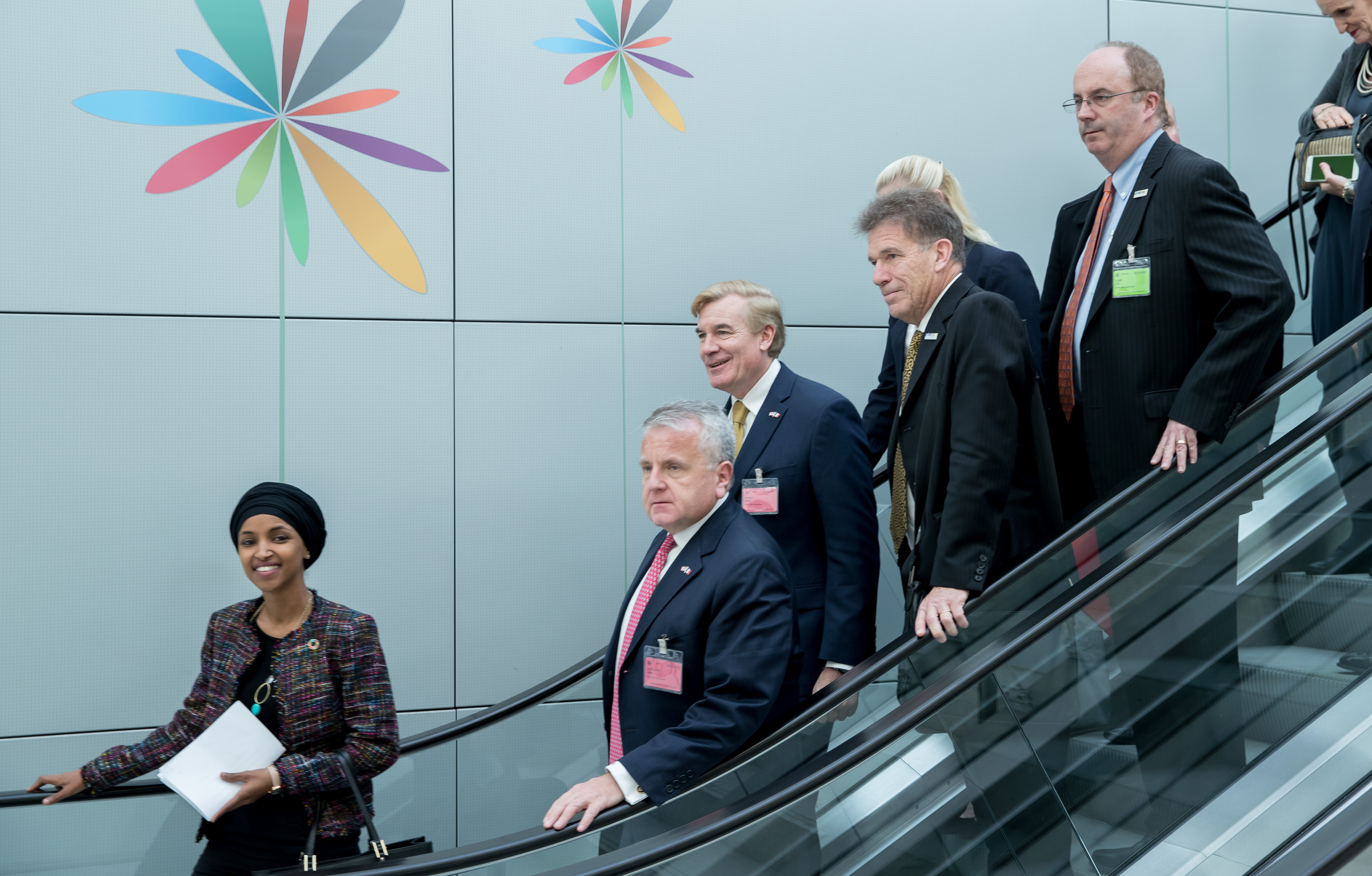
Omar with John Sullivan in Paris as part of Minnesota's World's Fair Bid Committee, 2017

Omar began her professional career as a community nutrition educator at the University of Minnesota, working in that capacity from 2006 to 2009 in the greater Minneapolis–Saint Paul area. In 2012, she served as campaign manager for Kari Dziedzic's reelection campaign for the Minnesota State Senate. Between 2012 and 2013, she was a child nutrition outreach coordinator at the Minnesota Department of Education.

In 2013, Omar managed Andrew Johnson's campaign for Minneapolis City Council. After Johnson was elected, she served as his senior policy aide from 2013 to 2015. In February 2014, during a contentious precinct caucus that turned violent, Omar was attacked by five people and injured. According to MinnPost, the day before the caucus, Minneapolis city council member Abdi Warsame had told Johnson to warn Omar not to attend the meeting.

As of September 2015, Omar was the Director of Policy Initiatives of the Women Organizing Women Network, advocating for women from East Africa to take on civic and political leadership roles. In September 2018, Jeff Cirillo of Roll Call called her a "progressive rising star".

== Minnesota House of Representatives ==
=== Elections ===
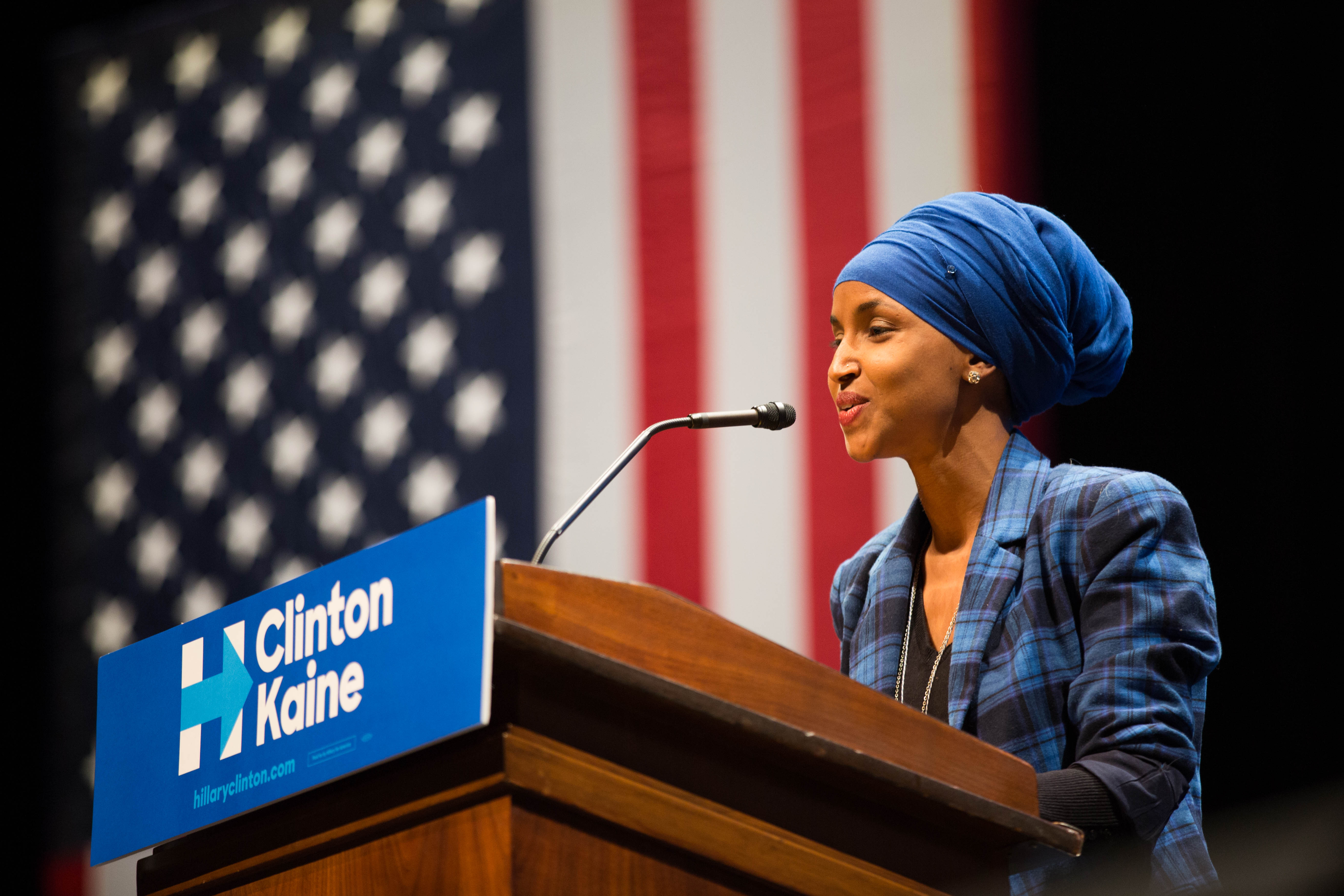
Omar, then a candidate for the Minnesota House of Representatives, speaks at a Hillary for Minnesota event at the University of Minnesota in October 2016.

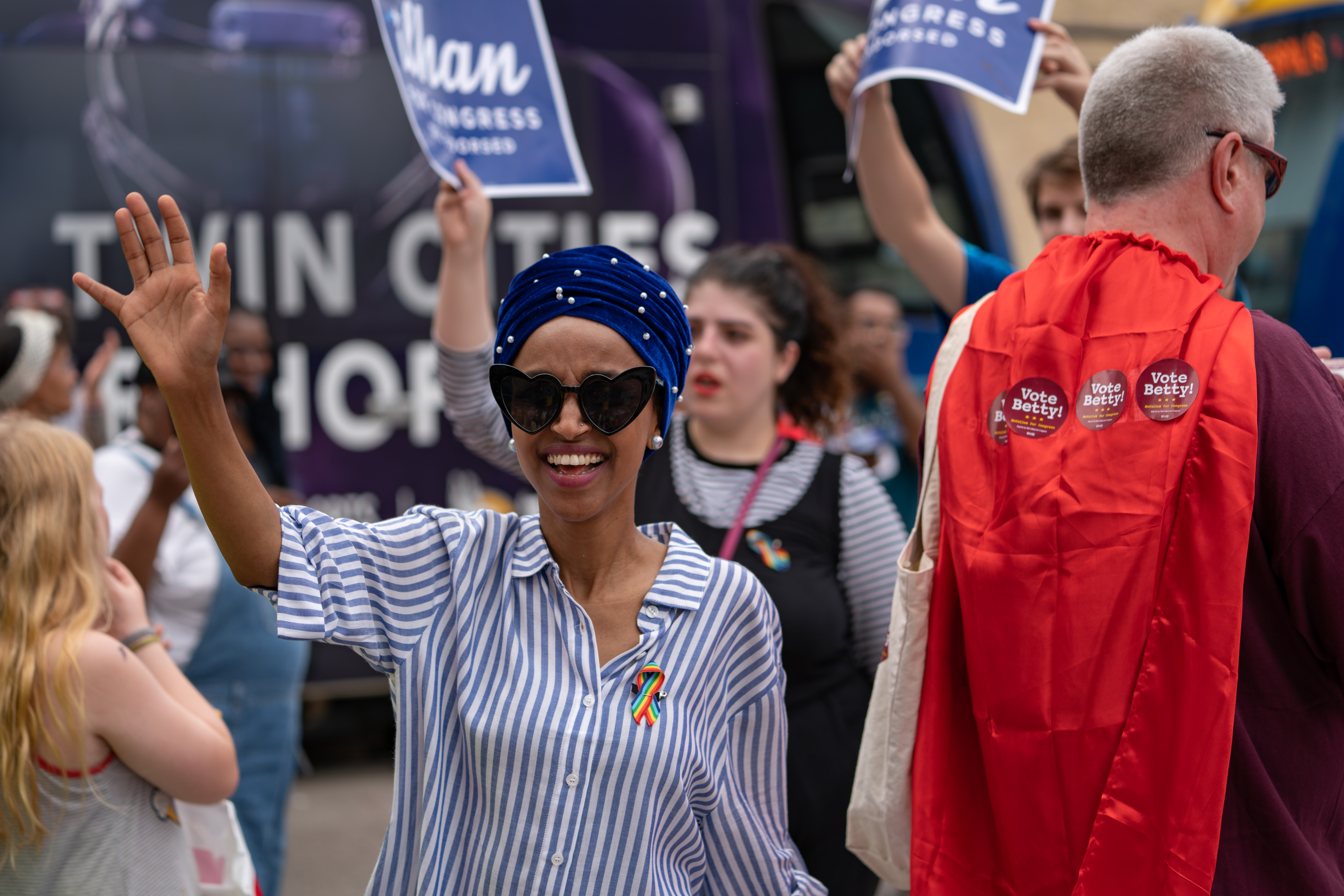
Omar at the Twin Cities Pride Parade in 2018

In 2016, Omar ran on the Democratic–Farmer–Labor (DFL) ticket for the Minnesota House of Representatives in District 60B, which includes part of northeast Minneapolis. On August 9, Omar defeated Mohamud Noor and incumbent Phyllis Kahn in the DFL primary. Her chief opponent in the general election was Republican nominee Abdimalik Askar, another activist in the Somali-American community. In late August, Askar announced his withdrawal from the campaign. In November, Omar won the general election, becoming the first Somali-American legislator in the United States. Her term began on January 3, 2017.

=== Tenure and activity ===
During her tenure as state representative for District 60B, Omar was an assistant minority leader for the DFL caucus. She authored 38 bills during the 2017–2018 legislative session.

=== Committee assignments ===
- Civil Law & Data Practices Policy
- Higher Education & Career Readiness Policy & Finance
- State Government Finance

=== Campaign finance investigations ===
In 2018, Republican state representative Steve Drazkowski publicly accused Omar of campaign finance violations, claiming that she used campaign funds to pay a divorce lawyer, and that her acceptance of speaking fees from public colleges violated Minnesota House rules. Omar responded that the attorney's fees were not personal but campaign-related; she offered to return the speaking fees. Drazkowski later accused Omar of improperly using campaign funds for personal travel to Estonia and locations in the U.S.

Omar's campaign dismissed the accusations as politically motivated and accused Drazkowski of using public funds to harass a Muslim candidate. In response to an editorial in the Minneapolis Star Tribune arguing that Omar should be more transparent about her use of campaign funds, she said: "these people are part of systems that have historically been disturbingly motivated to silence, discredit and dehumanize influencers who threaten the establishment."

In June 2019, Minnesota campaign finance officials ruled that Omar had to pay back $3,500 that she had spent on out-of-state travel and tax filing in violation of state law, plus a $500 fine. The Campaign Finance Board's investigation also found that, in 2014 and 2015, Omar had jointly filed taxes with a man to whom she was not legally married. Unlike some states, Minnesota does not recognize common-law marriage, and so such a joint filing is not legally permitted. But experts have said that if the taxpayer files a correction within three years, as Omar's attorney and accountants did in 2016, then there are normally no further consequences, and the Internal Revenue Service is unlikely to pursue punitive measures unless there is a large discrepancy or fraudulent intent. In response to the AP's request for comment, her campaign sent a statement saying, "all of Rep. Omar's tax filings are fully compliant with all applicable tax law."

== U.S. House of Representatives ==
=== Elections ===
==== 2018 ====
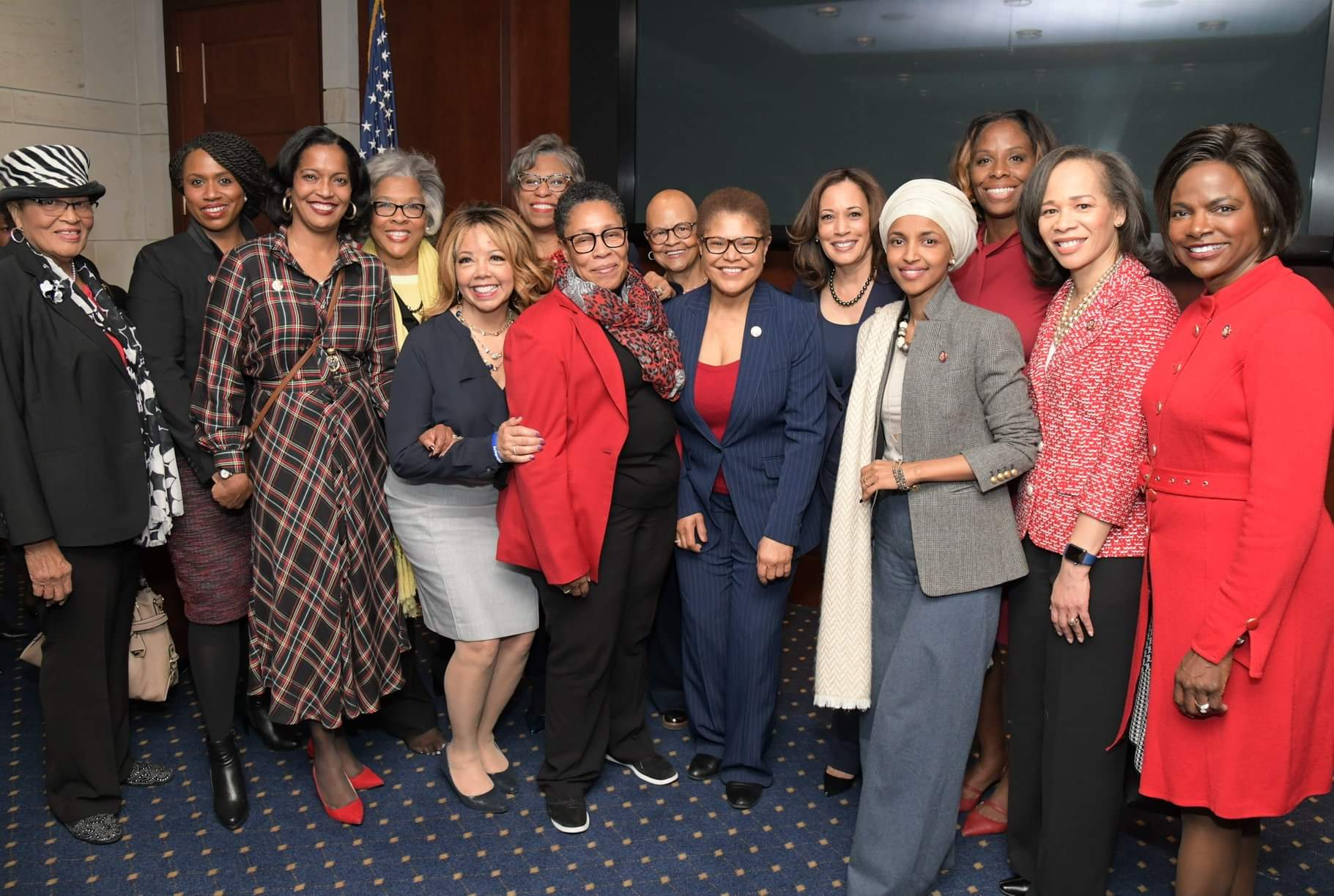
Omar and other female members of the Congressional Black Caucus in January 2019

On June 5, 2018, Omar filed to run for the United States House of Representatives from Minnesota's 5th congressional district after six-term incumbent Keith Ellison announced he would not seek reelection. On June 17, she was endorsed by the Minnesota Democratic–Farmer–Labor Party after two rounds of voting. Omar won the August 14 primary with 48.2% of the vote.

The 5th district is the most Democratic district in Minnesota and the Upper Midwest (it has a Cook Partisan Voting Index of D+26) and the DFL has held it since 1963. Omar faced health care worker and conservative activist Jennifer Zielinski in the November 6 general election and won with 78.0% of the vote, becoming the first Somali American elected to the U.S. Congress, the first woman of color to serve as a U.S. representative from Minnesota, and (alongside former Michigan state representative Rashida Tlaib) one of the first Muslim women elected to the Congress.

Omar received the largest percentage of the vote of any female candidate for U.S. House in state history, as well as the largest percentage for a non-incumbent U.S. House candidate (excluding those running against only minor-party candidates). She was sworn in on a copy of the Quran owned by her grandfather.

==== 2020 ====
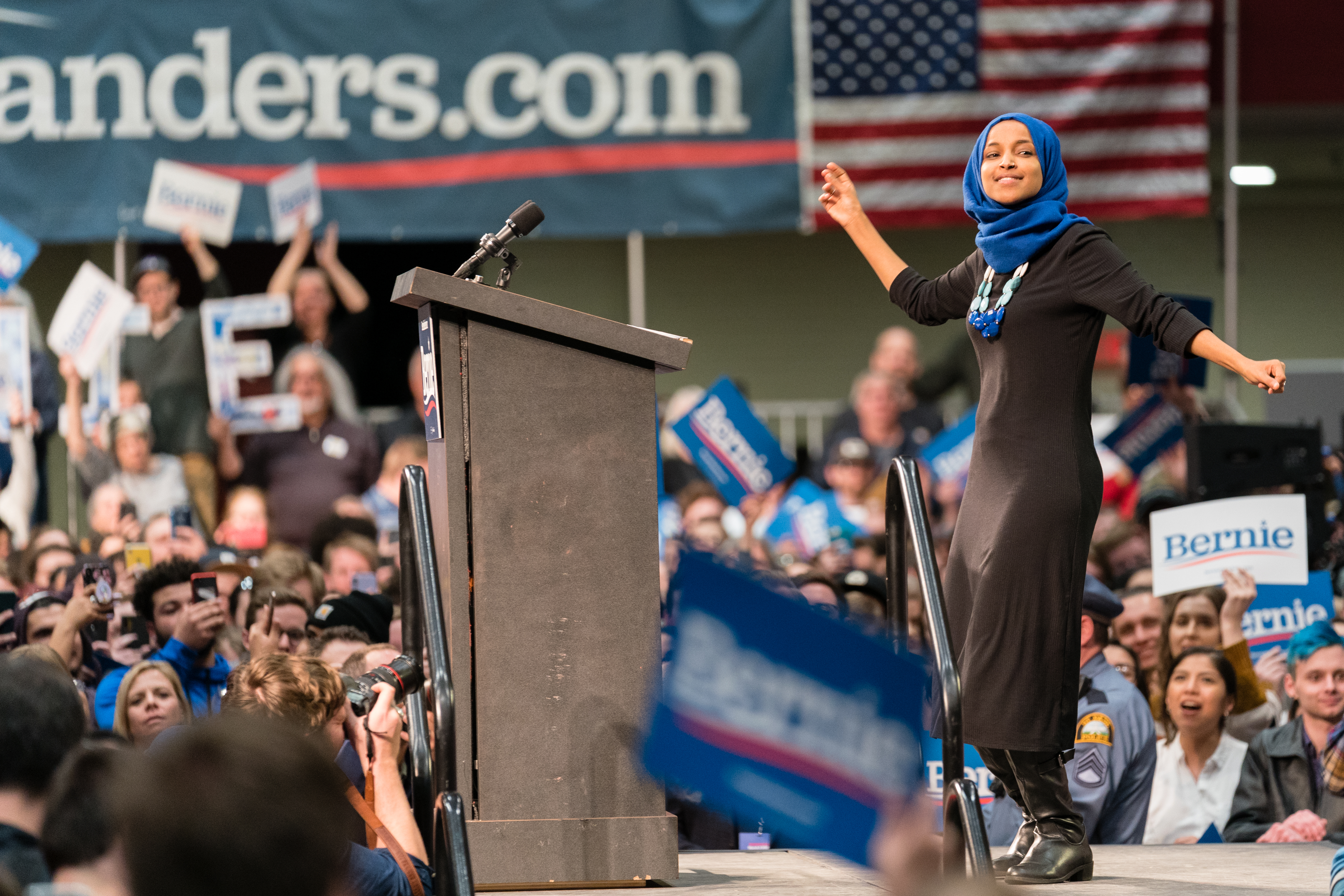
Omar at a presidential campaign rally for Bernie Sanders in 2020

Omar won the Democratic nomination in the August 11 Democratic primary, in which she faced four opponents. The strongest was mediation lawyer Antone Melton-Meaux, who raised $3.2 million in April–June 2020, compared to about $500,000 by Omar; much of Melton-Meaux's funding came from pro-Israel groups. Melton-Meaux was also endorsed by Minnesota's largest newspaper, The Star Tribune. This led some analysts to predict a close race, but Omar received 57.4% of the vote to Melton-Meaux's 39.2%.

She defeated Republican Lacy Johnson and Legal Marijuana Now Party candidate Michael Moore in the November 3 general election, with 64.3% of the vote to Johnson's 25.8% and Moore's 9.5%. Omar's margin of victory was 24 points less than Biden's in the district, the highest underperformance of any Democrat in the nation, which Nathaniel Rakich of FiveThirtyEight attributed to increased Republican spending and Moore's progressive pro-marijuana campaign.

==== 2022 ====
In the August 9 Democratic primary, Omar faced former Minneapolis councilman Don Samuels and three other opponents. The campaign primarily focused on crime and Omar's effectiveness in office. Omar's campaign outspent Samuels's by $2.1 million to $800,000; Samuels ran television ads while Omar's campaign did not. Omar won the primary with 50.3% of the vote to Samuels's 48.2%, a margin of fewer than 2,500 votes.

==== 2024 ====
Omar won the August 13 Democratic primary with 56% of the vote against Don Samuels, whom she defeated in the 2022 primary, Tim Peterson, and Sarah Gad. She was reelected to a fourth term with 75.3% of the vote.

=== Tenure ===
Following Omar's election, the ban on head coverings in the U.S. House was modified, and Omar became the first woman to wear a hijab on the House floor. She is a member of the informal group known as "The Squad", whose members form a unified front to push for progressive changes such as the Green New Deal and Medicare for All. The other members of the Squad are Ayanna Pressley, Rashida Tlaib, and Alexandria Ocasio-Cortez.

Brian Stelter of CNN Business found that from January to July 2019 Omar was mentioned about twice as often on Fox News as on CNN and MSNBC, and about six times as often as James Clyburn, a Democratic House leader. A CBS News and YouGov poll of almost 2,100 U.S. adults conducted from July 17 to 19 found that Republican respondents were more aware of Omar than Democratic respondents. Omar has very unfavorable ratings among Republican respondents and favorable ratings among Democratic respondents. The same is true of the other members of the Squad.

On September 10, 2025, Omar condemned the assassination of Charlie Kirk, saying, "political violence is completely unacceptable and indefensible." She called conservatives who blamed the left for the shooting "full of shit" and reposted a video calling Kirk a "stochastic terrorist" who "with his last dying words ... was spewing racist dogwhistles". This led to two Republican efforts to strip Omar of her committee assignments. One of them, led by Representative Nancy Mace, failed on September 17, 2025, with four Republicans joining all Democrats to kill the measure.

==== Legislation ====
In July 2019, Omar introduced a resolution co-sponsored by Rashida Tlaib and Georgia representative John Lewis supporting Americans' right to undertake human rights boycotts, and opposing legislation restricting such boycotts. In the same month, Omar was one of 17 members of Congress to vote against a House resolution condemning the movement to boycott, divest from, and sanction Israel.

On January 7, 2021, Omar led a group of 13 House members introducing articles of impeachment against Trump on charges of high crimes and misdemeanors. The charges are related to Trump's alleged interference in the 2020 presidential election in Georgia and incitement of the attack at the U.S. Capitol in Washington, D.C., by his supporters, which occurred during the certification of electoral votes in the 2020 presidential election that affirmed Joe Biden's victory.

In 2022, Omar urged the renewal of the MEALS Act, which provided free meals to 20–30 million children amid rising prices due to the Russo-Ukrainian war. Additionally, her sponsored piece of legislation, a bill to rename the central Minneapolis post office after former congressman Martin Olav Sabo, became law.

=== Committee assignments ===
For the 119th Congress:

- Committee on Education and the Workforce
  - Subcommittee on Health, Employment, Labor, and Pensions
  - Subcommittee on Workforce Protections (Ranking Member)
- Committee on the Budget

=== Caucuses ===
- Congressional Progressive Caucus deputy chair
- Black Maternal Health Caucus
- Congressional Black Caucus
- Congressional Caucus for the Equal Rights Amendment
- Congressional Equality Caucus

=== 2021 U.S. Capitol attack ===
After the 2021 United States Capitol attack, Omar said the experience was traumatizing. She said she began to fear for her life when the evacuation began, and as she was being escorted to a secure area, she telephoned her children's father to "make sure he would continue to tell my children that I loved them if I didn't make it out." Omar added: "The face of the Capitol will forever be changed. They didn't succeed in stopping the functions of democracy, but I do believe they succeeded in ending the openness of our democracy."

=== Financial disclosures ===
Omar reported a negative net worth when initially elected in 2018. She reported in her 2024 financial filing that she and her husband, Tim Mynett, had a household net worth between $6 million and $30 million at the end of 2024. Mynett and Omar's wealth derives almost entirely from his ownership stake in two companies, a California-based winery and a venture capital firm. Following the release of the 2024 filings, Omar tweeted in February 2025 that she is barely worth "thousands let alone millions".

== Immigration raid and investigation ==
On October 12, 2026, agents of the Homeland Security Investigations (HSI) unit executed a search warrant at Omar's DC home. Judge Matthew Sharbaugh of the DC District Court had granted the warrant but, because Omar is a member of Congress, limited access to her documents. The Department of Homeland Security has not publicly addressed the details of the warrant, but reports describe it as alleging irregularities in her and her family's immigration status stemming from paperwork her father filled out when she was a child. Homeland Security secretary Markwayne Mullin had described an "ongoing investigation" into Omar's immigration forms about a month earlier.

The search took place less than 60 days before the 2026 United States elections, a practice the Department of Justice has traditionally avoided. The New York Times wrote, "Democrats have loudly condemned [the search] as a political persecution and said it violates a Justice Department policy to avoid overt measures that could be seen as affecting the vote in the weeks before Election Day." The administration responded that a federal judge had signed the warrant; that there is no official policy regarding DOJ actions in proximity to elections, only that investigations not be pursued with the purpose of influencing their outcomes; and that prosecutors consulted the Public Integrity Section before taking investigatory actions, as DOJ policy requires.

Border czar Tom Homan confirmed that a raid took place but gave no details except that it concerned an "ongoing federal criminal investigation". Omar called the raid an attempt to "weaponize federal law enforcement". House Democratic leaders called the attack "deeply disturbing", saying it raised questions about the role of federal law enforcement in pursuing political ends. Minnesota governor Tim Walz criticized the search as "President Trump... abusing his power to go after political opponents weeks before an election".

On October 14, 2026, The Wall Street Journal reported that the goal of the search was to build a case to denaturalize and deport Omar. If Omar had been a minor at the time of her father's citizenship application, she would automatically get citizenship instead of being required to apply on her own as an adult. The raid renewed attention to previous listings of Omar's birth year as 1981 rather than 1982. On October 21, 2026, CNN reported that Omar's sister was among those interviewed, while The New York Times reported her sister's phone was seized before the raid.

== Political positions ==
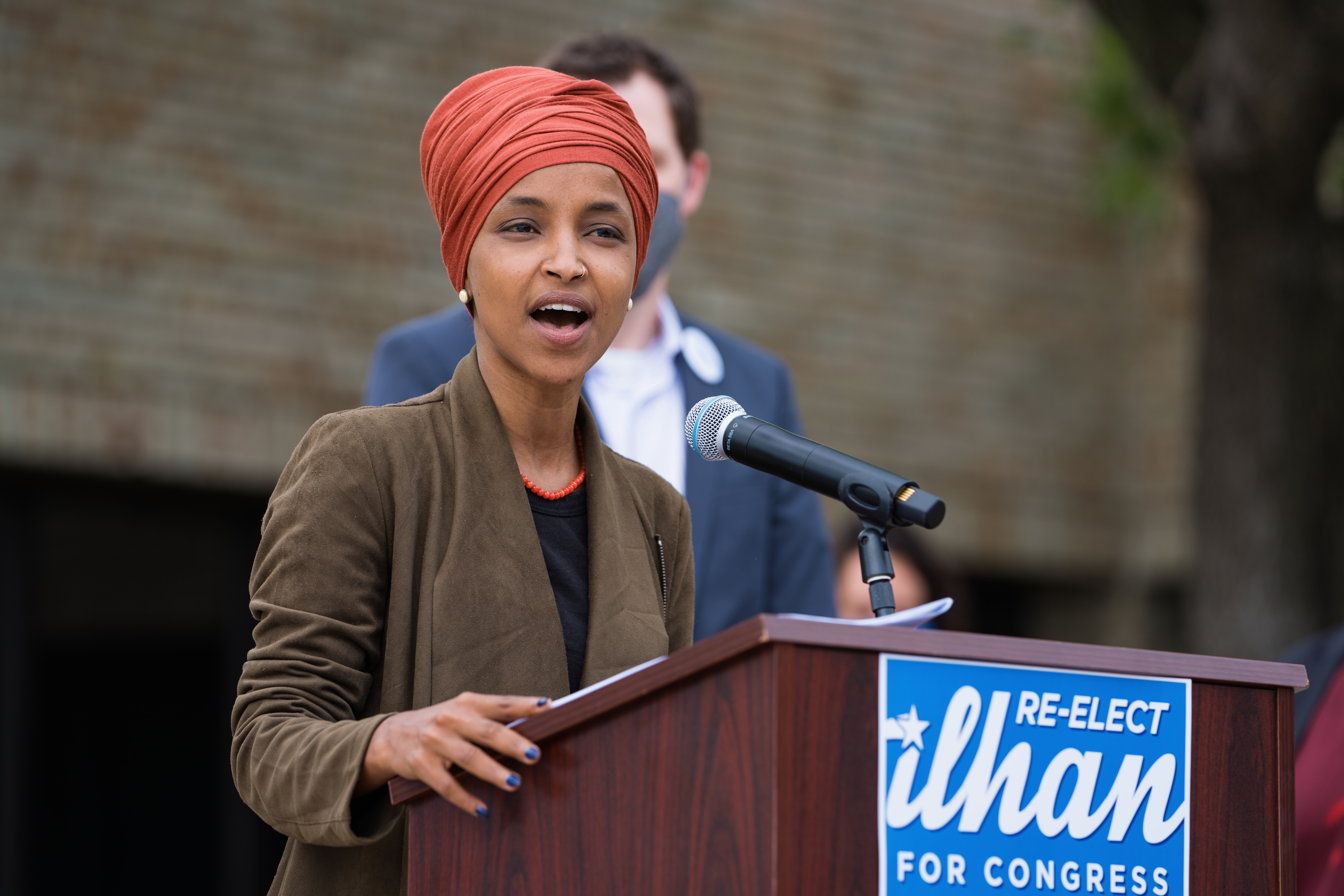
Omar speaking during her 2020 re-election campaign

=== Education ===
Omar supports broader access to student loan forgiveness programs, as well as free tuition for college students whose family income is below $125,000. Omar supports Bernie Sanders's plan to eliminate all $1.6 trillion in outstanding student debt, funded by an 0.5% tax on stock transactions and a 0.1% tax on bond transactions; she introduced a companion bill in the House of Representatives. In June 2019, Omar and Senator Tina Smith introduced the No Shame at School Act, which would end the marking of—and punishment for—students with school meal debt.

=== Health care ===
Omar supports Medicare for All as proposed in the Expanded and Improved Medicare for All Act.

On July 19, 2022, after the Supreme Court overruled Roe v. Wade in Dobbs v. Jackson Women's Health Organization, Omar and 17 other members of Congress were arrested in an act of civil disobedience for refusing to clear a street during a protest for reproductive rights outside the Supreme Court Building.

=== Foreign affairs ===
Omar has criticized Saudi Arabia's human rights abuses and the Saudi-led intervention in the Yemeni civil war. In October 2018, she tweeted: "The Saudi government might have been strategic at covering up the daily atrocities carried out against minorities, women, activists and even the #YemenGenocide, but the murder of Jamal Khashoggi should be the last evil act they are allowed to commit." She also called for a boycott of Saudi Arabia's regime, tweeting: "#BDSSaudi." The Saudi Arabian government responded by having dozens of anonymous Twitter troll accounts it controlled post tweets critical of Omar.

Omar condemned China's treatment of its ethnic Uyghur people. In a Washington Post op-ed, Omar wrote, "Our criticisms of oppression and regional instability caused by Iran are not legitimate if we do not hold Egypt, the United Arab Emirates and Bahrain to the same standards. And we cannot continue to turn a blind eye to repression in Saudi Arabia—a country that is consistently ranked among the worst of the worst human rights offenders." She also condemned the Assad regime in Syria. Omar criticized Trump's decision to impose further sanctions on Iran, saying the sanctions devastated the "country's middle class and increased hostility toward the United States, with tensions between the two countries rising to dangerous levels."

Omar opposed the October 2019 Turkish offensive into north-eastern Syria, writing, "What has happened after Turkey's invasion of northeastern Syria is a disaster—tens of thousands of civilians have been forced to flee, hundreds of Islamic State fighters have escaped, and Turkish-backed rebels have been credibly accused of atrocities against the Kurds."

In October 2019, Omar voted "present" on H.Res. 296, to recognize the Armenian genocide, causing a backlash. She said in a statement that "accountability and recognition of genocide should not be used as cudgel in a political fight" and argued that such a step should include both the Atlantic slave trade and the Native American genocide. In November, after her controversial vote, Omar publicly condemned the Armenian genocide at a rally for presidential candidate Bernie Sanders.

In September 2025, Omar introduced a war powers resolution to prevent the Trump administration from conducting future strikes in the Caribbean following a US attack on a Venezuelan boat.

=== Immigration ===
In a March 2019 Politico interview, Omar criticized Barack Obama's "caging of kids" along the Mexican border. Omar accused Politico of distorting her comments and said that she had been "saying how [President] Trump is different from Obama, and why we should focus on policy not politics," adding, "One is human, the other is really not."

In June 2019, Omar was one of four Democratic representatives to vote against the Emergency Supplemental Appropriations for Humanitarian Assistance and Security at the Southern Border Act, a $4.5 billion border funding bill that required Customs and Border Protection to enact health standards for individuals in custody such as standards for "medical emergencies; nutrition, hygiene, and facilities; and personnel training." "Throwing more money at the very organizations committing human rights abuses—and the very Administration directing these human rights abuses—is not a solution. This is a humanitarian crisis ... inflicted by our own leadership," she said.

=== Infrastructure spending ===
On November 5, 2021, Omar was one of six House Democrats to break with their party and vote against the Infrastructure Investment and Jobs Act because it was decoupled from the social safety net provisions in the Build Back Better Act.

=== Israeli–Palestinian conflict ===
==== Support for boycott efforts and other criticisms ====
While she was in the Minnesota legislature, Omar was critical of the Israeli government and opposed a law prohibiting the state from working with companies that support the Boycott, Divestment and Sanctions (BDS) movement. She compared the movement to people who "engage[d] in boycotts" of apartheid in South Africa. During her House campaign, she said she did not support the BDS movement, describing it as counterproductive to peace. After the election her position changed, as her campaign office told Muslim Girl that she supports the BDS movement despite "reservations on the effectiveness of the movement in accomplishing a lasting solution." Omar has voiced support for a two-state solution to resolve the Israeli–Palestinian conflict. She criticized Israel's settlement building in the Israeli-occupied Palestinian territories in the West Bank.

In 2018, Omar came under criticism for statements she made about Israel before she was in the Minnesota legislature. In a 2012 tweet, she wrote, "Israel has hypnotized the world, may Allah awaken the people and help them see the evil doings of Israel." The comment, particularly that Israel had "hypnotized the world", was criticized as drawing on antisemitic tropes. In an opinion piece in The New York Times, columnist Bari Weiss wrote that Omar's statement tied into a millennia-old "conspiracy theory of the Jew as the hypnotic conspirator". When asked in an interview how she would respond to American Jews who found the remark offensive, Omar replied: "I don't know how my comments would be offensive to Jewish Americans. My comments precisely are addressing what was happening during the Gaza War and I'm clearly speaking about the way the Israeli regime was conducting itself in that war." After reading Weiss's commentary, Omar apologized for not "disavowing the anti-Semitic trope I unknowingly used".

In September 2019, Omar condemned Benjamin Netanyahu's plans to annex the eastern portion of the occupied West Bank known as the Jordan Valley. Omar said Israelis should not vote for Netanyahu in the September 2019 Israeli legislative election.

==== Remarks on AIPAC and American support for Israel ====
In February 2019, Republican House Minority Leader Kevin McCarthy threatened to "take action" against Omar and Rashida Tlaib for their support of the BDS movement. When journalist Glenn Greenwald responded that it was remarkable "how much time U.S. political leaders spend defending a foreign nation even if it means attacking free speech rights of Americans", and tagged Omar for a comment, she replied with a quote from a hip hop song, "It's All About the Benjamins", alluding to a slang term for U.S. $100 bills. Both Democratic and Republican politicians accused her of using an antisemitic trope regarding Jews and money, although some Democratic politicians defended Omar's comment. Omar later said that she was referring to the influence of pro-Israel lobbyists in the United States, especially AIPAC.

A number of Democratic leaders—including House Speaker Nancy Pelosi, Majority Leader Steny Hoyer, and Majority Whip Jim Clyburn—condemned the tweet, which was interpreted as implying that money was fueling American politicians' support of Israel. The Democratic House leadership released a statement accusing Omar of "engaging in deeply offensive anti-Semitic tropes". The Jewish Democratic Council of America (JDCA) also denounced her statements. Omar issued an apology the next day, saying, "I am grateful for Jewish allies and colleagues who are educating me on the painful history of anti-Semitic tropes", and adding, "I reaffirm the problematic role of lobbyists in our politics, whether it be AIPAC, the NRA or the fossil fuel industry." The Anti-Defamation League accused her of promoting an "ugly conspiracy theory" about Jewish influence in politics. Journalist Peter Beinart, after tweeting that the controversy was about "policing the American debate over Israel", thought Omar's statement inaccurate, wrong and irresponsible, but argued that her congressional critics were more "bigoted" on Israeli-Palestinian issues than Omar.

On February 27, 2019, Omar said of her critics: "I want to talk about the political influence in this country that says it is OK for people to push for allegiance to a foreign country." The statements were quickly criticized as allegedly drawing on antisemitic tropes. House Foreign Affairs Committee chairman Eliot Engel said it was "deeply offensive to call into question the loyalty of fellow American citizens" and asked Omar to retract her statement. House Appropriations Committee chairwoman Nita Lowey also called for an apology and criticized the statements in a March 3 tweet, which led to an online exchange between the two. In response, Omar reaffirmed her position, insisting that she "should not be expected to have allegiance/pledge support to a foreign country in order to serve my country in Congress or serve on committee." Omar said she was simply criticizing Israel, drawing a distinction between criticism of Benjamin Netanyahu and being antisemitic. Omar's spokesman, Jeremy Slevin, said Omar was speaking out about "the undue influence of lobbying groups for foreign interests."

Reaction among 2020 Democratic presidential candidates was mixed. Senators Elizabeth Warren, Kamala Harris, and Bernie Sanders defended Omar. While Senator Cory Booker found her comments "disturbing", he recognized that some of the attacks against her had "anti-Islamic sentiment". Kirsten Gillibrand said, "those with critical views of Israel should be able to express their views without employing anti-Semitic tropes about money or influence", but also criticized the Republican Party for censuring Omar while saying "little or nothing" when President Trump "defended white supremacists at Charlottesville." New York City Mayor Bill de Blasio called Omar's remarks "unacceptable". According to The Guardian, election records archived by OpenSecrets "suggest a correlation between pro-Israel lobby campaign contributions and Democratic presidential candidates' position on the controversy." Some members of the Congressional Black Caucus believed Omar was unfairly targeted because she is a black Muslim, saying that "the Democratic leadership did not draft a resolution condemning Donald Trump or other white male Republicans over their antisemitic remarks." The second round of remarks prompted the Democratic leadership to introduce a resolution condemning antisemitism that did not specifically refer to Omar. After objections by a number of congressional progressive Democrats, the resolution was amended to include Islamophobia, racism, and homophobia. On March 7, the House passed the amended resolution. Omar called the resolution "historic on many fronts" and said, "We are tremendously proud to be part of a body that has put forth a condemnation of all forms of bigotry including anti-Semitism, racism, and white supremacy." Some Minnesota Jewish and Muslim community leaders later expressed continuing concern about Omar's statements and indicated that the issue remained divisive in Omar's district.

On March 7, 2019, the U.S. House of Representatives voted 407–23 to condemn "anti-Semitism, Islamophobia, racism and other forms of bigotry" in response to Omar's remarks concerning Israel. On February 2, 2023, the Republican-led House of Representatives passed a resolution, on a party-line vote, to remove Omar from the House Foreign Affairs Committee for what Speaker Kevin McCarthy called "repeated antisemitic and anti-American remarks." Many prominent House Democrats stood by Omar. On July 18, 2023, she voted against a congressional non-binding resolution proposed by August Pfluger, which states that "the State of Israel is not a racist or apartheid state", that Congress rejects "all forms of antisemitism and xenophobia", and that "the United States will always be a staunch partner and supporter of Israel". On October 16, 2023, Omar signed a resolution calling for a ceasefire in the Gaza war. She criticized the United States' support for Israeli bombing of the Gaza Strip. In May 2024, Omar voiced support for the International Criminal Court investigation in Palestine, saying that the ICC "must be allowed to conduct its work independently and without interference." In August 2024, she criticized the Biden administration's arms shipments to Israel, saying that "if you really want a ceasefire, you just stop sending the weapons." In June 2026, Omar accused Israel of acting with "near-total impunity", saying it had repeatedly been able to "commit genocide and other atrocities" without meaningful accountability. In a post on X, she wrote that Israel was "exporting the Gaza playbook to Lebanon" and that the conflict in Lebanon was killing thousands and displacing more than a million people. Omar also called for an end to U.S. military aid to Israel.

==== Ban from entering Israel ====
In August 2019, Omar and Representative Rashida Tlaib were banned from entering Israel, a reversal from the July 2019 statement by Israeli Ambassador to the United States Ron Dermer that "any member of Congress" would be allowed in. Israeli Prime Minister Benjamin Netanyahu attributed the ban to Israeli law preventing the entry of people who call for a boycott of Israel (as Omar and Tlaib had done with their support for BDS). Netanyahu also cited Omar and Tlaib listing their destination as Palestine instead of Israel, claiming he thus viewed their visit as an attempt to "hurt Israel and increase its unrest". Netanyahu also said that Omar and Tlaib did not plan on visiting or meeting with any Israeli officials from the government or the opposition, and additionally accused Miftah, the sponsor of Omar's trip, of having members who support terrorism against Israel (in 2016, Israel approved a visit by five U.S. representatives to Israel that Miftah co-sponsored, but that was before Israel enacted its anti-BDS law). Less than two hours before the ban, President Trump tweeted that Israel allowing the visit would "show great weakness" when Omar and Tlaib "hate Israel & all Jewish people". Omar said that Netanyahu had caved to Trump's demand and that "Trump's Muslim ban is what Israel is implementing". She responded to Netanyahu that she had intended to meet members of Israel's legislative Knesset and Israeli security officials. Both Democratic and Republican legislators criticized the ban and requested that Israel rescind it. AIPAC released a statement saying that it disagreed with Israel's move and that Omar and Tlaib should have been allowed to "experience Israel firsthand", while the head of the American Jewish Committee put out a statement agreeing with AIPAC on the matter. U.S. Representative Max Rose also criticized the move to ban Omar, saying that Omar and Tlaib did not speak for the Democratic Party.

=== LGBT rights ===
In March 2019, Omar addressed a rally in support of a Minnesota bill that would ban gay conversion therapy in the state. She co-sponsored a similar bill when she was a member of the Minnesota House. In May 2019, Omar introduced legislation that would sanction Brunei over a recently introduced law that would make homosexual sex and adultery punishable by death. In June 2019, she participated in Twin Cities Pride in Minnesota. In August 2019, Omar wrote on Twitter in support of the Palestinian LGBT rights group Al Qaws after the Palestinian Authority banned Al Qaws's activities in the West Bank.

=== Military policy ===
Omar has been critical of U.S. foreign policy, and has called for reduced funding for "perpetual war and military aggression", saying, "knowing my tax dollars pay for bombs killing children in Yemen makes my heart break," with "everyone in Washington saying we don't have enough money in the budget for universal health care, we don't have enough money in the budget to guarantee college education for everyone." Omar has criticized the U.S. government's drone assassination program, citing the Obama administration's policy of "droning of countries around the world". She has said, "we don't need nearly 800 military bases outside the United States to keep our country safe."

In 2019, Omar signed a letter led by Representative Ro Khanna and Senator Rand Paul to President Trump asserting that it is "long past time to rein in the use of force that goes beyond congressional authorization" and that they hoped this would "serve as a model for ending hostilities in the future—in particular, as you and your administration seek a political solution to our involvement in Afghanistan."

In May 2020, Omar signed a letter backed by AIPAC calling for the continuation of the UN embargo against Iran, with her office noting that it was a "narrow ask that we couldn't find anything wrong with." Her office said that she has opposed human rights abuse "for a long time" and that signing onto it should be not be seen as a sign she supports the Trump administration's policy on Iran.

On July 6, 2023, President Biden authorized the provision of cluster munitions to Ukraine in support of a Ukrainian counter-offensive against Russian forces in Russian-occupied southeastern Ukraine. Omar opposed the decision, saying, "We can support the people of Ukraine in their freedom struggle while also opposing violations of international law."

On June 4, 2026, Omar was the only Democrat to vote against the H.R. 2913 Ukraine Support Act, which authorized funding for military aid to Ukraine and sanctions on Russia.

=== Minimum wage ===
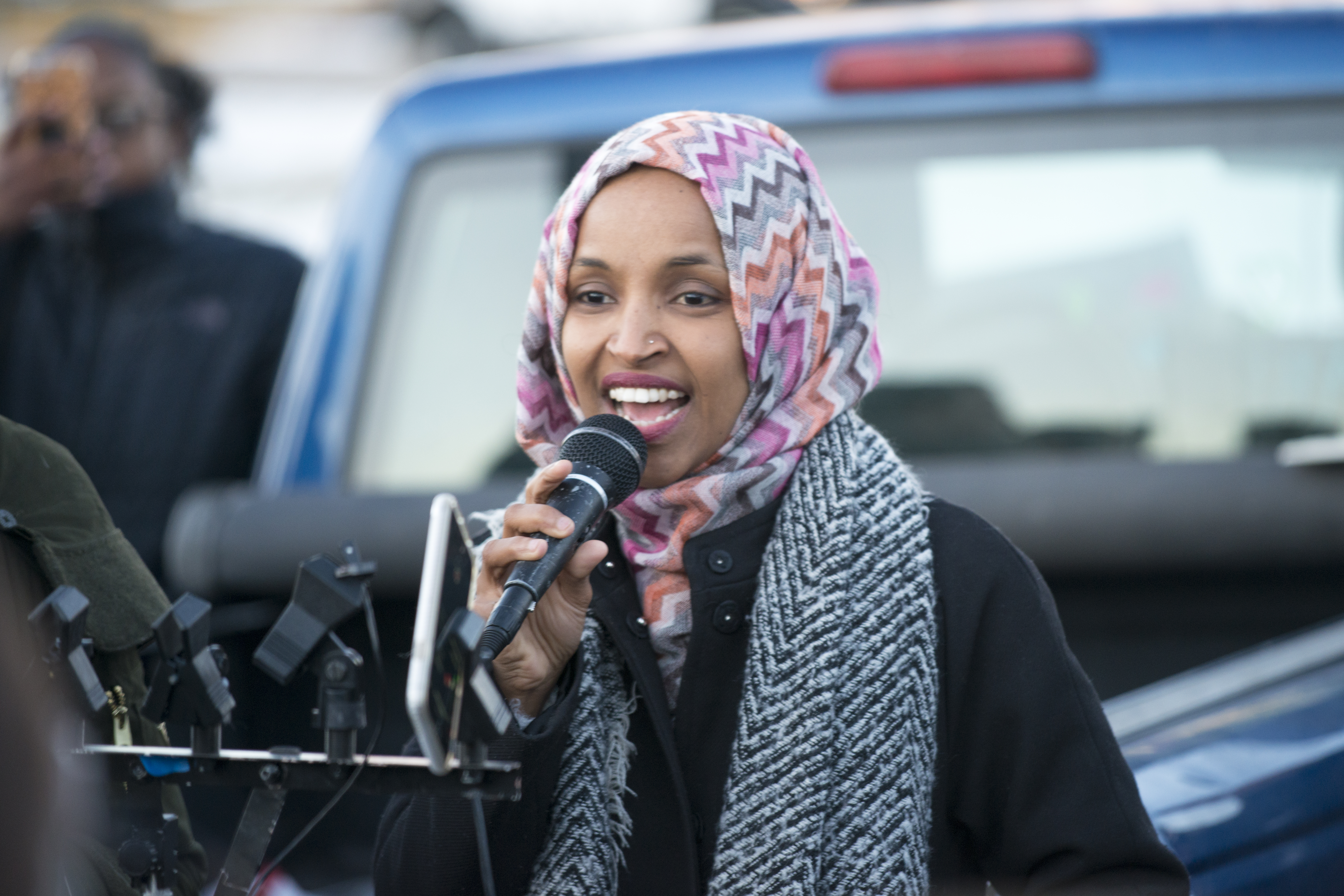
Omar speaking at a worker protest against Amazon, December 2018

In 2017, Omar supported a $15 hourly minimum wage. In 2023, she introduced a bill that would raise the minimum wage to $17 by 2028.

=== Minneapolis Police Department ===
In June 2020, the "defund the police" slogan gained widespread popularity following the murder of George Floyd. Black Lives Matter and other activists used the phrase to call for police budget reductions and a plan to delegate certain police responsibilities to other organizations. Reacting to the murder of Floyd, the majority of the Minneapolis City Council voted to dismantle the city's police department. In a statement, the Minneapolis mayor said they planned to work to address "systemic racism in police culture". Following the murder of Floyd, Omar supported the police abolition movement in Minneapolis that sought to dismantle the Minneapolis Police Department, saying that the department had "proven themselves beyond reform." Omar hoped to see a new police department that would be modeled after the Camden County Police Department in New Jersey.

=== TikTok ===
Omar has opposed a TikTok ban. In March 2024, she raised First Amendment concerns in opposing a bill that would ban the app if its Chinese owner did not sell, saying: "We should create actual standards & regulations around privacy violations across social media companies—not target platforms we don't like."

On March 12, Omar was asked about TikTok-related national security concerns, such as China using the app to ramp up divisions in the U.S., and replied, "We had an intel briefing, and none of the information that was provided to us really was persuasive in the fact that there is anything to be really concerned", adding, "for the first time in our nation's history, Americans have access to real images [through TikTok] of the horrors that are experienced by Palestinians daily."

=== Venezuela crisis ===
In January 2019, amid the Venezuelan presidential crisis, Omar joined Democrats Ro Khanna and Tulsi Gabbard in denouncing the Trump administration's decision to recognize Juan Guaidó, the president of the Venezuelan National Assembly, as Venezuela's interim president. She described Trump's action as a "U.S. backed coup" and said that the U.S. should not "hand pick" foreign leaders and should support "Mexico, Uruguay & the Vatican's efforts to facilitate a peaceful dialogue." In response to criticisms of her comments, Omar wrote that "No one is defending Maduro" and that opposing US intervention is not the equivalent of supporting the existing leadership of a country.

In February 2019, Omar questioned Elliott Abrams, Trump's envoy to Venezuela, noting that he had pleaded guilty to two counts of withholding information from Congress regarding the Iran–Contra affair. Omar also quoted Abrams's claim that U.S. involvement in the Salvadoran civil war had been a "fabulous achievement" and contrasted it with reports of the El Mozote massacre.

In May 2019, Omar said in an interview on Democracy Now! that she believed U.S. foreign policy and economic sanctions are aimed at regime change and have contributed to the "devastation in Venezuela".

== Death threats and harassment ==
=== DFL caucus attack ===
On February 4, 2014, Omar was attacked and injured by multiple attendees during a DFL caucus for Minnesota's House of Representatives District 60B. She was organizing the event and was a policy aide to Minneapolis City Councilman Andrew Johnson at the time. She sustained a concussion and was sent to the hospital.

=== Death threats ===
In February 2019, the FBI arrested United States Coast Guard Lieutenant Christopher Paul Hasson, who was allegedly plotting to assassinate various journalists and political figures in the United States, including Omar. According to prosecutors, Hasson is a self-described "long time White Nationalist" and former skinhead who wanted to use violence to "establish a white homeland." Prosecutors also alleged that Hasson was in contact with an American neo-Nazi leader, stockpiled weapons, and compiled a hit list.

On April 7, 2019, Patrick Carlineo Jr., was arrested for threatening to assault and murder Omar in a phone call to her office. He reportedly told investigators that he did not want Muslims in the government. In May 2019, Carlineo was released from custody and placed on house arrest. He pleaded guilty to the offense on November 19. Omar asked the court to be lenient with him.

In April 2019, Omar said that she had received more death threats after Trump made comments about her and 9/11, "many directly referencing or replying to the president's video". In August 2019, she published an anonymous threat she had received of being shot at the Minnesota State Fair, saying that such threats were why she now had security protection. In September 2019, she asserted Trump was putting her life in danger by retweeting a tweet falsely claiming she had "partied on the anniversary of 9/11".

Two Republican candidates for congressional office have called for Omar's execution. In November 2019, Danielle Stella, Omar's Republican opponent for Congress, was banned from Twitter for suggesting that Omar be hanged for treason if found guilty of passing information to Iran. In December 2019, George Buck, another Republican running for Congress, also suggested that Omar be hanged for treason. In response, Buck was removed from the National Republican Congressional Committee's Young Guns program. Neither candidate won their primary election.

In January 2026, 60-year-old Adam Lee Osborn of Wichita, Kansas, was arrested following threats he had made against Omar and New York City Mayor Zohran Mamdani on social media. In Facebook posts, Osborn had threatened to kill Omar, writing: "If illegals can come here unimpeded, I can kill them unimpeded. How the fuck do I end up a minority in my own country? This shit comes to an end, NOW!" According to an affidavit, during his interrogation, Osborn continued to threaten Omar and Mamdani and said he "wouldn't mind if they were killed".

=== "Go back" to their countries Trump tweet ===
On July 14, 2019, Trump tweeted that The Squad—a group that consists of Omar and three other young congresswomen of color, most of whom were born and raised in the U.S.—should "go back" to the "places from which they came". In response, Omar said Trump was "stoking white nationalism" because he was "angry that people like us are serving in Congress and fighting against your hate-filled agenda." Two days later, the House of Representatives voted 240–187 to condemn Trump's "racist comments". On July 17, it was reported that the U.S. Equal Employment Opportunity Commission lists the phrase "Go back to where you came from" as an example of "harassment based on national origin".

At a July 17 campaign rally in North Carolina, Trump made additional comments about The Squad: "They never have anything good to say. That's why I say, 'Hey if you don't like it, let 'em leave, let 'em leave'", and "I think in some cases they hate our country". He made a series of false and misleading claims about Omar, including allegations that she had praised al-Qaeda and "smeared" American soldiers who had fought in the Battle of Mogadishu by bringing up the numerous Somali civilian casualties. The crowd reacted by chanting, "Send her back, Send her back." Trump later called the crowd "incredible people, incredible patriots" and accused Omar of racism and antisemitism. On July 19, he falsely claimed that Omar and the rest of The Squad had used the term "evil Jews".

Foreign media has widely covered Trump's remarks about Omar and The Squad. The social media hashtag #IStandWithIlhanOmar was soon trending in the United States and other countries. Many foreign politicians condemned Trump's comments. On July 19, German Chancellor Angela Merkel said, "I reject [Trump's comments] and stand in solidarity with the congresswomen he targeted."

=== Target of online hate speech ===
Omar has frequently been the target of online hate speech. According to a study by the Social Science Research Council of more than 113,000 tweets about Muslim candidates in the weeks leading up to the 2018 midterm elections, Omar "was the prime target. Roughly half of the 90,000 tweets mentioning her included hate speech or Islamophobic or anti-immigrant language." According to the study, "Key themes included Muslims as subhumans or 'Trojan horses' seeking to impose Shariah law on America.... A large proportion of these trolls were likely bots or automated accounts run by people, organizations or state actors seeking to spread political propaganda and hate speech. That's based on telltale iconography, naming patterns, webs of linkages and the breadth of the postelection scrubbing."

=== 9/11 comments and World Trade Center cover ===
On April 11, 2019, the front page of the New York Post carried an image of the World Trade Center burning following the September 11 terrorist attacks and a quotation from a speech Omar gave the previous month. The headline read, "REP. ILHAN OMAR: 9/11 WAS 'SOME PEOPLE DID SOMETHING'", and a caption underneath added, "Here's your something ... 2,977 people dead by terrorism." The Post was quoting a speech Omar had given at a recent Council on American–Islamic Relations (CAIR) meeting. In the speech Omar said, "CAIR was founded after 9/11 because they recognized that some people did something and that all of us [Muslims in the U.S.] were starting to lose access to our civil liberties." (CAIR was founded in 1994, but many new members joined after the 9/11 attacks in 2001.)

On April 12, President Trump retweeted a video that edited Omar's remarks to remove context, showing her saying, "Some people did something." Some Democratic representatives condemned Trump's retweet, predicting that it would incite violence and hatred. House Speaker Nancy Pelosi called on Trump to "take down his disrespectful and dangerous video" and asked the U.S. Capitol Police to increase its protection of Omar.

Speaking at an April 30 protest by black women calling for formal censure of Trump, Omar blamed Trump and his allies for inciting Americans against both Jews and Muslims.

=== Comments by Lauren Boebert ===
In November 2021, Republican Representative Lauren Boebert said she had shared an elevator with Omar, and that she and a Capitol Police officer both mistook Omar for a terrorist. Boebert referred to Omar as the "Jihad Squad". Omar said that she had not shared an elevator with Boebert, that the story was made up, and that Boebert's comments were "anti-Muslim bigotry".

=== Spraying incident ===
During January 2026, federal agents participating in Operation Metro Surge shot three people in Minneapolis, killing two of them. It was announced ahead of time that Omar would hold a town hall meeting in Minneapolis on January 27, the Tuesday after the most recent shooting. During the town hall, a man sprayed apple cider vinegar from a syringe at Omar. Just before being sprayed, Omar had called for the abolition of Immigration and Customs Enforcement and called on Homeland Security secretary Kristi Noem to resign from her position or face impeachment. The man was restrained and whisked out of the room, and Omar continued the town hall. The incident drew bipartisan condemnation. Hours before Omar was attacked, Trump had criticized her in a speech in Clive, Iowa, saying: "They [immigrants] have to show that they can love our country. They have to be proud, not like Ilhan Omar." After the town hall attack, Trump accused Omar of staging the incident, saying, "she probably had herself sprayed, knowing her". After the incident, Omar wrote, "this small agitator isn't going to intimidate me from doing my work" and "I don't let bullies win".

== Electoral history ==
=== 2016 ===
Minnesota State Representative District 60B Democratic primary, 2016
Party	Candidate	Votes	%
Democratic (DFL)	Ilhan Omar	2,404	40.97
Democratic (DFL)	Mohamud Noor	1,738	29.62
Democratic (DFL)	Phyllis Kahn	1,726	29.41
Total votes		5,868	100.0

Minnesota State Representative District 60B, 2016
Party	Candidate	Votes	%
Democratic (DFL)	Ilhan Omar	15,860	79.77
Republican	Abdimalik Askar	3,820	19.21
Write-in		203	1.02
Total votes		19,883	100.0
Democratic (DFL) hold			

=== 2018 ===
Minnesota's 5th congressional district Democratic primary, 2018
Party	Candidate	Votes	%
Democratic (DFL)	Ilhan Omar	65,238	48.2
Democratic (DFL)	Margaret Anderson Kelliher	41,156	30.4
Democratic (DFL)	Patricia Torres Ray	17,629	13.0
Democratic (DFL)	Jamal Abdulahi	4,984	3.7
Democratic (DFL)	Bobby Joe Champion	3,831	2.8
Democratic (DFL)	Frank Drake	2,480	1.8
Total votes		135,318	100.0

Minnesota's 5th congressional district, 2018
Party	Candidate	Votes	%
Democratic (DFL)	Ilhan Omar	267,703	77.97
Republican	Jennifer Zielinski	74,440	21.68
Write-in		1,215	0.35
Total votes		343,358	100.0
Democratic (DFL) hold			

=== 2020 ===
Minnesota's 5th congressional district Democratic primary, 2020
Party	Candidate	Votes	%
Democratic (DFL)	Ilhan Omar	92,443	57.4
Democratic (DFL)	Antone Melton-Meaux	63,059	39.2
Democratic (DFL)	John Mason	2,497	1.6
Democratic (DFL)	Daniel Patrick McCarthy	1,792	1.1
Democratic (DFL)	Les Lester	1,147	0.7
Total votes		160,938	100.0

Minnesota's 5th congressional district, 2020
Party	Candidate	Votes	%
Democratic (DFL)	Ilhan Omar	255,924	64.3
Republican	Lacy Johnson	102,878	25.8
Legal Marijuana Now	Michael Moore	37,979	9.5
Green	Toya Woodland	34	0.0
Total votes		398,263	100.0
Democratic (DFL) hold			

=== 2022 ===
Minnesota's 5th congressional district Democratic primary, 2022
Party	Candidate	Votes	%
Democratic (DFL)	Ilhan Omar	57,683	50.3
Democratic (DFL)	Don Samuels	55,217	48.2
Democratic (DFL)	Nate Schluter	671	0.6
Democratic (DFL)	AJ Kern	519	0.5
Democratic (DFL)	Albert Ross	477	0.4
Total votes		114,567	100.0

Minnesota's 5th congressional district, 2022
Party	Candidate	Votes	%
Democratic (DFL)	Ilhan Omar (incumbent)	214,224	74.3
Republican	Cicely Davis	70,702	24.5
Write-in		3,280	1.1
Total votes		288,206	100.0
Democratic (DFL) hold			

=== 2024 ===
Minnesota's 5th congressional district Democratic primary, 2024
Party	Candidate	Votes	%
Democratic (DFL)	Ilhan Omar (incumbent)	67,926	56.2
Democratic (DFL)	Don Samuels	51,839	42.9
Democratic (DFL)	Nate Schluter	575	0.5
Democratic (DFL)	Abena McKenzie	461	0.4
Total votes		120,801	100.0

Minnesota's 5th congressional district, 2024
Party	Candidate	Votes	%
Democratic (DFL)	Ilhan Omar (incumbent)	261,066	74.4
Republican	Dalia Al-Aqidi	86,213	24.6
Write-in		3,768	1.1
Total votes		351,047	100.0
Democratic (DFL) hold			

=== 2026 ===
Minnesota's 5th congressional district Democratic primary, 2026
Party	Candidate	Votes	%
Democratic (DFL)	Ilhan Omar (incumbent)	122,640	80.7
Democratic (DFL)	Julie Le	10,201	6.7
Democratic (DFL)	Latonya Reeves	9,131	6.0
Democratic (DFL)	Nate Schluter	8,016	5.3
Democratic (DFL)	Abena McKenzie	1,961	1.3
Total votes		151,949	100.0

== Awards and honors ==
Omar received the 2015 Community Leadership Award from Mshale, an African immigrant media outlet based in Minneapolis. The prize is awarded annually on a readership basis.

In 2017, Time magazine named Omar among its "Firsts: Women who are changing the world," a special report on 46 women who broke barriers in their respective disciplines, and featured her on the cover of its September 18 issue. Her family was named one of the "five families who are changing the world as we know it" by Vogue in their February 2018 issue featuring photographs by Annie Leibovitz.

== Media appearances ==
In 2018, Omar was featured in the music video for Maroon 5's "Girls Like You" featuring Cardi B.

The 2018 documentary film Time for Ilhan (directed by Norah Shapiro, produced by Jennifer Steinman Sternin and Chris Newberry) chronicles Omar's political campaign. It was selected to show at the Tribeca Film Festival and the Mill Valley Film Festival.

Following a July 2019 tweet by Trump that The Squad—a group that consists of Omar and three other congresswomen of color who were born in the United States—should "go back" to the "places from which they came", Omar and the other members of the Squad held a press conference that was taped by CNN and posted to social media.

On October 19, 2020, Omar joined Ocasio-Cortez, Disguised Toast, Jacksepticeye, and Pokimane in a Twitch stream playing the popular game Among Us, encouraging streamers to vote in the 2020 election. This collaboration garnered almost half a million views.

== Personal life ==
In 2002, Omar became engaged to Ahmed Abdisalan Hirsi (né Aden). She has said they had an unofficial, faith-based Islamic marriage. The couple had two children together, including Isra Hirsi, one of the three principal organizers of the school strike for climate in the US. Omar has said that she and Hirsi divorced within their faith tradition in 2008.

In 2009, Omar married Ahmed Nur Said Elmi, a British Somali. According to Omar, in 2011 she and Elmi had a faith-based divorce and she reconciled with Hirsi, with whom she had a third child in 2012. In 2017, Elmi and Omar legally divorced, and Omar and Hirsi legally married in 2018. On October 7, 2019, Omar filed for divorce from Hirsi, citing an "irretrievable breakdown" of the marriage. The divorce was finalized on November 5, 2019. In 2026, the New York Times reported, based on interviews with six officials with relevant knowledge, that in 2016 the Federal Bureau of Investigation and the Department of Homeland Security had investigated Omar's marriage to Elmi and found some evidence that the marriage could be fraudulent.

In March 2020, Omar married Tim Mynett, a political consultant whose political consulting firm, the E Street Group, received $2.78 million in contracts from Omar's campaign during the 2020 cycle. Omar's spokesman, Jeremy Slevin, told the BBC that Mynett converted to Islam. The campaign's contract with Mynett's firm became a focus of criticism by her Democratic primary opponent and conservative critics that received significant local and national media attention. On November 17, 2020, Omar's campaign terminated its contract with Mynett's firm, saying the termination was to "make sure that anybody who is supporting our campaign with their time or financial support feels there is no perceived issue with that support".

In 2020, HarperCollins published Omar's memoir, This Is What America Looks Like, written with Rebecca Paley.

== See also ==
- List of African-American United States representatives
- List of Muslim members of the United States Congress
- Women in the United States House of Representatives

== Notes ==
U.S. House of Representatives
Preceded by Keith Ellison	Member of the U.S. House of Representatives from Minnesota's 5th congressional district 2019–present	Incumbent
U.S. order of precedence (ceremonial)
Preceded by Alexandria Ocasio-Cortez	United States representatives by seniority 218th	Succeeded by Chris Pappas
