= Don Samuels =

American politician (born 1949)

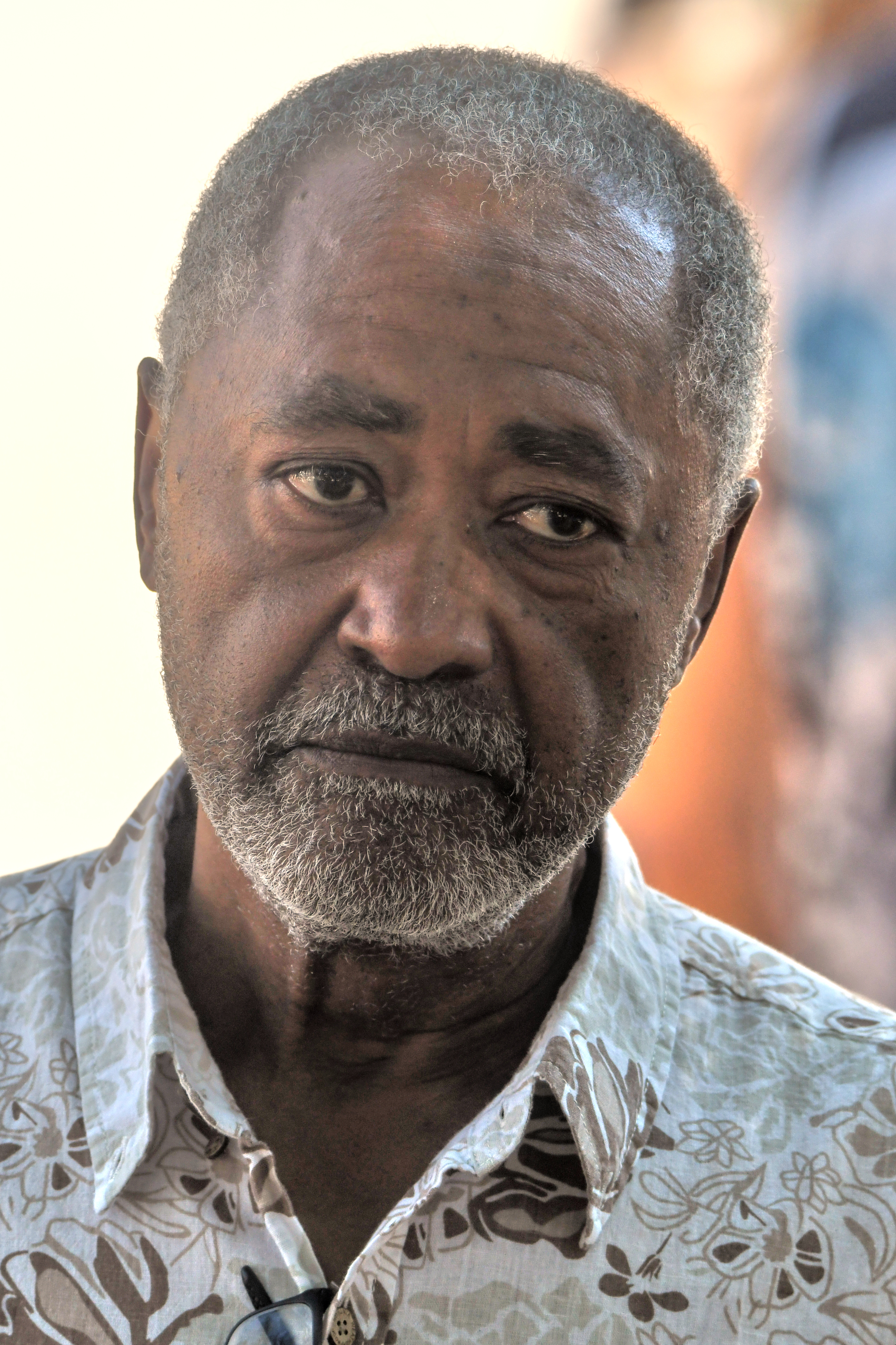
- Samuels in 2022

Member of the Minneapolis City Council
- In office February 14, 2003 – January 6, 2014
- Preceded by: Joe Biernat
- Succeeded by: Blong Yang
- Constituency: 3rd ward (2003–2006); 5th ward (2006–2014)

Personal details
- Born: May 13, 1949 (age 77) Jamaica
- Party: Democratic
- Education: Pratt Institute (BS); Luther Seminary (MDiv)

Don Samuels (born May 13, 1949) is an American politician, activist, and non-profit executive who served as a member of the Minneapolis City Council from 2003 to 2014. A member of the DFL, Samuels represented the 3rd and 5th wards during his three-term tenure. He also served one term as an at-large representative on the Minneapolis Public Schools Board from 2015 to 2019.

Samuels is the former CEO of MicroGrants, a Minnesota non-profit that offers small grants to low-income individuals. Samuels came to national attention when he placed an unexpectedly close second to incumbent Congresswoman Ilhan Omar in the 2022 DFL primary for Minnesota's 5th congressional district. Samuels ran again in 2024 but lost to Omar again by a wider 13% margin.

== Career ==
=== Minneapolis City Council (2003–2014) ===
Samuels was elected to represent Ward 3 on the Minneapolis City Council in a special election in 2003, completing the final three years of Joe Biernat's term. Samuels was sworn in on February 14, 2003, though a 2005 redistricting led to Samuels' home becoming part of the city's Ward 5.

Samuels' tenure on the Council centered on issues of public health and safety. He sponsored Minneapolis' 2004 indoor smoking ban, whose provisions would later be adopted by the broader 2007 Minnesota Clean Indoor Air Act. Samuels also initiated the Minneapolis "Ban the Box" policy, which removed the checkbox requiring applicants to indicate their felony status from most municipal job applications. To reduce hiring bias, the ordinance mandated that whether an individual had committed a felony be considered only after the initial job selection.

In 2007, Samuels drew criticism from journalist Nick Coleman and others for stating "I've said burn North High School down." Samuels made the comments in reference to low graduation rates for African Americans at the school. He defended the statement as one meant to draw attention to systemic under-education of Black youth, which he said "needs to be fixed, but before it can be fixed, you have to say it's bad." He later apologized for his words.

Samuels supported public financing for U.S. Bank Stadium, the new Minnesota Vikings stadium, to replace the Metrodome. He briefly campaigned for Hennepin County Commissioner in 2012.

In 2013, Samuels announced a run for Mayor of Minneapolis and did not run for re-election to the City Council. Though he outperformed all other candidates in North Minneapolis, he ultimately lost the race to Betsy Hodges. Several Democratic candidates, including Samuels, were the target of Republican donations during the cycle. Samuels' term ended January 6, 2014, when his successor Blong Yang was sworn into office.

=== Post-Council political career ===
Samuels was elected to serve on the Minneapolis Public Schools school board in 2014 as an at-large representative. He served for one term, from January 13, 2015, until January 15, 2019. During his campaign, Samuels called the police on a Get Out the Vote event by Neighborhoods Organizing for Change. At the event, hot dogs were given away and Samuels called the police because he thought food was being sold illegally. Police questioned event organizers to see if they were trying to elicit votes and Samuels later said that he was a supporter of Neighborhoods Organizing for Change.

In 2020, Samuels was among several Minneapolis residents who sued the Minneapolis City Council and Mayor Jacob Frey, alleging they did not hire enough police officers as required by city charter. In 2021, Samuels was active in the successful campaign to defeat a charter amendment that would have eliminated the Minneapolis Police Department.

=== 2022 congressional campaign ===
Samuels launched a DFL primary challenge for Minnesota's 5th congressional district against Ilhan Omar in March 2022. Samuels was endorsed by former Chief of the Minneapolis Police Department, Medaria Arradondo and Minneapolis mayor Jacob Frey. According to campaign finance records, Samuels outraised Omar in the second quarter of 2022. Samuels' campaign focused on crime prevention, Omar's support for the police abolition movement, and the unsuccessful call to replace the Minneapolis Police Department through a charter amendment ballot initiative.

Samuels was defeated by Omar in the primary on August 9, 2022, by 2.1% and fewer than 2,500 votes. By the end of the campaign, Samuels had spent around $1.4 million.

=== 2024 congressional campaign ===
In November 2023, Samuels announced another primary challenge to Ilhan Omar. The campaign's launch led to a longer campaign period than in 2022, when Samuels mounted his challenge in March. His campaign was managed by Joe Radinovich, who also managed his 2022 campaign.

Samuels and Omar differentiated themselves on public safety, governing style, support for Joe Biden, antisemitism, and the Gaza war, though both candidates agreed on the need for a ceasefire in the latter. Samuels and Omar also had similar positions in regards to abortion and protecting the environment. Samuels supports limiting restrictive zoning policies that only allow single-family homes and proposes federal grants to help create neighborhood corner stores.

While on a podcast run by former Republican Party staff members, Samuels criticized Omar for not being connected enough to her constituents by saying "You're not cute enough, you don’t dress well enough, nothing about you is attractive enough to overcome that deficit." Omar criticized the comments as sexist. Samuels denies criticizing her appearance and instead he was instead criticizing her constituent services and that "you" referred to all politicians and not just Omar.

At the May 2024 DFL convention, Samuels lost the DFL endorsement to Omar on the first ballot with Omar receiving 60.5% of the vote. He remained in the race for the August DFL primary election. In 2023-2024 election cycle, Samuels raised $1,429,169. On June 17, 2024, International Union of Operating Engineers and the United Steelworkers endorsed Samuels over Omar in the 2024 Congressional race. He lost on August 13, 2024 with 43.9% or 51,581 votes. Ilhan Omar was the nominee again.

== Personal life ==
Samuels was born in Jamaica on May 13, 1949, as one of ten children of a Pentecostal minister. He moved to the United States at the age of 20 to pursue an education and subsequently worked as a toy/industrial designer for 30 years. Samuels lives in North Minneapolis with his wife and four children.

In 2020, Samuels and his wife, Sondra, took a group of children to Boom Island Park. The children were recipients of social services through Sondra Samuels' nonprofit, Northside Achievement Zone. While there, the children were allowed to put their feet in the water, though one was swept away as he waded in and drowned. Sondra Samuels' insurance company later paid out a wrongful death settlement of $301,000. After being criticized for his role in the child's death, Don Samuels tweeted "can't swim but can govern," a tweet he ultimately deleted and apologized for. He has called that day "the most devastating day in our lives."

Samuels was the CEO of a non-profit called MicroGrants which issues small grants to low-income individuals and families. The non-profit administers a program called LightsOn! where rather than ticket low-income drivers for broken tail lights, drivers are offered a $250 repair vouchers that may be redeemed through local partners. The program was created following the 2016 shooting of Philando Castile, who was killed by a police officer after being pulled over for a broken tail light.
