= List of justices of the Minnesota Supreme Court =

Following is a list of persons who have served on the Minnesota Supreme Court.

== Territorial Supreme Court justices ==
Justices of the Minnesota Territorial Supreme Court.

Image	Name	Begin	End
	Aaron Goodrich*	1849	1851
	David Cooper	1849	1853
	Bradley B. Meeker	1849	1853
	Jerome Fuller*‡	1851	1852
	Henry Z. Hayner* (Note: Appointed by President Fillmore after U.S. Senate rejected Fuller's appointment, but arrived too late to preside over the court. The news of the rejection did not reach St. Paul until after Fuller had arrived and begun his duties as chief justice.)	1851	1852
	Andrew G. Chatfield	1853	1857
	Moses Sherburne	1853	1857
	William H. Welch*	1853	1858
	Rensselaer Nelson	1857	1858
	Charles Eugene Flandrau	1857	1858

*-Chief Justice †-Elected ‡-Served as Chief Justice, but confirmation rejected by U.S. Senate

=== Chief justices ===
Chief Justice	Term
Aaron Goodrich	1849–1851
Jerome Fuller	1851–1852
Henry Z. Hayner	1851–1852
William H. Welch	1853–1858

== All justices ==
Following is a list of all justices of the Minnesota Supreme Court. Chief Justice terms are in bold.

Image	Name	Method	Began service	Ended service
	Charles Eugene Flandrau	Appointed	1858	1864
	Isaac Atwater	Elected	1858	1864
	LaFayette Emmett	Elected	**1858**	**1865**
	Thomas Wilson	Appointed	1864; **1865**	1865; **1869**
	John M. Berry	Elected	1865	1887
	James Gilfillan	Appointed	**1869**; **1875**	**1870**; **1894**
	Christopher G. Ripley	Elected	**1870**	**1874**
	Samuel J. R. McMillan	Appointed	1864; **1874**	1874; **1875**
	George B. Young	Appointed	1874	1875
	Francis R. E. Cornell	Elected	1875	1881
	Greenleaf Clark	Appointed	1881	1882
	Daniel A. Dickinson	Appointed	1881	1893
	William B. Mitchell	Appointed	1881	1900
	Charles E. Vanderburgh	Elected	1882	1894
	Loren W. Collins	Appointed	1887	1904
	Daniel Buck	Elected	1894	1899
	Thomas Canty	Elected	1894	1899
	Charles M. Start	Elected	**1895**	**1913**
	Calvin L. Brown	Appointed	1899; **1913**	1912; **1923**
	John A. Lovely	Elected	1900	1905
	Charles Lundy Lewis	Elected	1900	1912
	Wallace B. Douglas	Elected	1904	1905
	Charles B. Elliott	Appointed	1905	1909
	Edwin A. Jaggard	Elected	1905	1911
	Thomas D. O'Brien	Appointed	1909	1911
	David F. Simpson	Elected	1911	1911
	George Bunn	Appointed	1911; 1913	1913; 1918
	Philip E. Brown	Appointed	1912	1915
	Andrew Holt	Appointed	1912	1942
	Oscar Hallam	Elected	1913	1923
	Albert Schaller	Appointed	1915	1917
	James H. Quinn	Elected	1917	1928
	Homer B. Dibell	Appointed	1918	1934
	Samuel B. Wilson	Appointed	**1922**	**1933**
	Royal A. Stone	Appointed	1923	1942
	Clifford L. Hilton	Appointed	1928	1943
	Charles Loring	Appointed	1930; **1944**	1944; **1953**
	Ingerval M. Olsen	Appointed	1930	1936
	John P. Devaney	Appointed	**1933**	**1937**
	Julius J. Olson	Appointed	1934	1948
	Harry H. Peterson	Appointed	1936	1950
	Henry M. Gallagher	Appointed	**1937**	**1944**
	Maynard Pirsig	Appointed	1942	1942
	Thomas O. Streissguth	Appointed	1942; 1944	1942; 1944
	Luther Youngdahl	Elected	1943	1946
	Clarence R. Magney	Appointed	1943	1953
	Thomas F. Gallagher	Elected	1943	1967
	Leroy E. Matson	Elected	1945	1960
	William C. Christianson	Appointed	1946	1946
	Frank T. Gallagher	Elected	1947	1963
	Oscar Knutson	Appointed	1948; **1962**	1962; **1973**
	Theodore Christianson	Appointed	1950	1955
	Roger L. Dell	Appointed	1953; **1953**	1953; **1962**
	Martin A. Nelson	Appointed	1953	1972
	William P. Murphy	Appointed	1955	1972
	Lee Loevinger	Appointed	1960	1961
	James C. Otis	Appointed	1961	1982
	Walter F. Rogosheske	Appointed	1962	1980
	Robert Sheran	Appointed	1963; **1973**	1970; **1981**
	C. Donald Peterson	Elected	1967	1986
	Fallon Kelly	Appointed	1970	1980
	Harry H. MacLaughlin	Appointed	1972	1977
	John J. Todd	Appointed	1972	1985
	George M. Scott	Appointed	1973	1987
	Lawrence R. Yetka	Appointed	1973	1993
	Rosalie E. Wahl	Appointed	1977	1994
	John E. Simonett	Appointed	1980	1994
	Douglas K. Amdahl	Appointed	1980; **1981**	1981; **1989**
	Glenn E. Kelley	Appointed	1981	1990
	Mary Jeanne Coyne	Appointed	1982	1996
	Peter Popovich	Appointed	1987; **1989**	1989; **1990**
	Sandy Keith	Appointed	1989; **1990**	1990; **1998**
	Esther Tomljanovich	Appointed	1990	1998
	Sandra Gardebring Ogren	Appointed	1991	1998
	Alan Page	Elected	1993	2015
	Edward C. Stringer	Appointed	1994	2002
	Paul Anderson	Appointed	1994	2013
	Kathleen A. Blatz	Appointed	1996; **1998**	1998; **2006**
	Russell A. Anderson	Appointed	1998; **2006**	2006; **2008**
	Joan N. Ericksen	Appointed	1998	2002
	James H. Gilbert	Appointed	1998	2004
	Sam Hanson	Appointed	2002	2008
	Helen Meyer	Appointed	2002	2012
	Barry Anderson	Appointed	2004	2024
	Lorie Skjerven Gildea	Appointed	2006; **2010**	2010; **2023**
	Eric J. Magnuson	Appointed	**2008**	**2010**
	Christopher Dietzen	Appointed	2008	2016
	David Stras	Appointed	2010	2018
	Wilhelmina Wright	Appointed	2012	2016
	David Lillehaug	Appointed	2013	2020
	Natalie Hudson	Appointed	2015; **2023**	2023; **2026**
	Margaret H. Chutich	Appointed	2016	2024
	Anne McKeig	Appointed	2016	Present
	Paul Thissen	Appointed	2018	Present
	Gordon Moore	Appointed	2020	Present
	Karl Procaccini	Appointed	2023	Present
	Sarah Hennesy	Appointed	2024	Present
	Theodora Gaïtas	Appointed	2024; **2026**	2026; **Present**
	Reynaldo Aligada	Appointed	2026	Present

=== Chief justices ===
Chief Justice	Term
LaFayette Emmett	1858–1865
Thomas Wilson	1865–1869
James Gilfillan	1869–1870
Christopher G. Ripley	1870–1874
Samuel James Renwick McMillan	1874–1875
James Gilfillan	1875–1894
Charles M. Start	1895–1913
Calvin L. Brown	1913–1923
Samuel B. Wilson	1923–1933
John P. Devaney	1933–1937
Henry M. Gallagher	1937–1944
Charles Loring	1944–1953
Roger L. Dell	1953–1962
Oscar Knutson	1962–1973
Robert J. Sheran	1973–1981
Douglas K. Amdahl	1981–1989
Peter S. Popovich	1989–1990
Alexander M. Keith	1990–1998
Kathleen A. Blatz	1998–2006
Russell A. Anderson	2006–2008
Eric J. Magnuson	2008–2010
Lorie Skjerven Gildea	2010–2023
Natalie Hudson	2023–2026
Theodora Gaïtas	2026–present
