= List of Mitchell Hamline School of Law alumni =

This is a list of Mitchell Hamline School of Law alumni.

The law library on campus is named in honor of Warren E. Burger, the fifteenth Chief Justice of the United States, who graduated from one of the school's predecessor institutions, St. Paul College of Law.

Other notable graduates include:

- August Andresen, former United States Congressman
- Joe Atkins, former Minnesota State Representative
- Elmer A. Benson, former United States Senator and Governor of Minnesota
- Bobby Joe Champion, Minnesota State Senator
- Ray P. Chase, former United States Congressman
- Tarryl Clark, former Minnesota State Senator
- Richard Cohen, former Minnesota State Senator
- Roger L. Dell, former Chief Justice of the Minnesota Supreme Court
- Sean Duffy, former United States Congressman from Wisconsin
- Tom Emmer, United States Congressman from Minnesota
- William T. Francis, former U.S. Ambassador to Liberia
- Sam Hanson, former Justice of the Minnesota Supreme Court
- Duchess Harris, professor at Macalester College
- Debra Hilstrom, former Minnesota State Representative
- Dewey W. Johnson, former United States Congressman
- Matthew E. Johnson, Chief Judge, Minnesota Court of Appeals
- Jim Lord, former State Treasurer
- Myles Mace, former Distinguished Professor, Harvard Business School
- Eric J. Magnuson, former Chief Justice of the Minnesota Supreme Court
- Paul A. Magnuson, Senior Judge, U.S. District Court for the District of Minnesota
- John J. McDonough, former mayor of Saint Paul
- Fred McNeill, former Minnesota Vikings player
- Robert W. Mattson, Jr., former Minnesota State Auditor
- Pat Mazorol, former Minnesota State Representative
- Helen Meyer, former Justice of the Minnesota Supreme Court
- Ted Mondale, former Minnesota State Senator and former chairman of the Metropolitan Council
- William P. Murphy, former Justice of the Minnesota Supreme Court
- Arthur E. Nelson, former United States Senator
- Martin A. Nelson, former Justice of the Minnesota Supreme Court
- Scott Newman, former Minnesota State Senator
- Floyd B. Olson, former Governor of Minnesota
- Peter S. Popovich, former Chief Justice of the Minnesota Supreme Court
- Joey San Nicolas, former Attorney General for the Northern Mariana Islands
- John B. Sanborn, Jr., former Judge, U.S. Court of Appeals for the Eighth Circuit
- Thomas D. Schall, former United States Senator
- Linda Scheid, former Minnesota State Senator
- Gary J. Schmidt, former Wisconsin State Assemblyman
- Adrienne Southworth, member of the Kentucky Senate for District 7
- Corey Stewart, former candidate for Governor and Lt. Governor of Virginia, chair, Board of Supervisors, Prince William County, Virginia
- Lena O. Smith, Minnesota's first African-American female lawyer
- Esther Tomljanovich, former Justice of the Minnesota Supreme Court
- Robert Vanasek, former Speaker of the Minnesota House of Representatives
- Robert Vogel, former U.S. Attorney for the District of North Dakota and Justice of the North Dakota Supreme Court
- Jean Wagenius, former Minnesota State Representative
- Rosalie E. Wahl, former Justice of the Minnesota Supreme Court
- Torrey Westrom, Minnesota State Senator
- Luther Youngdahl, former Governor of Minnesota, Justice of the Minnesota Supreme Court, and Judge of the U.S. District Court for the District of Columbia
- Oscar Youngdahl, former United States Congressman
- G. Aaron Youngquist, former Minnesota Attorney General and Assistant U.S. Attorney General
