= Samuel J. R. McMillan =

American judge (1826–1897)

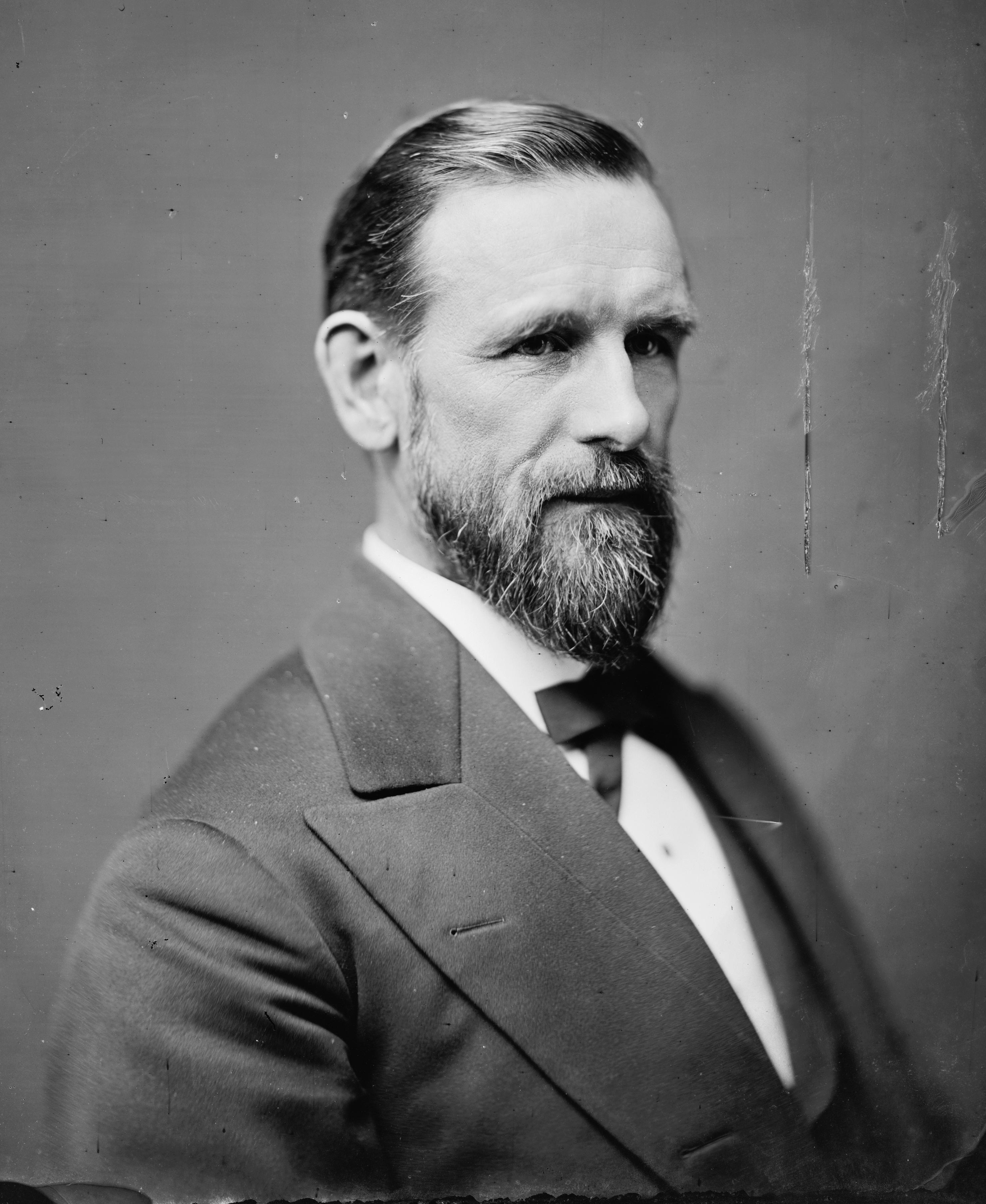
- McMillan, 1865–1880

United States Senator from Minnesota
- In office March 4, 1875 – March 3, 1887
- Preceded by: Alexander Ramsey
- Succeeded by: Cushman Kellogg Davis

Personal details
- Born: Samuel James Renwick McMillan; February 22, 1826 Brownsville, Pennsylvania, US
- Died: October 3, 1897 (aged 71) Saint Paul, Minnesota, US
- Resting place: Oakland Cemetery; Saint Paul, Minnesota
- Party: Republican
- Spouse: Harriet Butler
- Education: University of Pittsburgh

Military service
- Branch/service: Stillwater Frontier Guards
- Rank: Second Lieutenant
- Battles/wars: Dakota War of 1862

Samuel James Renwick McMillan (February 22, 1826 – October 3, 1897) was an American lawyer, judge and Republican politician. He served on the Minnesota District Court, the Minnesota Supreme Court and as U.S. Senator from Minnesota.

== Life and career ==
McMillan was born in Brownsville, Pennsylvania in 1826. His parents Thomas Long and Jane McMillan (née Gormly) were of Scottish and Irish ancestry. He attended the University of Pittsburgh (then known as the Western University of Pennsylvania) in Pittsburgh, Pennsylvania and studied law under Edwin M. Stanton, graduating in 1846. In 1850 he married Harriet Butler. McMillan and his wife moved to Minnesota in 1852, initially settling in Stillwater and later moving to St. Paul.

When Minnesota achieved statehood in 1858 McMillan was named as the first judge of the newly formed Minnesota District Court. During the Dakota War of 1862 McMillan served as a Second Lieutenant in a militia unit known as the Stillwater Frontier Guards which was only briefly active. In 1864 he was appointed to the Minnesota Supreme Court as one of two new justices to replace the recently resigned Justices Charles Eugene Flandrau and Isaac Atwater. In 1874 he was promoted to Chief Justice to replace Christopher G. Ripley who had also resigned. In 1875, the Minnesota Legislature elected him to serve as U.S. Senator. He served in the 44th, 45th, 46th, 47th, 48th, and 49th United States Congresses from March 4, 1875, to March 3, 1887.

McMillan did not stand for re-election in 1886 and returned to his law practice after the end of his term. He died in Saint Paul on October 3, 1897. He is buried in Oakland Cemetery in St. Paul, Minnesota.

== Samuel James Renwick McMillan family papers, 1818-1956. Minnesota Historical Society ==
Ravi D. Goel collection of Samuel James Renwick McMillan family papers, 1818-1956, Minnesota Historical Society. The collection includes photos, personal letters, transcribed documents, and printed publications from 1818 to 1956. These papers span five generations & include a direct connection to the Revolutionary War and the 1890 Battle of Wounded Knee. A collection overview and inventory is available via this blog post)

U.S. Senate
Preceded by Alexander Ramsey	U.S. senator (Class 1) from Minnesota; 1875–1887; Served alongside: William Windom, Alonzo J. Edgerton, Dwight M. Sabin	Succeeded by Cushman Kellogg Davis
