= List of American sportsperson-politicians =

This is a list of American sportsperson-politicians.

== List ==
Name	Sport	Background	State	Office(s)	Term	Party
Dave Albritton	Track and field	1936 Olympic high jump medal winner	OH	State Representative	1961–1972	Republican
Colin Allred	Football	Played for the Tennessee Titans	TX	U.S. Representative	2019–2025	Democratic
Colin Allred	Football	Played for the Tennessee Titans	TX	Candidate for U.S. Senate	2024, 2026	Democratic
Alan Autry	Football	Played quarterback for the Green Bay Packers (As Carlos Brown)	CA	Mayor of Fresno	2001–2009	Republican
Vic Backlund	Baseball	Played for the Los Angeles Dodgers	OR	State Representative	1999–2005	Republican
Randy Bass	Baseball	Played for five MLB teams from 1977–1982, won the Nippon Professional Baseball Most Valuable Player Award for the Hanshin Tigers in 1985	OK	State Senator	2005–2019	Democratic
Dave Bing	Basketball	Hall of Fame shooting guard at Syracuse University and three NBA teams, including the Detroit Pistons	MI	Mayor of Detroit	2009–2013	Democratic
Brandon Bochenski	Ice hockey	Played wing for the University of North Dakota and several AHL and NHL teams	ND	Mayor of Grand Forks	2020–present	Republican
Bill Bradley	Basketball	Hall of Fame small forward at Princeton University, 1964 Olympic gold medal team, and the New York Knicks	NJ	U.S. Senator	1979–1997	Democratic
Bill Bradley	Basketball	Hall of Fame small forward at Princeton University, 1964 Olympic gold medal team, and the New York Knicks	NJ	Candidate for President	2000	Democratic
Fred H. Brown	Baseball	Outfielder for the Boston Beaneaters	NH	U.S. Attorney	1914–1922	Democratic
Fred H. Brown	Baseball	Outfielder for the Boston Beaneaters	NH	Governor of New Hampshire	1923–1925	Democratic
Fred H. Brown	Baseball	Outfielder for the Boston Beaneaters	NH	U.S. Senator	1933–1939	Democratic
Fred H. Brown	Baseball	Outfielder for the Boston Beaneaters	NH	United States Comptroller General	1939–1940	Democratic
Kam Buckner	Football	Played college football for the Illinois Fighting Illini	IL	Member of the Illinois House of Representatives	2019–present	Democratic
Kam Buckner	Football	Played college football for the Illinois Fighting Illini	IL	Speaker pro tempore of the Illinois House of Representatives	2025–present	Democratic
Kam Buckner	Football	Played college football for the Illinois Fighting Illini	IL	Candidate for Mayor of Chicago	2023	Democratic
Jim Bunning	Baseball	Hall of Fame pitcher with the Detroit Tigers, Philadelphia Phillies, Pittsburgh Pirates, and Los Angeles Dodgers	KY	State Senator	1980–1984	Republican
Jim Bunning	Baseball	Hall of Fame pitcher with the Detroit Tigers, Philadelphia Phillies, Pittsburgh Pirates, and Los Angeles Dodgers	KY	Nominee for Governor	1983	Republican
Jim Bunning	Baseball	Hall of Fame pitcher with the Detroit Tigers, Philadelphia Phillies, Pittsburgh Pirates, and Los Angeles Dodgers	KY	U.S. Representative	1987–1999	Republican
Jim Bunning	Baseball	Hall of Fame pitcher with the Detroit Tigers, Philadelphia Phillies, Pittsburgh Pirates, and Los Angeles Dodgers	KY	U.S. Senator	1999–2011	Republican
Ben Nighthorse Campbell	Judo	Captain of the US team at the 1964 Summer Olympics	CO	State Representative	1983–1987	Democratic (before 1995); Republican (1995–present)
Ben Nighthorse Campbell	Judo	Captain of the US team at the 1964 Summer Olympics	CO	U.S. Representative	1987–1993	Democratic (before 1995); Republican (1995–present)
Ben Nighthorse Campbell	Judo	Captain of the US team at the 1964 Summer Olympics	CO	U.S. Senator	1993–2005	Democratic (before 1995); Republican (1995–present)
John Cherberg	Football	College player and college coach for the Washington Huskies	WA	Lieutenant Governor of Washington	1957–1989	Democratic
Sharice Davids	Mixed martial arts	Fought professionally, 2013–2014	KS	U.S. Representative	2018–present	Democratic
Terry Dehere	Basketball	Seton Hall University, 1989–93; Los Angeles Clippers, Sacramento Kings, and Vancouver Grizzlies, 1993–99	NJ	Councilor of Jersey City	2001–2007	Independent
Terry Dehere	Basketball	Seton Hall University, 1989–93; Los Angeles Clippers, Sacramento Kings, and Vancouver Grizzlies, 1993–99	NJ	Member of the Jersey City Board of Education	2007–present	Independent
LaVern Dilweg	Football	Green Bay Packers, 1927–1934	WI	U.S. Representative	1943–1945	Democratic
Derek Dooley	Football	Played for the Virginia Cavaliers, later head coach of the Tennessee Volunteers	GA	Candidate for U.S. Senate	2026	Republican
Chris Dudley	Basketball	Cleveland Cavaliers, 1987-1990; New Jersey Nets, 1990-1993; Portland Trail Blazers, 1993-1997 and 2001-2003; New York Knicks, 1997-2000; Phoenix Suns, 2000-2001	OR	nominee for Governor	2010	Republican
Arne Duncan	Basketball	Played at Harvard University and went on to play in Australia's National Basketball League from 1987 to 1991	IL	CEO of Chicago Public Schools	2001–2009	Democratic
Arne Duncan	Basketball	Played at Harvard University and went on to play in Australia's National Basketball League from 1987 to 1991	IL	U.S. Secretary of Education	2009–2016	Democratic
Geoff Duncan	Baseball	Played at Georgia Tech and went on to be drafted by the Florida Marlins and play in their farm system from 1996–2000	GA	State Representative	2013–2017	Republican
Geoff Duncan	Baseball	Played at Georgia Tech and went on to be drafted by the Florida Marlins and play in their farm system from 1996–2000	GA	Lieutenant Governor	2019–2023	Republican
Geoff Duncan	Baseball	Played at Georgia Tech and went on to be drafted by the Florida Marlins and play in their farm system from 1996–2000	GA	Candidate for Governor of Georgia	2026	Democratic
Jay Feely	Football	Collegiate and professional placekicker for University of Michigan and seven NFL teams, including the Atlanta Falcons and Arizona Cardinals	AZ	Candidate for U.S. House of Representatives	2026	Republican
Raymond Flynn	Basketball	Professional and collegiate men's basketball player	MA	Member of the Massachusetts House of Representatives	1971–1975 and 1975–1978	Democratic
Raymond Flynn	Basketball	Professional and collegiate men's basketball player	MA	Boston City Councilor	1978–1984	Democratic
Raymond Flynn	Basketball	Professional and collegiate men's basketball player	MA	Mayor of Boston	1984–1993	Democratic
Raymond Flynn	Basketball	Professional and collegiate men's basketball player	MA	United States Ambassador to the Holy See	1993–1997	Democratic
Raymond Flynn	Basketball	Professional and collegiate men's basketball player	MA	Candidate for U.S. House of Representatives	1998	Democratic
Gerald Ford	Football	Center, linebacker, and long snapper for University of Michigan, 1932–1935, assistant varsity football coach for Yale University, 1935–1937, junior varsity head football coach for Yale University, 1938	MI	U.S. Representative	1949–1973	Republican
Gerald Ford	Football	Center, linebacker, and long snapper for University of Michigan, 1932–1935, assistant varsity football coach for Yale University, 1935–1937, junior varsity head football coach for Yale University, 1938	MI	Vice President	1973–1974	Republican
Gerald Ford	Football	Center, linebacker, and long snapper for University of Michigan, 1932–1935, assistant varsity football coach for Yale University, 1935–1937, junior varsity head football coach for Yale University, 1938	MI	President	1974–1977	Republican
Dick Fosbury	Track and field	1968 Olympic high jump gold medal winner	ID	Candidate for State Representative	2014	Democratic
Dick Fosbury	Track and field	1968 Olympic high jump gold medal winner	ID	Blaine County Commissioner	2019–2023	Democratic
Steve Garvey	Baseball	First baseman for the Los Angeles Dodgers and San Diego Padres	CA	Candidate for U.S. Senate	2024	Republican
Napoleon Harris	Football	Collegiate and professional linebacker, played for Northwestern and four NFL teams	IL	Member of the Illinois Senate	2013–present	Democratic
Napoleon Harris	Football	Collegiate and professional linebacker, played for Northwestern and four NFL teams	IL	Supervisor of Thornton Township	2025–present	Democratic
Maura Healey	Basketball	Professional and collegiate women's basketball player	MA	Attorney General of Massachusetts	2015–2023	Democratic
Maura Healey	Basketball	Professional and collegiate women's basketball player	MA	Governor of Massachusetts	2023–present	Democratic
Anthony Gonzalez	Football	Ohio State University, Indianapolis Colts and New England Patriots	OH	U.S. Representative	2019–2023	Republican
Red Grange	Football	Halfback for the Illinois Fighting Illini (collegiate) and the Chicago Bears and New York Yankees (NFL); coach for the Chicago Bears (NFL); co-owner of the New York Yankees (NFL)	IL	Member of the University of Illinois Board of Trustees	1951–1955	Republican
Glenn Jacobs	Professional wrestling	Independent circuit (1992–1995) and in WWE (1995–present), most notably as Kane. Also played football and basketball at Northeast Missouri State University (now Truman State University).	TN	Mayor of Knox County	2018–present	Republican
Edward J. King	Football	Guard and Defensive end for the Buffalo Bills and Baltimore Colts	MA	Governor of Massachusetts	1979–1983	Democratic
Fob James	Football	All-American halfback for Auburn University, 1952–1955 and Montreal Alouettes, 1956	AL	Governor of Alabama	1979–1983	Democratic
Fob James	Football	All-American halfback for Auburn University, 1952–1955 and Montreal Alouettes, 1956	AL	Governor of Alabama	1995–1999	Republican
Caitlyn Jenner	Decathlon	1972 Summer Olympics, 1975 Pan American Games, and 1976 Summer Olympics	CA	Candidate for Governor	2021	Republican
Kevin Johnson	Basketball	University of California, Berkeley, 1983–1987; Cleveland Cavaliers and Phoenix Suns, 1987–2000	CA	Mayor of Sacramento	2008–2016	Democratic
Walter Johnson	Baseball	Hall of Fame pitcher for the Washington Senators, 1907–27	MD	Commissioner of Montgomery County	1938	Republican
Walter Johnson	Baseball	Hall of Fame pitcher for the Washington Senators, 1907–27	MD	Candidate for U.S. House of Representatives	1940	Republican
Hayes Jones	Running	Winner of 110m hurdles at the 1964 Summer Olympics	MI	State Representative	2006	Democratic
Jim Jordan	Wrestling	Two-time NCAA Division I wrestling champion, 1985–1986, assistant wrestling coach for Ohio State University, 1987–1995	OH	State Representative	1995–2000	Republican
Jim Jordan	Wrestling	Two-time NCAA Division I wrestling champion, 1985–1986, assistant wrestling coach for Ohio State University, 1987–1995	OH	State Senator	2001–2006	Republican
Jim Jordan	Wrestling	Two-time NCAA Division I wrestling champion, 1985–1986, assistant wrestling coach for Ohio State University, 1987–1995	OH	U.S. Representative	2007–present	Republican
Ed Kelly	Basketball	Played for the Oshkosh All-Stars of the NBA	IL	General Superintendent of the Chicago Park District	1972–1986	Democratic
Jack Kemp	Football	Played quarterback for the Buffalo Bills, 1962–69	NY	U.S. Representative	1971–1989	Republican
Jack Kemp	Football	Played quarterback for the Buffalo Bills, 1962–69	NY	Candidate for President	1988	Republican
Jack Kemp	Football	Played quarterback for the Buffalo Bills, 1962–69	NY	U.S. Secretary of Housing and Urban Development	1989–1993	Republican
Jack Kemp	Football	Played quarterback for the Buffalo Bills, 1962–69	NY	Nominee for Vice President	1996	Republican
Chris Kluwe	Football	Played punter for the Minnesota Vikings, 2005-2012	CA	Candidate for California State Assembly	2026	Democratic
Michelle Kwan	Figure skating	Two-time Olympic medalist (silver in 1998, bronze in 2002), a five-time World champion (1996, 1998, 2000, 2001, 2003) and a nine-time U.S. champion (1996, 1998–2005)	CA	U.S. Ambassador to Belize	2022–2025	Democratic
Steve Largent	Football	Hall of Fame wide receiver for the Seattle Seahawks, 1976–89	OK	U.S. Representative	1995–2003	Republican
Steve Largent	Football	Hall of Fame wide receiver for the Seattle Seahawks, 1976–89	OK	Nominee for Governor	2002	Republican
Don Lash	Running	Set a world record for the two-mile run in 1936, competed in the 1936 Summer Olympics	IN	State Representative	1973–1982	Republican
Greg Lashutka	Football	Played college football for Ohio State, drafted into the NFL by the Buffalo Bills	OH	Mayor of Columbus	1992–2000	Republican
Johnny Lattner	Football	Halfback for the Notre Dame Fighting Irish (college) and Pittsburgh Steelers (NFL)	IL	Nominee for Cook County Board of Commissioners	1986	Democratic
Bob Mathias	Track and field	Decathlon winner at the Summer Olympics in 1948 and 1952	CA	U.S. Representative	1967–1975	Republican
Tom McMillen	Basketball	Played for the University of Maryland and the Buffalo Braves, New York Knicks, Atlanta Hawks, and Washington Bullets	MD	U.S. Representative	1987–1993	Democratic
Wayne Messam	Football	Wide receiver for Florida State University, and in the NFL for the Cincinnati Bengals, 1997	FL	City Commissioner of Miramar	2011–2015	Democratic
Wayne Messam	Football	Wide receiver for Florida State University, and in the NFL for the Cincinnati Bengals, 1997	FL	Mayor of Miramar	2015–present	Democratic
Wayne Messam	Football	Wide receiver for Florida State University, and in the NFL for the Cincinnati Bengals, 1997	FL	Candidate for President	2020	Democratic
Ralph Metcalfe	Running	Medalist at the 1932 and 1936 Summer Olympics	IL	U.S. Representative	1971–1978	Democratic
Jack Mildren	Football	Quarterback at the University of Oklahoma and with the Baltimore Colts and New England Patriots	OK	Lieutenant Governor	1991–1995	Democratic
Jack Mildren	Football	Quarterback at the University of Oklahoma and with the Baltimore Colts and New England Patriots	OK	Nominee for Governor	1994	Democratic
Wilmer Mizell	Baseball	Pitcher for the St. Louis Cardinals, Pittsburgh Pirates, and New York Mets, 1952–62	NC	U.S. Representative	1969–1975	Republican
Markwayne Mullin	Mixed martial arts	Fought professionally, 2006–2007	OK	U.S. Representative	2013–2023	Republican
Markwayne Mullin	Mixed martial arts	Fought professionally, 2006–2007	OK	U.S. Senator	2023–2026	Republican
Markwayne Mullin	Mixed martial arts	Fought professionally, 2006–2007	OK	U.S. Secretary of Homeland Security	2026–present	Republican
William D. Mullins	Baseball	Pitcher in the Washington Senators minor league system	MA	State Representative	1977–1986	Democratic
Tito Ortiz	Mixed martial arts	Ultimate Fighting Championship	CA	Member of the Huntington Beach City Council	2020–2021	Republican
Tom Osborne	Football	Head football coach for the University of Nebraska, 1973–97; University of Nebraska athletic director, 2007–2013	NE	U.S. Representative	2001–2007	Republican
Tom Osborne	Football	Head football coach for the University of Nebraska, 1973–97; University of Nebraska athletic director, 2007–2013	NE	Candidate for Governor	2006	Republican
Burgess Owens	Football	Safety for the University of Miami (1970–72), New York Jets (1973–79), and Oakland Raiders (1980–82)	UT	U.S. Representative	2021–present	Republican
Rod Paige	Football	Head coach at Jackson State University and Texas Southern University	MS	U.S. Secretary of Education	2001–2005	Republican
Alan Page	Football	Played for University of Notre Dame and the Minnesota Vikings	MN	Associate Justice of the State Supreme Court	1993–2015	Independent
B.J. Penn	Mixed martial arts	Mixed martial artist and Brazilian Jiu-Jitsu practitioner	HI	Candidate for Governor	2022	Republican
Harold Pogue	Football	Collegiate quarterback and halfback for the Illinois Fighting Illini	IL	Member of the University of Illinois Board of Trustees	1935–1941 and 1959–1969	Democratic
Harold Pogue	Football	Collegiate quarterback and halfback for the Illinois Fighting Illini	IL	President of the University of Illinois Board of Trustees	1940–1941	Democratic
Harold Pogue	Football	Collegiate quarterback and halfback for the Illinois Fighting Illini	IL	Member of the Decatur City Council	1959–1963	Democratic
Tom Pridemore	Football	Played for Atlanta Falcons	WV	Delegate in the West Virginia House of Delegates	1981–1983	Democrat
Jon Runyan	Football	Offensive tackle for University of Michigan, and in the NFL for the Tennessee Titans (1996–99), Philadelphia Eagles (2000–08), and San Diego Chargers (2009)	NJ	U.S. Representative	2011–2015	Republican
Ed Rutkowski	Football	Wide receiver and later quarterback for the Buffalo Bills of the American Football League, 1963–68	NY	Executive of Erie County	1979–1987	Republican
Ed Rutkowski	Football	Wide receiver and later quarterback for the Buffalo Bills of the American Football League, 1963–68	NY	Deputy Commissioner of the State Office of Parks, Recreation and Historic Preservation	1995–2006	Republican
Jim Ryun	Running	The last American to hold the world record in the mile run, competitor in the 1964, 1968, and 1972 Summer Olympics, first high schooler to break the four-minute mile	KS	U.S. Representative	1996–2007	Republican
Jim Schwantz	Football	Linebacker for Purdue University, and in the NFL for the Chicago Bears, Dallas Cowboys, and San Francisco 49ers	IL	Mayor of Palatine	2009–present	Independent
Arnold Schwarzenegger	Bodybuilding	Mr. Olympia from 1970 to 1973	CA	Governor	2003–2011	Republican
Pius Schwert	Baseball	Catcher for the Penn Quakers and New York Yankees	NY	Clerk of Erie County	1934–1938	Democratic
Pius Schwert	Baseball	Catcher for the Penn Quakers and New York Yankees	NY	U.S. Representative	1939–1941	Democratic
J. D. Scholten	Baseball	Pitcher for the Sioux City Explorers of the American Association of Professional Baseball	IA	Member of the Iowa Senate	2023–present	Democratic
J. D. Scholten	Baseball	Pitcher for the Sioux City Explorers of the American Association of Professional Baseball	IA	Nominee for the U.S. House of Representatives	2018 and 2022	Democratic
J. D. Scholten	Baseball	Pitcher for the Sioux City Explorers of the American Association of Professional Baseball	IA	Candidate for the U.S. Senate	2026	Democratic
Heath Shuler	Football	Played for the University of Tennessee and the New Orleans Saints and Oakland Raiders	NC	U.S. Representative	2007–2013	Democratic
David Tangipa	Football	Played for Fresno State	CA	State Assemblyman	2024–present	Republican
Mark Teixeira	Baseball	Three-time MLB All-Star, played for four teams including the Texas Rangers and New York Yankees	TX	U.S. Representative	2027–present	Republican
John K. Tener	Baseball	Played for the Orioles in 1885, Chicago White Stockings from 1888 to 1889, and the Pittsburgh Burghers for the 1890 season.	PA	U.S. Representative	1909–1911	Republican
John K. Tener	Baseball	Played for the Orioles in 1885, Chicago White Stockings from 1888 to 1889, and the Pittsburgh Burghers for the 1890 season.	PA	Governor	1911–1915	Republican
Jim Thomas	Tennis	Highest ATP world singles ranking was number 288	OH	State Representative	2023–present	Republican
Robert R. Thomas	Football	NFL kicker	IL	Judge of the circuit court of DuPage County	1988–1994	Republican
Robert R. Thomas	Football	NFL kicker	IL	Chief judge of the circuit court of DuPage County	1989–1994	Republican
Robert R. Thomas	Football	NFL kicker	IL	Judge of the 2nd district of the Illinois Appellate Court	1994–2000	Republican
Robert R. Thomas	Football	NFL kicker	IL	Justice of the Supreme Court of Illinois	2000–2020	Republican
Robert R. Thomas	Football	NFL kicker	IL	Chief justice of the Supreme Court of Illinois	2005–2008	Republican
William Hale Thompson	Football and water polo	Captained the Chicago Athletic Association's teams	IL	Member of the Chicago City Council	1900–1902	Republican
William Hale Thompson	Football and water polo	Captained the Chicago Athletic Association's teams	IL	Member of the Cook County Board of Commissioners	1902–1904	Republican
William Hale Thompson	Football and water polo	Captained the Chicago Athletic Association's teams	IL	Mayor of Chicago	1915–1923 and 1927–1931	Republican
William Hale Thompson	Football and water polo	Captained the Chicago Athletic Association's teams	IL	Candidate for U.S. Senate	1918	Republican
William Hale Thompson	Football and water polo	Captained the Chicago Athletic Association's teams	IL	Candidate for President	1928	Republican
Jim Tressel	Football	Played for Baldwin Wallace University; assistant coach at University of Akron, Miami University, Syracuse University, and the Ohio State University; head coach at Youngstown State University and the Ohio State University	OH	Lieutenant Governor of Ohio	2025–present	Republican
Tommy Tuberville	Football	Played for Southern Arkansas University; assistant coach at Arkansas State University, the University of Miami, and Texas A&M University; head coach at the University of Mississippi, Auburn University, Texas Tech University, and the University of Cincinnati	AL	U.S. Senator	2021–2027	Republican
Tommy Tuberville	Football	Played for Southern Arkansas University; assistant coach at Arkansas State University, the University of Miami, and Texas A&M University; head coach at the University of Mississippi, Auburn University, Texas Tech University, and the University of Cincinnati	AL	Governor of Alabama	2027–present	Republican
Scott Turner	Football	Played for the Washington Commanders, San Diego Chargers, and Denver Broncos	TX	Member of the Texas House of Representatives	2013–2017	Republican
Scott Turner	Football	Played for the Washington Commanders, San Diego Chargers, and Denver Broncos	TX	U.S. Secretary of Housing and Urban Development	2025–present	Republican
Josh Turek	Basketball	Three-time wheelchair basketball medalist at the Summer Paralympic Games (bronze in 2012, gold in 2016 and 2020), four time competitor (2004, 2012, 2016, 2020), 2023 NWBA Hall of Fame inductee	IA	Member of the Iowa House of Representatives	2023–2027	Democratic
Josh Turek	Basketball	Three-time wheelchair basketball medalist at the Summer Paralympic Games (bronze in 2012, gold in 2016 and 2020), four time competitor (2004, 2012, 2016, 2020), 2023 NWBA Hall of Fame inductee	IA	U.S. Senator	2027–present	Democratic
Mo Udall	Basketball	Played for the University of Arizona, and later with the Denver Nuggets for one year	AZ	U.S. Representative	1961–1991	Democratic
Jesse Ventura	Professional wrestling	American Wrestling Association and World Wrestling Federation	MN	Mayor of Brooklyn Park	1991–1995	Independence
Jesse Ventura	Professional wrestling	American Wrestling Association and World Wrestling Federation	MN	Governor	1999–2003	Independence
Herschel Walker	Football	National Football League	GA	Candidate for U.S. Senator	2021–22	Republican
Herschel Walker	Football	National Football League	GA	U.S. Ambassador to the Bahamas	2025–present	Republican
Nathan Walton	Basketball	Played college basketball for Princeton Tigers men's basketball	CA	Candidate for Governor of California	2003	Independent
J. C. Watts	Football	Played for University of Oklahoma and the Ottawa Rough Riders	OK	U.S. Representative	1995–2003	Republican
Byron White	Football	Played for NFL teams Detroit Lions and Pittsburgh Steelers during 1938 and 1941	CO	U.S. Deputy Attorney General	1961–1962	Democratic
Byron White	Football	Played for NFL teams Detroit Lions and Pittsburgh Steelers during 1938 and 1941	CO	Associate Justice of the U.S. Supreme Court	1962–1993	Democratic
Frank White	Baseball	World Series champion who played for the Kansas City Royals for 18 years.	MO	Member of the Jackson County Legislature	2014–2016	Democratic
Frank White	Baseball	World Series champion who played for the Kansas City Royals for 18 years.	MO	Executive of Jackson County	2016–2025	Democratic
Royce White	Basketball	Played in the NBA, Basketball Super League, and Big3.	MN	Candidate for Senate	2024	Republican
Dwayne Woodruff	Football	Cornerback with the Pittsburgh Steelers (1979–1990)	PA	Judge of the Allegheny County Court of Common Pleas	2005–present	Independent

== See also ==
- List of sportsperson-politicians (international list)
