= Robert Sheran =

American judge

The Honorable Robert J. Sheran
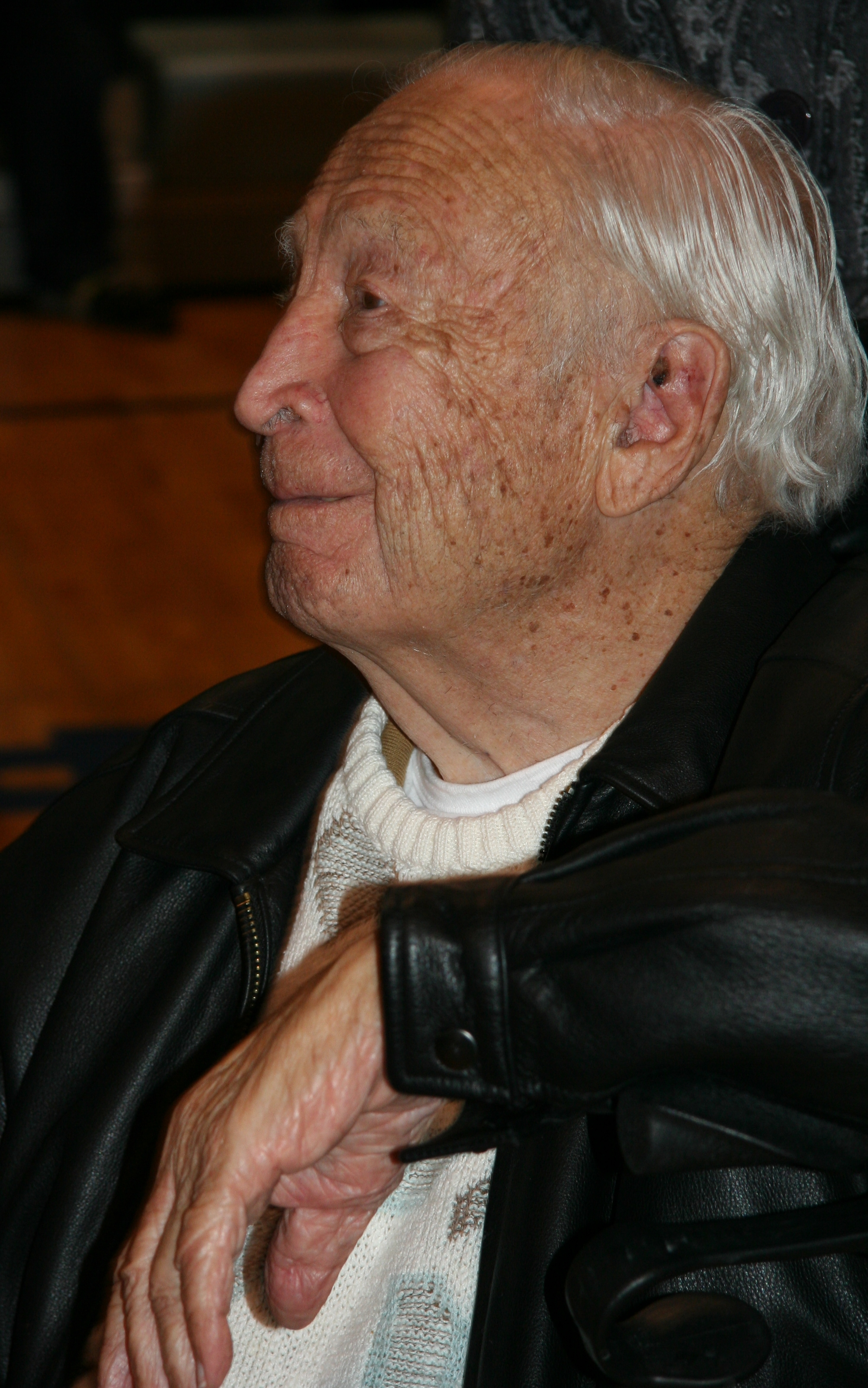

Chief Justice Minnesota Supreme Court
- In office 1973–1981
- Appointed by: Wendell Anderson
- Preceded by: Oscar Knutson
- Succeeded by: Douglas K. Amdahl

Associate Justice Minnesota Supreme Court
- In office 1963–1970
- Appointed by: Elmer Andersen

Personal details
- Born: January 2, 1916 Waseca, Minnesota, U.S.
- Died: January 25, 2012 (aged 96) Bloomington, Minnesota, U.S.
- Party: Democratic-Farmer-Labor Party
- Spouse(s): Jean Brown; five children

Robert Joseph Sheran (January 2, 1916 – January 25, 2012) was an American lawyer, politician, and judge. He was appointed Chief Justice of the Minnesota Supreme Court by Governor Wendell Anderson, serving from December 1973 to December 1981. He previously served as an associate justice on the court from January 1963 to July 1970, appointed by Governor Elmer L. Andersen. He is the only person to have been appointed to two separate tenures on the Minnesota Supreme Court by different governors.

== Early life and education ==
Sheran graduated from Roosevelt High School in Minneapolis in 1932, then attended St. Thomas College in Saint Paul, receiving his B.A. in 1936. He went on to the University of Minnesota Law School, graduating with his LL.B. in 1939.

== Career ==
He worked as a special agent with the Federal Bureau of Investigation from 1942 to 1945, guarding the secrets of the Manhattan Project. He practiced law with the Farrish Johnson Law Office in Mankato from 1945 to 1963. He also served in the Minnesota House of Representatives from 1947 to 1950, representing the old District 8, which encompassed Blue Earth County. He was elected as a Conservative in 1946, and as a Liberal in 1948.

A Democrat, Sheran was appointed to the Supreme Court by Republican Gov. Elmer L. Andersen, who called him "one of the greatest jurists in state history". Sheran resigned from the court in 1970, in part because he was unable to pay his children's college tuition on a justice's $20,000 salary. In 1973, he accepted an appointment to replace Oscar R. Knutson as chief justice by DFL Gov. Wendell Anderson, who later called Sheran his best appointment. After retiring from the court in 1981, Sheran practiced with the Minneapolis firm of Lindquist & Vennum for 20 years. He was also instrumental in organizing the Minnesota Court of Appeals after its creation in 1982.

In 2007, Sheran was named by Minnesota Law and Politics magazine as one of the 100 most influential lawyers in the history of the state.

== Family ==
Sheran's daughter, Kathy, was a Minnesota state senator, representing District 23, which includes portions of Blue Earth, Nicollet and Sibley counties.
