= Leonard E. Lindquist =

American politician (1912–2004)

Member of the Minnesota House of Representatives
- In office 1955–1958

Personal details
- Born: September 5, 1912 Minneapolis, Minnesota, U.S.
- Died: September 10, 2004 (aged 92) Minneapolis, Minnesota, U.S.
- Party: Republican

Leonard E. Lindquist (September 5, 1912 – September 10, 2004) was an American lawyer and politician.

Lindquist was born in Minneapolis, Minnesota. He served in the United States Navy during World War II. Lindquist received his law degree from the University of Minnesota Law School and practiced law in Minneapolis, where he co-founded the firm later known as Lindquist & Vennum in 1946.

He lived in Minneapolis with his wife and family. Lindquist served in the Minnesota House of Representatives from 1955 to 1958 and was a Republican. He unsuccessfully ran for Congress as a Republican for Minnesota's 3rd congressional district in 1958. He lost the Republican nomination for the same district in 1960. He died at Northwestern Hospital Hospital, in Minneapolis, from complications from a fall. His funeral and burial was in Minneapolis.
