= Charles Macomb Flandrau =

American author and essayist

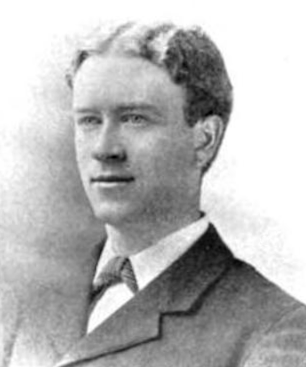
- Born: December 9, 1871; St. Paul, Minnesota, US
- Died: March 28, 1938 (aged 66); St. Paul, Minnesota, US
- Education: Harvard University
- Occupation: Writer
- Parents: Charles Eugene Flandrau (father); Rebecca Blair Flandrau (mother)

Charles Macomb Flandrau (1871–1938), was an American author and essayist.

== Early life and education ==
Flandrau was born on December 9, 1871, in St. Paul, Minnesota. He was the son of Judge Charles Eugene Flandrau and his second wife Rebecca Blair Flandrau. He had a younger brother, William Blair McClure Flandrau. Charles attended school in St. Paul in his lower years, and went to Massachusetts for college, graduating from Harvard University (1895), where he was a student of Charles Townsend Copeland. He was editor of the Harvard's Monthly and the Advocate. He was a member of the Lampoon, the Hasty Pudding Club and The Delphic Club.

== Career ==
In his early post-college years, Flandrau taught English literature at Harvard College (1895–1896), tutored overseas (1896), and was an editor for The Youth's Companion in New York City (1897).

Flandrau published his debut novel, Harvard Episodes (1897), which was a collection of stories about contemporary college life. It was said to be "the first realistic description of undergraduate life in American colleges" and its first printing sold out in a few weeks. That success encouraged Flandrau to write a second book about college, The Diary of a Freshman (1901).

George Horace Lorimer commissioned Flandrau to write several stories which were published in the Saturday Evening Post, Bellman, and other magazines. From 1899 to 1902 he was one of the most popular contributors to the Post.

After an extended visit to his brother William's Mexican coffee plantation, Flandrau wrote Viva Mexico! (1908). This travel book was critically acclaimed for its observations of social customs and political life under Mexican president Porfirio Díaz.

Flandrau's other books include Prejudices (1911), and, later, Loquacities (1931) and Sophomores Abroad (1935).

From 1915 to 1920, Flandrau was drama and music critic for the St. Paul Pioneer Press. He contributed other articles to the Pioneer Press and the St. Paul Dispatch. In St. Paul, he was at the center of the Nimbus Club, a group of writers, artists, and patrons in the city. He recognized talent and acted as a mentor to younger writers.

Financially independent, in 1924, Flandrau divided his time between Majorca, Spain, and his family home in St. Paul. He also lived for a time in Paris and in Normandy, France.

Charles Macomb Flandrau never married. He died in St. Paul on March 28, 1938.

== Legacy ==
Larry Haeg published a biography of Flandrau entitled In Gatsby's Shadow: The Story of Charles Macomb Flandrau (2004), published by University of Iowa Press. Haeg ranks Flandrau with great writers from St. Paul, including F. Scott Fitzgerald and Sinclair Lewis. But he notes that Flandrau seemed to pull back from the career suggested by early demonstrations of his talent, and lived a very private life.

== Works ==
- Harvard Episodes (1897)
- The Diary of a Freshman (1901)
- Viva Mexico! (1908)
- Prejudices (1911)
- Loquacities (1931)
- Sophomores Abroad (1935)
