= Lawrence R. Yetka =

American judge

Associate Justice of the Minnesota Supreme Court
- In office June 2, 1973 – January 4, 1993
- Appointed by: Wendell Anderson
- Preceded by: Robert Sheran
- Succeeded by: Alan Page

Member of the Minnesota House of Representatives from the 54th district
- In office January 2, 1951 – January 2, 1961

Personal details
- Born: October 1, 1924 Cloquet, Minnesota, U.S.
- Died: November 12, 2017 (aged 93) Cloquet, Minnesota, U.S.
- Party: Democratic
- Spouse: Ellen Carter (m. 1950)
- Children: 3
- Education: University of Minnesota (BA, JD)

Lawrence Robert Yetka (October 1, 1924 – November 12, 2017) was an associate justice of the Minnesota Supreme Court and a member of the Minnesota House of Representatives.

Yetka was born in Cloquet, Minnesota. He graduated from the University of Minnesota Law School in 1948, and served in the Minnesota House of Representatives from 1951 to 1961. He became a special municipal judge in 1961, and served until he became Cloquet City Attorney in 1964.

Yetka was appointed to the Supreme Court in 1973 by Gov. Wendell Anderson, replacing Robert Sheran, who had been promoted to chief justice after the retirement of Chief Justice Oscar Knutson. Yetka served on the Minnesota Supreme Court until his retirement in 1993. He died on November 12, 2017.

== External documents ==
- Staff of the Minnesota State Law Library, ed. (1996). The political, professional and judicial career of Lawrence R. Yetka. Minnesota Justices series. St. Paul, MN: Minnesota State Law Library. OCLC 35987880. LCC KFM5912.A73 P7 no.9.
- "SUPREME COURT: An Inventory of the Files of Justice Lawrence Yetka" (PDF). Minnesota Historical Society. May 14, 2009.
- "LAWRENCE R. YETKA: An Inventory of His Papers". Minnesota Historical Society. July 2, 2014.

Legal offices
Preceded by Robert Sheran	Associate Justice, Minnesota Supreme Court; 1973-1993	Succeeded by Alan Page
