= Mark H. Dunnell =

American politician

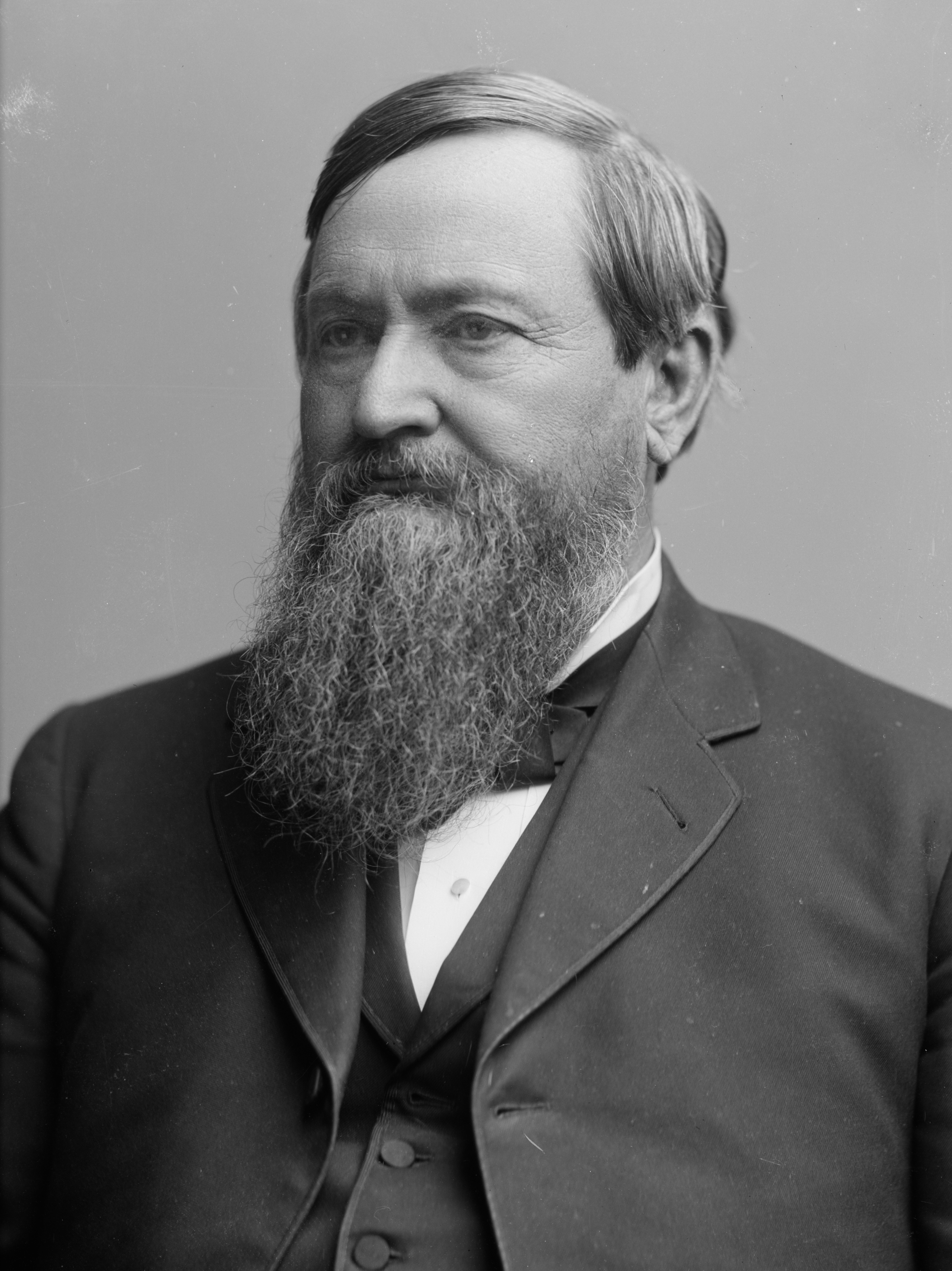
- Dunnell c. 1873–1890

Member of the U.S. House of Representatives from Minnesota's 1st district
- In office March 4, 1889 – March 3, 1891
- Preceded by: Thomas Wilson
- Succeeded by: William H. Harries
- In office March 4, 1871 – March 3, 1883
- Preceded by: Morton S. Wilkinson
- Succeeded by: Milo White

Member of the Maine House of Representatives from the 13th district
- In office 1855–1857

Personal details
- Born: Mark Hill Dunnell; February 7, 1823 Buxton, Maine, U.S.
- Died: September 8, 1904 (aged 81) Owatonna, Minnesota, U.S.
- Party: Republican

Military service
- Allegiance: United States • Union
- Branch/service: Union Army
- Battles/wars: American Civil War

Mark Hill Dunnell (July 2, 1823 – August 9, 1904) was a member of the U.S. House of Representatives from Minnesota from 1871 to 1883 and from 1889 to 1891.

== Biography ==
Born in Buxton, York County, Maine, he completed preparatory studies, and was graduated from Waterville College (now Colby College), Waterville, Maine, in 1849. For five years he was principal of the Norway and Hebron Academies. He became a member of the Maine House of Representatives in 1854 and served in the Maine Senate in 1855. He served as state superintendent of common schools in 1855 and 1857 – 1859. He was a delegate to the Republican National Convention in 1856. He studied law, was admitted to the bar in 1856 and commenced practice in Portland, Maine, in 1860. He entered the Union Army as colonel of the 5th Maine Volunteer Infantry Regiment, May 6, 1861, but mustered out on August 31, 1861. He served as United States consul at Vera Cruz, Mexico, in 1861 and 1862.

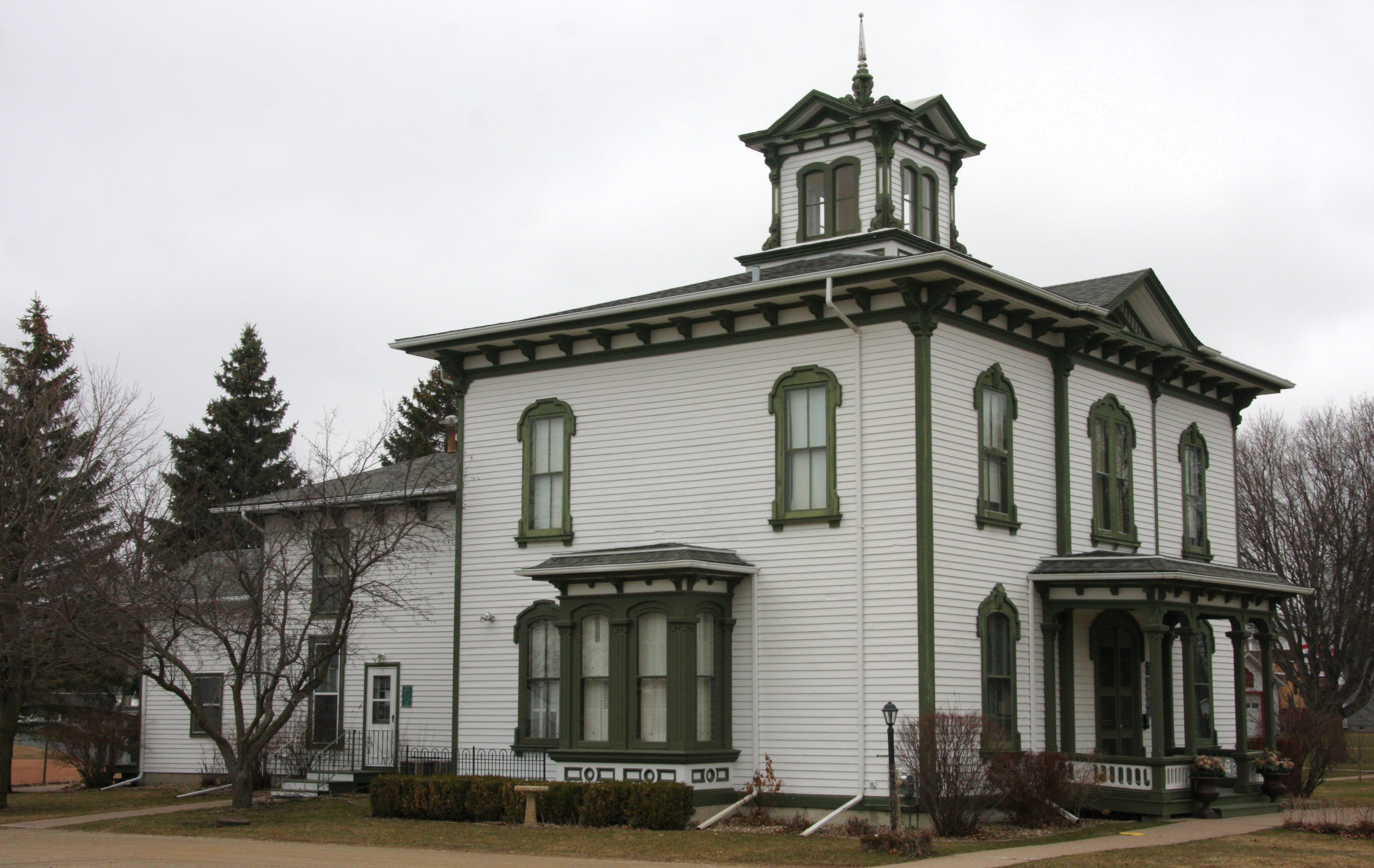
Home Dunnell built and lived in, now part of a museum in Owatonna, Minnesota.

Dunnell moved to Minnesota in 1865, settling first in Winona, in 1865, and moving to Owatonna in 1867. He became a member of the Minnesota House of Representatives in 1867 and served as state superintendent of public instruction from April 2, 1867, to August 1870, when he resigned.

He was elected as a Republican to the 42nd, 43rd, 44th, 45th, 46th, and 47th Congresses, (March 4, 1871 – March 3, 1883); unsuccessful candidate for Speaker of the Forty-Seventh Congress; was not a candidate for renomination in 1882; unsuccessful candidate for election to the United States Senate in 1883; elected to the 51st Congress, (March 4, 1889 – March 3, 1891); unsuccessful candidate for reelection in 1890 to the 52nd Congress; delegate to the Republican National Convention in 1892.

He was one of the founders and a member of the board of trustees of Minnesota Academy, a high school for boys and girls in Owatonna, being renamed Pillsbury Academy in 1887, and becoming a military academy for high school boys only in 1920.

Dunnell died in Owatonna in 1904 and is buried in Forest Hill Cemetery. He is the namesake of the city of Dunnell, Minnesota.

U.S. House of Representatives
Preceded by Morton S. Wilkinson	U.S. Representative from Minnesota's 1st congressional district 1871–1883	Succeeded by Milo White
Preceded by Thomas Wilson	U.S. Representative from Minnesota's 1st congressional district 1889–1891	Succeeded by William H. Harries
