= Milo White =

American politician (1830–1913)

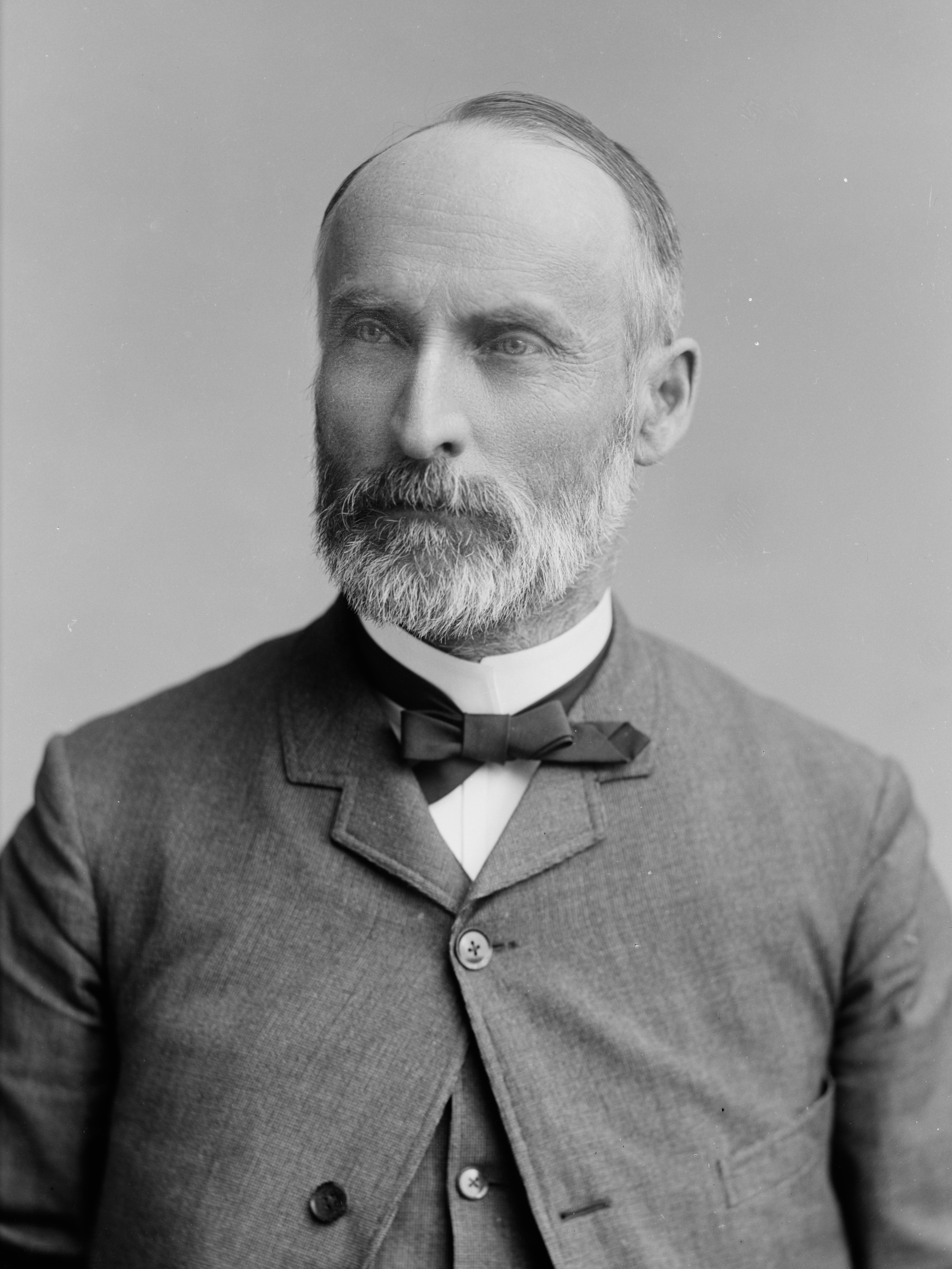
- White c. 1873 – c. 1890

Member of the U.S. House of Representatives from Minnesota's 1st district
- In office March 4, 1883 – March 3, 1887
- Preceded by: Mark H. Dunnell
- Succeeded by: Thomas Wilson

Member of the Minnesota Senate from the 9th district
- In office January 2, 1872 – January 1, 1877
- Preceded by: Charles Hill
- Succeeded by: Burr Deuel
- In office January 4, 1881 – January 1, 1883
- Preceded by: Orin H. Page
- Succeeded by: Samuel D. Peterson

Personal details
- Born: August 17, 1830 Fletcher, Vermont, U.S.
- Died: May 18, 1913 (aged 82) Chatfield, Minnesota, U.S.
- Party: Republican

Milo White (August 17, 1830 – May 18, 1913) was an American businessman and politician who served as a United States representative from Minnesota.

== Early life ==
White was born in Fletcher, Vermont, on August 17, 1830. He attended local schools and Bakersfield Academy. He moved to Chatfield, Minnesota, in 1855 and engaged in mercantile pursuits.

== Career ==
White served as the chairman of Chatfield's board of supervisors when the city was organized in 1858. He served in the Minnesota Senate from 1872 to 1876, and again from 1881 to 1882. He was elected as a Republican to the Forty-eighth and Forty-ninth congresses (March 4, 1883 – March 3, 1887). After leaving Congress he resumed his mercantile pursuits.

White was an unsuccessful candidate for election in 1898 to the Fifty-sixth congress. He served as mayor of Chatfield for several terms, and also served as a member of the Chatfield school board.

== Death ==
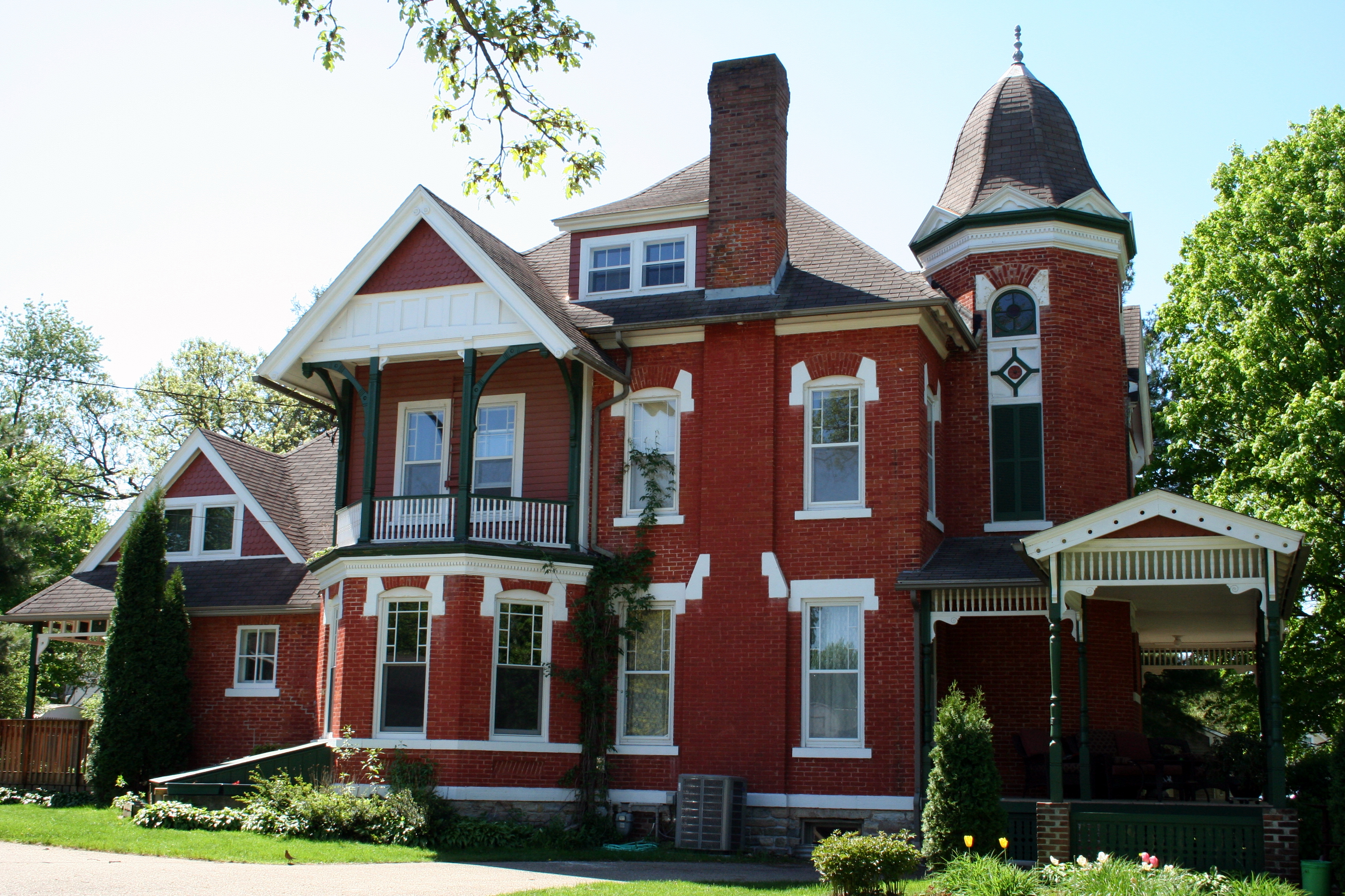
White's house in Chatfield

White died in Chatfield on May 18, 1913. He was buried at Chatfield Cemetery in Chatfield.

U.S. House of Representatives
Preceded by Mark H. Dunnell	U.S. Representative from Minnesota's 1st congressional district 1883 – 1887	Succeeded by Thomas Wilson
