= LaFayette Emmett =

American judge

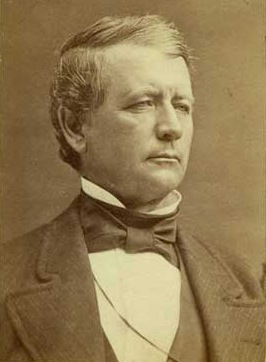
- Emmett C. 1860

Chief Justice of the Minnesota Supreme Court
- In office 1858–1865
- Nominated by: Henry Hastings Sibley
- Preceded by: Position created
- Succeeded by: Thomas Wilson

Personal details
- Born: May 8, 1822 Mount Vernon, Ohio
- Died: August 10, 1905 (aged 83) Santa Fe, New Mexico
- Party: Democratic

LaFayette Emmett (May 8, 1822 – August 10, 1905) was an American lawyer and an early leader in Minnesota law. He was the second attorney general of the Minnesota Territory from 1853 to 1858 and the first chief justice of the state supreme court, serving from 1858 to 1865.

== Early life ==
Emmett was born and raised in Ohio, died in Santa Fe, New Mexico, and was buried in Faribault, Minnesota. He had nine children and was the father-in-law of Miguel Antonio Otero, who was governor of the New Mexico Territory from 1897 to 1906. His brother Dan Emmett is known for composing "Dixie".

== Career ==
In the divided convention which drafted the Minnesota Constitution, he served as a Democrat and advocated the popular election of judges, a position that was adopted. He said, "if the people are incapable of selecting their judges, they are also incapable of selecting the man who is to appoint the judges."
