= Christopher G. Ripley =

American lawyer and judge (1822–1881)

The Honourable Christopher G. Ripley
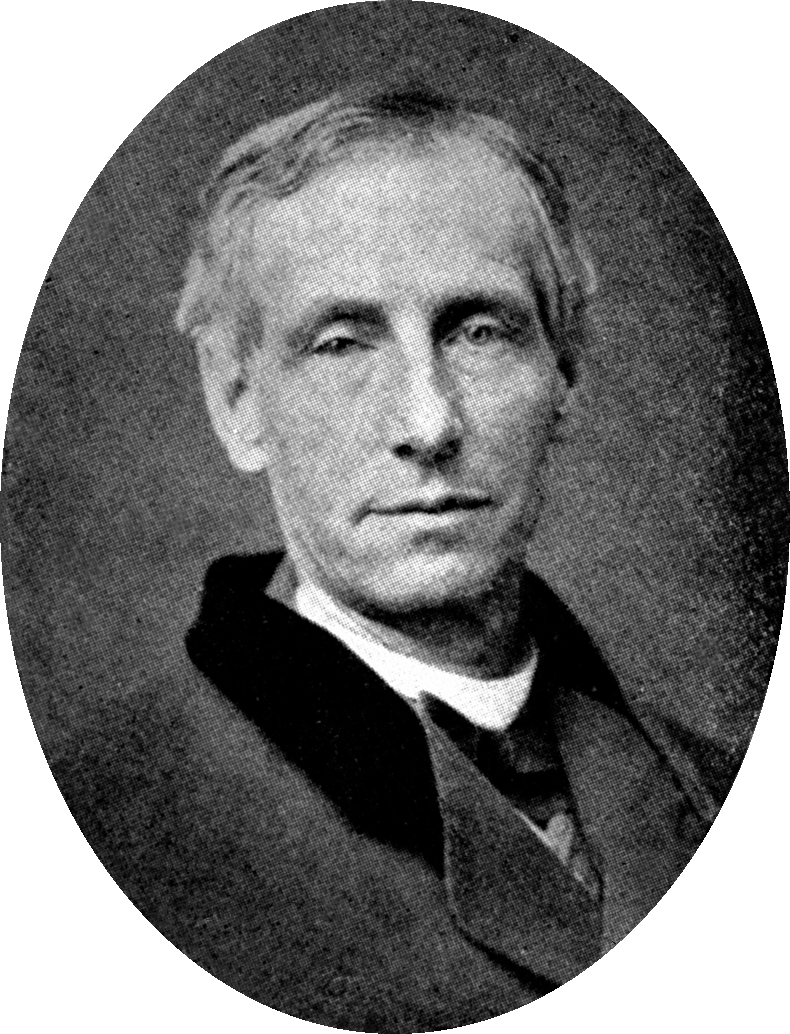

4th Chief Justice of the Minnesota Supreme Court
- In office January 7, 1870 – April 7, 1874
- Preceded by: James Gilfillan
- Succeeded by: Samuel J. R. McMillan

Personal details
- Born: Christopher Gore Ripley; September 6, 1822 Waltham, Mass., USA
- Died: October 15, 1881 (aged 59) Concord, Mass., USA
- Education: Harvard University; Harvard Law School

Christopher G. Ripley (September 6, 1822 – October 15, 1881) was an American lawyer and judge of Minnesota. He served as Chief Justice of the Minnesota Supreme Court from January 7, 1870 to April 7, 1874.

His father, Rev. Samuel Ripley, was a Unitarian minister. His mother was the daughter of Captain Gamaliel Bradford. Ripley attended Harvard University and graduated in 1841, and attended Harvard Law School for a year. He then worked with celebrated lawyer Franklin Dexter in Boston before moving to Minnesota. He first moved to Brownsville in 1855, but then moved to Chatfield a year later.

Ripley was elected Chief Justice of the Minnesota Supreme Court for a term starting January 7, 1870, but on April 7, 1874, his failing health forced him to resign. He died October 15, 1881, in Concord, Massachusetts.
