= 11th Minnesota Infantry Regiment =

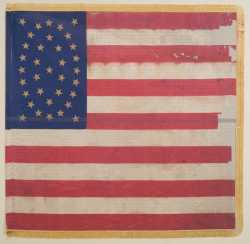
- Eleventh Minnesota Infantry Regiment National Flag
- Active: August, 1864 to July 11, 1865
- Country: United States
- Allegiance: Union
- Branch: Infantry
- Engagements: None

Commanders
- Notable commanders: Col. James B. Gilfillan

The 11th Minnesota Infantry Regiment was a Minnesota USV infantry regiment that served in the Union Army during the American Civil War. It was the last infantry regiment to be raised by Minnesota during the war.

== History ==
=== Organization and early service ===
The 11th Minnesota Infantry Regiment was formed in response to President Lincoln's last call for troops in late 1864. The regiment was mustered into Federal service at Fort Snelling, Minnesota, between August and September 1864. Its original term of service was for three-years.

Organization of Regiment in 1864.
Company	Primary place of recruitment	Earliest Captain
A	Carver County and Sibley County	Adam Buck
B	Ramsey County and Dakota County	Franklin Paine
C	No county listed	Theodore E. Potter
D	No county listed	Loren Albert Webb
E	No county listed	Joseph Harley
F	No county listed	John W. Plummer
G	No county listed	Harrison M. Angier
H	No county listed	Jeseph S. Eaton
I	No county listed	Charles E. Thurber
K	No county listed	George F. Tyler

=== Service in the Department of the Cumberland ===
After training and equipping, the 11th received orders to report to the Department of the Cumberland around the Nashville, Tennessee area. Here, the regiment was tasked with protecting the Louisville-Nashville railroad; a thirty-mile stretch. Occasionally, the troops would engage in skirmishes with Confederate guerillas and raiders. However, the 11th would not take part in any notable engagements, though some men are said to have heard or witnessed the Battle of Nashville, which several other Minnesota regiments fought in.

=== End of service ===
After serving in the Nashville area for the remainder of the war, the 11th Minnesota was finally sent home on June 26, 1865 and discharged at St. Paul, Minnesota, on July 11. The regiment was the last infantry unit to be raised by the state of Minnesota until the Spanish-American War in 1898.

== Casualties ==
The 11th Minnesota Infantry suffered 3 enlisted men killed in action or who later died of their wounds, plus another 1 officer and 21 enlisted men who died of disease, for a total of 25 fatalities.

== Colonels ==
- Col. James B. Gilfillian - November 3, 1864, to June 26, 1865.

== See also ==
List of Minnesota Civil War Units
