= William H. Harries =

19th century American politicians

William Harries
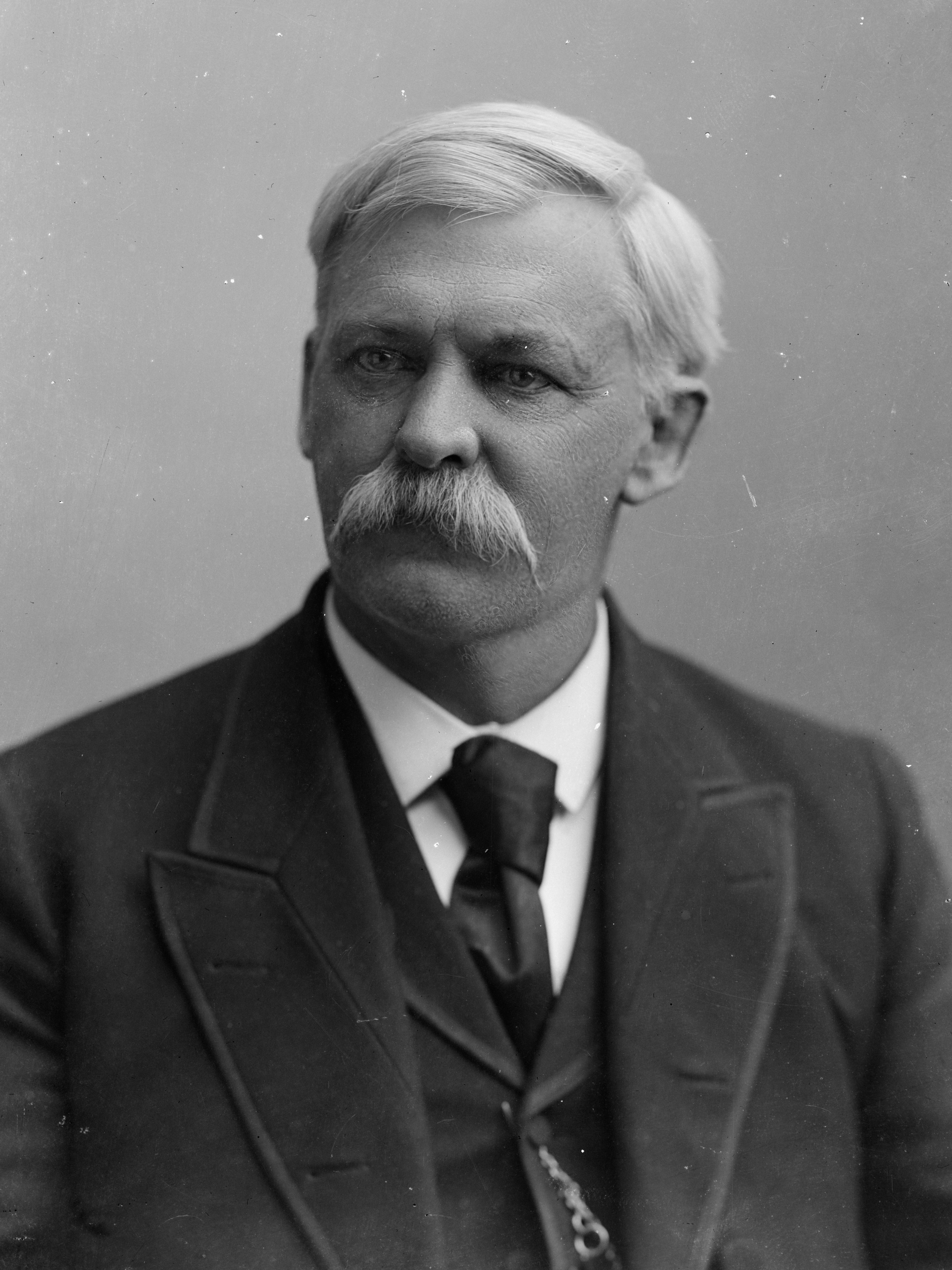
- Harries c. 1891–1894

Member of the U.S. House of Representatives from Minnesota's 1st district
- In office March 4, 1891 – March 3, 1893
- Preceded by: Mark H. Dunnell
- Succeeded by: James Albertus Tawney

Personal details
- Born: January 15, 1843 Dayton, Ohio, U.S.
- Died: July 23, 1921 (aged 78) Seattle, Washington, U.S.
- Resting place: Evergreen Cemetery, Caledonia, Minnesota
- Party: Democratic
- Spouse(s): Austis Dunbar, Hattie Dunbar
- Education: University of Michigan law school
- Profession: lawyer

Military service
- Allegiance: United States
- Branch/service: United States Volunteers; Union Army; Veteran Reserve Corps
- Years of service: 1861–1866
- Rank: 1st Lieutenant, USV; Captain, VRC
- Unit: 2nd Reg. Wis. Vol. Infantry; 3rd Reg. U.S. Veteran Infantry
- Battles/wars: American Civil War

William Henry Harries (January 15, 1843 – July 23, 1921) was an American lawyer and Democratic politician. He was a United States House of Representatives member, representing Minnesota during the Fifty-second Congress. Earlier, he served in the famed Iron Brigade of the Army of the Potomac through most of the American Civil War.

== Early life ==
Harries was born near Dayton, Ohio. He moved to La Crosse, Wisconsin, and enlisted as a private in Company B, 2nd Wisconsin Infantry Regiment on April 18, 1861. He was wounded at the Battle of Antietam. He was commissioned captain of Company F, Third Regiment, United States Veteran Volunteers, General Hancock's corps, on December 21, 1864, and was honorably discharged on April 17, 1866.

== Legal career ==
Harries graduated from the University of Michigan at Ann Arbor law school in 1868. He was admitted to the bar in 1868, and commenced practice in Hokah, Minnesota. He later practiced in Caledonia, Minnesota. He served as prosecuting attorney of Houston County, Minnesota, from 1874 to 1878.

== Political career ==
He was elected as a Democrat to the Fifty-second Congress and served from March 4, 1891, to March 3, 1893. Harries was an unsuccessful candidate for reelection in 1892 to the Fifty-third Congress. He was then appointed by President Grover Cleveland as collector of internal revenue for Minnesota and served from 1894 to 1898, residing in St. Paul, Minnesota.

== Later years ==
He resumed his law practice in Caledonia, Minnesota, in 1898. He served as president of the village of Caledonia and a member of its board of education, department commander of the Minnesota department of the Grand Army of the Republic in 1901, member of the board of trustees of the Minnesota Soldiers' Home in 1903, secretary of the board 1907 to 1911, and commandant of the home 1911 to 1918. Harries died in Seattle, Washington, on July 23, 1921, and is interred in Evergreen Cemetery, Caledonia, Minnesota.

== Personal life ==
Capt. Harries married Austis L. Dunbar in 1870, and after she died he married her sister Hattie Hadley Dunbar in 1882. Hattie died in 1895. The father of these two sisters was William F. Dunbar, the first state auditor of Minnesota. The eleven children of these two marriages are Mary Lucretia, Anna Belle, Ethelind, Paul W., Anstice, Hattie, George, Alice, Beth Bernice, Edna Beatrice, and Donald Dunbar.

U.S. House of Representatives
Preceded by Mark H. Dunnell	U.S. Representative from Minnesota's 1st congressional district 1891–1893	Succeeded by James Albertus Tawney
