= James A. Tawney =

American politician (1855–1919)

James Albertus Tawney
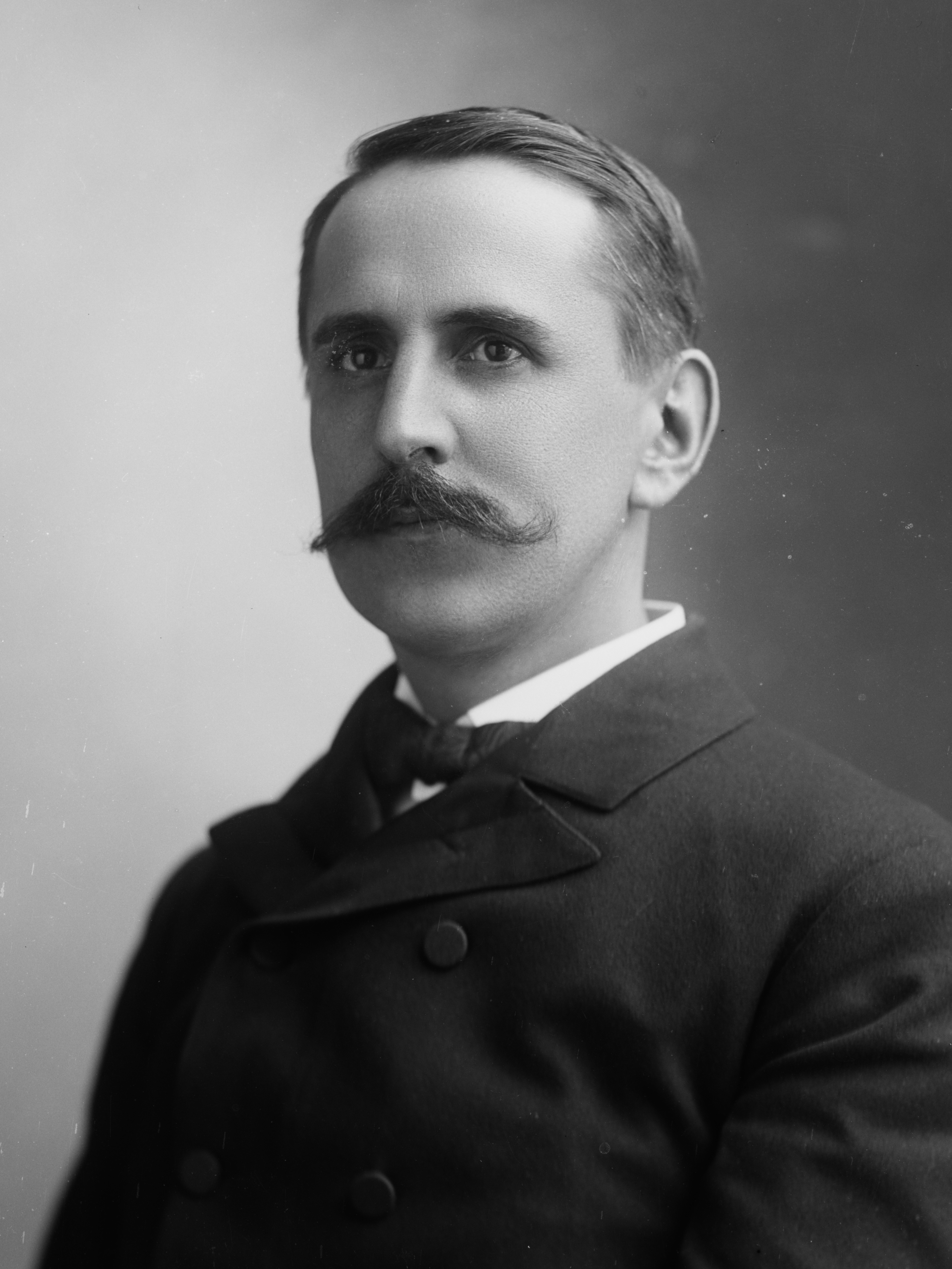
- Tawney c. 1894–1901

Member of the U.S. House of Representatives from Minnesota's 1st district
- In office March 4, 1893 – March 3, 1911
- Preceded by: William H. Harries
- Succeeded by: Sydney Anderson

House Majority Whip
- In office March 4, 1899 – March 3, 1905
- Preceded by: Position established
- Succeeded by: James E. Watson

Member of the Minnesota Senate
- In office 1890

Personal details
- Born: James Albertus Tawney; January 3, 1855 Mount Pleasant Township, Pennsylvania, U.S.
- Died: June 12, 1919 (aged 64) Excelsior Springs, Missouri
- Party: Republican
- Spouse: Emma B. Newall
- Children: 5
- Education: University of Wisconsin–Madison

James Albertus Tawney (January 3, 1855 – June 12, 1919) was an American blacksmith, machinist and U.S. politician and a member of the United States House of Representatives from Minnesota. He was the first House Majority Whip, holding that position from 1899 to 1905.

== Early life ==
Tawney was born in Mount Pleasant Township, near Gettysburg, Adams County, Pennsylvania. He apprenticed with his father as a blacksmith, and subsequently learned the trade of machinist. In 1877, he moved to Winona, Minnesota, where he was employed as a blacksmith and machinist until 1881. He attended the law department of the University of Wisconsin–Madison "having previously devoted mornings and evenings to the study of law for about two years," and was admitted to the bar in 1882 and commenced practice in Winona.

== Political career ==
Tawney was elected to the Minnesota Senate in 1890. In 1892, he was elected to Congress as a Republican, and served in the 53rd, 54th, 55th, 56th, 57th, 58th, 59th, 60th, and 61st congresses. During his time in Congress, Tawney served as Majority Whip and as chairman of the House Committee on Appropriations.

In 1910 he was defeated in the Republican primary by 30-year-old Sydney Anderson, who had the support of Theodore Roosevelt, Gifford Pinchot and other Progressive Republicans. Anderson ran on a platform of drastically reduced tariffs and opposition to Cannonism (with which Tawney was identified).

== After Congress ==
Tawney was a member of the International Joint Commission (created to prevent disputes regarding the use of Boundary Waters between the United States and Canada) from 1911 until his death, serving as chairman of the United States section from September 17, 1911, to December 1, 1914.

Tawney died at Excelsior Springs, Clay County, Missouri.

U.S. House of Representatives
Preceded by William H. Harries	Member of the U.S. House of Representatives from Minnesota's 1st congressional district 1893–1911	Succeeded by Sydney Anderson
Party political offices
Preceded by No predecessor	House Majority Whip c. 1899–1905	Succeeded by James Eli Watson (R-IN)
