= Alan Page =

American football player and judge (born 1945)

- Page in 2020

Associate Justice of the Minnesota Supreme Court
- In office January 4, 1993 – August 31, 2015
- Preceded by: Lawrence R. Yetka
- Succeeded by: Natalie Hudson

Personal details
- Born: Alan Cedric Page; August 7, 1945 (age 81) Canton, Ohio, U.S.
- Spouse: Diane Sims Page (m. 1973; died 2018)
- Children: 4
- Education: University of Notre Dame (BA); University of Minnesota (JD)
- Profession: Attorney; Judge
- Awards: Presidential Medal of Freedom (2018)
- Football career
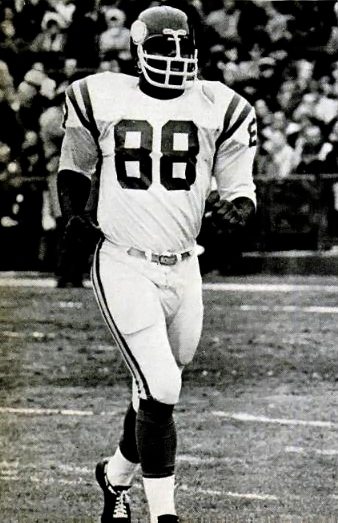
- Page in 1969

No. 88, 82
- Position: Defensive tackle

Personal information
- Listed height: 6 ft 4 in (1.93 m)
- Listed weight: 245 lb (111 kg)

Career information
- High school: Central Catholic (Canton, Ohio)
- College: Notre Dame (1964–1966)
- NFL draft: 1967: 1st round, 15th overall pick

Career history
- Minnesota Vikings (1967–1978); Chicago Bears (1978–1981)

Awards and highlights
- NFL champion (1969); NFL Most Valuable Player (1971); NFL Defensive Player of the Year (1971); 5× First-team All-Pro (1970, 1971, 1973–1975); 3× Second-team All-Pro (1969, 1972, 1976); 9× Pro Bowl (1968–1976); NFL 100th Anniversary All-Time Team; NFL 1970s All-Decade Team; 50 Greatest Vikings; Minnesota Vikings 25th Anniversary Team; Minnesota Vikings 40th Anniversary Team; Minnesota Vikings Ring of Honor; Minnesota Vikings No. 88 retired; 2× National champion (1964, 1966); Consensus All-American (1966); NFL record: Most safeties in a season: 2 (tied)

Career NFL statistics
- Sacks: 148.5
- Safeties: 3
- Interceptions: 2
- Interception yards: 42
- Fumble recoveries: 23
- Touchdowns: 3
- Stats at Pro Football Reference
- Pro Football Hall of Fame
- College Football Hall of Fame

Alan Cedric Page (born August 7, 1945) is an American former Minnesota Supreme Court judge and professional football player. After playing college football at the University of Notre Dame, Page gained national recognition as a defensive tackle in the National Football League (NFL) during 15 seasons with the Minnesota Vikings and Chicago Bears. Following his retirement, he then embarked on a legal career. Page earned a B.A. in political science from the University of Notre Dame in 1967 and a J.D. from the University of Minnesota Law School in 1978. Page served as an associate justice of the Minnesota Supreme Court from 1993 until he reached the court's mandatory retirement age of 70 in 2015.

Page was the first defensive player in NFL history to win the MVP Award and only Lawrence Taylor has done it since. He is a member of both the College Football Hall of Fame (1993) and the Pro Football Hall of Fame (1988) and is considered one of the greatest defensive linemen ever to play the game. In 2018, President Donald Trump awarded Page the Presidential Medal of Freedom.

== Early life ==
Page was born and raised in Canton, Ohio. His parents stressed the importance of education and doing his best regardless of what others did. His mother died when he was 13. Page said he wanted to become a lawyer when he was a child.

Page graduated from Canton Central Catholic High School in 1963, where he starred in several sports and excelled in football. He worked on a construction team that erected the Pro Football Hall of Fame, laying the groundwork for the building in which he would one day be enshrined.

== College football ==
After high school, Page played college football at the University of Notre Dame. As a senior, he led the Fighting Irish to a national championship in 1966, and was a consensus All-American.

Page was presented with one of the 1992 Silver Anniversary Awards (NCAA) for achieving personal distinction since his graduation. In 1993, he was inducted into the College Football Hall of Fame. In 2005, he was awarded the National Football Foundation Distinguished American Award.

In 1967, Page participated in the East-West Shrine Game and 25 years later received the "Babe Hollingbery" Award for his performance as he was inducted to that game's Hall of Fame. Page was named to the Academic All-American Hall of Fame in 2001 and as such received the Dick Enberg Award. Page also won the Walter Camp Alumni of the Year award in 1988.

== Professional football ==
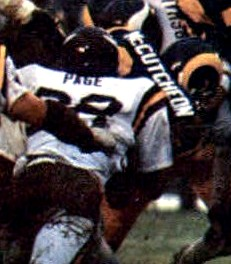
Page tackling running back Lawrence McCutcheon in 1977

Page was a first round selection (15th overall) in the 1967 NFL/AFL draft by the Minnesota Vikings, for whom he played for 11 seasons, through 1977. He is one of 11 Vikings to have played in all four Super Bowls (IV, VIII, IX, XI) in which the team appeared. Page joined the Chicago Bears in 1978 and played there for four seasons and amassed an additional 40 sacks.

As a right defensive tackle, Page had an unusual 3-point stance, placing his left rather than his right hand on the ground. During his 15-year career, the Vikings won four conference titles and one league championship. Page was a member of the Vikings' "Purple People Eaters," a defensive line adept at sacking or hurrying the quarterback. Page played in 218 consecutive games without an absence (215 consecutive in the starting line-up), during which he recovered 22 fumbles, made 148½ sacks (Vikings-108½, Bears-40), and scored three touchdowns (two on fumble recoveries and one on an interception return). He also recorded three safeties, the second most in NFL history, and blocked 23 kicks. He set a career-high with 18 sacks in 1976 and is unofficially credited with five other seasons of 10 sacks or more.

While in the NFL, Page earned All-Pro honors six times and made second-team all-league three additional times. He was voted to nine consecutive Pro Bowls. He was voted All-Conference 10 times, in 1968 and 1969 as All-Western Conference and in 1970 through 1977 and 1980 as an All-National Football Conference.

In 1971, Page was named both the AP NFL Defensive Player of the Year (the first player to be named such) and the AP's NFL Most Valuable Player. Page was the first defensive player to be named MVP since the award's inception. Only one other defensive player, Lawrence Taylor, has ever received the award. Page was also voted the NEA NFL Defensive Player of the Year in 1973. In 2019, Page was chosen as a member of the NFL's 100th Anniversary All-Time Team.

=== NFL player representative ===
Page was a National Football League Players Association player representative from 1970 to 1974 and in 1976–1977, and a member of the NFLPA Association Executive Committee from 1972 to 1975. He was one of the fifteen plaintiffs in Mackey v. National Football League in which Judge Earl R. Larson declared that the Rozelle rule was a violation of antitrust laws on December 30, 1975. He was named to the Vikings' 40th Anniversary Team in 2000. Along the way, Page was named the Associated Press NFL Defensive Player of the Week three times: week 9, 1967; week 8, 1968; week 13, 1971. In 1988, Page was further honored by his induction into the Pro Football Hall of Fame. In 1999, he was ranked number 34 on The Sporting News' list of the 100 Greatest Football Players, the highest-ranking Viking player. He received the NFL Alumni Career Achievement Award in 1995 for attaining success in his post-NFL career.

== Post-football career ==
=== Broadcasting ===
After his playing career he dabbled in the media, first as a commentator on Turner Broadcasting System covering the College Football Game of the Week series during the Fall of 1982 and then as a commentator on National Public Radio in 1982–1983.

=== Legal career ===
Long before Page's football career came to a close, he was laying the groundwork for his future role as a justice of the Minnesota Supreme Court. While still playing for the Vikings, Page attended the University of Minnesota Law School, from which he received a Juris Doctor in 1978. After graduating, he worked at the Minneapolis law firm Lindquist and Vennum from 1979 to 1984 outside the football season. Page was appointed Special Assistant Attorney General in 1985, and, soon thereafter, he was promoted to Assistant Attorney General.

In 1992, Page was elected to an open seat as an associate justice of the Minnesota Supreme Court, becoming the first African American to serve on that court. He was reelected in 1998 (becoming the biggest vote-getter in Minnesota history), again in 2004, and for a final time in 2010: Minnesota has mandatory retirement for judges at the end of the month in which they turn 70.

On January 7, 2009, Page was appointed by Chief Justice Eric Magnuson to select the three-judge panel that heard the election contest brought by Norm Coleman in the 2008 U.S. Senate election.

== Personal life, community work and other activities ==
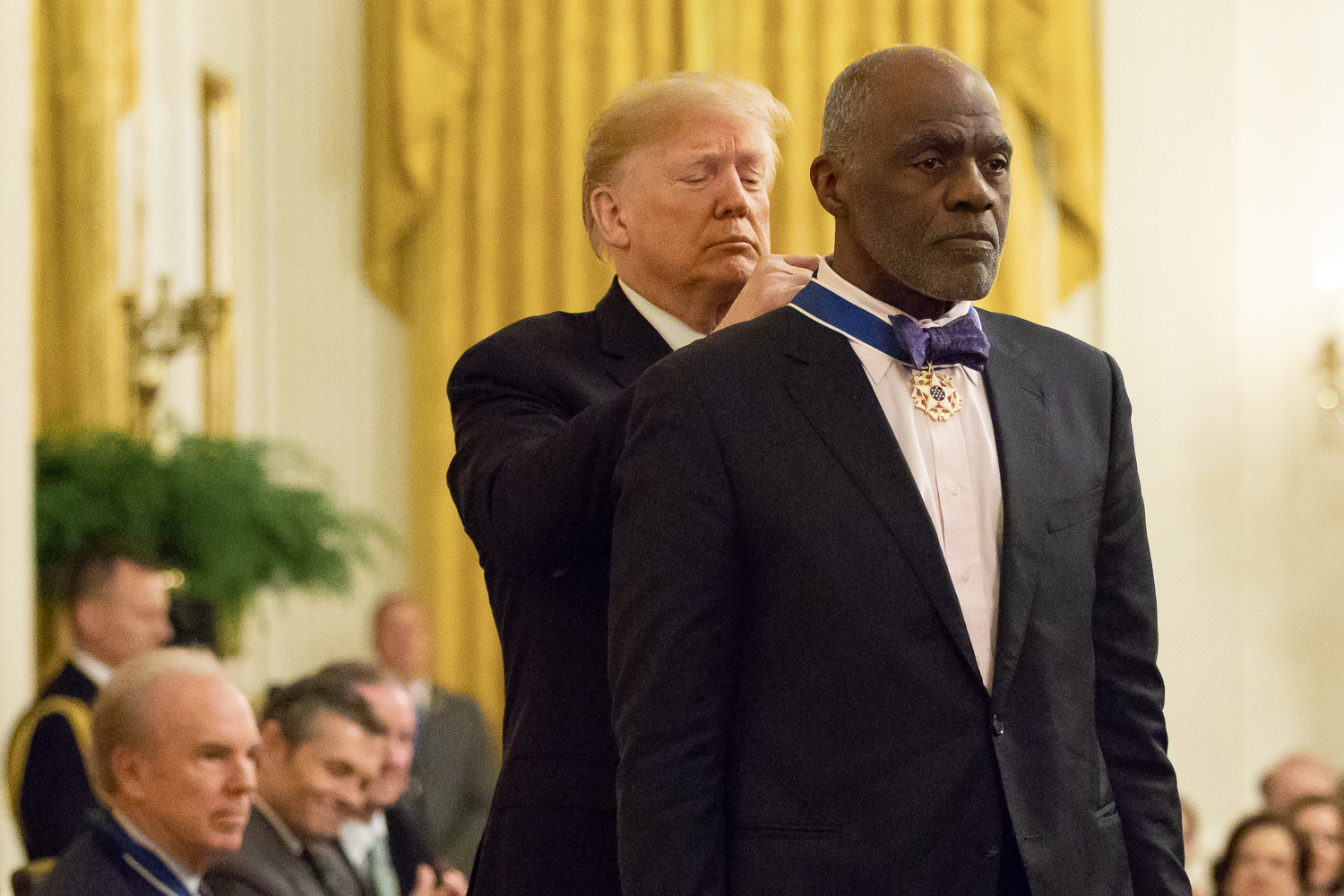
President Donald J. Trump presents the Medal of Freedom to Alan Page Friday, November 16, 2018, in the East Room of the White House.

Alan and Diane Sims Page were married from 1973 until her death in 2018. They met while she was working for General Mills and he was playing for the Minnesota Vikings. Page is a Catholic.

In 1988, the Pages founded the Page Education Foundation. It provides financial and mentoring assistance to students of color in exchange for those students' commitment to further volunteer service in the community, an idea suggested by their daughter Georgi. The Page Education Foundation has awarded grants to more than 7,500 students, who in turn have given more than 475,000 hours of their time to young children. Upon his retirement from the bench, Page plans to continue the foundation's work and find other ways to encourage students of color to be successful in school, especially by developing critical thinking skills.

Page and his daughter Kamie Page have written four children's books: Alan and His Perfectly Pointy Impossibly Perpendicular Pinky (2013), The Invisible You (2014), Grandpa Alan's Sugar Shack (2017), and Bee Love (Can Be Hard) (2020). Proceeds from the sales of these books support the Page Education Foundation. Page is the subject of the authorized biography All Rise: The Remarkable Journey of Alan Page (2010).

Page has a passion for running and runs on a regular basis. In 1979, he became the first active NFL player to complete a marathon. His running routine, which he took up while helping his wife quit smoking, is believed to have contributed to his dismissal from the Minnesota Vikings. His running schedule of 35–40 miles per week during the season, and 55 miles per week in the offseason, caused his weight to drop below that dictated by the Vikings.

The Pages, instigated by Diane Page, also created the Diane and Alan Page Collection, an extensive collection of Americana and Jim Crow-related memorabilia. In 2012, Page appeared in a Minnesota-filmed episode of PBS' Antiques Roadshow with an 1865 banner commemorating Abraham Lincoln. In 2018, the banner and select items from the Diane and Alan Page Collection were exhibited at the Minneapolis Central Library in an exhibit called 'Testify', which coincided with Super Bowl LII in Minneapolis. The Testify exhibit, directed and produced by Georgi Page, returned to the library in 2023 with additional Testify photographic displays appearing throughout the state at various regional libraries.

In June 2017, after a campaign initiated by students at Alexander Ramsey Middle School in Minneapolis, the school's name was changed to Justice Page Middle School.

In 2018, Page contributed $1,000 to Democrat Dean Phillips, who beat Republican U.S. Representative Erik Paulsen to win Minnesota's Third Congressional District seat.

In November 2018, President Donald Trump awarded Page the Presidential Medal of Freedom.

In January 2020, Page and Neel Kashkari proposed amending a portion of the Minnesota State Constitution to read, "All children have a fundamental right to a quality education that fully prepares them with the skills necessary for participation in the economy, our democracy, and society, as measured against uniform achievement standards set forth by the state. It is a paramount duty of the state to ensure quality public schools that fulfill this fundamental right."

On October 30, 2020, the North St. Paul/Maplewood/Oakdale School District (ISD 622) announced a new elementary school to be built at 2410 Holloway Avenue in Maplewood will be named Justice Alan Page Elementary School. It opened in September 2022.

== Professional accolades and memberships ==
=== Honorary degrees ===
Honorary Doctorates in Humane Letters: Macalester College, 1999; Winston-Salem State University, 2000; Gustavus Adolphus College, 2003; University of Notre Dame, 2004; Duke University, 2011; Hamline University, 2019.

Honorary Doctorates of Law: University of Notre Dame, 1993; St. John's University, 1994; Westfield State College, 1994; Luther College, 1995; University of New Haven, 1999; Carleton College, 2016.

=== Professional organizations ===
- Member, American Law Institute, 1993–present
- Member, Minnesota State Bar Association, 1979–1985, 1990–present
- Member, Minnesota Association of Black Lawyers, 1980–present
- Member, National Bar Association, 1979–present
- Member, American Bar Association, 1979–present
- Member, Advisory Board, Mixed Blood Theater, 1984–present
- Founder, Page Education Foundation, 1988. Assists minority youth with post-secondary education.
- Member, Board of Regents, University of Minnesota, 1989–1993
- Helped establish Kodak/Alan Page Challenge, a nationwide essay contest encouraging urban youth to recognize the value of education.
- Member, Institute of Bill of Rights Law Task Force on Drug Testing in the Workplace, 1990–1991
- Board of Directors, Minneapolis Urban League, 1987–1990

== See also ==
- List of consecutive starts by National Football League players
- Purple People Eaters
- List of African-American jurists
- List of American professional sports figures who held elective office
- List of first minority male lawyers and judges in Minnesota

Legal offices
Preceded by Lawrence R. Yetka	Associate Justice of the Minnesota Supreme Court; 1993–2015	Succeeded by Natalie Hudson
