= James Gilfillan (judge) =

American judge

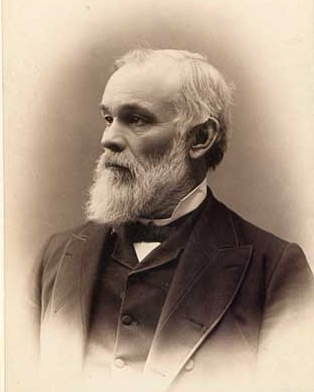
- James Gilfillan, c. 1890

Chief Justice of the Minnesota Supreme Court
- In office 1869–1870
- In office 1875–1894

Personal details
- Born: James B. Gilfillan; November 9, 1829 Bannockburn, Scotland
- Died: December 16, 1894 (aged 65) Saint Paul, Minnesota
- Resting place: Oakland Cemetery; Saint Paul, Minnesota

Military service
- Rank: Colonel
- Unit: 7th Minnesota Infantry Regiment; 11th Minnesota Infantry Regiment
- Battles/wars: American Civil War; Dakota War of 1862; Sibley's 1863 Campaign

James B. Gilfillan (March 9, 1829 – December 16, 1894) was an American lawyer and judge from Minnesota. He served as Chief Justice of the Minnesota Supreme Court from 1869 to 1870 and again from 1875 to 1894.

== Life and career ==
Gilfillian was born on March 9, 1829, in Bannockburn, Scotland. His parents emigrated to the United States when he was young and settled in Oneida County, New York. He studied law in Chenango County, New York, and Ballston Spa, New York, and was admitted to the bar in 1850. After continuing to study law in Buffalo, New York, for a few years, he decided to relocate to St. Paul, Minnesota, in 1857. He opened a law firm with his brother, Charles Duncan Gilfillan, though the American Civil War brought their partnership to an end. Gilfillian served with the 7th Minnesota Volunteer Infantry Regiment and was later named the colonel of the 11th Minnesota Volunteer Infantry Regiment. After the war ended, he returned to St. Paul to pursue a career in law. When Chief Justice Thomas Wilson resigned from the Minnesota Supreme Court in 1869, Gilfillian was named his interim replacement him by Governor William Rainey Marshall. When Chief Justice Samuel J. R. McMillan resigned in 1875, Gilfillian was again named as an interim replacement by Governor Cushman Kellogg Davis. This time he stood for re-election and won. He served on the Minnesota Supreme Court until his death in 1894.
