= Douglas K. Amdahl =

American judge (1919–2010)

Chief Justice of the Minnesota Supreme Court
- In office 1981–1989
- Nominated by: Al Quie
- Preceded by: Robert Sheran
- Succeeded by: Peter S. Popovich

Personal details
- Born: January 23, 1919 Mabel, Minnesota, U.S.
- Died: August 24, 2010 (aged 91) Richfield, Minnesota, U.S.
- Education: University of Minnesota (BBA); William Mitchell College of Law (JD)

Douglas Kenneth Amdahl (January 23, 1919 – August 24, 2010) was an American lawyer and judge from Minnesota. He served as Chief Justice of the Minnesota Supreme Court from December 1981 to January 1989.

== Early life and education ==
Amdahl was raised in the small town of Mabel in southeastern Minnesota. He was the son of Olean and Beaulah Amdahl. His father, who was a Norwegian immigrant, operated a shoe repair shop. Amdahl served in World War II in the United States Army Air Force Signals Intelligence Service, renamed as the National Security Agency (NSA), as a cryptologist within the European theater. After flying in and going ashore three days after the D-Day invasion of Normandy Beach, Douglas K. Amdahl coordinated efforts to decrypt German enigma communication and was briefly a tank commander at the Battle of the Bulge despite previously being prohibited from combat due to his poor eyesight.

== Career ==
He served as a judge in Hennepin County from 1961 to 1980.

While chief justice, Amdahl was a leader in establishing the Minnesota Court of Appeals, which was created in 1983. Prior to that, if a person believed a district judge erred in a ruling, the only avenue for appeal was the state supreme court, which could take up to three years to issue a ruling. The creation of the appeals court enabled a quicker resolution to cases and provided additional oversight in the judicial process.

Amdahl also taught at William Mitchell College of Law (now Mitchell Hamline School of Law), where he graduated summa cum laude as class valedictorian and served on its board of trustees.

== Hennepin County Government Center ==
Amdahl sponsored the construction of the Hennepin County government center located in downtown Minneapolis. As a Hennepin County chief judge, he cut the ribbon, recommended the design of the judicial chambers, and campaigned for funding. He would later recall "In our designs, I had designated the thirteenth floor of the courthouse for the chief judge's office, the media office, and as the site for another three or four offices that would be tied in with administration and with the public. I moved over there on Friday the 13th of December, 1973, on the thirteenth floor. There wasn't any bad luck connected with that at all. I was the first judge to move into the new building."

== Minnesota Judicial Center ==
Amdahl worked to fund the construction of the Minnesota Judicial Center - spearheading designs with his friend United States Supreme Court Justice Warren Burger - who also graduated from the Saint Paul College of law (later known as William Mitchell College of Law). The building incorporates the Minnesota Court of Appeals, Minnesota Supreme Court, law library, and court administration into one building. The Minnesota Judicial Center was completed in 1992. Amdahl sent a letter to then United States Supreme Court Chief Justice William Rehnquist "asking him to be here in April of this year for the dedication of the building. He agreed to come. [Amdahl] later ran into him in Williamsburg Pennsylvania one day. "Amdahl," he said, "you have given me more trouble than anybody else. Never have I promised to do anything so far in advance, and I'm always running into problems with that date." "Well, [Amdahl] said, "I probably should have told you a month ago, but I didn't know how to do it. We're not going to be ready then, so we're going to have to move the date."

== Personal life and death ==
Amdahl was ranked #1 in the 100 most influential lawyers in the history of Minnesota and #1 in Minnesota's Legal Hall of Fame. During his tenure as Chief Justice, Amdahl maintained a cottage along the Saint Croix River near Hudson in Saint Croix County, Wisconsin. Amdahl survived two plane crashes, first in war, second on a fishing expedition in Canada during his tenure as chief justice. Amdahl died on August 24, 2010, at the age of 91 and was buried at Fort Snelling National Cemetery.
