= Charles Eugene Flandrau =

American judge

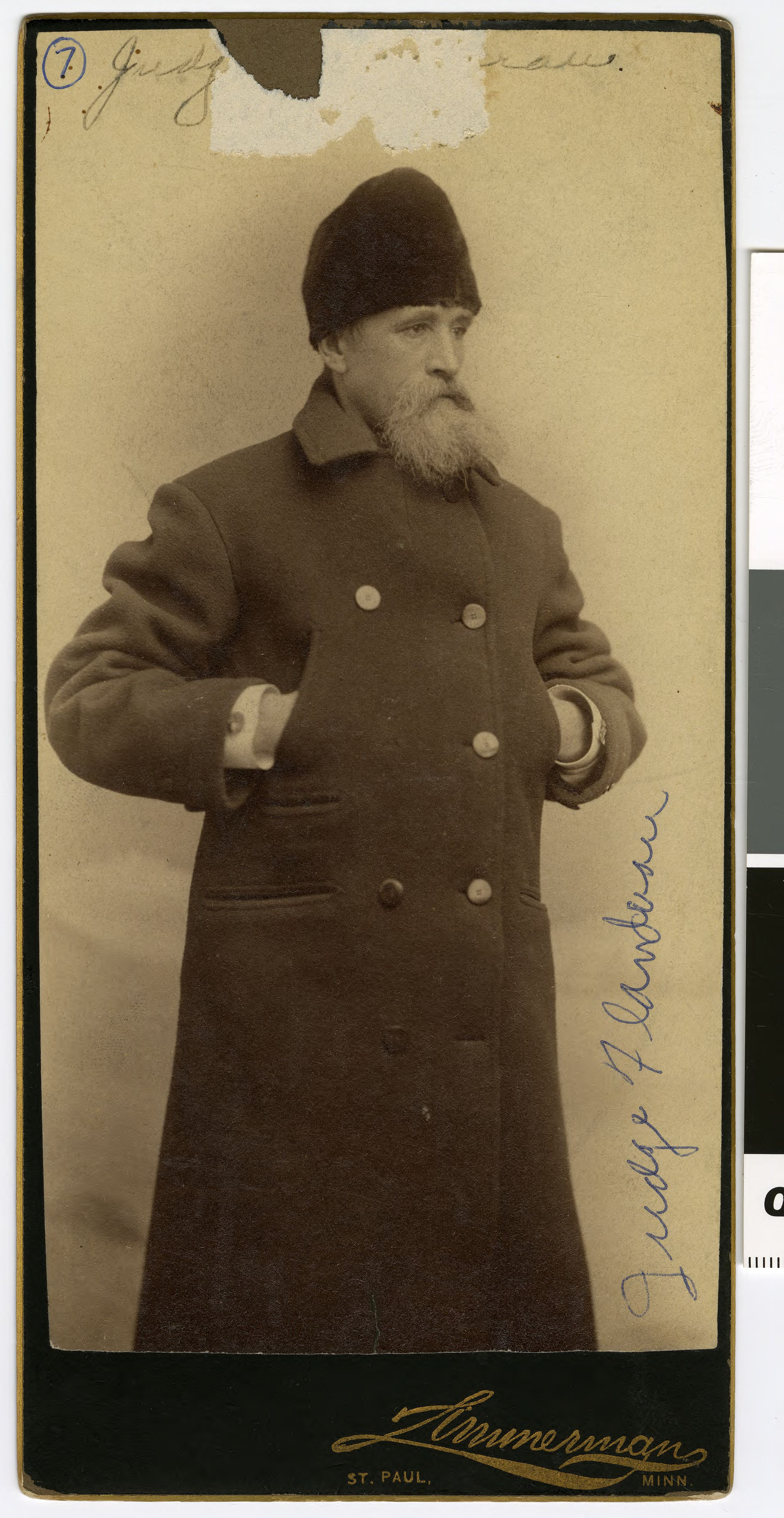
- Flandrau c. 1866
- Born: July 15, 1828; New York City, New York, U.S.
- Died: September 9, 1903 (aged 75); Saint Paul, Minnesota, U.S.
- Burial place: Oakland Cemetery; Saint Paul, Minnesota
- Spouse: Isabella Ramsay Dinsmore
- Children: Martha Macomb "Patty" Selmes; Sarah Gibson Cutcheon; Charles Macomb Flandrau; William Blair McClure Flandrau
- Military career
- Allegiance: Union Army
- Branch: Militia
- Service years: 1862-1863
- Rank: Captain; Brevet Colonel
- Conflicts: Dakota War of 1862: Battles of New Ulm

Signature
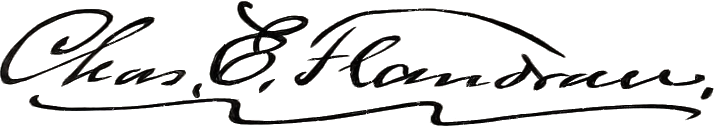

Charles Eugene Flandrau (July 15, 1828 – September 9, 1903) was an American lawyer who became influential in the Minnesota Territory, and later state, after moving there in 1853 from New York City. He served on the Minnesota Territorial Council, in the Minnesota Constitutional Convention, and on the Minnesota territorial and state supreme courts. He was also an associate justice on the Minnesota Supreme Court.

During the Dakota War, Flandrau enlisted in the Union Army and was commissioned as a captain in 1862 to raise a force to defend settlers at New Ulm. Given his success, the governor appointed him to lead the defense of southwest Minnesota, at the rank of colonel. After unsuccessfully campaigning for a couple of positions, Flandrau moved in 1870 to St. Paul, where he had a law partnership with two men until his death in 1903.

== Early life ==
Flandrau was born in 1828 in New York City. His father was Thomas Hunt Flandrau of New Rochelle, New York, an attorney and law partner of Aaron Burr. His mother was Elizabeth Maria Macomb, a daughter of Alexander Macomb, the wealthy New York merchant, and his wife; and half-sister of Alexander Macomb (1782–1841). Her brother became a career officer, general and hero of the War of 1812; afterward he was appointed as head of the United States Army. The Flandraus were descendants of Jacques Flandreau, a French Huguenot who came to New Rochelle in the 1690s. The spelling of their name was influenced by successive Dutch and English settlement in the region.

Flandrau was educated in Georgetown, then a separate community in the District of Columbia, until the age of 13, when he tried to enlist in the Navy. Too young to obtain an appointment, he spent three years as a common sailor under other services. In 1844, tiring of the sea, he worked for three years in the mahogany trade in New York City. He rejoined his family, then living in Whitesboro, New York, and apprenticed to "read the law" in his father's law practice. Flandrau passed the bar in 1851 and joined his father's firm as partner.

== Career ==
In 1853, Flandrau relocated to Traverse des Sioux, Minnesota, to practice law. During the 1850s, he served on the Minnesota Territorial Council, in the Minnesota Constitutional Convention, and on the Minnesota territorial and state supreme courts. He was also appointed as U.S. Agent for the Sioux in 1856; in this region they were Dakota people.

When the American Civil War began, Flandrau was a vocal opponent. He refused to join the Union Army for any purpose of aggression against the Confederates, damaging his credibility further.

In August 1862, learning of a violent Dakota uprising in the southwestern corner of the state Flandrau enlisted in the Union Army as a captain. He assembled an armed force and quickly went to the defense of settlers at New Ulm. Both Flandrau State Park and the community of Flandreau, South Dakota, are named in his honor, as he was successful in defending the community. Governor Alexander Ramsey appointed Flandrau in charge of the defense of the southwestern frontier of the state, and he served in this capacity at the rank of colonel for two years, simultaneous to his position on the Minnesota Supreme Court.

In 1864, Flandrau resigned from both positions and moved to Nevada to practice law. He returned to Minneapolis within a year to practice law with Isaac Atwater.

In 1867, he ran as the Democratic candidate for Governor of Minnesota but was defeated by William Rainey Marshall. In mid-September of 1867, while campaigning for Governor, Flandrau gave a speech using racial slurs, garnering him national attention for his explicit opposition to protections for African-Americans and support for racial violence. Secretary of State William H. Seward urged Minnesotans not to vote for Flandrau. In 1869 he ran for chief justice of the Minnesota Supreme Court, but was again defeated.

In 1870, he moved to St. Paul, Minnesota, where he began a legal partnership with Horace R. Bigelow and Greenleaf Clark. He worked with them until his death in 1903.

== Personal life ==
Judge Flandrau was married twice. His first marriage was on August 10, 1859, to his first cousin, Isabella Dinsmore of Kentucky, the daughter of Martha Macomb and James Dinsmore. The couple had two daughters, Martha Macomb and Sarah Gibson Flandrau, before Isabella died in 1867. Martha married Tilden Russell Selmes; their daughter, Isabella Selmes, became the first woman elected to Arizona congress, known by her married name of Isabella Greenway.

Flandrau married again to Rebecca B. Riddle, a widow and daughter of Judge William McClure and his wife of Pittsburgh, Pennsylvania. They had two sons. Charles Macomb Flandrau became a noted author, writing stories and a novel about college life, as well as short stories published in leading magazines of the day, such as The Saturday Evening Post.

Their second son William Blair McClure Flandrau in the early 1900s had a coffee plantation in Mexico. William married Grace Hodgson. She was nineteen when she first met his brother and author Charles, then 38, who served as a mentor when she first started writing. She became a popular author who was financially successful. Grace Flandrau left money in her will to a variety of institutions, including the University of Arizona, which named Flandrau Science Center for her.

== Publications ==
- The History of Minnesota and Tales of the Frontier (1900) Librivox audio

Party political offices
Preceded by Henry Mower Rice	Democratic nominee for Governor of Minnesota; 1867	Succeeded by George L. Otis
