= Peter Popovich =

American judge and politician (1920–1996)

Chief Justice of the Minnesota Supreme Court
- In office November 16, 1987 – November 30, 1990
- Appointed by: Rudy Perpich
- Preceded by: Douglas Amdahl
- Succeeded by: A.M. "Sandy" Keith

Chief Judge of the Minnesota Court of Appeals
- In office November 2, 1983 – November 15, 1987
- Appointed by: Rudy Perpich
- Preceded by: Office Created
- Succeeded by: D.D. Wozniak

Personal details
- Born: Peter Stephen Popovich; November 27, 1920 Crosby, Minnesota, U.S.
- Died: March 29, 1996 (aged 75) St. Marys Point, Minnesota, U.S.
- Resting place: Chisholm Cemetery; Chisholm, Minnesota, U.S.
- Spouse(s): Dorothy Ann Lee (m. 1944, divorced) Gail (m. 1985)
- Children: 4

Peter Stephen Popovich (November 27, 1920 – March 29, 1996) was an American lawyer, politician and judge from Minnesota. He is the only person in the state's history to serve as both Chief Judge of the Minnesota Court of Appeals and Chief Justice of the Minnesota Supreme Court.

== Early life and education ==
Peter Stephen Popovich was born on November 27, 1920, in Crosby, Minnesota, to Peter Popovich. His parents were Yugoslavian immigrants. His father was a merchant and served as treasurer of Chisholm. His mother died when he was 13 years old. He graduated from Chisholm High School in Chisholm. He attended Hibbing Junior College. In the 1940s, he was a part-time dance instructor in St. Paul. He graduated from the University of Minnesota in 1942 and from St. Paul College of Law (then the St. Paul College of Law) in 1947.

== Career ==
Popovich was in private practice in the Twin Cities from 1947 to 1983. He served in the Minnesota House of Representatives from 1953 to 1963. He supported Minnesota's Open Meeting Law.

Upon the creation of the Minnesota Court of Appeals in 1983, Governor Rudy Perpich appointed Popovich to be chief judge. Perpich elevated him to the Minnesota Supreme Court in November 1987, and named him chief justice on February 1, 1989, succeeding Douglas K. Amdahl. He resigned as chief justice due to the age limit in November 1990. He assisted in the creation of the Minnesota Judicial Center and created the Court Information Center.

Popovich was on the board of Minnesota State. Following his retirement from the Supreme Court, Popovich joined the Minneapolis law firm of Briggs & Morgan and practiced there until his death.

== Personal life ==
Following graduation from law school, Popovich contracted polio and was hospitalized for three months. He married Dorothy Ann Lee, daughter of Lloyd V. Lee, of St. Paul on May 11, 1944. They had four children, Vicki, Dorothy, Suzanne and Stephen. They divorced after 18 years. He married Gail in 1985.

Popovich died on March 29, 1996, at Midway Hospital in St. Paul. He was buried in Chisholm Cemetery.

== Awards ==
In 1998, Popovich was awarded a national award by the Foundation for the Improvement of Justice. In 1991, he was awarded the John R. Finnegan Freedom of Information Award.

Legal offices
Preceded by Douglas K. Amdahl	Chief Justice of the Minnesota Supreme Court; 1987 – 1992	Succeeded by A.M. "Sandy" Keith
Preceded by Office Created	Chief Judge of the Minnesota Court of Appeals; 1983 – 1987	Succeeded by D.D. Wozniak
