= Thomas Wilson (Minnesota politician) =

American judge

The Honourable Thomas Wilson
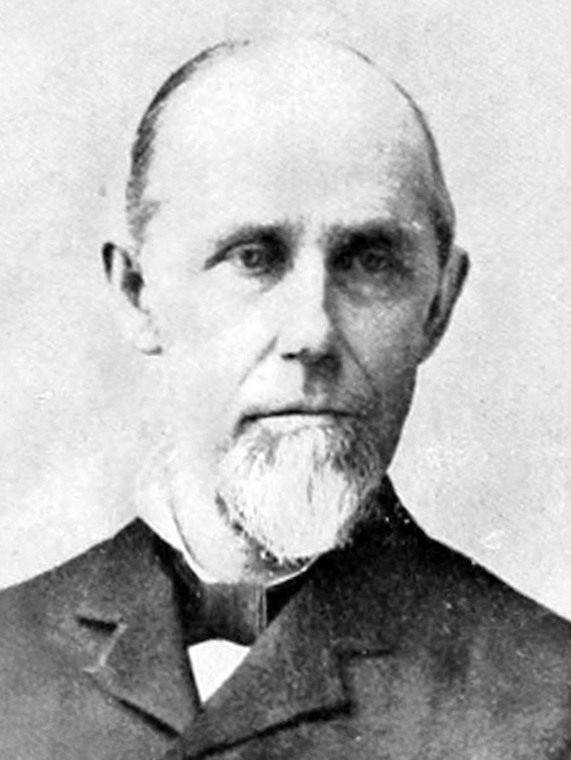

Member of the U.S. House of Representatives from Minnesota's 1st district
- In office March 4, 1887 – March 3, 1889
- Preceded by: Milo White
- Succeeded by: Mark H. Dunnell

Chief Justice of the Minnesota Supreme Court
- In office 1865–1869
- Nominated by: Stephen Miller
- Preceded by: LaFayette Emmett
- Succeeded by: James Gilfillan

Associate Justice of the Minnesota Supreme Court
- In office 1864–1865
- Nominated by: Stephen Miller

Member of the Minnesota House of Representatives
- In office 1882–1885

Member of the Minnesota Senate
- In office 1880–1882

Personal details
- Born: May 16, 1827 Dungannon, County Tyrone, Ireland, U.K.
- Died: April 3, 1910 (aged 82) Saint Paul, Minnesota, U.S.
- Party: Democratic

Thomas Wilson (May 16, 1827 – April 3, 1910) was an Irish-born American lawyer, Minnesota congressman and state legislator, associate justice and the second chief justice of the Minnesota Supreme Court.

Wilson was born in Dungannon, County Tyrone, Ireland, U.K., and attended the common schools. He immigrated to the United States in 1839 with his parents, who settled in Venango County, Pennsylvania.

== Legal & Judicial Career ==
He graduated from Allegheny College, Meadville, Pennsylvania, in 1852, where he studied law. He was admitted to the bar in February 1855 and commenced practice in Winona, Minnesota, becoming a member of the Minnesota Constitutional convention in 1857. He was then judge of the third judicial district court from 1857 – 1864, associate justice of the Minnesota Supreme Court in 1864, and chief justice from 1865 to July 1869, when he resigned, to resume his career as a lawyer.

== Political Career ==
He was elected as a member of the Minnesota House of Representatives, serving from 1880 – 1882. He then served in the Minnesota Senate 1882–1885, elected as a Democrat to the Fiftieth Congress (March 4, 1887 – March 3, 1889). He worked for and had ties to the Chicago, St. Paul, Minneapolis & Omaha Railroad and refused to cut ties with his business interests while in office, earning him a reputation as a monopolist.

In 1890, he was the Democratic nominee for governor, however lost the three-way race due to running a conservative campaign at a time when the state was dominated by progressive movements and politics.

Following his defeat, he was a delegate to the Democratic National Convention in 1892.

He died in St. Paul, Minnesota, on April 3, 1910, and is buried in Woodlawn Cemetery, Winona, Minnesota.

Party political offices
Preceded by Eugene McLanahan Wilson	Democratic nominee for Governor of Minnesota; 1890	Succeeded by Daniel W. Lawler
U.S. House of Representatives
Preceded by Milo White	U.S. Representative from Minnesota's 1st congressional district 1887–1889	Succeeded by Mark H. Dunnell
