= Isaac Atwater =

American judge

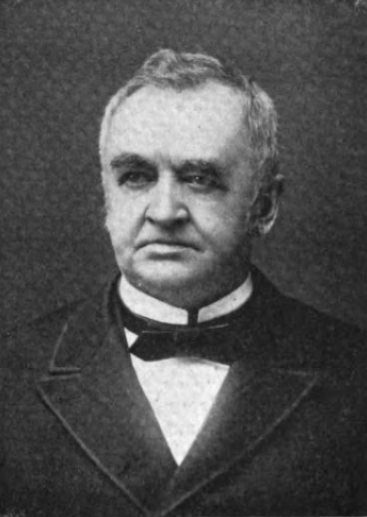
Isaac Atwater in 1899

Isaac Atwater (May 3, 1818 – December 22, 1906) was an American lawyer, judge, politician and historian.

== Biography ==
Isaac Atwater was born on May 3, 1818 in Homer, New York to Ezra Atwater, a farmer, and Esther Leaming. Both his parents hailed from Connecticut and were of English descent; their ancestors had emigrated from England in about 1748. He was the ninth of eleven children. As a youngster he worked on the family farm and received education in day schools. Ezra Atwater gave most of his farmland to his older sons and expected his younger sons, including Isaac, to become farmers; however, Isaac had intellectual interests from a young age, reportedly did not care about farming and by sixteen had studied Latin, algebra and history extensively. Atwater, whose father could not financially support his higher education, worked as a teacher in order to secure his admission to Yale University in 1840. In his senior year at Yale he was made an editor of the Yale Literary Magazine. He graduated in 1844 in the top quarter of his class. He worked as a teacher at a private school in Macon, Georgia for a year after his graduation in order to pay for an entry to Yale Law School, which he entered in 1845. Atwater graduated in 1847 and thereupon entered the practice of Robert Benner, a fellow Yale alumnus. After being admitted to the New York bar he opened his own practice in Nassau.

In August of 1849 he married Permelia A. Sanborn, who was from Geddes, New York. In 1850 they moved, on account of Atwater's poor health (he had been having symptoms of tuberculosis), to St. Anthony, Minnesota Territory; Atwater purchased a parcel of land there for $800 on credit, which he paid off in two years using the money he earned from his legal business. Atwater opened a new practice alongside John W. North, a former schoolmate of his. He split with North in 1851 and continued his practice alone. In April of that year, Elmer Tyler, a tailor from St. Anthony, asked Atwater if he would be interested in helping him run a newspaper, to which Atwater reluctantly agreed. The newspaper, the St. Anthony Express, resulted; it was the seventh newspaper started in Minnesota and the first printed in Minnesota outside of St. Paul. Atwater wrote the editorials while Tyler was initially responsible for publishing it. Tyler, finding that the scale of the newspaper was becoming too much for him to handle, quit. Atwater gave ownership of the St. Anthony Express to its printers, brothers H. and J. P. Woodbury.

In 1851 the legislature of the Minnesota Territory made him secretary of the board of regents of what would become the University of Minnesota; he advocated for its permanent establishment in 1857 by the Minnesota state constitution. Minnesota Territory governor Alexander Ramsey appointed Atwater reporter of the decisions of the Minnesota Supreme Court on March 13, 1852. He was elected district attorney for Hennepin County in the fall of 1853. He was elected associate justice of the Minnesota Supreme Court in 1858, in the first judicial election held after Minnesota became a state. He thus resigned from the board of regents. Atwater started acting as associate justice on May 24, 1958. In March of 1864 Atwater, dissatisfied with his salary of $2,000 a year, resigned from the Minnesota Supreme Court. He invited Charles Eugene Flandrau into a partnership in 1866 and started practicing law with him in Carson City, Nevada, but had no intent to move there permanently. In the fall of 1867 he and Flandrau returned to Minnesota and continued their partnership, which lasted until 1871.

Atwater served on the Minneapolis City Council and as president of the board of education and the board of trade. He was also a trustee of the Seabury seminary in Faribault, and an active member of the local Episcopalian church; the latter elected him "warden emeritus" in 1883. He also helped incorporate a business that would build the first bridge between Minneapolis and Saint Paul. Atwater also wrote about the history of Minnesota. In 1892 he edited The History of Minneapolis; his obituary in The Minneapolis Journal noted that "his native ability and scholarly attainments commanded a prominent place in the community".

Atwater died in his apartment in Minneapolis, Minnesota on December 22, 1906 after an illness of six months' duration. He and Permelia had had four children but only one, John B. Atwater, was alive at the time of his death. Atwater was the last surviving member of the original Minneapolis bar.

== Isaac and Permelia Atwater House ==
A house in Shakopee, Minnesota that Atwater once purchased became known later on as the Isaac and Permelia Atwater House, although he might not have ever lived in it. The house, which was constructed in the 1850s, is maintained, along with other historical houses in the Minnesota River Valley, by the organisation Murphy's Landing. The house and its garden were the subjects of writings by Permelia Atwater. In 1983 the house, which was once used to house recovering drug addicts, was renovated by several woodworking students of Dakota County Area Vocational Technical Institute, who refinished the wooden components and created new door jambs and windowsills to replace the worn-down ones.

== Publications ==
- History of the City of Minneapolis, Minnesota, Part I (1893)
- History of the City of Minneapolis, Minnesota, Part II (1893)

== Works cited ==
- Magazine of Western History: Vol 7 Iss 6. Vol. 7. Open Court Publishing Co. April 1888.
- Magazine of Western History 1888-07: Vol 8 Iss 3. Open Court Publishing Co. July 1888.
- Johnston, Daniel S. B. (1905). Minnesota journalism in the territorial period. Minnesota Historical Society.
- Hage, George S. (1967). Newspapers on the Minnesota Frontier 1849-1860. Minnesota Historical Society Pr. ISBN 978-0-87351-034-9.
