= Lindquist & Vennum =

Lindquist & Vennum LLP
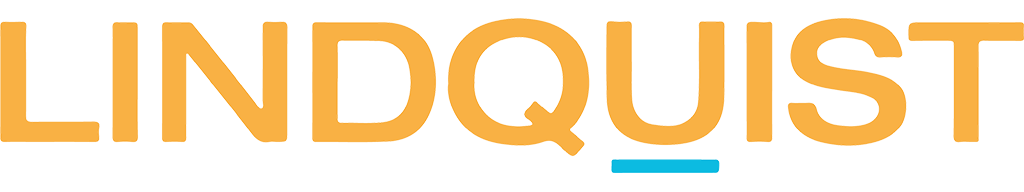
- Headquarters: IDS Center; Minneapolis, Minnesota
- No. of offices: 3
- No. of attorneys: Approximately 170
- Major practice areas: General Practice
- Key people: Dennis O'Malley, Managing Partner
- Date founded: 1968
- Founder: Leonard E. Lindquist
- Company type: Limited liability partnership
- Dissolved: 2018
- Website: www.lindquist.com

Lindquist & Vennum LLP was a law firm of approximately 170 attorneys that provided corporate finance, transactional and litigation services for clients from offices in Minnesota, Colorado, and South Dakota. The firm was formed in 1968 when Lindquist, Magnuson & Glennon combined with Vennum, Newhall, Ackman & Goetz. As of January 1, 2018, the firm merged with and took the name of Ballard Spahr.

In the autumn of 2016, the firm moved into new offices in the IDS Center in downtown Minneapolis.

== Pro bono service ==
In January 2007, the Minnesota Judicial Branch recognized Lindquist & Vennum for its pro bono work. Chief Justice Russell Anderson presented a plaque to the firm's Daryle L. Uphoff and Candee Goodman on January 18 in recognition of its contribution of pro bono legal services to the citizens of Minnesota. In 2013, the firm was named to The National Law Journal's Pro Bono Hot List.

== Merger with Ballard Spahr ==
On September 5, 2017, Lindquist & Vennum and the Philadelphia firm Ballard Spahr announced that they had agreed to combine effective January 1, 2018. Ballard Spahr, an Am Law 100 firm, had more than 500 lawyers in 13 offices in the United States before the combination. The merged firm retained the Ballard Spahr name and had more than 650 lawyers in 15 offices nationwide.

The combination gave Ballard Spahr its first offices in the Midwest, its other offices being located mainly on the coasts as well as in Colorado, Utah and Arizona. The Minneapolis office, which then had more than 100 attorneys, became Ballard Spahr's largest outside Philadelphia; the firm's Denver and Sioux Falls offices were also part of the transaction. The Sioux Falls office, opened in March 2012, had ten lawyers and seven staff members at the time of the merger.

Lindquist & Vennum had earlier held merger discussions with the Minneapolis firm Oppenheimer, Wolff & Donnelly. Those talks did not lead to a combination, in part because of conflicts involving current and former clients of the two firms. Oppenheimer merged with the Philadelphia firm Fox Rothschild in 2016.

== Petters and Polaroid bankruptcies ==
After the 2008 collapse of the business empire of Tom Petters, Lindquist & Vennum worked with Douglas A. Kelley, who was named receiver by the federal government and appointed bankruptcy trustee for Petters Company, Inc., Petters Group Worldwide and eight affiliated entities. Of the 202 "clawback" lawsuits Kelley had filed as of October 2010, 124 were handled by Lindquist & Vennum, compared with 53 by Kelley's own firm, Kelley Wolter & Scott, and 25 by Fruth Jamison & Elsass. Lindquist & Vennum also performed most of the bankruptcy work for the Petters companies and for Polaroid Corporation, a Petters holding that was sold in April 2009 for $85.9 million.

Attorneys of the firm involved in the proceedings included managing partner Daryle Uphoff, who advised Kelley, and George Singer, who reported on the status of dismissal motions in the clawback cases to United States Bankruptcy Judge Gregory Kishel in April 2011.

Fees generated by the work were substantial. As of October 25, 2010, Lindquist & Vennum had been paid $3.2 million in the receivership, and court filings indicated that the firm had billed a further $4.6 million in the Polaroid bankruptcy as of December 2010; Twin Cities Business put the firm's earnings at $7.8 million at that point. In June 2014, Kelley sought court approval to pay the firm $1.18 million in fees and $33,879 in expenses for services performed between February 1 and April 30 of that year, the largest of roughly $3.5 million in fee requests filed in that period on behalf of firms working on the Petters litigation.
