= Greenleaf Clark =

American judge

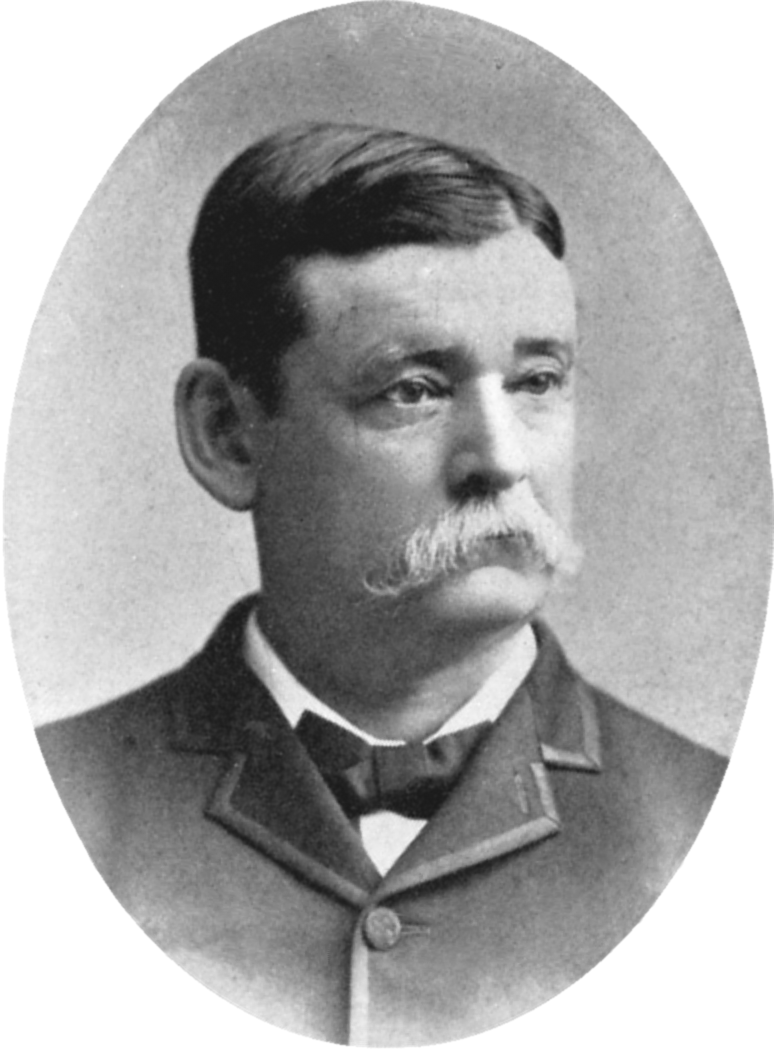

Judge for the Minnesota Supreme Court
- In office 1881–1882

Personal details
- Born: August 23, 1835 Plaistow, New Hampshire
- Died: December 7, 1904 (aged 69) Lamanda Park, Pasadena, California

Greenleaf Clark (August 23, 1835 – December 7, 1904) was an American jurist.

== Biography ==
Born in Plaistow, New Hampshire, Clark received his bachelor's degree from Dartmouth College in 1855 and his law degree from Harvard Law School in 1857. He then moved to Saint Paul, Minnesota to practice law and was an attorney for the Great Northern Railroad. Clark served briefly on the Minnesota Supreme Court in 1881 and 1882. Clark died suddenly at his winter home in Lamanda Park, Pasadena, California.
