= Roger L. Dell =

American judge

Roger L. Dell (July 19, 1897 – March 8, 1966) was an American businessman, lawyer, and jurist.

Born in Bird Island, Minnesota, Dell graduated from Shakopee High School in Shakopee, Minnesota, in 1916. He received his law degree, in 1920, from Saint Paul College of Law (now William Mitchell College of Law). He was admitted to the Minnesota Bar and moved to Fergus Falls. He practiced there with several different law partners until Governor C. Elmer Anderson appointed him to the Minnesota Supreme Court in January 1953. He served as chief justice from 1953 to 1962. After his retirement in 1962, Dell managed and was president of Fergus Properties. Dell died in a hospital in Minneapolis, Minnesota of a heart attack just before he was going undergo heart surgery.
