= Rosehill Cemetery =

American garden cemetery in Chicago

- U.S. National Register of Historic Places
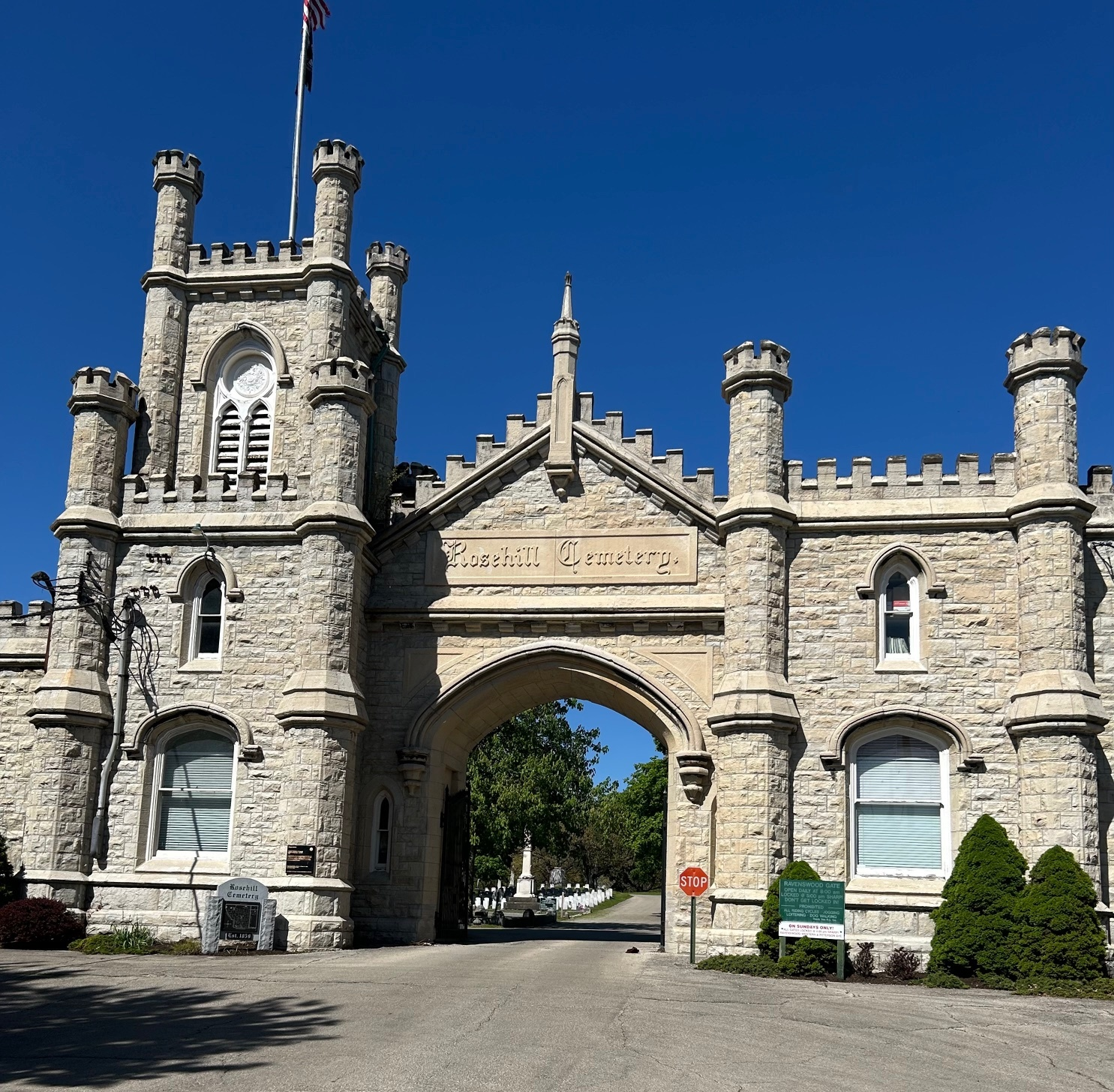
- Rosehill Main Gate

- Location within Chicago metropolitan area Location within Illinois Location within the United States
- Location: Chicago, Illinois, U.S.
- Coordinates: 41°59′13″N 87°40′45″W
- Area: ha (350 acres)
- Built: 1859
- NRHP reference No.: 75000651
- Added to NRHP: 1975

Rosehill Cemetery (founded 1859) is a historic rural cemetery on the North Side of Chicago, Illinois in the United States. At 350 acres (1.4 km^{2}), it is the largest cemetery in the city of Chicago and its first private cemetery. The Entrance Gate and Administration Building, designed by William W. Boyington in the castellated Gothic style was listed in the National Register of Historic Places in 1975. Rosehill Mausoleum, also known as the Community Mausoleum, was built in 1914. It is the largest mausoleum in Chicago and features several stained glass windows by Louis Comfort Tiffany. The Horatio N. May Chapel, completed in 1899, was designed in the English Gothic style by architect Joseph Lyman Silsbee. Rosehill is the final resting place of many notable individuals, including 16 Union Civil War generals, Chicago politicians, business leaders, artists, athletes, and a Vice President of the United States. Well-known names such as Oscar Mayer, Montgomery Ward and Richard Sears are interred at the cemetery. Notable monuments include several Civil War memorials and the Volunteer Firefighters' Monument. As of 2021, the cemetery has over 190,000 interments.

== Description ==
Rosehill Cemetery, located at 5800 N. Ravenswood Avenue in Chicago, is a 350-acre landscaped cemetery, bordered by Western Avenue, Peterson Avenue, Ravenswood Avenue and Bryn Mawr/ Damen/ Bowmanville Avenues. Situated at the city's highest elevation, it is the largest cemetery within the city limits of Chicago. It is located in the north east section of the Lincoln Square community area. As of 2021, more than 190,000 individuals have been interred at Rosehill Cemetery.

== History ==
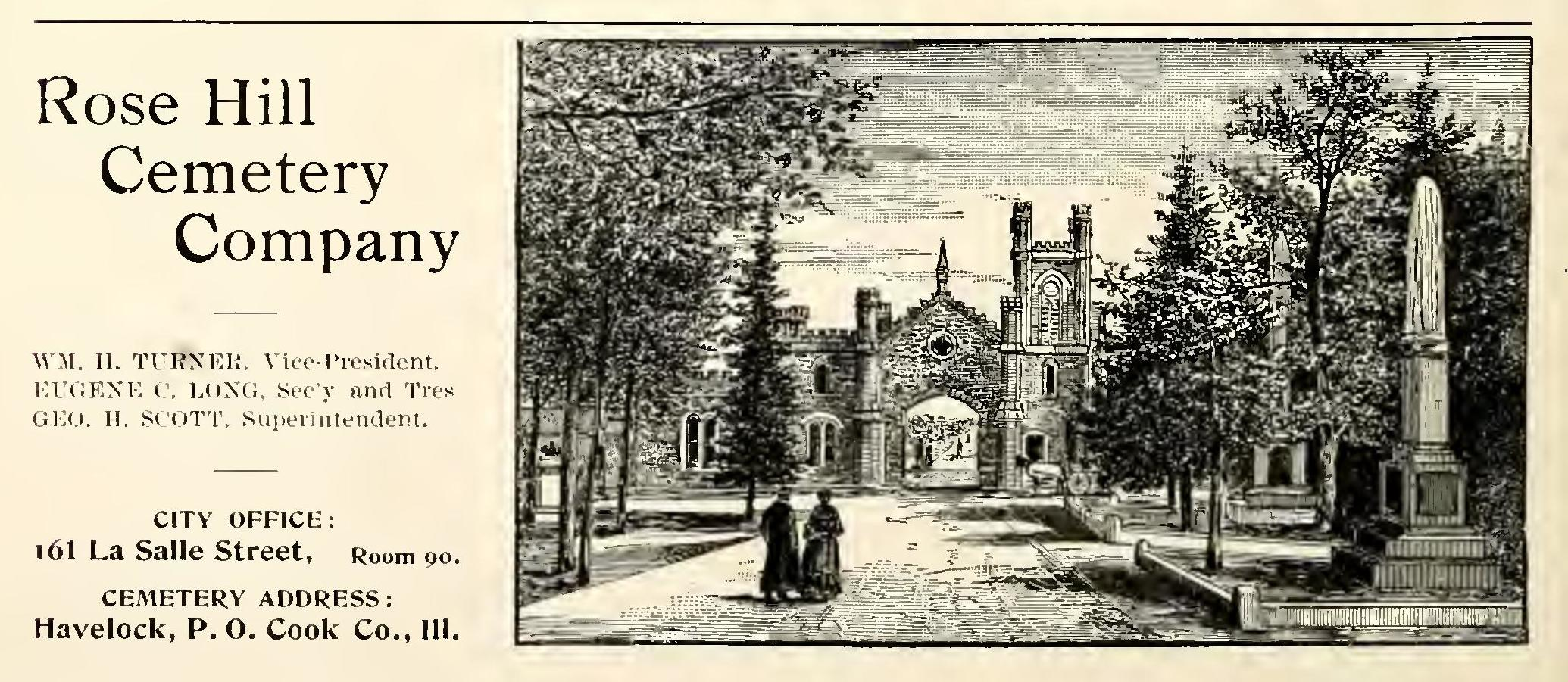
Roseville Cemetery Company, 1894 advertisement

=== Rosehill Cemetery Company ===
Chicago's first private cemetery, the Rosehill Cemetery Corporation, was founded by landowner, Francis H. Benson and Chicago physician, Dr. James Van Zandt Blaney on February 11, 1859. Other founders included railroad executive, William B. Ogden and businessman John H. Kinzie. The 350-acre property, originally owned by Benson was located seven miles north of Chicago in the town of Chittenden. Sitting at the highest elevation in Chicago it was an ideal site for a cemetery and was easily accessible from Chicago by train. Dr. Blaney was appointed the first president of Rosehill Cemetery. The first interment was Dr. J.W. Ludlam on July 11, 1859. Rosehill Cemetery was dedicated in a public ceremony on July 27, 1859.

"Dedication of Rosehill Cemetery: A procession will be formed at 8:30 am at the Tremont House, consisting of the Masonic Fraternity, Mayor, Common Council, Clergy, Judiciary, Members of the Press, Officers of the Cemetery and citizens who may wish to join it. The procession will move at 9 o'clock precisely and march thence to the depot of Chicago and Milwaukee Railroad, where a train of cars will be waiting to convey all who wish to go to the cemetery grounds free of charge. Upon arrival of the train at the cemetery the following will be the order of exercises: laying of the cornerstone of the Chapel, dirge by the Light Guard band, introductory remarks ... a hymn composed for the occasion... benediction... A sale of cemetery lots will take place on the grounds at 3 o'clock."

— Chicago Tribune, July 27, 1859.

Two different stories offer the origin of Rosehill Cemetery's name. One legend claims the area was originally called "Roe's Hill" after pioneer settler Hiram Roe, but a clerical error by the Chicago City Clerk changed it to "Rosehill". A 1913 Rosehill Cemetery Company marketing pamphlet offered a different explanation, suggesting the name came from the wild white roses that once grew on the hill of the original property. Rosehill was designed by landscape architect William Saunders (1822–1900). The garden-style layout, popular in the Victorian era, featured winding roads and paths, large trees, ponds, and expansive lawns. Several natural woodland areas, part of the original design, still exist today at Rosehill. A Gothic Revival style Entrance Gate and Administration Building, designed by architect William W. Boyington, was built in 1864 on Ravenswood Avenue.

During the late 1850s, Chicago city officials decided to close the old City cemetery for health reasons and relocate burials and monuments to suburban cemeteries. The first relocations of interments from the City Cemetery began when Rosehill started selling plots in 1859. Exhumed bodies were transported by wagon to other cemeteries, including Graceland, Oak Woods, and Rosehill cemeteries.

=== Rose Hill train station ===
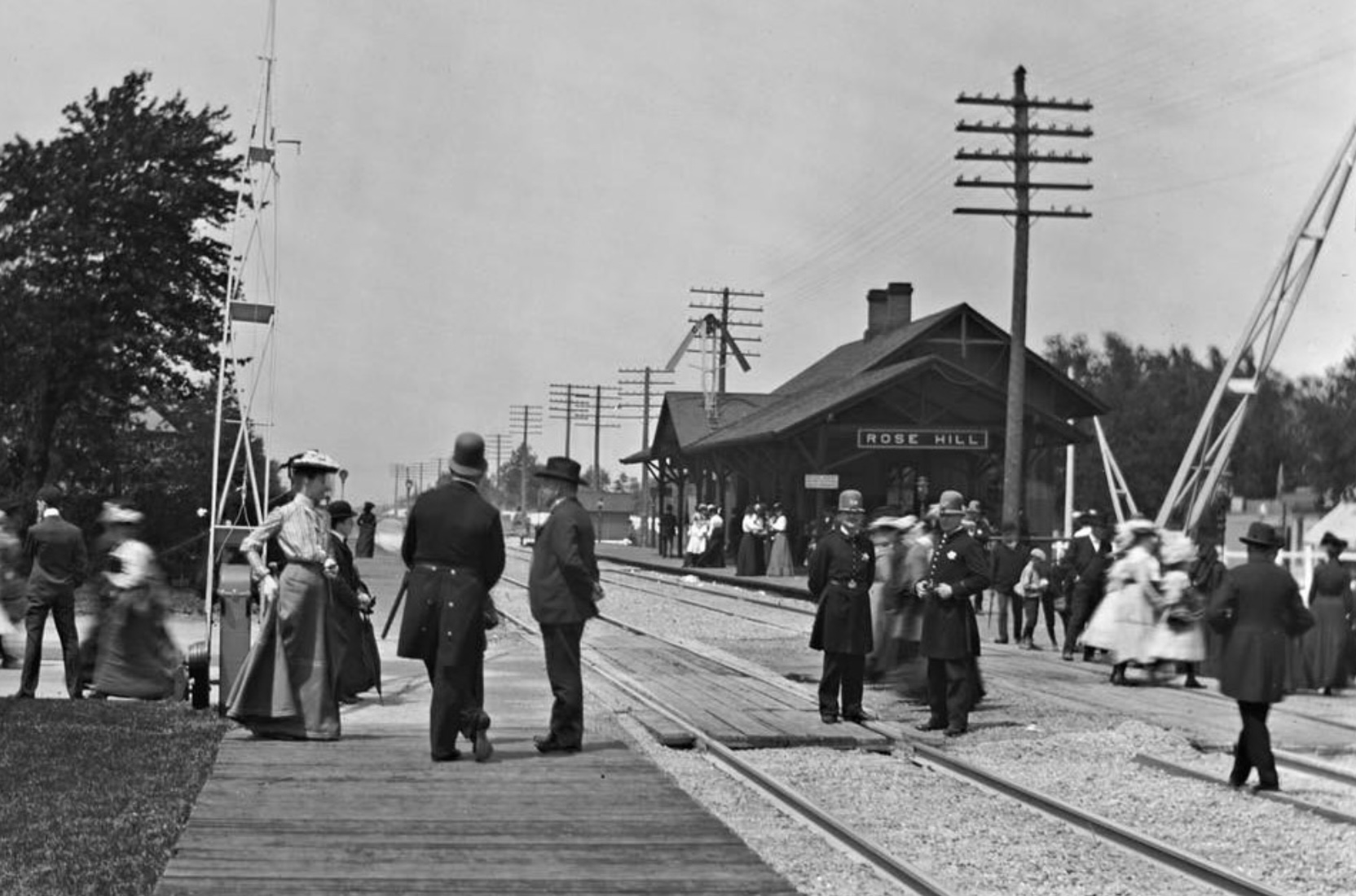
Rose Hill train station, 1885

A train station located at Rosehill Drive and Ravenswood Avenue opened in 1855 as a stop on the Chicago and Milwaukee Railway. The station was originally named Chittenden after the surrounding town. When Rosehill cemetery opened in 1859, the railway had become the Chicago and North Western Railway and the station's name was changed to Rose Hill. A custom-built train with a casket compartment traveled daily from Chicago Northwestern Station, transporting funeral parties, cemetery visitors and the deceased directly to the Rose hill station. When the line was elevated in 1896, a new station was constructed in limestone to match the material and castellated Gothic style of Rosehill's Entrance Gate and Administration building. A new casket elevator was installed, making it easier to lower coffins from the train platform down to the cemetery grounds for burial. The train station closed in 1958. What currently remains of the old train station is the stairway and castellated Gothic style elevator building.

=== Entrance Gate ===
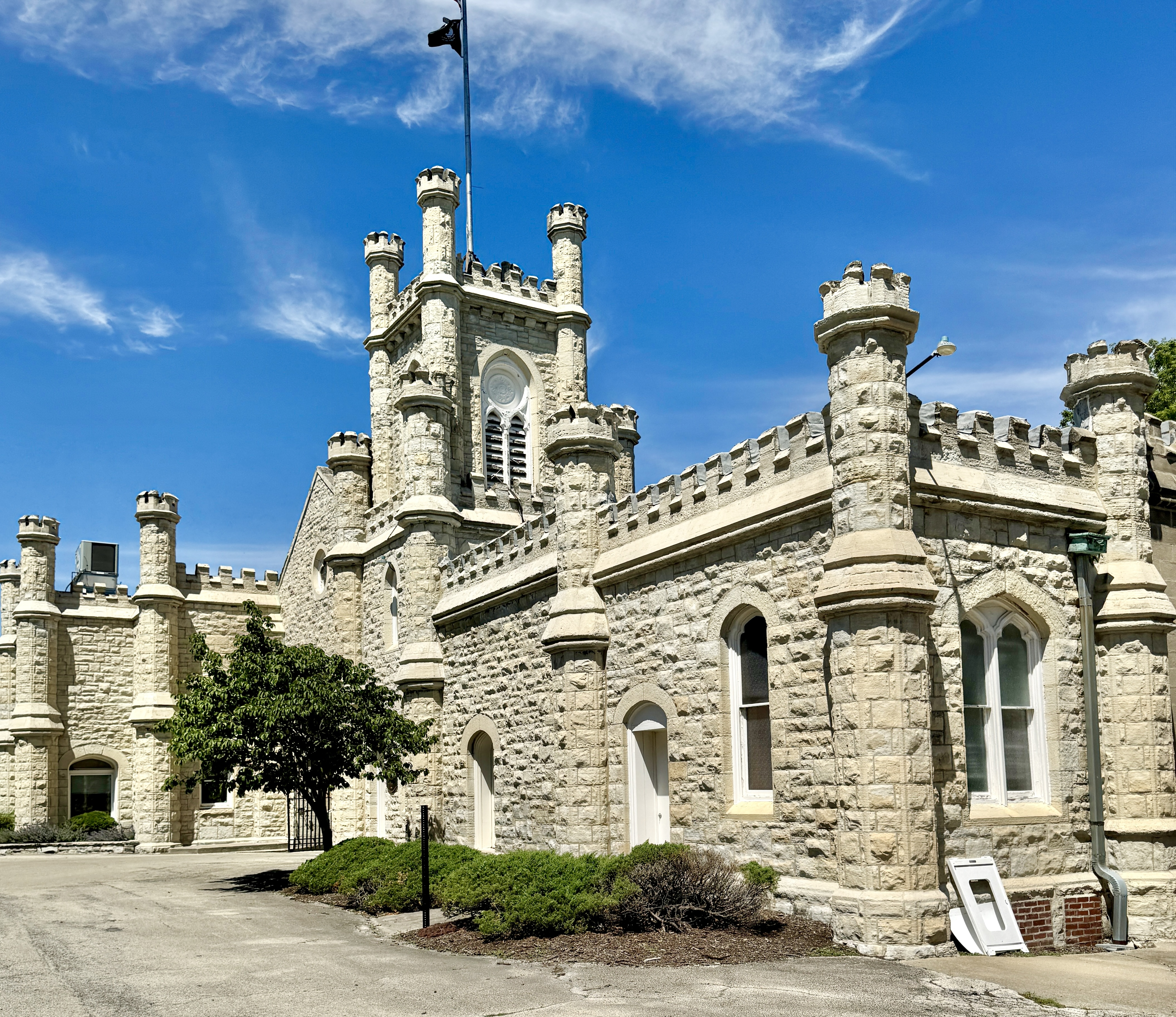
Entrance and Administrative Building

The Entrance Gate (or East Gatehouse) and Administration Building, designed by architect William W. Boyington (1818–1898) was built in 1864. It is an excellent example of Castellated Gothic architecture, which is rare in the Midwest. The architectural style, modeled after medieval castles was popular in the Victorian era. The gatehouse was constructed in Lemont limestone, a locally quarried yellow limestone. Boyington also designed the Chicago Water Tower in 1869, using the same castellated Gothic style and matching limestone. The Rosehill Cemetery Administration Building and Entry Gate was listed on the U.S. National Register of Historic Places in 1975. It was also granted Chicago Landmark status in 1980.

=== Community Mausoleum ===
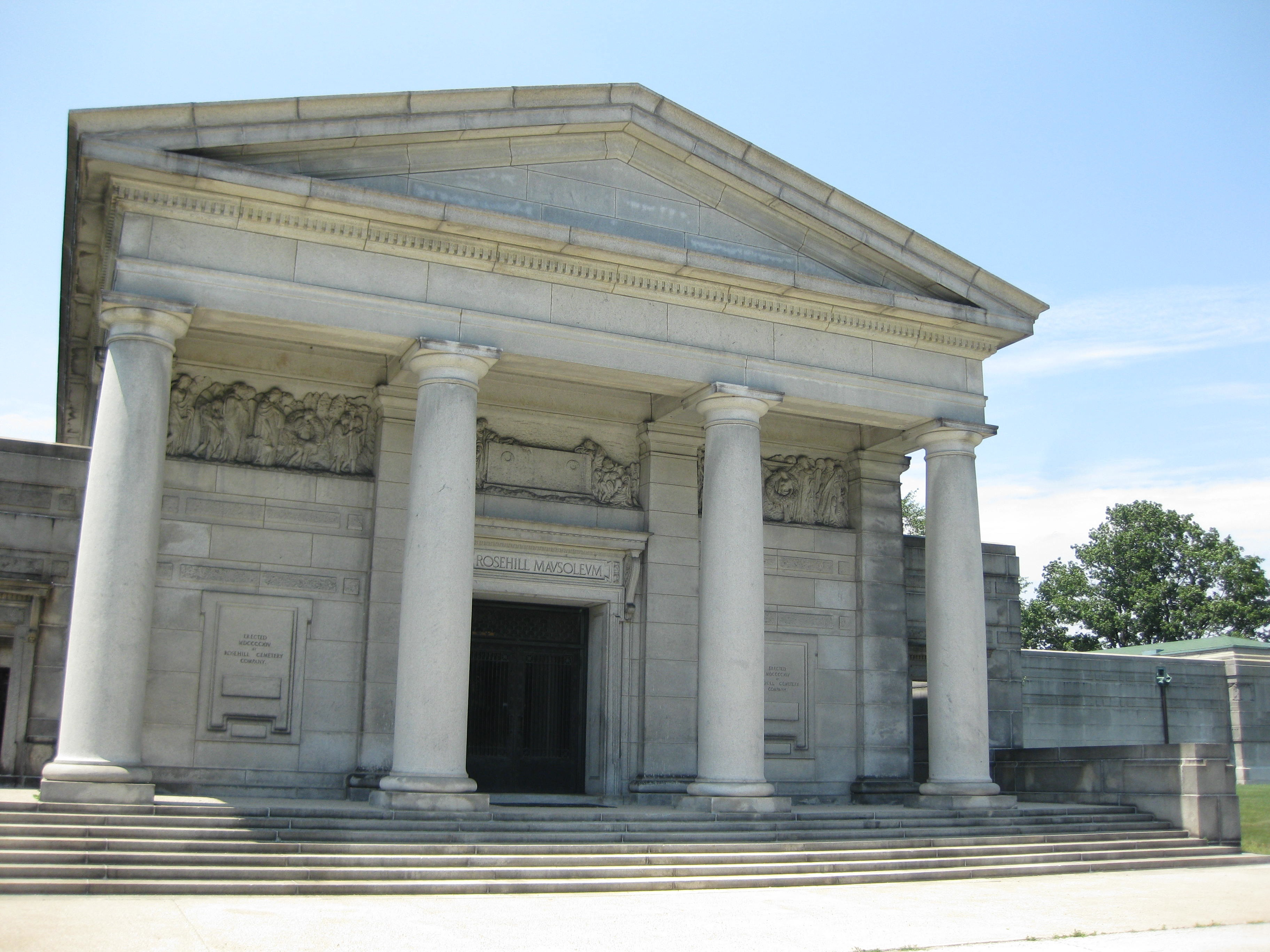
Original entrance to the mausoleum

Built in 1914, the mausoleum was designed by architect Sidney Lovell (1867–1938). It is the largest mausoleum in Chicago and features an elaborate Greek Revival entrance. Visitors now enter through the modern expansion. The building has two levels, the lower level being partially underground. The Mausoleum's interior is filled with French and Italian marble crypts with floors made of Roman Travertine. Several of the individual crypts have sculptured bronze and brass doors. The mausoleum has undergone eight expansions since it opened. It contains 13,000 crypts and two chapels. There are many family-owned crypts with decorative bronze gates, featuring over 30 stained glass windows, several designed by Louis Comfort Tiffany.

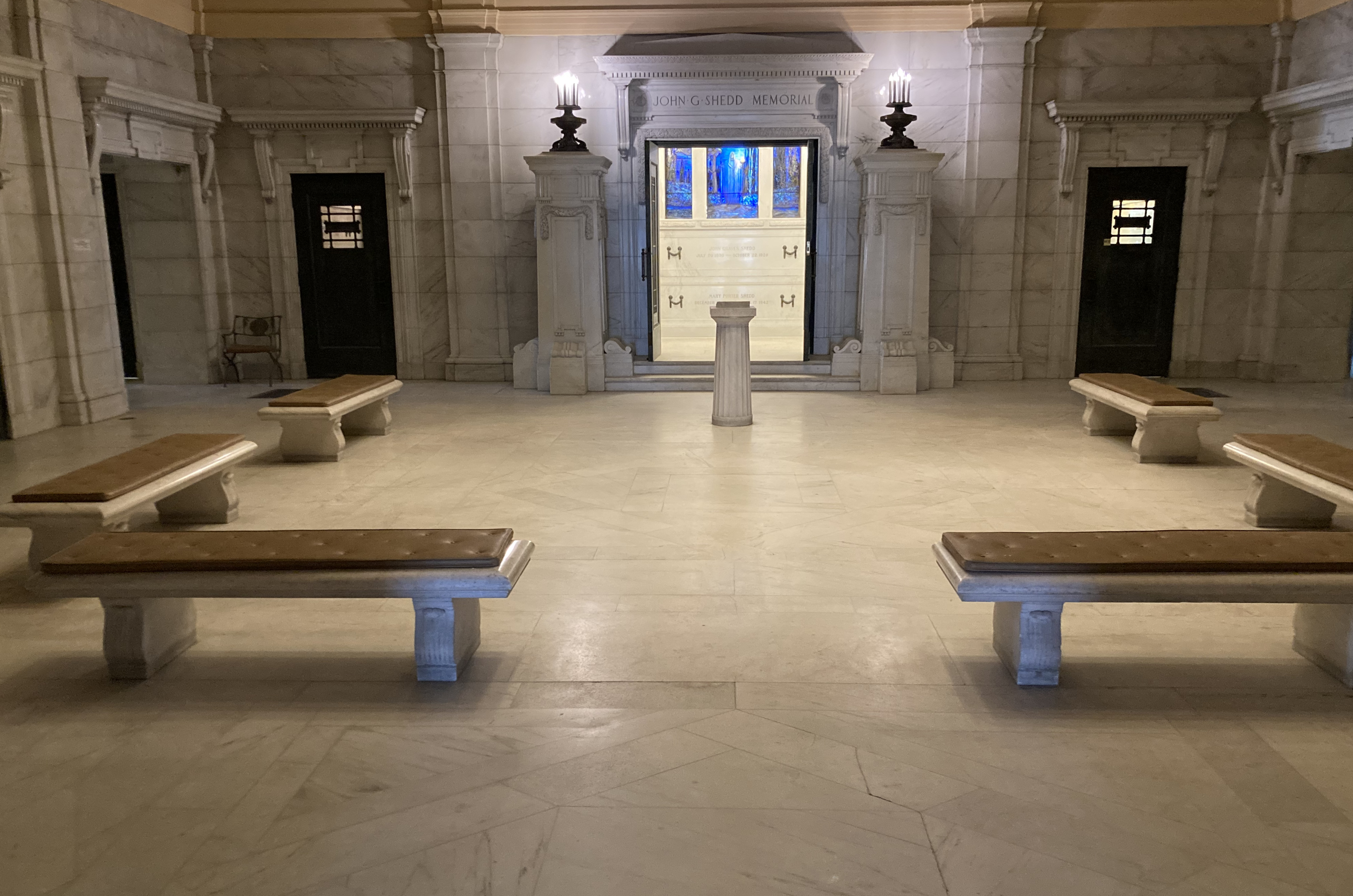
John Shedd memorial chapel

Notable interments include Aaron Montgomery Ward, Richard Warren Sears, Milton Florsheim, and John G. Shedd, president of Marshall Field & Company and principal donor of Chicago's Shedd Aquarium in the early 1920s. The John G. Shedd Memorial Chapel consists of the Shedd family crypt and a memorial chapel. The chapel is decorated with a stained glass skylight, marble floors, marble walls and marble benches with leather cushions. The family crypt sits behind decorative bronze doors flanked by tall marble pillars topped with brightly lit urns. According to Matt Hucke, author of Graveyards of Chicago, "the philanthropist commissioned a one-of-a-kind stained glass window from Tiffany that would bathe his crypt in blue light at sunset. The underwater theme of the family room is echoed in the skylight anteroom; even its chairs are adorned with the fanciful oceanic motifs of seahorses and shells."

=== Horatio N. May Chapel ===
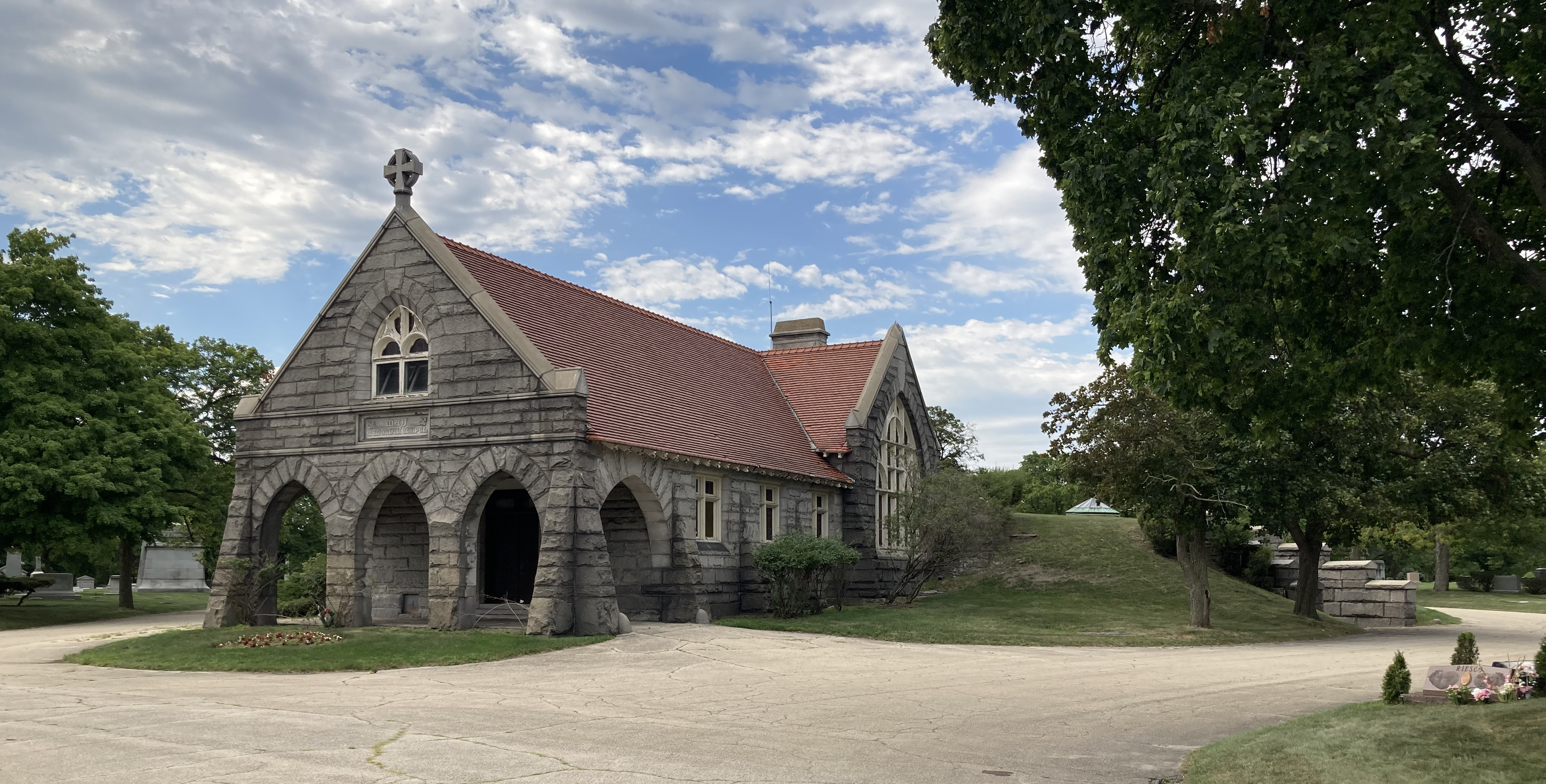
Horatio N. May Chapel

Built in 1899 at a cost of $30,000, the Horatio N. May Chapel was designed by architect Joseph Lyman Silsbee. The chapel is a blend of Gothic and Romanesque styles, with an exterior of light-colored granite. The carriage porch with heavy gothic arches spans the entire width of the chapel's front façade. The chapel interior features stained glass, mosaic floors and an oak roof with "hammer-beam trusses and curved brackets." The chapel's vault was used in the past to store caskets during winter months when the ground was frozen.

== Monuments and memorials ==
=== Civil War memorials ===
At the beginning of the Civil War, the Rosehill cemetery company donated military plots for the burial of U.S. soldiers. Many of these graves are located near the Entrance Gate. The original sandstone headstones became unreadable with age and have been replaced over time. There are approximately 350 Union soldiers and sailors buried at Rosehill. These burials include sixteen Union generals, a few Confederate soldiers and 15 unknown Civil War soldiers . It is the final resting place for several members of the 8th Illinois Cavalry, the unit that fired the first shots in the Battle of Gettysburg. Rosehill Cemetery is known for being the largest private burial ground of Union veterans in the state of Illinois.

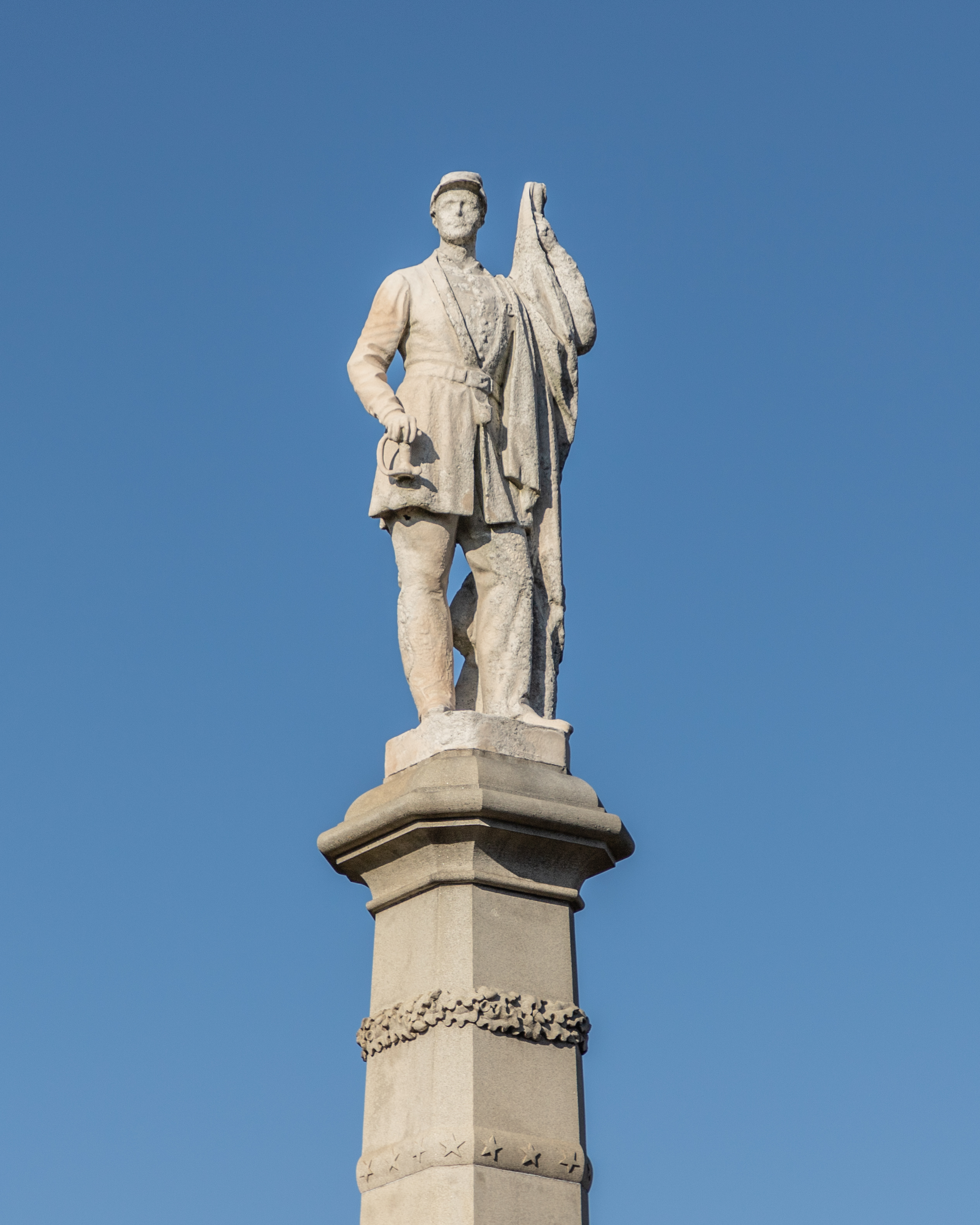
Our Heroes monument

==== Soldiers and Sailors monument ====
The Soldier and Sailors monument, also called "Our Heroes", was originally named the General Military Monument when it was dedicated May 31, 1870 in memory of the deceased soldiers of Cook County, Illinois. Designed by sculptor, Leonard Volk (1828–1895), the monument is built of solid granite, with the statue made of Italian marble. It is approximately 40 feet in height. The base and pedestal support a tall column on which stands a statue representing a Color Sergeant dressed in regulation uniform, holding a loosely draped flag, his right hand resting on his sword hilt. The pedestal is engraved with four sculpted panels in standard bronze, representing the four principal branches of the military service – the infantry, cavalry, artillery, and marine. The words, "Our Heroes", are engraved in raised letters on the pedestal cap-stone. The statute and the bas-reliefs for the pedestal are the work of Volk, who is famous for creating one of the only life masks and hand casts of President Abraham Lincoln.

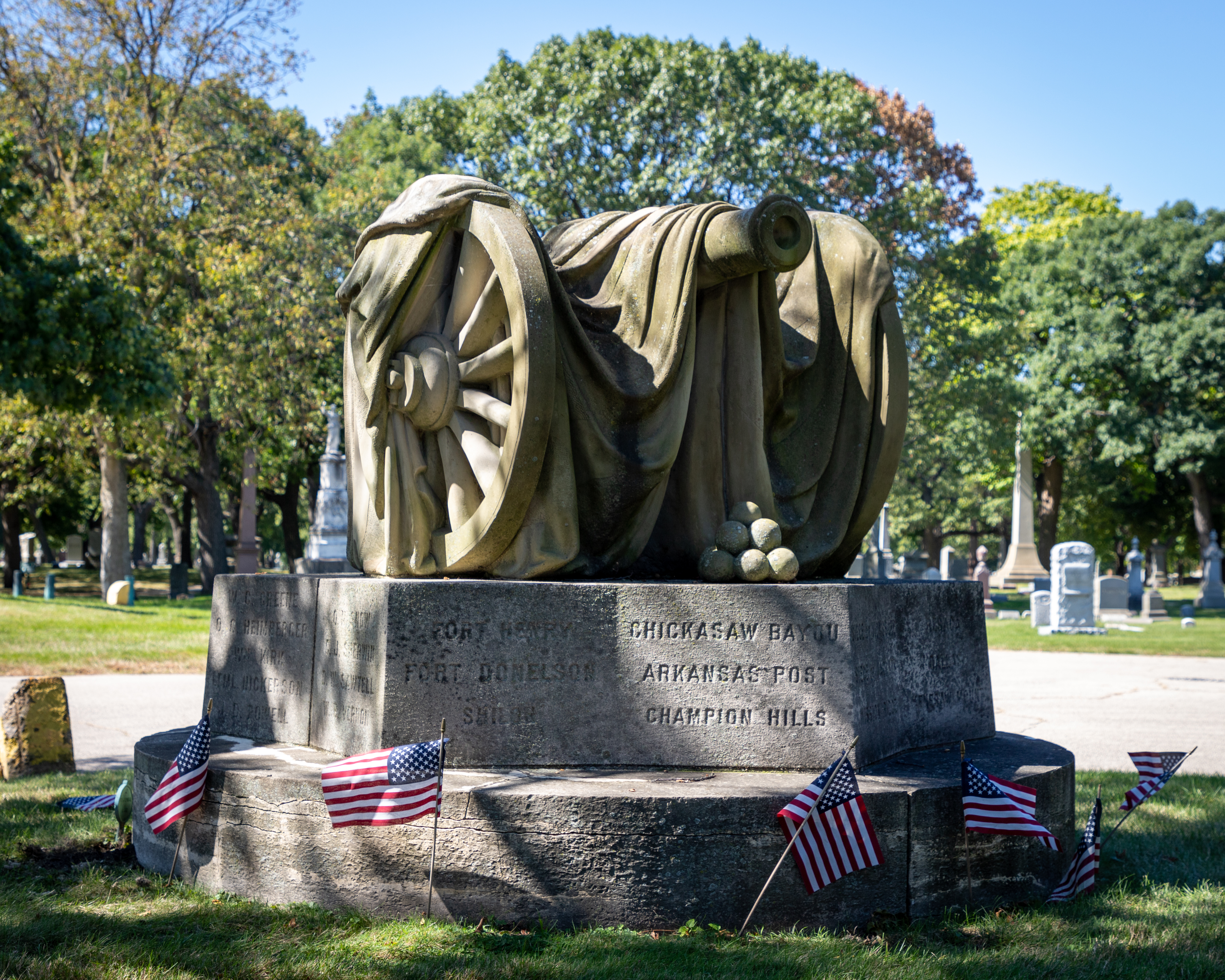
Chicago Light Artillery Monument

==== Chicago light artillery monument ====
Erected to the memory of "Company A", Chicago Light Artillery, the Chicago Light artillery monument was dedicated on May 31, 1874. It was created by sculptor, Leonard Volk, and was constructed of solid sandstone and consists of a draped field gun on a solid hexagonal base, bearing the names of the members of "A" company. The military unit, formed by Captain James Smith, was the first in Chicago to take part in the Civil War, mustering on April 21, 1861. In Smith's will, he made a $2000 bequest for the purpose of building and installing the monument at Rosehill cemetery.

==== Bridges' Battery monument ====
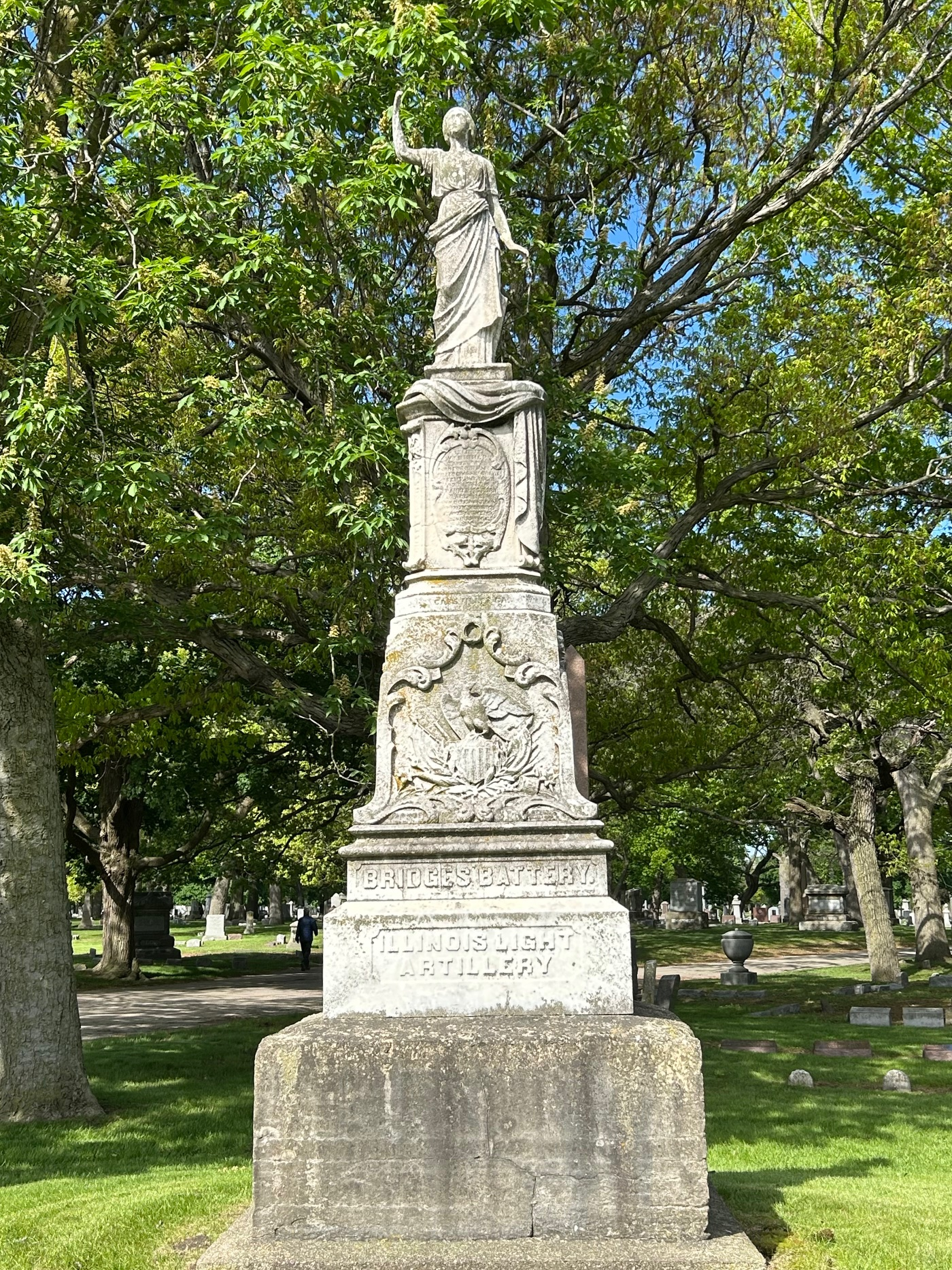
Bridges'Battery monument

The monument was built by the Cook County and the Board of Trade of Chicago in memory the deceased soldiers of the Bridges' Battery Illinois Light Artillery. The artillery unit was mustered into service in January, 1863, and served in Tennessee and Georgia. Installed in 1869–1870, the monument cost $3,000 and stands approximately twenty feet tall. It designates the burial site of twenty-five or more members of Bridges' Battery Illinois Light Artillery. A joint dedication for the Bridges' Battery monument and the General Military Monument ("Our Heroes" monument) was celebrated at Rosehill cemetery on May 31, 1870.

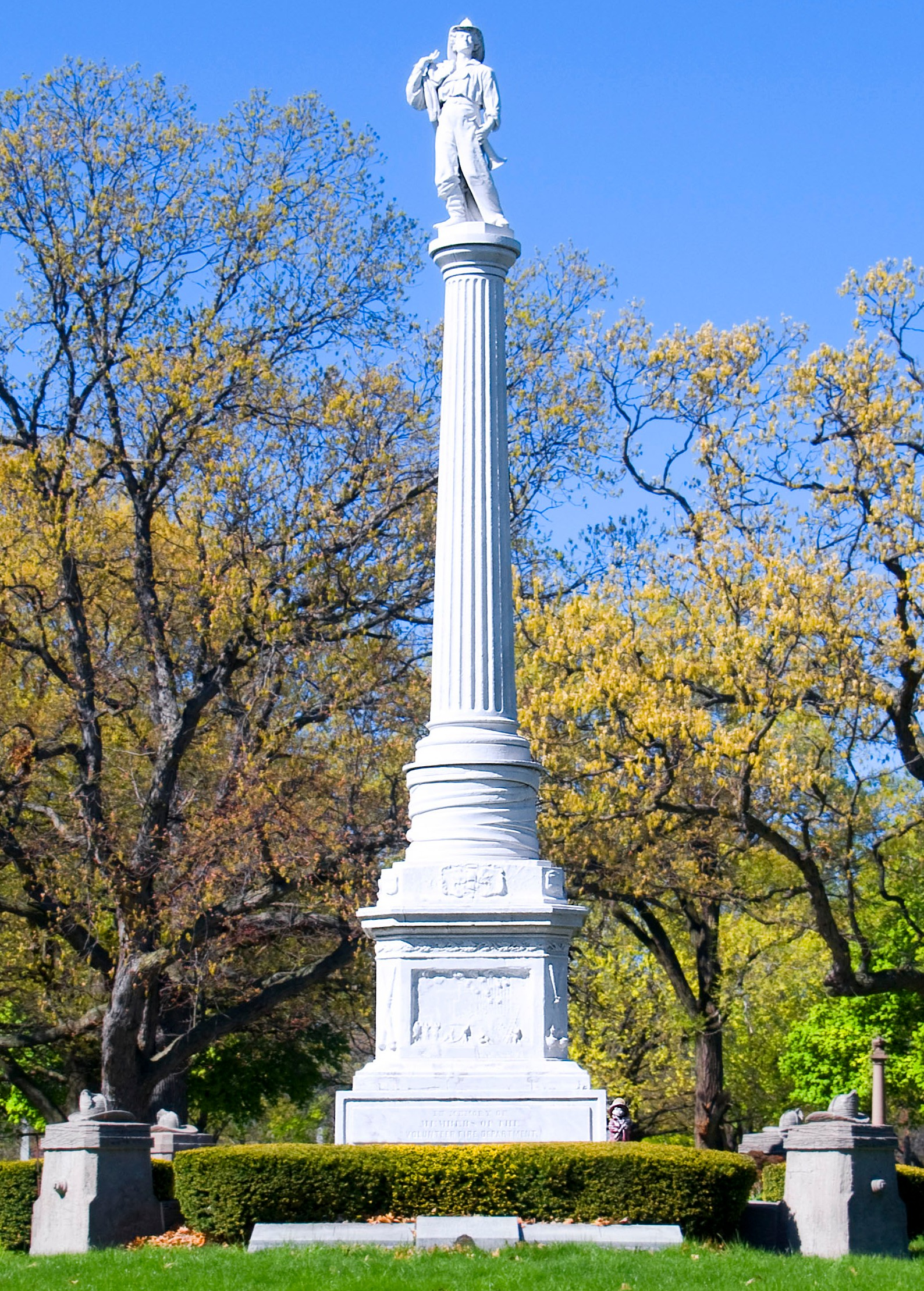
Volunteer Firemen's Monument

=== Chicago Volunteer Firefighters Memorial ===
A monument "To Honor All the Courageous Volunteer Firefighters of Chicago" was donated by the Firemen's Benevolent Association in 1858 in memory of the volunteer firemen who in 1857 had lost their lives in the line of duty. This tragedy led the city of Chicago to create a professional fire department. It also marks the grave of 15 firefighters. The monument was created by sculptor Leonard Volk and was erected at Rosehill in 1864. It features a fireman with a fire hose standing on a tall column and includes sculpted panels at the base. The monument was restored and updated in 1979. A new granite marker was added with a list of the firefighters' names.

== West Ridge Nature Park ==
In 2015, the Chicago Park District Park No. 568 – West Ridge Nature Park was established along the north western edge of Rosehill Cemetery. Before its conversion to parkland, the 21-acre wooded site remained undeveloped and had never been used for burials. Improvements to the preserve include a 1.1 mile loop trail, the planting of 500 native trees and shrubs, overlooks and designated fishing areas.

== Notable burials ==
- Max Adler, Chicago businessman, founder of the Adler Planetarium in Chicago, Illinois. (1866–1952)
- J. Frank Aldrich, U.S. Congressman, Illinois 1st Congressional District (1893–97)
- William Aldrich, U.S. Congressman, Illinois 1st Congressional District (1877–83)
- George Bangs, Railway Mail Service
- George Bell Jr., United States Army Major General who commanded the 33rd Infantry Division in World War I
- John Lourie Beveridge, Illinois Governor (1873–77)
- Lester L. Bond, Chicago Mayor (1873)
- Levi Boone, Chicago Mayor (1855–56), anti-immigrant American Party (a.k.a. The Know-Nothing Party)
- Mary McVicker Booth, actress
- William W. Boyington, architect, Chicago Water Tower and Rosehill Cemetery entrance
- Myra Colby Bradwell, Illinois lawyer and political activist, founder of Chicago Legal News
- James B. Bradwell, Illinois lawyer, judge, and politician
- Jack Brickhouse, Hall of Fame sports broadcaster
- Avery Brundage, athlete, construction contractor, president of the United States Olympic Committee (USOC) and International Olympic Committee (IOC)
- Henry Buker, baseball shortstop. right fielder 1884 Detroit Wolverines
- Jacob Burck, Pulitzer prize-winning editorial cartoonist and artist for St. Louis Post-Dispatch and the Chicago Sun-Times
- Leo Burnett, advertising executive, founder of Leo Burnett Worldwide
- Edward Dean Cooke, U.S. Congressman, Illinois 6th Congressional District (1895–97)
- Joseph Cummings, president of Wesleyan University (1857–75), president of Northwestern University (1881–90)
- Albert Blake Dick, founder of A.B. Dick Company, coined the word "mimeograph"
- Jim Dooley, Chicago Bears football player, coach
- Harvey Doolittle Colvin, Chicago Mayor (1873–75)
- Dewitt Clinton Cregier, Chicago Mayor (1889–91)
- George R. Davis, U.S. Congressman, Illinois (1879–85), Director General, World's Columbian Exposition
- Charles G. Dawes, 30th Vice President of the United States
- Ira B. Eddy, businessman and spiritualist
- Martin Emerich, Maryland House of Delegates, U.S. Congressman, Illinois 1st Congressional District (1903–05)
- Charles Benjamin Farwell, U.S. Congressman, U.S. Senator from Illinois
- Bernhard Felsenthal, rabbi
- William R. Ferguson, religious leader
- Milton S. Florsheim, founder of Florsheim Shoe Company
- Bobby Franks, murder victim of Leopold and Loeb
- Lyman J. Gage, U.S. Secretary of the Treasury (1897–02), banker, president of the World's Columbian Exposition
- Augustus Garrett, Chicago Mayor (1843–44, 1845–46)
- Samuel Robert Gibson, folk singer Gibson and Camp at the Gate of Horn
- Harry Grabiner, Major League Baseball executive, first general manager of Chicago White Sox
- Elisha Gray, inventor, founder Western Electric
- Dwight H. Green, Governor of Illinois (1941–49)
- Charles Frederick Gunther confectionery manufacturing magnate, created Cracker Jack
- John Charles Haines, Chicago Mayor (1858–60)
- Winifred M. Hausam, one of the most creative educators in Southern California and credited with organizing many vocational and counseling bureaus
- John D. Hertz, founder Yellow Cab, Hertz Rent-A-Car; Re-interred at Woodlawn Cemetery, The Bronx, New York
- Ida Sophia Hippach, RMS Titanic survivor
- Jerome Holtzman, Baseball Hall of Fame sportswriter, known as "The Dean" of baseball press boxes
- Nat Hudson, Major League Baseball pitcher (1886–89) for the St. Louis Browns.
- Charles J. Hull, real estate magnate, Hull House owner
- Edward Jump, artist, cartoonist
- John H. Kedzie, lawyer, real-estate developer, politician (namesake: Kedzie Avenue in Chicago and Kedzie Street, Evanston)
- Harry Stephen Keeler, pulp mystery writer, The Case Of The Barking Clock, The Man With The Magic Eardrums
- Edward Kimball (1823–1901), Sunday School teacher and church debt raiser
- Edward N. Kirk, Union Army brigadier general, U.S. Civil War
- Philip Knopf, U.S. Congressman Illinois 7th Congressional District (1903–09)
- Leonidas Lee, Major League Baseball player (1877)
- Benjamin F. Lindheimer, Chicago horse racing and football executive
- Benjamin Berl Lipsner (1887–1971), first supervisor of the U.S. Post Office Department
- Sidney Lovell, architect of Rosehill Mausoleum
- Alexander Loyd, Chicago Mayor (1840–41)
- Benjamin Drake Magruder, Illinois Supreme Court Justice
- George W. Maher, architect, Prairie School-style
- Robert Marsh, victim in the Herrin Massacre (unmarked grave)
- Roswell B. Mason, Chicago Mayor (1869–71), mayor during Great Chicago Fire
- Victor Andre Matteson, architect Cardinal Hill Reservoir
- Oscar F. Mayer, business magnate, founder Oscar Mayer Company
- John McArthur Union general, U.S. Civil War
- Edward McWade, actor Arsenic and Old Lace, Yankee Doodle Dandy, Mr. and Mrs. North; spouse of Margaret
- Margaret McWade, actress Mr. Deeds Goes to Town; wife of Edward
- Robert McWade, theater, film actor Grand Hotel, The Lemon Drop Kid; brother of Edward
- Darius Miller, railroad president
- Isaac Lawrence Milliken, Chicago Mayor (1854–55)
- Buckner Stith Morris, Chicago Mayor (1838–39)
- Richard B. Ogilvie, Governor of Illinois (1969–73)
- Martha O'Driscoll, actress: Li'l Abner, Ghost Catchers, House of Dracula, The Daltons Ride Again, Under Western Skies
- George Arthur Paddock, U.S. Congressman Illinois 10th District (1941–43)
- Legrand Winfield Perce, U.S. Congressman (1870–73)
- John W. Pollard and members of his prominent and pioneering family
- Eliza Emily Chappell Porter, first school teacher in Chicago (1835), established schools for African American children in the south
- Thomas E. G. Ransom, brevet major general in the US Civil War, division commander in the Thirteenth, Sixteenth and Seventeenth Corps, died 1864
- Henry Riggs Rathbone, U.S. Congressman, Illinois Congressman At-Large (1923–28)
- Ira G. Rawn, railroad president
- John Blake Rice, Chicago Mayor (1865–69)
- John A. Roche, Chicago Mayor (1887–89)
- Julius Rosenwald, merchant, early partner with Richard Sears, founder the Museum of Science and Industry in Jackson Park.
- Reinhart Schwimmer, gangster, St. Valentine's Day Massacre victim
- Ignaz Schwinn, founder of the Schwinn Bicycle Company
- Richard Warren Sears, founder of Sears, Roebuck and Company
- John G. Shedd, Chairman of Marshall Field & Company, philanthropist, founder of the Shedd Aquarium
- Milton Sills, actor "The Heart Bandit", "The Hawk's Nest", "The Sea Wolf"
- Edwin Silverman, co-founder of Essaness Theatres
- Daniel Sotomayor, cartoonist and LGBTQ activist
- William Grant Stratton, Illinois Governor (1953–61)
- Benjamin Sweet, lawyer, politician, administrator, colonel in the Union Army, two of whose daughters pioneered women's rights (1832–1874).
- George Bell Swift, Chicago Mayor (1893, 1895–97)
- Charles Marsh Thomson, U.S. Congressman Illinois 10th District (1913–15)
- Narcissa Niblack Thorne, designer of the Thorne miniature rooms, Art Institute of Chicago
- Burr Tillstrom, puppeteer, creator of Kukla, Fran and Ollie
- Victims of the Iroquois Theatre Fire (1903)
- Victims of the Eastland Disaster (1915)
- Leonard W. Volk, sculptor, notable for making one of only two life masks of U.S. President Abraham Lincoln
- E. S. Wadsworth, co-founder Wadsworth, Dyer & Chapin, namesake Wadsworth, Illinois
- Martin R. M. Wallace, Union brevet brigadier general, U.S. Civil War
- Aaron Montgomery Ward, founder Montgomery Ward and Company, the world's first mail order business
- John Wentworth (nicknamed "Long John"), U.S. Congressman, mayor of Chicago, marked by the tallest obelisk in the cemetery
- Julius White brigadier general Union Army, U.S. Civil War
- Frances Willard, temperance leader, suffragist, President of the Women's Christian Temperance Union
- Ned Williamson, Major League Baseball player (1878–90), MLB record holder for single-season home runs from 1884 to 1919.
- Henry Haven Windsor, founder, publisher of Popular Mechanics magazine
- Warren Wright Sr., Calumet Baking Powder Company, Calumet Farm (1875–1950)

== Gallery ==
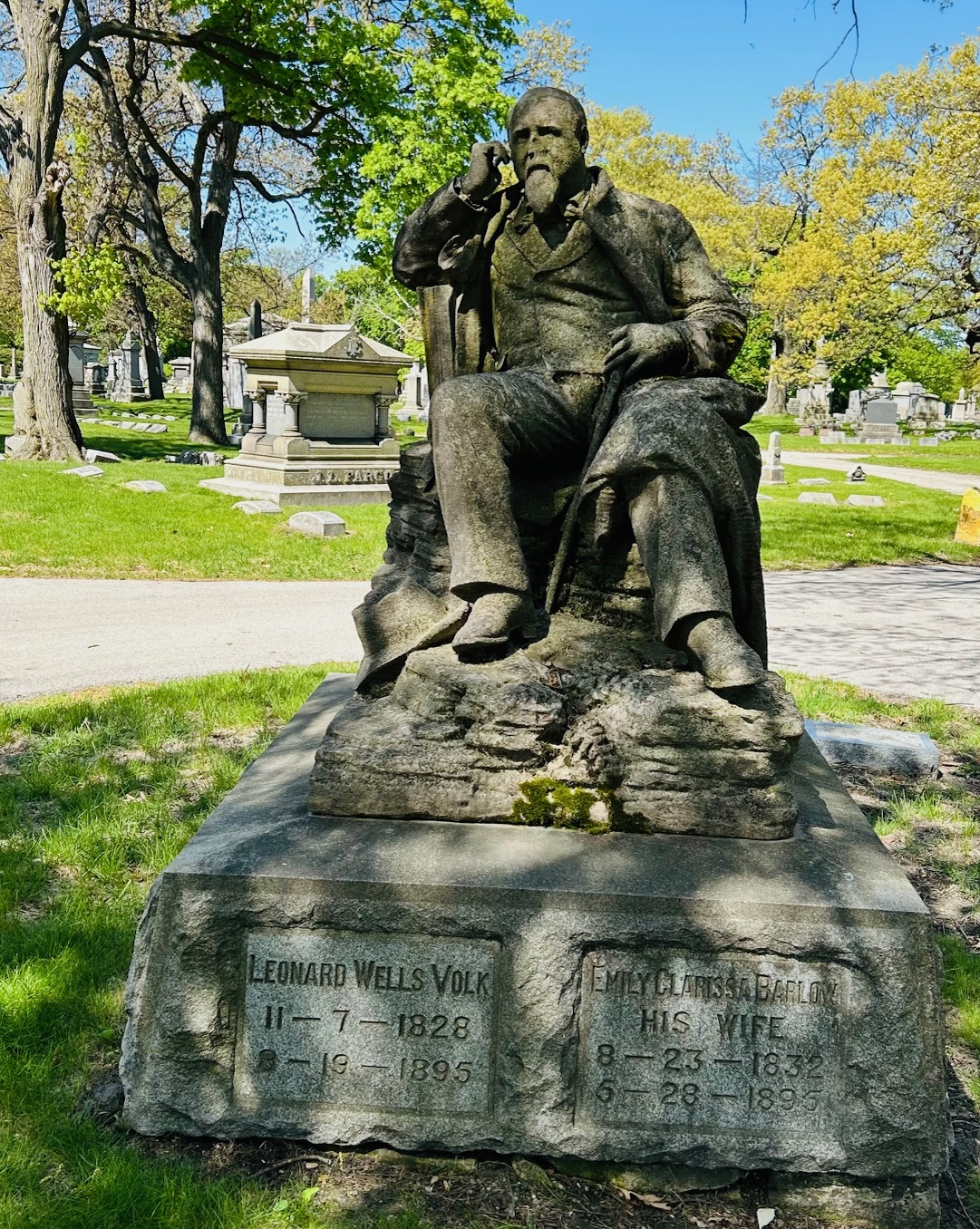
Leonard Volk monument

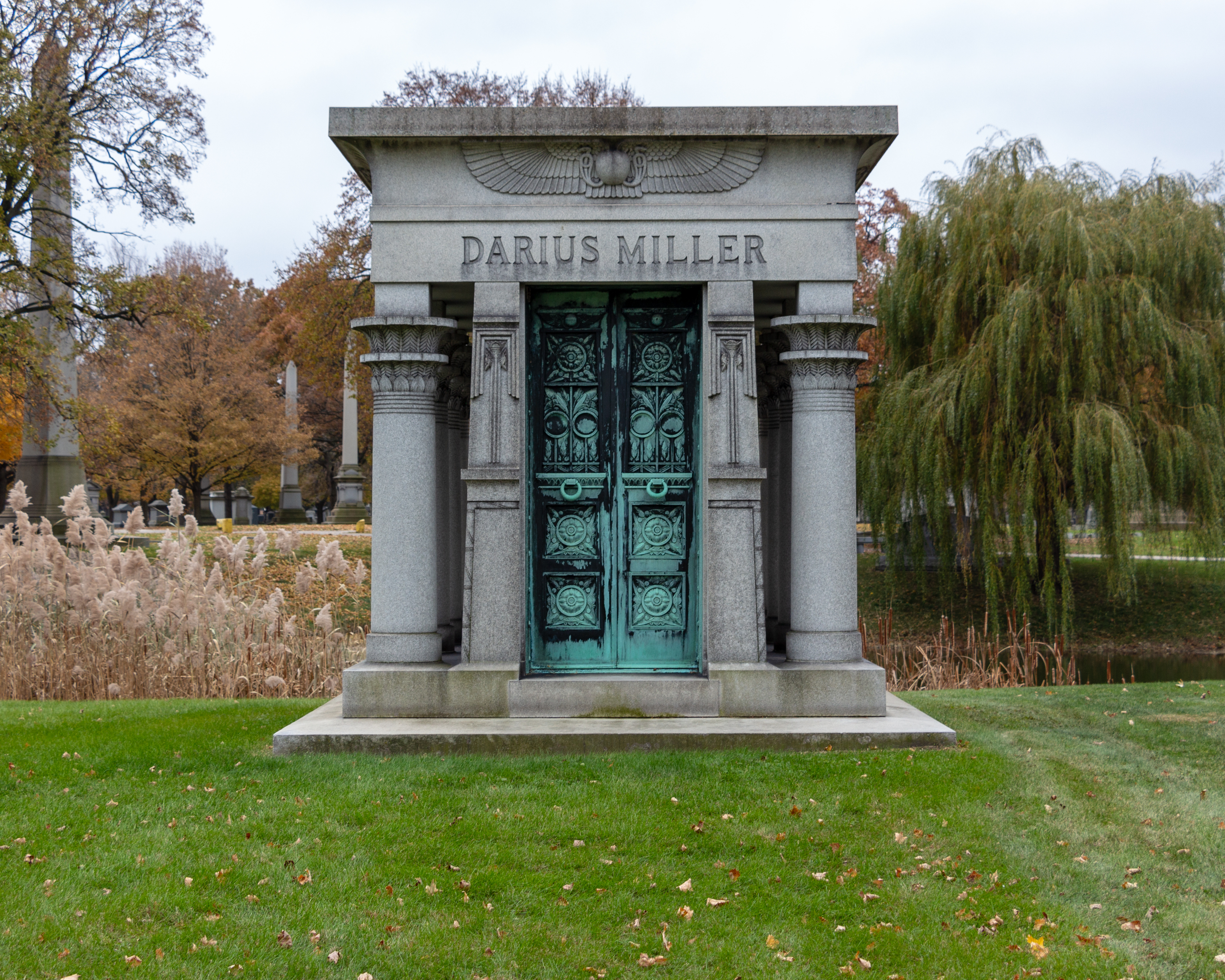
Darius Miller mausoleum

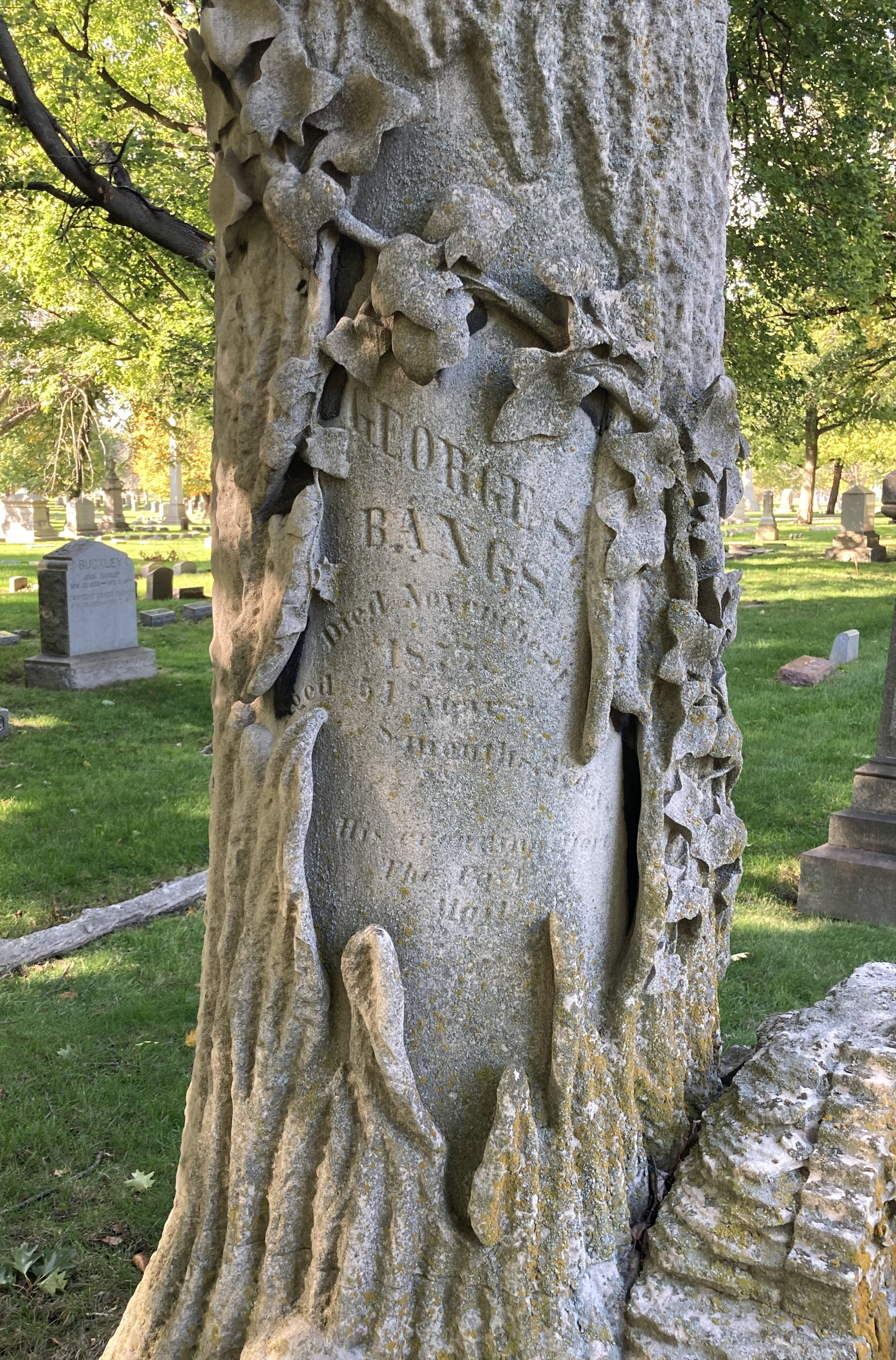
George S. Bangs grave

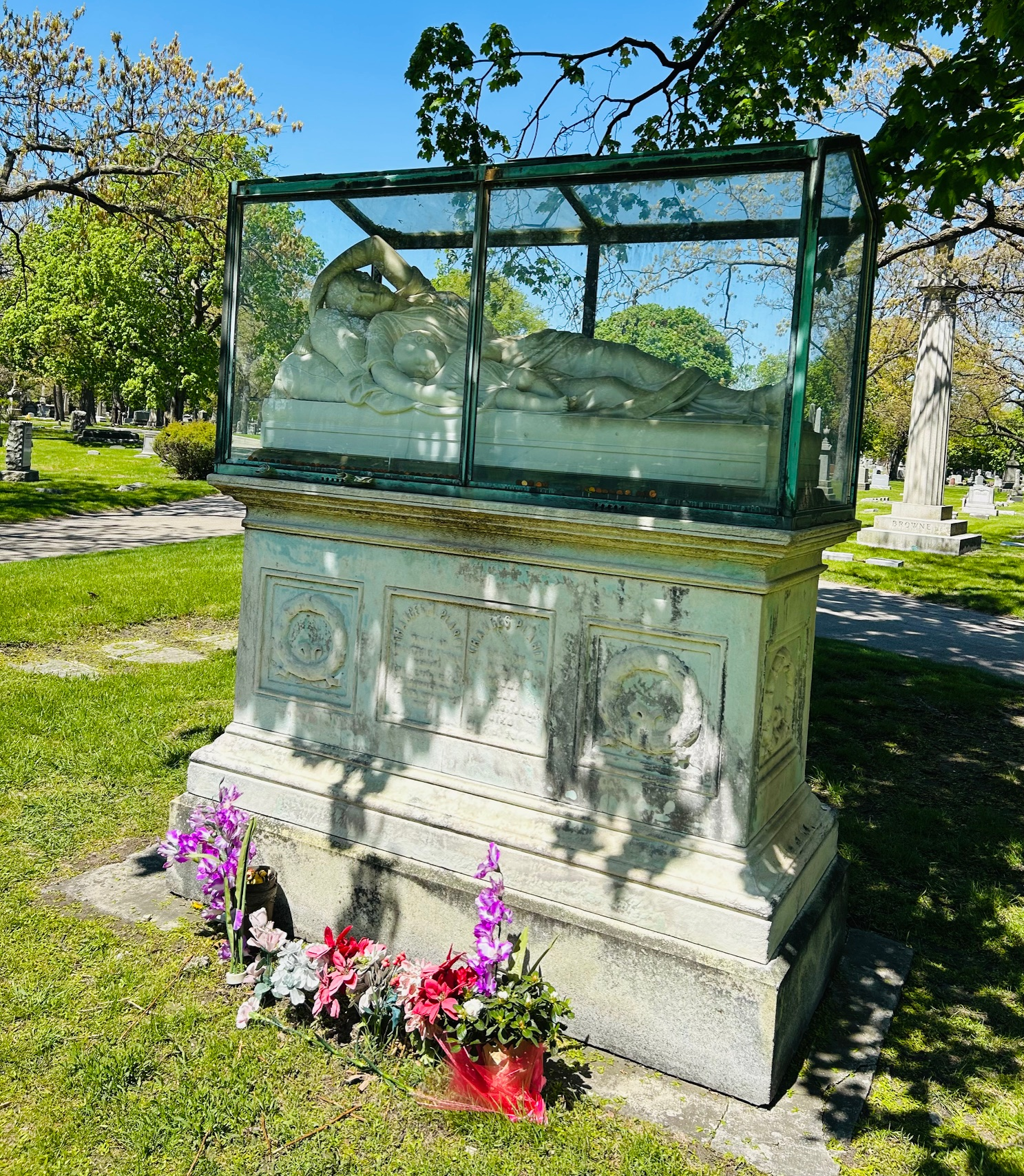
Frances Pearce monument

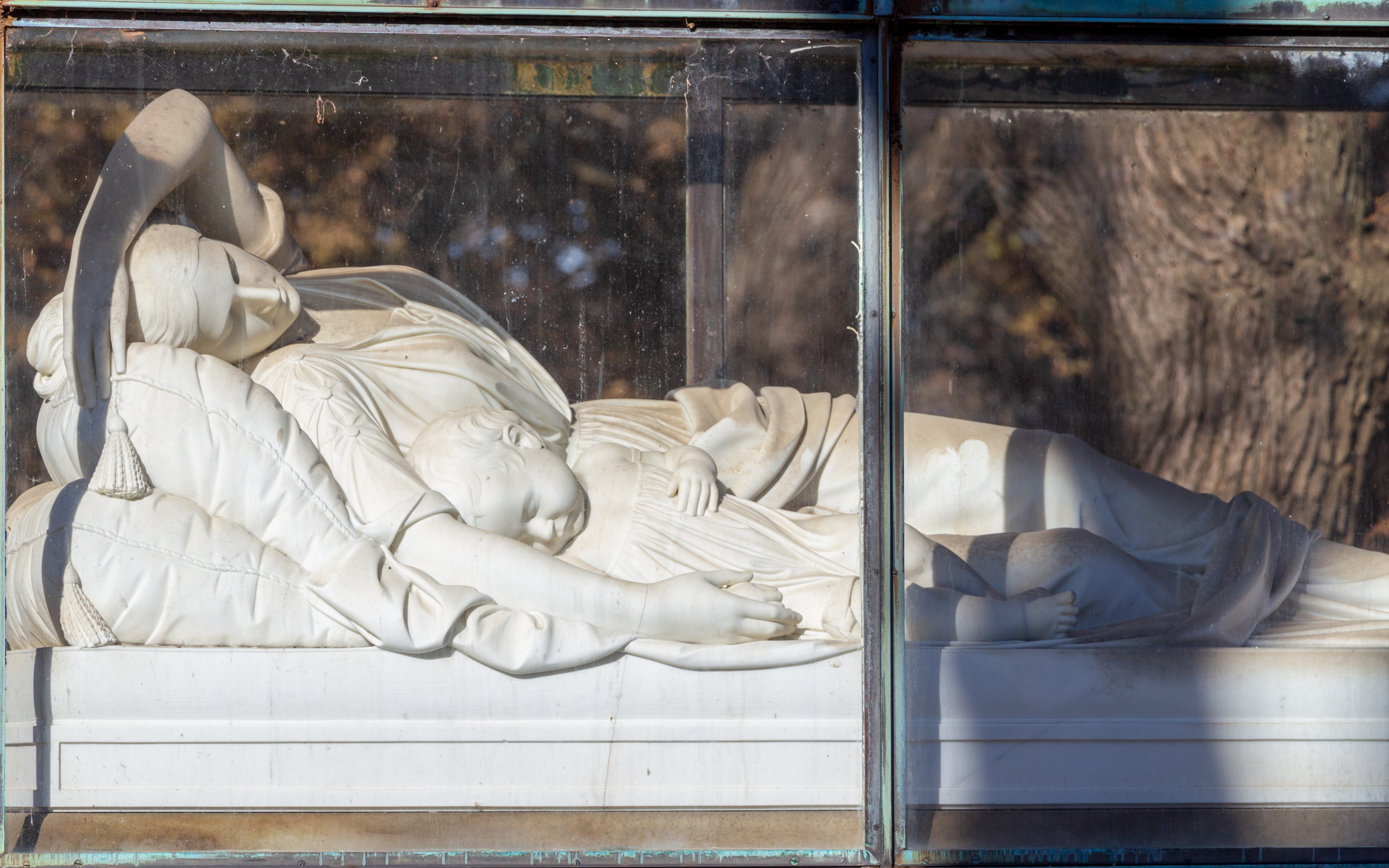
Frances Pearce and infant

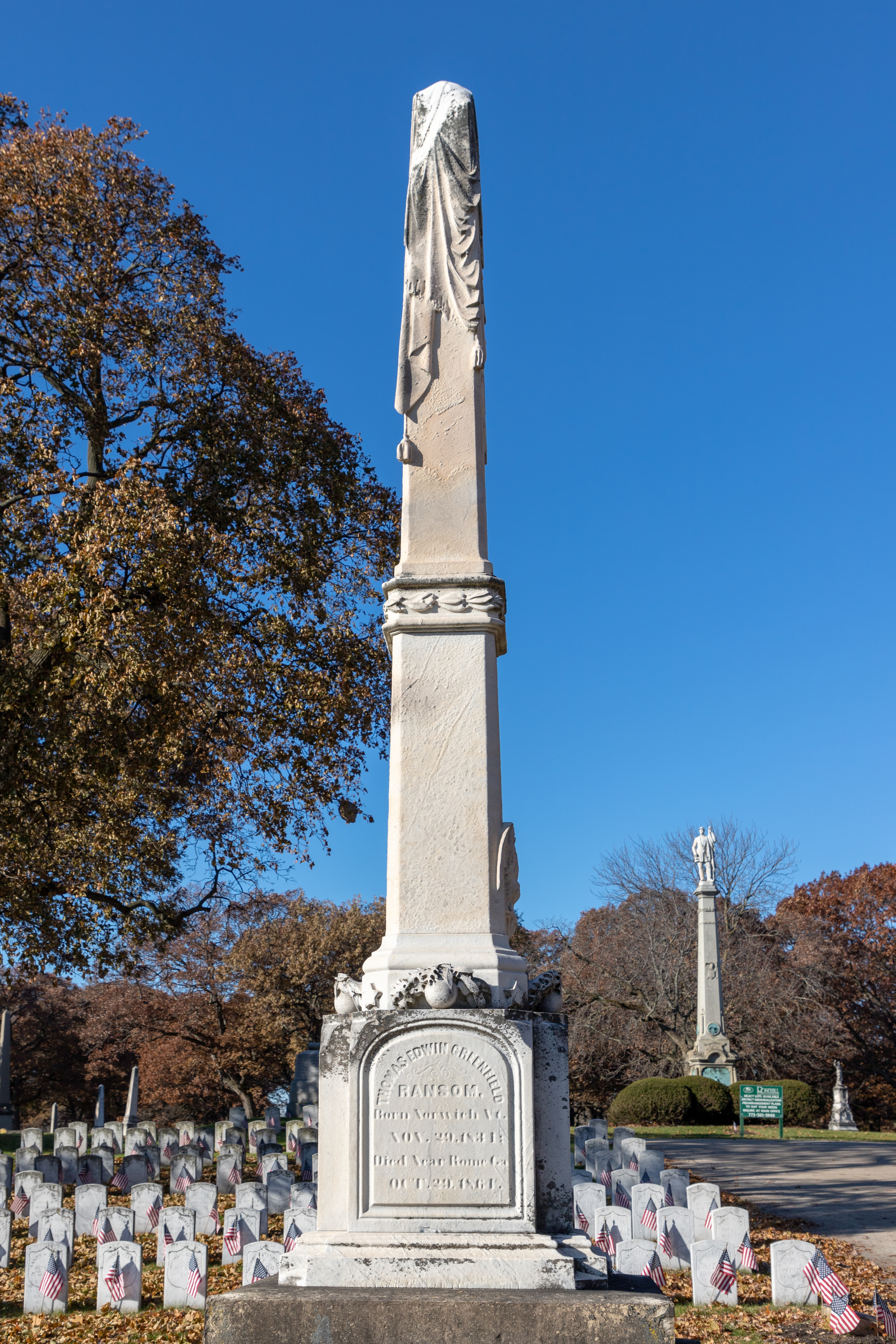
Thomas E. Ransom monument

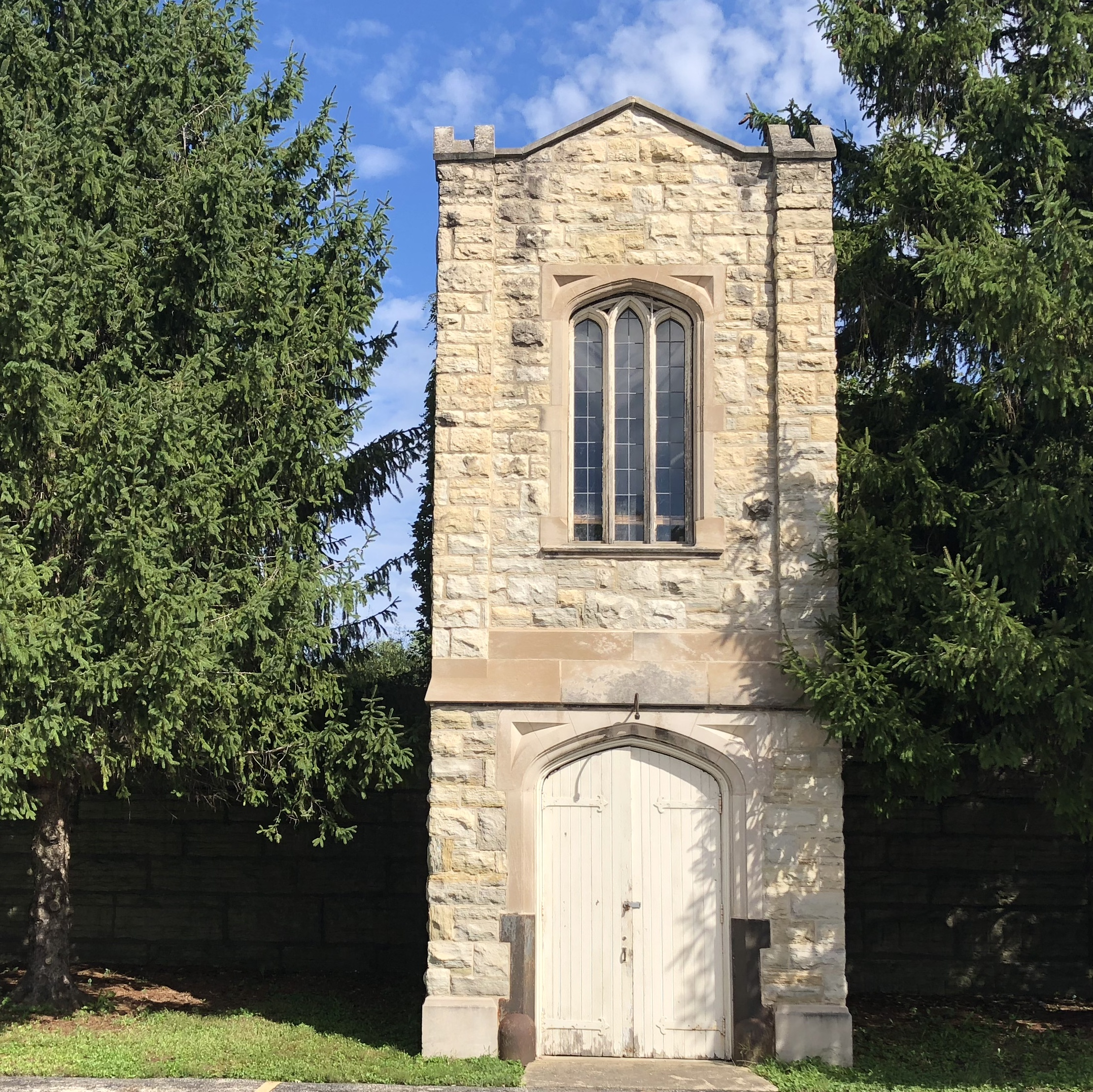
Casket elevator

== See also ==
- Graceland Cemetery
- List of burial places of presidents and vice presidents of the United States
- Rural cemetery
