= Bridges' Battery Illinois Light Artillery =

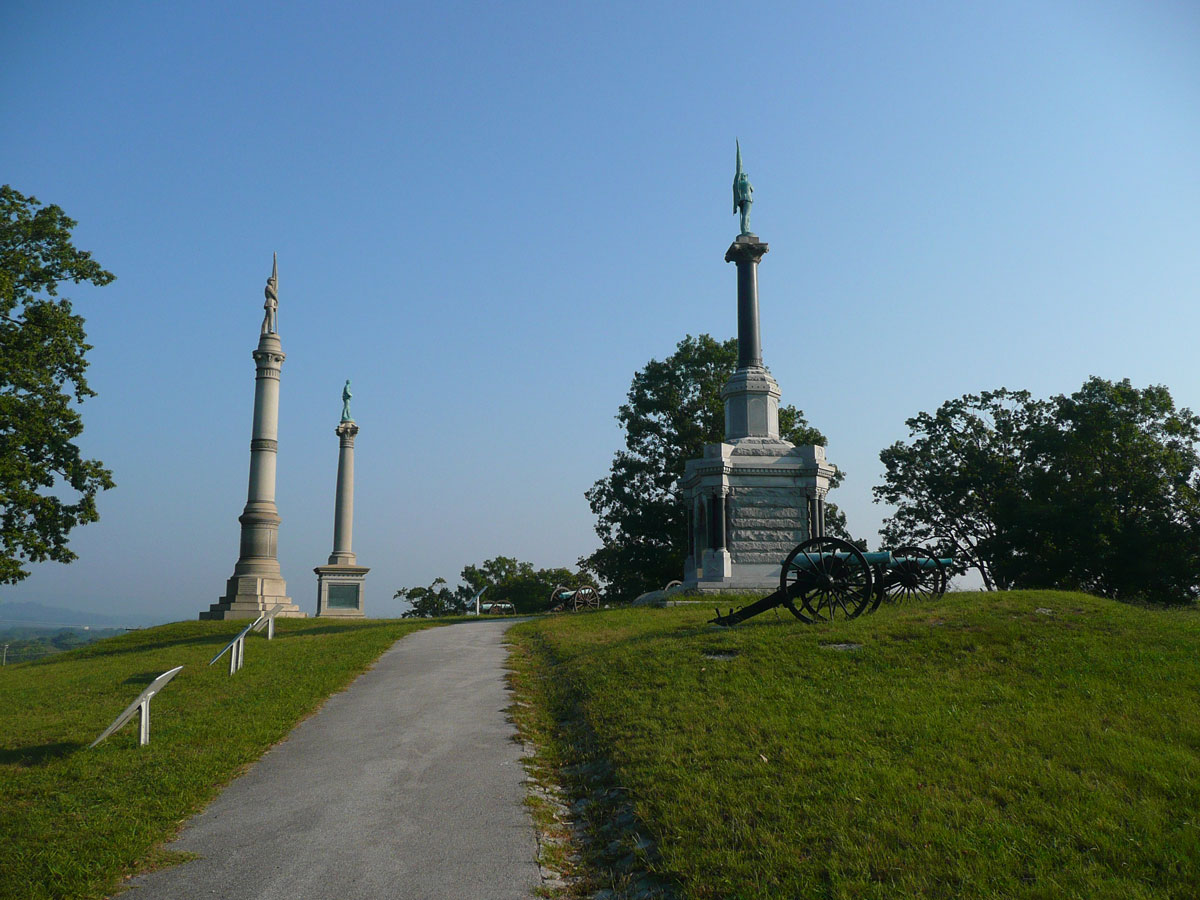
- Bridges' Battery monument is the middle of the three pictured, at Orchard Knob, Chickamauga and Chattanooga National Military Park.
- Active: 14 Jan. 1863 – 21 Dec. 1864
- Country: United States
- Allegiance: (United States) Union; Illinois
- Branch: Union Army
- Type: Field Artillery
- Size: Artillery Battery
- Equipment: 2 × M1841 6-pounder field guns 2 × M1841 12-pounder howitzers 2 × 3-inch Ordnance rifles (Jun. 1863); 2 × 12-pounder Napoleons; 4 × 3-inch Ordnance rifles (Sep. 1863); 6 × 3-inch Ordnance rifles (May 1864)
- Engagements: American Civil War; Tullahoma campaign (1863); Battle of Chickamauga (1863); Battle of Missionary Ridge (1863); Knoxville campaign (1863); Battle of Rocky Face Ridge (1864); Battle of Resaca (1864); Battle of Adairsville (1864); Battle of Pickett's Mill (1864); Battle of Kennesaw Mountain (1864); Battle of Peachtree Creek (1864); Battle of Atlanta (1864); Battle of Jonesboro (1864); Battle of Franklin (1864); Battle of Nashville (1864)

Commanders
- Notable commanders: Lyman Bridges

Bridges' Battery Illinois Light Artillery was an artillery battery from Illinois that served in the Union Army during the American Civil War. Organized on 17 June 1861 as Company G, 19th Illinois Infantry Regiment, it was detached as an independent artillery battery on 14 January 1863. The battery fought in the Tullahoma campaign, at the battles of Chickamauga and Missionary Ridge, and in the Knoxville campaign in 1863. Bridges' Battery participated in the Atlanta campaign in 1864, fighting at Rocky Face Ridge, Resaca, Adairsville, Pickett's Mill, Kennesaw Mountain, Peachtree Creek, Atlanta, and Jonesboro. The unit fought at Franklin and Nashville shortly before it was renamed Battery B, 1st Illinois Light Artillery Regiment on 21 December 1864. It spent the rest of the war with the Nashville garrison and was mustered out in July 1865.

== History ==
=== 1863 Formation ===
The unit which became Bridges' Battery Illinois Light Artillery mustered into Federal service as Company G, 19th Illinois Infantry Regiment on 17 June 1861. Company G shared in the experiences of the 19th Illinois Infantry until September 1862, when it was fitted out as an artillery battery at Nashville, Tennessee. The unit was at Nashville from 12 September through 7 November 1862, when it marched to Gallatin, Tennessee. On 20 November, the company turned in its artillery equipment and returned to Nashville. Company G marched from Nashville to join its parent regiment at Murfreesboro, Tennessee, on 2 January 1863. It is not clear whether it went into action at the Battle of Stones River on that date. On 14 January 1863, Company G was permanently detached as Bridges' Battery Illinois Light Artillery and equipped at Nashville. By 20 February, the new artillery battery returned to the Army of the Cumberland at Murfreesboro and was attached to the Pioneer Brigade. It remained at Murfreesboro until June 1863. At that time the battery was reassigned to the 1st Brigade, 2nd Division, XIV Corps. While assigned to the Pioneer brigade, the battery reported 2 officers and 116 enlisted men present for duty and 6 guns. There were 133 officers and men reported aggregate present and 159 aggregate present and absent.

Captain Lyman Bridges of Chicago assumed command of the battery. William Bishop of Springfield and Morris D. Temple of Chicago were first lieutenants, while Lyman A. White and Franklin Seborn of Chicago were second lieutenants. On 1 July 1863, White was promoted first lieutenant. The battery participated in the Tullahoma campaign from 23 June to 7 July 1863. When Bridges' Battery reported from Manchester, Tennessee, its armament consisted of two M1841 6-pounder field guns, two M1841 12-pounder howitzers, and two 3-inch Ordnance rifles. The unit reported having the following smoothbore ammunition: 195 round shot, 266 spherical case shot, and 122 canister shot for 6-pounder guns, and 50 common shell and 350 spherical case shot for 12-pounder howitzers. It also reported having 100 round shot, 250 spherical case shot, and 50 canister for 12-pounder field guns, but this may be an error. The battery also reported having the following 3-inch rifled ammunition: 105 bullet shell, 65 percussion shell, 250 fuse shell, and 84 canister shot.

=== 1863 Chickamauga ===
At the Battle of Chickamauga on 19–20 September 1863, Bridges' Battery was attached to John Beatty's 1st Brigade, James S. Negley's 2nd Division, in the XIV Corps under George Henry Thomas. By this date, the battery had been rearmed with two 12-pounder Napoleons and four 3-inch Ordnance rifles. On 20 September, Thomas, commanding the Union left wing, asked for Negley's division to fill a gap on his extreme left flank. There was some confusion and only John Beatty's brigade could be sent at first. When Beatty arrived at 8:00 am, Thomas directed him to form on the left of Absalom Baird's division. Beatty deployed his brigade across the Lafayette Road, facing north, on Baird's left, with Bridges' Battery near the road. Soon afterward, a staff officer directed Beatty to move his brigade 400 yd (366 m) north. Beatty argued against the move to no avail; the staff officer insisted that the order was imperative. Baird watched with dismay as his flank support marched away, just as a Confederate attack seemed imminent.

As Beatty's brigade moved north, it was struck by two and a half Confederate brigades. Captain Bridges split his battery into two 3-gun sections with Lieutenant Bishop in charge of the right section on the east side of the road and Bridges leading the left section on the west side. At first, Bridges' section moved north, but it soon returned to its original location. Bridges reported opening fire on Confederate infantry at 9:30 am with case shot at 400 yd (366 m) and canister as the range decreased. As Union infantry fled through the battery, Beatty ordered Bridges to retreat. By this time, so many horses and men were casualties, that two of the guns had to be abandoned. Bishop was killed while trying to save his guns from capture. Some men from the 104th Illinois Infantry Regiment helped save one of Bishop's guns but the other two were lost. Confederate Lieutenant Lot Young of the 4th Kentucky Infantry watched in astonishment as Captain Bridges rode his horse into full view and lifted his hat to his enemies. Despite being the target of 50 riflemen, Bridges trotted away unscathed. As Thomas, Beatty, and other officers tried to save the left from collapse, Bridges sent his four remaining guns back to Snodgrass Hill under Lieutenant Temple. Negley placed the battery facing southeast toward the Dyer field alongside Battery M, 1st Ohio Light Artillery. Later, Negley ordered all of his batteries off the field, though the battle still raged.

Bridges' Battery lost six killed, 20 wounded, and four missing out of 126 officers and men at Chickamauga. The battery also lost 46 horses, one Napoleon, one Ordnance rifle, three limbers, and one caisson. Bridges' Battery dragged four abandoned guns from other batteries off the field. In its 3rd Quarter 1863 report, Bridges' Battery reported having the following 12-pounder Napoleon ammunition: four solid shot, 148 common shell, 34 case shot, and no canister shot. For the 3-inch Ordnance rifles there were 130 percussion shell, 186 fuse shell, 163 bullet shell, and 66 canister shot. The battery's small arms included 10 Remington Army revolvers, 15 cavalry sabers, and five horse artillery sabers. After the death of Lieutenant Bishop, Seborn was promoted first lieutenant and William R. Bise of Canton, Missouri, was promoted second lieutenant.

=== 1863 Chattanooga ===
During the Chattanooga campaign, Bridges' Battery was attached to Thomas J. Wood's 3rd Division of Gordon Granger's IV Corps. After Wood's division captured Orchard Knob on 23 November 1863, General Thomas immediately ordered Bridges' Battery forward to occupy the seized hill. In the Battle of Missionary Ridge on 25 November, Ulysses S. Grant ordered Thomas to attack the Confederate rifle pits at the base of the ridge. Thomas relayed the order to Granger, who was totally absorbed in aiming the guns of Bridges' Battery. After Grant repeated the order, Granger came to his senses and instructed his division commanders Wood and Philip Sheridan to attack when a battery fired six shots in rapid succession. As noted on the historical marker at the Chickamauga and Chattanooga National Military Park, Bridges' Battery fired the six signal shots to begin the attack about 3:30 pm. The battery was armed with two 12-pounder Napoleons and four 3-inch Ordnance rifles. After the soldiers stepped off, the battery "continued a rapid and annoying fire over the heads of the assaulting line of Union troops till the ridge was carried". The marker states that the battery reported no casualties.

After pursuing as far as Graysville, Georgia, Bridges' Battery served in the Knoxville campaign. From 28 November to 8 December 1863, it marched to the relief of Knoxville. The battery participated in operations in East Tennessee through April 1864. This included a reconnaissance from Maryville, Tennessee, on 1–2 February. In its 4th Quarter 1863 report, Bridges' Battery had two 12-pounder Napoleons and six 3-inch Ordnance rifles. The unit reported having the following 12-pounder Napoleon ammunition: 32 common shell and 17 canister shot. The 3-inch Ordnance rifle ammunition included 240 percussion shell, 262 fuse shell, 240 case shot, and 160 canister shot.

=== 1864 Atlanta ===
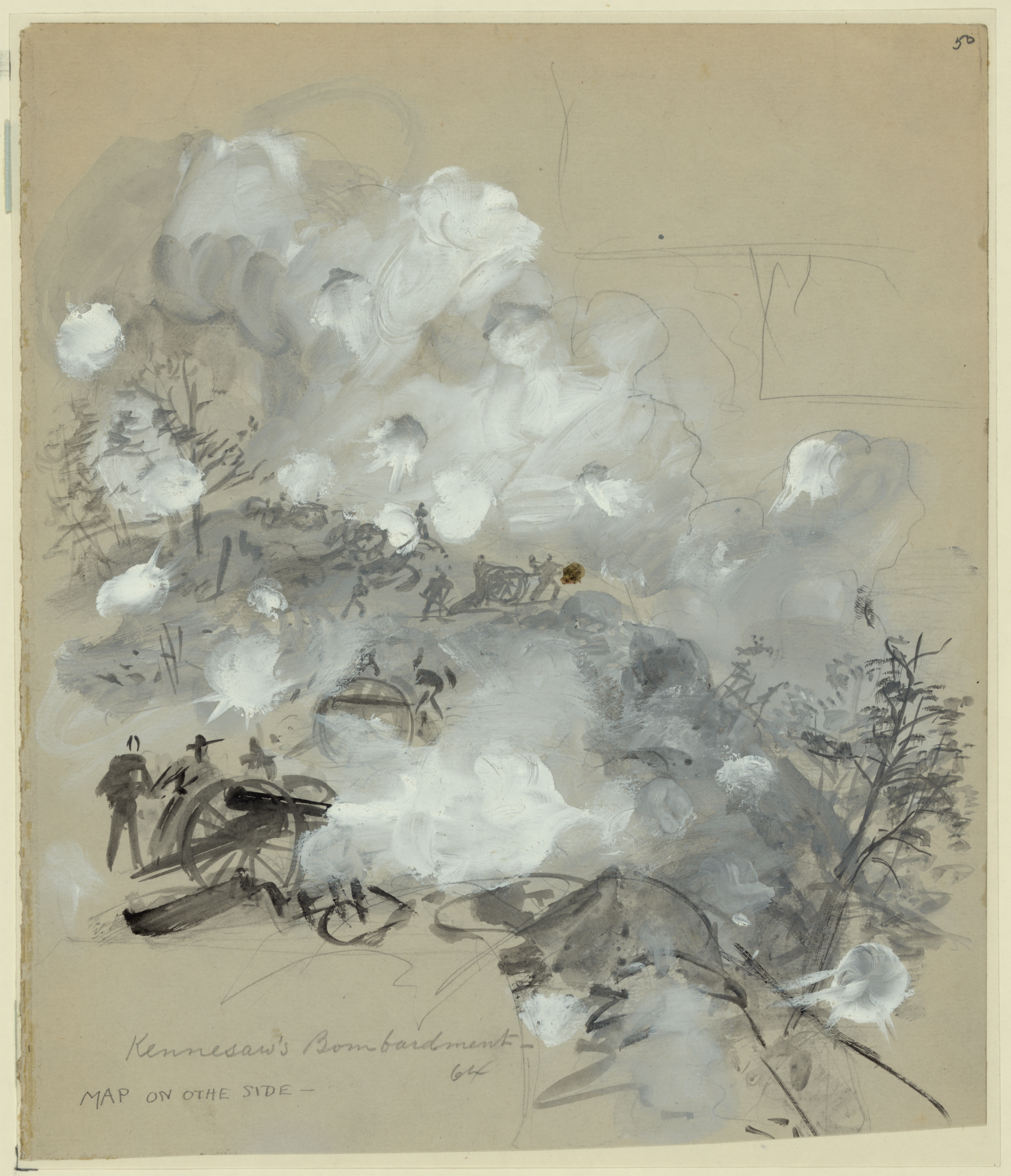
Wash drawing by Alfred Waud shows Union artillery firing near Kennesaw Mountain.

At the start of the Atlanta campaign, Bridges' Battery was assigned to Wood's 3rd Division in Oliver Otis Howard's IV Corps. In the report of Bridges' Battery at the end of the campaign, Lieutenant Lyman A. White noted that Bridges' Battery started the campaign on 5 May 1864 with six 3-inch Ordnance rifles under the command of Captain Bridges. The battery shelled the Confederate positions on 10 and 12 May during the Battle of Rocky Face Ridge. The battery was present but not engaged in the Battle of Resaca on 13 May. During the Battle of Adairsville the unit shelled the enemy at 5:00 pm on 17 May. At 6:00 pm on 18 May its raking fire helped disperse Confederate formations. On 22 May, General Howard appointed Captain Bridges the acting chief-of-artillery for IV Corps and Lieutenant Temple assumed command of Bridges' Battery.

On 27 May 1864, Bridges' Battery fought in the Battle of Pickett's Mill while emplaced in field works. That day and on 28–30 May, the battery engaged two Confederate batteries that were 1,800 yd (1,646 m) distant. During the bombardment, the field works were completely smashed and had to be rebuilt by the artillerists. One of the opposing batteries was silenced. During the four days of fighting, the battery lost five men wounded (two severely), four horses killed, and two caisson wheels damaged. On 8 June, two enlisted men were captured by Confederate cavalry while foraging. Also on 8 June, Lieutenants Temple and Bise and 28 soldiers were ordered to return to Chicago because their enlistments expired. Lieutenant White assumed command of the battery.

From 17 June to 3 July 1864, Bridges' Battery was continuously involved in the fighting leading up to and after the Battle of Kennesaw Mountain. The section led by Sergeant Luman C. Lawrence silenced a Confederate battery on 17–18 June. During an especially fierce bombardment on 21 June, Lieutenant Seborn and an enlisted man were wounded, and two horses killed and one wounded. On 22 June, one gun was disabled after being hit by a 12-pounder solid shot. On 6 July, fire from the battery prevented Confederates from removing a pontoon bridge spanning the Chattahoochee River. On 9 July an enlisted man was killed by a musket ball. The battery crossed the Chattahoochee with the IV Corps on 12 July. The unit took position on the north bank of Peachtree Creek on 19 July and the section led by Sergeant Clark E. Dodge received the compliments of General Thomas for its good shooting. The Battle of Peachtree Creek occurred on 20 July; on the following day the battery fired on the outer defenses of Atlanta and drove off some enemy skirmishers.

During the Battle of Atlanta on 22 July 1864, Bridges' Battery unlimbered north-northeast of Atlanta and began shelling the Confederate defenses at 3:00 pm. Starting at 6:00 pm on 23 July and continuing for 26 hours, the battery bombarded the Atlanta defenses. For 12 hours, one gun was fired every three minutes, while the firing interval was increased to every five minutes for the next 14 hours. The guns fired almost every day until 12 August when the battery moved to a new position. From then until 25 August, firing was occasional. On 2 August Sergeants Dodge and Lawrence were both promoted to second lieutenant. The unit participated in the flank march from 25–30 August, ending in the Battle of Jonesborough on 1 September. During the campaign, the battery sustained personnel losses of two killed, six wounded, and four captured. Captain Bridges submitted a report on 9 September 1864 in his capacity as IV Corps chief-of-artillery. He listed the armament of Bridges' Battery as five 3-inch Ordnance rifles and noted that the battery expended 130 solid shot, 1,815 percussion shell, 1,212 fuse shell, 2,092 case shot, and 14 canister shot in the campaign.

=== 1864 Franklin ===
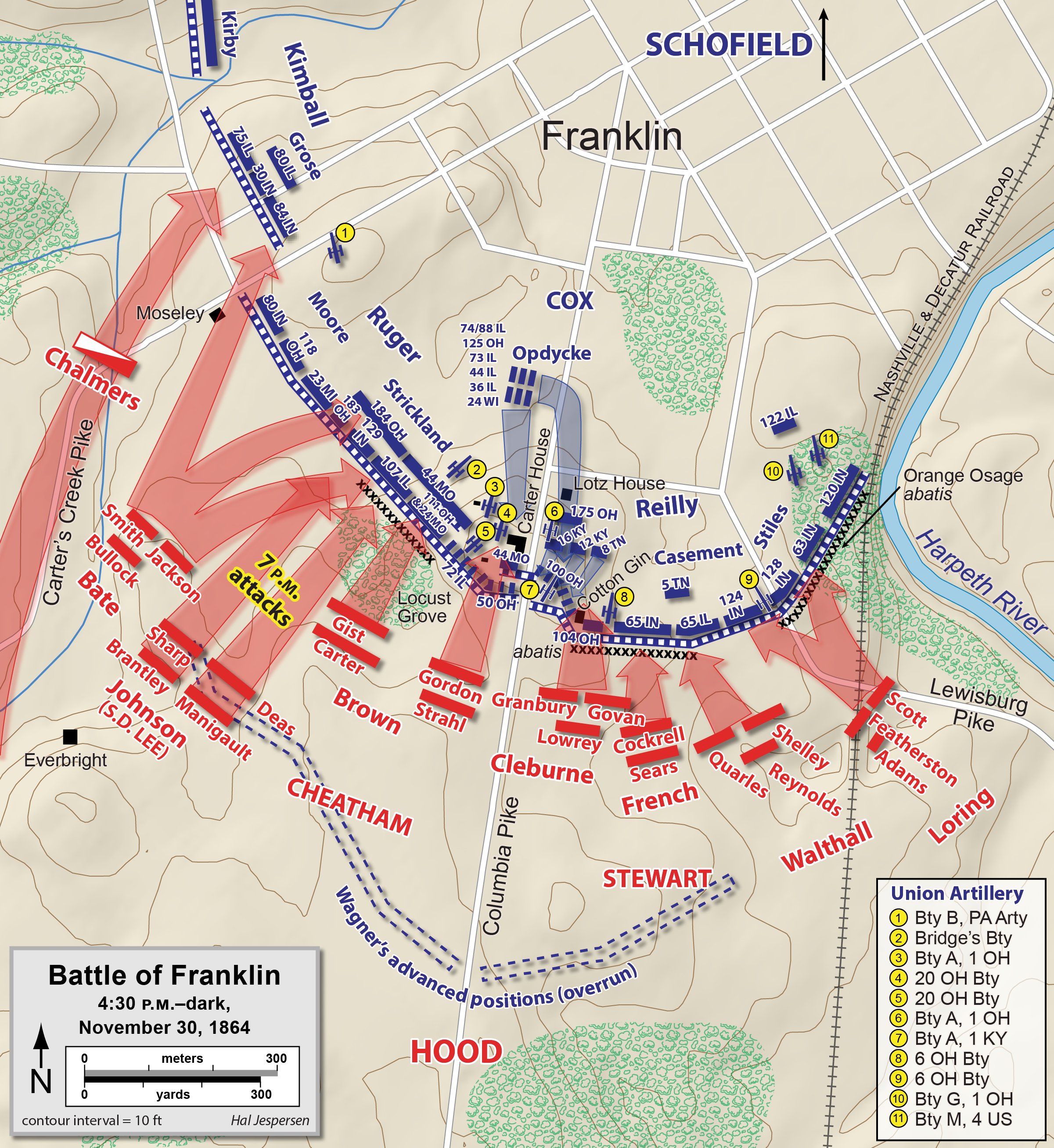
Bridges' Battery is shown near Strickland's brigade in this Battle of Franklin map.

Bridges' Battery participated in operations against John Bell Hood's Confederate army in northern Georgia from 29 September to 3 November 1864. The battery took part in the Franklin–Nashville Campaign starting on 24 November. In the Battle of Franklin on 30 November, Bridges' Battery was commanded by Lieutenant White and formed part of the IV Corps artillery reserve under Captain Bridges. The IV Corps was led by David S. Stanley. At first, the battery was placed in reserve of the center near the Columbia Pike. The center was threatened when Confederate attackers closely followed routed Union soldiers from George D. Wagner's division and seized the outer breastworks. Bridges' Battery and two others briefly held off the attackers until Emerson Opdycke's brigade plugged the gap. At first, Bridges' Battery tried to unlimber near the Carter house garden, but it quickly shifted position to the northwest of the Carter house. In this location, its guns helped the 111th Ohio Infantry defend its earthworks. Bridges' Battery and 1st Kentucky Battery were among the last artillery units to pull out, around midnight. After the battle, Captain Bridges reported that the battery sustained casualties of seven men wounded. Its four guns fired the following 3-inch ammunition: 113 percussion shell, 26 fuse shell, 171 case shot, and no canister shot.

During the Battle of Nashville on 15–16 December 1864, Bridges' Battery led by Lieutenant White was assigned to the Post of Nashville under John F. Miller. No casualties were reported. On 21 December 1864, Bridges' Battery was renamed Battery B, 1st Illinois Light Artillery Regiment. The battery spent the rest of the war with the Nashville garrison and mustered out of service on 6 July 1865. During its existence, Bridges' Battery suffered casualties of two officers and seven enlisted men killed, while 20 enlisted men died of disease. In 1869–1870, a monument to Bridges' Battery was erected at Rosehill Cemetery in Chicago and 26 soldiers were buried there.

== See also ==
- List of Illinois Civil War units
