= Benjamin Berl Lipsner =

American military officer (1887–1971)

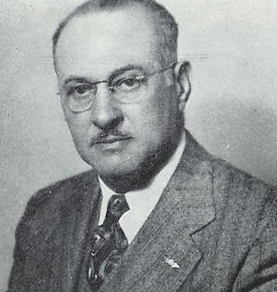
- Lipsner (c. 1940)

Personal details
- Born: September 15, 1887 Chicago, Illinois, U.S.
- Died: December 24, 1971 (aged 84) Chicago, Illinois, U.S.
- Resting place: Rosehill Cemetery; Chicago, Illinois, U.S.
- Spouse: Rose E.
- Children: 4
- Education: Armour Institute

Benjamin Berl Lipsner (September 15, 1887 – December 24, 1971) was an American military officer and civil servant. He served as the first supervisor of the Post Office Department's airmail service from September to December 1918. He was known as the "father of commercial aviation".

== Early life ==
Benjamin Berl Lipsner was born on September 15, 1887, in Chicago, Illinois. He graduated from Armour Institute in Chicago with a degree in mechanical engineering.

== Career ==
During World War I, Lipsner served as a captain of the United States Army Signal Corps's Air Service Production. He supervised the mechanical upkeep of the planes used for airmail service. He retired from the Army in August 1918 when the airmail service transferred to the Post Office Department. Lipsner then served as the first supervisor of the Post Office Department's airmail service starting on August 12, 1918. The service initially operated from New York to Washington, D.C. During his tenure as superintendent, there was a New York to Chicago pathfinding mission in September 1918 for the airmail service. The test flights did not immediately lead to an extension of service to Chicago, but brought public support to the new civilian airmail service. He resigned from his position on December 5, 1918, following conflict with Second Assistant Postmaster General Otto Praeger about hiring and the purchase of new equipment. In Lipsner's resignation letter, which was printed in newspapers throughout the country, he was critical of the Post Office Department.

Lipsner joined the private aviation industry in December 1918. He also served as a consultant to oil companies and airlines.

Lipsner wrote The Airmail, Jennies to Jets in 1951 with Len Hilts.

== Personal life ==
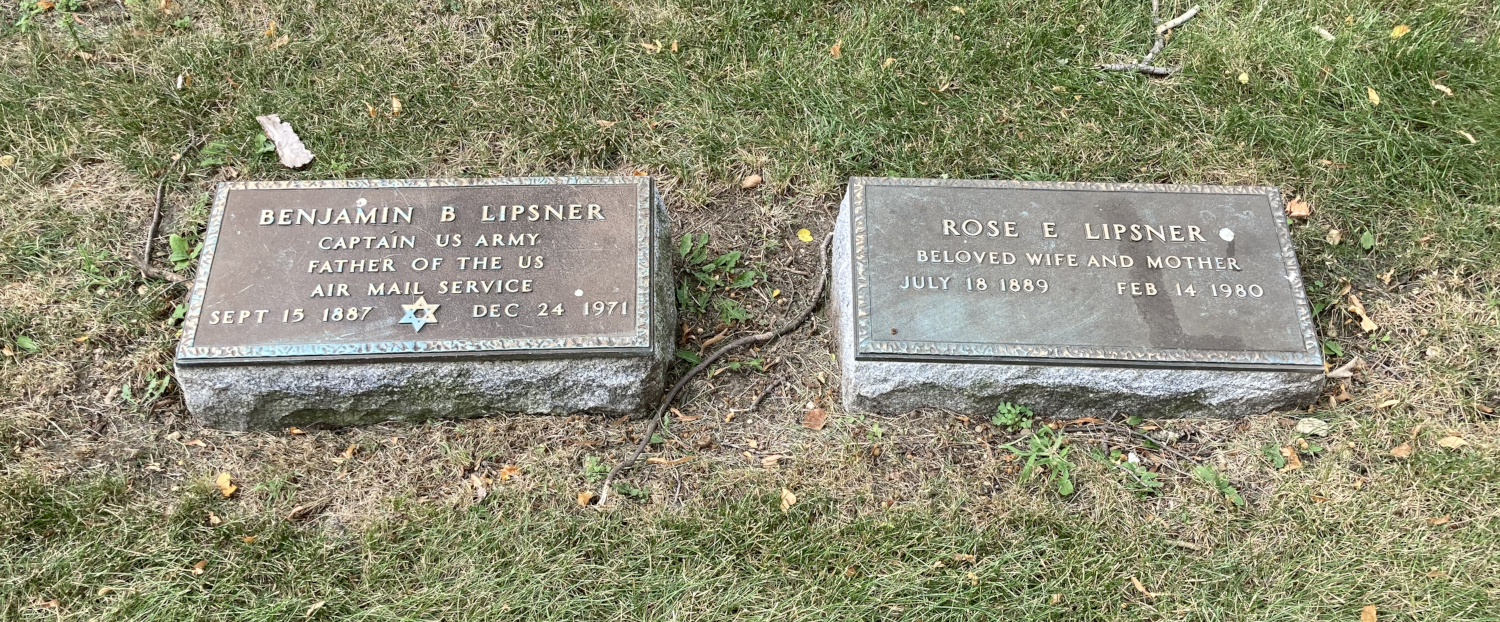
Lipsner's grave at Rosehill Cemetery, Chicago

Lipsner married Rose E. They had two sons and two daughters, Milton A., Jerome S., Charlotte and Shirley. Lipsner lived at 5650 North Sheridan Road in Chicago.

Lipsner died on December 24, 1971, at the Veterans Affairs Research Hospital in Chicago. He was buried at Rosehill Cemetery in Chicago.

== Legacy ==
Lipsner was known as the "father of commercial aviation".

In 1982, Lipsner's estate donated to the Smithsonian Institution over 500 aero philatelic covers, twelve scrapbooks and biographical materials. These donations are now in the possession of the National Postal Museum.
