= John W. Pollard =

John William Pollard (c. 1846 – 1932), born in Virginia into a family of free black farmers while the slave trade was still thriving in the South, was among the first group of African Americans to join the Union Army in 1862, serving in a colored unit during the American Civil War. He later worked as a barber and eventually settled with his wife Catherine Amanda Hughes in Chicago, where his family included five boys and three girls who made pioneering achievements in sports, music, film, and community service. Pollard lived at 1928 Lunt and had his barber shop at 7017 North Ravenswood. Several family members are buried at Rosehill Cemetery.

== Family history ==
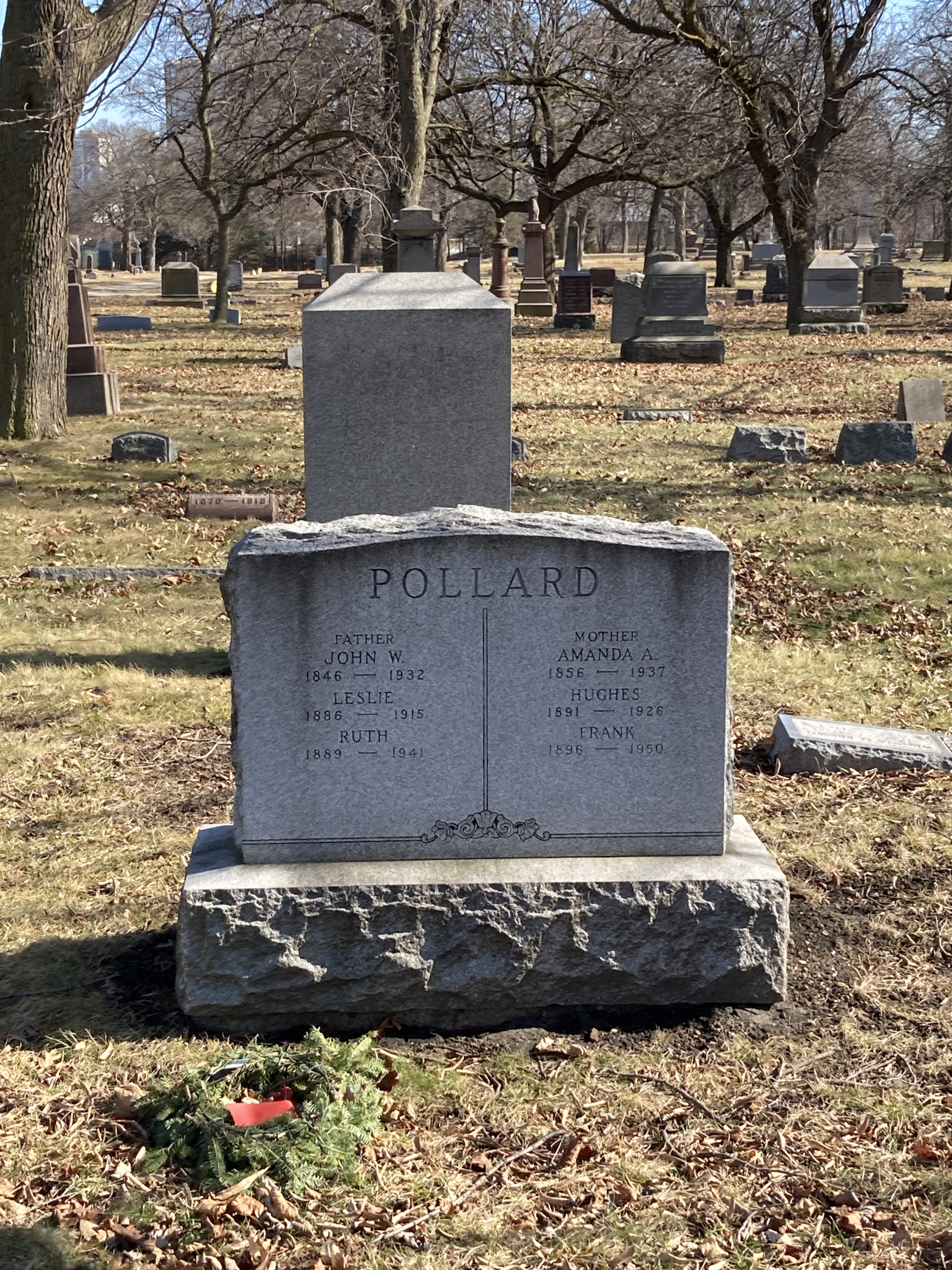
Pollard's grave at Rosehill Cemetery

Pollard's family was emancipated near the end of the American Revolution and settled in a community of freedmen in Northern Virginia. His father died in a lumbering accident when Pollard was eight; his mother, fearing that Pollard and his sister would be kidnapped and sold, sent them to be raised and educated in Kansas Territory.

At the age of 16 in 1862, using the name Jackson Ridgway, Pollard joined the Union Army to serve in the Civil War, during which he became regimental boxing champion, returning to Kansas after service. His determination to further his education was frustrated when he contracted smallpox on his way to Oberlin College, where he planned to study law. When he recovered, he became a barber in Mexico, Missouri, where he met his future wife Catherine "Amanda" Hughes (1856–1937). She worked as a seamstress and was of mixed heritage. They married and had their first three children, before moving to Chicago and settling in the Rogers Park neighborhood, an area of mostly white German immigrants, where educational opportunities were better and they had a further five children.

Pollard's eldest son Luther Jay Pollard was a star athlete who entered the advertising business after being denied entry into the segregated world of professional sports. He fronted Ebony Film Corporation. Another of his sons, Leslie Pollard, was an accomplished athlete in high school, played football for Dartmouth College, and coached at Lincoln University in Oxford, Pennsylvania, from about 1910 until 1915, when he died of accidental gas asphyxiation in an apartment. Hughes Pollard (January 5, 1892–1926) was an accomplished high school athlete and trap drummer with The Melody Four. He was injured in a gas attack while serving with the French army during World War I, and died several years later from complications. College and Professional Football Hall of Famer Fritz Pollard (born January 27, 1894) was his youngest son. According to a 1970 interview Fritz gave at Brown University, his sisters Ruth, Artemesia, and Naomi also had successful athletic and academic careers. Fritz Pollard Jr. was a hurdler who won an Olympic bronze medal.
