= Henry W. Childs =

"American politician (1848 – 1906)"

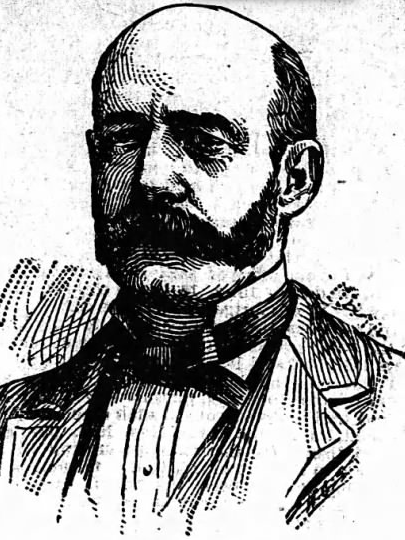
- Childs c.1894

9th Minnesota Attorney General
- In office January 2, 1893 – January 2, 1899
- Governor: Knute Nelson; David Marston Clough
- Preceded by: Moses E. Clapp
- Succeeded by: Wallace B. Douglas

Personal details
- Born: Henry Warren Childs; November 24, 1848 Clay, New York, U.S.
- Died: August 30, 1906 (aged 57) Merriam Park; Saint Paul, Minnesota, U.S.
- Resting place: Oakland Cemetery; Saint Paul, Minnesota, U.S.
- Nickname: H. W. Childs

Henry Warren Childs (November 24, 1848 - August 30, 1906), sometimes written as H. W. Childs, was an American educator, lawyer, politician, and railroad worker who served as the ninth Minnesota Attorney General from 1893 to 1899.

== Early life ==
Henry Warren Childs was born on November 24, 1848 in Clay, New York to parents Philander Childs and Mary Ann Preston. Childs grew up as a farmer and attended common school while growing up in New York. Childs later attended coursework at Falley Seminary and at Cazenovia College (at the time called the Central Conference Seminary). Following his term at Cazenovia College, Childs worked as a teacher for two years at the Liverpool Academy in Liverpool, New York before continuing studies in Syracuse, New York. Not willing to pursue a career in teaching, Childs turned to the field of law and studied law under attorneys Tousley & Bailey, later opening a law office in Syracuse.

== State Prosecutor ==
Childs first moved to Minnesota in 1883 and settled in Fergus Falls, Minnesota in Otter Tail County, Minnesota where he continued to practice law. Childs at the time was most notably known for his role as a state prosecutor in the trial of the Redwood Falls murder in 1888 where he represented the state of Minnesota during the prosecution of Clifton Holden for the murder of his cousin Frank Dodge in Redwood Falls, Minnesota. Childs later assisted in a similar prosecution of William Rose in 1891 for a similar murder which ultimately led to the execution of Rose.

== Political career ==
In January 1887 Childs was appointed to the position of Assistant Attorney General under Moses E. Clapp, who he worked for the entirety of his term as Minnesota Attorney General from 1887 to 1893.

Beginning in January 1892 Childs ran for the office of Minnesota Attorney General during the 1892 Minnesota Attorney General election against John L. MacDonald, John Nethaway, and Robert Taylor. Childs won the election with 43.31% of the vote. Childs would go on to win the 1894 Minnesota Attorney General election and the 1896 Minnesota Attorney General election and secure the position of Minnesota Attorney General from 1893 to 1899. Childs was eventually succeeded as Minnesota Attorney General by Wallace B. Douglas.

== Later life ==
Childs was later a foundational figured behind the merging of the Great Northern Railway and the Northern Pacific Railway companies under James J. Hill. Childs died on August 30, 1906 at the age of 57 from appendicitis. He is buried at Oakland Cemetery in Saint Paul.

== Personal life ==
Childs was married to Alberta A. Hakes in January 1883, together they had one child, James Alanson Childs.
