= Chinese Blackjack =

East Asian card game

Chinese Blackjack is also known as 21-point, ban-luck (Hokkien), ban-nag (Cantonese), and xì dách (Vietnamese). The game is played in South East Asia and resembles conventional Blackjack. In Malaysia, this variant is known as Kampung (Village) Blackjack to differentiate it from the standard Casino Blackjack, and it grew from the game played in the old days in villages.

Traditionally, most casual gamblers gamble during the Chinese New Year; it is believed the new year brings in fresh new luck. Chinese Blackjack is one of the most popular games played during the new year. The game is played extensively in Singapore as well.

The game uses one or two 52-card deck(s) and is playable by any number of players. One is the dealer, or they may take turns dealing.

The game probably evolved from the fact that amongst friends, it is hard to host a casino rules blackjack game that needs a dealer who plays differently from the players. In casino rules, the cards are opened, and the dealer must play at least until 17 points but must stand once reached, while the players have no limits. This is complicated for a home friendly game, and it appears that the odds are stacked against the dealer. So most friends don't volunteer to be the dealer.

A unique feature is that the dealer is allowed to selectively reveal some players' hands, settle bets with them and then hit again and reveal other players' hands. Another unique feature is a special status given to owning 5 cards unbusted.

Although Chinese Blackjack has some standard rules, unusual house rules are common.

== Kampung Blackjack ==
In Malaysian kampung blackjack, which is likely to be a derivative of the original Chinese Blackjack, ('Kampung' means village in Malay) the following rules apply:

- All hands including the dealer must reach at least 15 points (reached 'license' or 'passport'), or a penalty applies (usually the offender has to pay all players).
- The maximum number of cards to be drawn is 5 only.
- A burn rule may apply to make things more exciting. Players receiving the initial 2 cards of 15 points may get a new lease of luck by drawing a fresh set of cards by doubling up their original bet. It gets interesting when the dealer does the burn, as all players must then double up as well. Players may choose not to 'burn' with the dealer by forfeiting the bet.
- A Blackjack is one that has 21 points achieved by a ten/picture card + an ace, and usually is paid as 1:2.
- In addition, other special winning conditions apply:
  - Any combination to 21 points (usually paid out as 1:2), drawn to a maximum of 5 cards.
  - Surviving unbusted at 5 cards (usually 1:2 depending on house rules).
  - Unbusted at 5 cards AND 21 (usually 1:3 depending on house rules).
  - Triple 7 21 (usually a big payout from 1:5 to 1:21, depending on house rules).
- Unlike Chinese Blackjack described below, pairs has no winning privileges.
- Players to reveal busted cards (depending on house rules)
- The dealer's turn is always last. They may choose selectively open the hands of the players, and make an immediate payout/collect according to the points they have at hand. After that, they may continue to hit himself to chance if they can get higher points, or bust. This feature gives a perception of 'another lifeline' as the dealer with a bad card like 16 or 17 points can eliminate players with 3 or 4 cards on the likelihood that they have busted, before attempting another attempt to beat players with 2 cards which are likely to be good cards (18 to 21).

Apart from the above, the game is similar to the Chinese Blackjack described below.

== Gameplay ==
Chinese Blackjack may be played with as many players as possible, and with as many decks as the players wish to incorporate. One player may serve as a dedicated dealer, or the players may take turns being the dealer, in casual game settings.

Although most households may have their own set of house rules, some rules are standardized, such as those related to gameplay and payouts.

=== Before Dealing ===
Players place their bets. Players may bet as much as they wish, but they are not allowed to change their bets once the cards have been dealt. They may only change their bets in between hands.

=== Dealing ===
After the dealer shuffles the cards, one player may cut the deck, to reduce the risk of the dealer cheating. The dealer then deals two cards to each player face-down. They may choose to deal in either direction (clockwise or counter-clockwise), and may choose to deal themselves first or last. Once all cards have been dealt, each player and the dealer checks for special hands which grant advantages, such as immediate payout.

If a player has a special hand which entitles them to immediate payout, they must reveal their hands. The dealer then pays them bonuses on top of their wager, and they do not participate further in the current hand.

If the dealer has a special hand which entitles them to immediate payout, the round ends. All players lose their bets to the dealer, plus any bonuses the dealer is entitled to based on their winning hand.

In a typical round, play then begins with the first player who received cards, or the first player in turn order who does not have a special winning hand. The dealer acts last in the round.

=== Player's Turns ===
On the players' turns, they may perform one of the following actions:

- Hitting (if their point total < 16). The turn player receives one more card from the dealer. Players may hit up to three times on their turn, for a maximum of five cards in their hand.
- Standing (if their point total ≥ 16). The turn player may choose not to receive any more cards, ending their turn.

=== Dealer's Turn ===
Once all players in the current hand have acted, the dealer takes their turn. They may perform one of the following actions:

- Hitting (if their point total < 16). The dealer takes one more card from the top of the deck.
- Standing (if their point total ≥ 16). The dealer chooses not to take a card from the top of the deck.
- Revealing. The dealer may choose a player to reveal their hand. The player whose cards are revealed may win or lose their bet against the dealer.

Unlike in traditional blackjack, the dealer may select certain players to reveal their hands before revealing their own. The dealer may only begin revealing cards once they have reached at least 16 points. They may also hit again after revealing other players' hands, in the hope of strengthening their own. The round ends when all players' hands have been revealed by the dealer, or if the dealer busts.

Once the round ends, payments are settled. Players may win (if their hand beats the dealers), lose (if the dealer's hand beats theirs), or tie (if the player's hand is equally strong as the dealer's, or if both the player and dealer bust).

=== Points and Card Values ===
Each card has a fixed value, with the exception of the ace. The value of the ace depends on the number of cards in a player's hand. Suits are not considered when calculating the strength of a hand.

- Face cards (King, Queen, Jack) - 10 points
- All other cards besides face cards and Aces - face value
- Ace (with two cards on hand) - 1, 10, or 11 points
- Ace (with three cards on hand) - 1 or 10 points
- Ace (with more than three cards on hand) - 1 point

=== Special Winning Hands ===
At the start of each round, each player and the dealer checks their hand for special hands which grant them advantages or allow them to engage in special actions. If so, players may reveal their hands immediately. As the round progresses, players may also have to hit multiple times (up to five cards on hand). This is also a special hand, which must be revealed immediately.

==== Ban-Ban ====
A ban-ban is a pair of aces (A-A) as a player's starting hand.

If a player has a ban-ban, they win their bet against the dealer, 3 to 1. If the dealer also has a ban-ban, the player ties with the dealer, and they do not receive any payment.

If the dealer has a ban-ban, they win against all other players who do not have a ban-ban. All losing players must pay the dealer, 3 to 1.

==== Ban-Luck ====
A ban-luck is an ace and a face card or 10 (A-10, A-J, A-Q, or A-K), as a player's starting hand.

If a player has a ban-luck, they win their bet against the dealer, 2 to 1. If the dealer also has a ban-luck, the player ties with the dealer, and they do not receive any payment.

If the dealer has a ban-luck, they win against all other players who do not have a ban-luck. All losing players must pay the dealer, 2 to 1.

==== 15 Points ====
This rule only applies to the dealer. If the dealer receives 15 points in their opening hand, they may choose not to proceed with the current round. If the dealer chooses not to proceed, the round ends, and all the cards are collected, shuffled, and re-dealt, beginning a new round.

Any special winning hands (such as ban-ban or ban-luck) are voided if the dealer has 15 points and chooses to reset the game.

==== Triple 7s ====
If a player hits on a pair of sevens, and receives a third 7, they win against the dealer. They may be entitled to a special bonus payout predetermined by house rules. Most households have the player winning their bet, 7 to 1.

If the dealer hits on a pair of sevens and receives a third 7, they win against all other players, and may also be entitled to a special bonus payout from all other players.

==== 5-Dragon ====
This refers to a player who already has four cards on hand, and chooses to hit for a fifth and final card. They must reveal their current hand before receiving their fifth card.

If the turn player is under 21 points after receiving their fifth card, they win against the dealer, 2 to 1. If the turn player busts after receiving their fifth card, they lose against the dealer, 2 to 1.

This rule also affects the dealer as follows.

If the dealer is under 21 points after receiving their fifth card, they win against all other players, 2 to 1. If the dealer busts after receiving their fifth card, they lose against all other players who have not busted, 2 to 1.
