= 1892 Minnesota Attorney General election =

- November 8, 1892
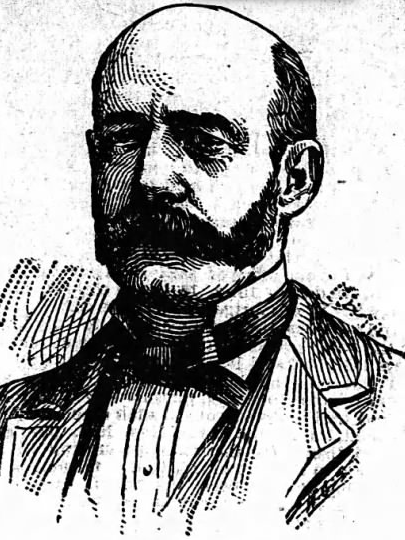

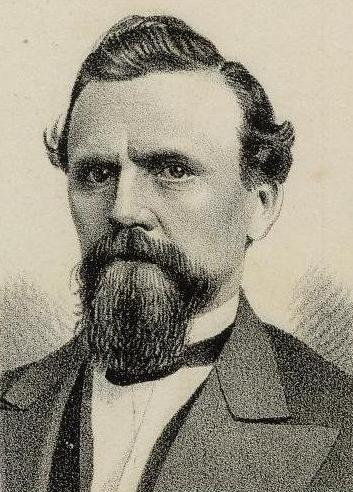

Nominee	Henry W. Childs	John Nethaway
Party	Republican	Democratic
Popular vote	108,785	90,690
Percentage	43.31%	36.11%
Nominee	John L. MacDonald	Robert Taylor
Party	Populist	Prohibition
Popular vote	37,702	14,000
Percentage	15.01%	5.57%
Attorney General before election
Moses E. Clapp
Republican
Elected Attorney General
Henry W. Childs
Republican

The 1892 Minnesota Attorney General election was held on Tuesday November 8, to elect the next attorney general of Minnesota. Republican nominee Henry W. Childs defeated Democratic nominee John Nethaway. People's Party nominee and formerUnited States Representative from Minnesota's 3rd congressional district. John L. MacDonald and Prohibition nominee Robert Taylor.

== General election ==
On election day, November 8, 1892, Republican nominee Henry W. Childs won the election by a margin of 18,095 votes against his foremost opponent Democratic nominee John Nethaway, thereby retaining Republican control over the office of attorney general. Childs was sworn in as the 9th attorney general of Minnesota on January 4, 1893.

=== Results ===
Minnesota Attorney General election, 1892
Party	Candidate	Votes	%
Republican	Henry W. Childs	108,785	43.31
Democratic	John Nethaway	90,690	36.11
Populist	John L. MacDonald	37,702	15.01
Prohibition	Robert Taylor	14,000	5.57
Total votes		251,177	100.00
Republican hold			
