= Tighe =

Tighe may refer to:

- Tighe (surname)
- Anglicization of Tadhg, a given name

== People with the given name ==
- Tighe Dombrowski (born 1982), American soccer player
- Tighe Scott (born 1949), American racecar driver
