= Hiram F. Stevens =

American politician

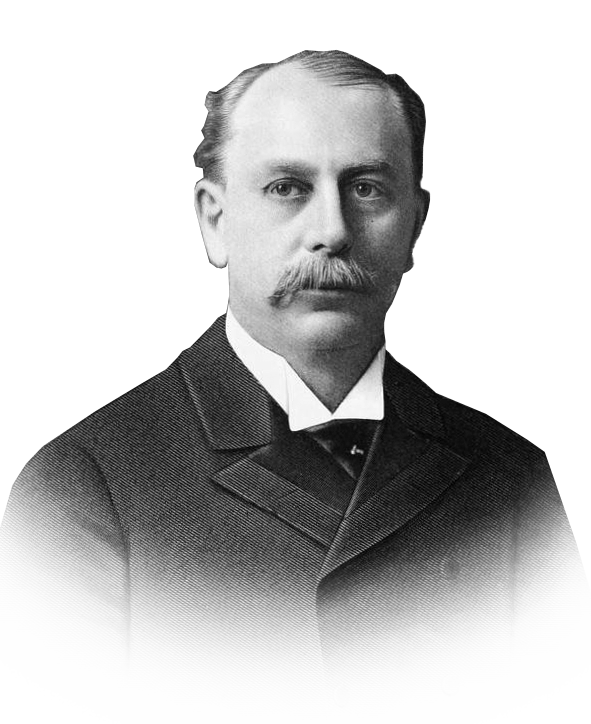

Personal details
- Born: Hiram Fairchild Stevens; September 11, 1852 St. Albans, Vermont, US
- Died: March 9, 1904 (aged 51) Saint Paul, Minnesota, US
- Education: University of Vermont; Columbia Law School
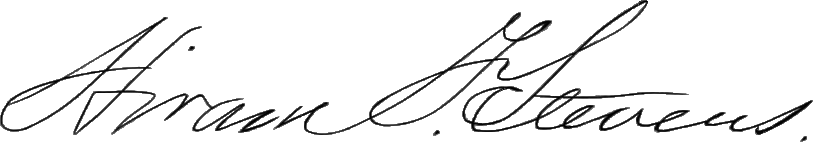
- Signature

Hiram Fairchild Stevens (September 11, 1852 – March 9, 1904) was an American lawyer, politician, and academic from Minnesota. He was one of the five co-founders of William Mitchell College of Law and a charter member of the American Bar Association.

== Early life and education ==
Stevens was born in St. Albans, Vermont to a family with deep ties to the state. His great-grandfather Stephen Fairchild had fought with the Vermont Militia during the American Revolutionary War. His father, also Hiram Fairchild Stevens, was a well-regarded doctor who had served as a state legislator and president of the Vermont State Medical Society. When the elder Stevens died prematurely from an illness contracted during his service with the Union Army in the U.S. Civil War, the family's loss of income forced the son to work to support his mother and three siblings. Despite the hardship, Stevens eventually graduated from the University of Vermont in 1872, and then Columbia Law School in 1874. During that time he also read law with former Judge John K. Porter of the New York Court of Appeals in the offices of Porter, Lowrey, Soren and Stone.

== Career ==
Stevens was admitted to the Vermont bar and practiced there for five years before moving to St. Paul, Minnesota. Upon his arrival, he associated with two other attorneys in the firm of Warner, Stevens, & Lawrence. He withdrew from the firm in 1886 to become general counsel for the St. Paul Estate Title Insurance Company. He also taught property law at the University of Minnesota Law School from 1892 to 1900. Stevens argued at least three cases before the U.S. Supreme Court: Northern Pacific Railway v. Smith, 171 U.S. 260 (1898), Scott v. DeWeese, 181 U.S. 202 (1901), and Gertgens v. O'Connor, 191 U.S. 237 (1903).

Throughout his life, Stevens was extremely active in public affairs. He was not only a charter member of the American Bar Association (1878) and a long-serving member of its General Council, but also a charter member of the Vermont State Bar Association (1878) and the Minnesota State Bar Association (1883). In 1901, he was elected president of the latter after it had been reestablished. Politically, Stevens served in the Minnesota House of Representatives from 1889 to 1891, and then in the Minnesota Senate from 1891 to 1899. He was a Republican.

In 1900, along with Ambrose Tighe, Moses Clapp, Thomas D. O'Brien and Clarence Halbert, Stevens founded the St. Paul College of Law, the first predecessor of William Mitchell College of Law. The group had asked former Justice William B. Mitchell of the Minnesota Supreme Court to become the first Dean of the school, but the judge died from a sudden stroke before assuming office and Stevens took his place.

Despite their educational partnership, Stevens had a publicized falling-out with Clapp after the latter had been elected to the U.S. Senate. Clapp categorically refused to consider him when Stevens' name was bruited as a potential nominee to the new seat on the U.S. District Court for the District of Minnesota. Because he and many others in the Minnesota legal community thought the move unjustified, Stevens retaliated by openly discussing a challenge to Clapp for his Senate seat in the 1904 elections. Stevens died in Saint Paul on March 9 of that year, before he could officially declare his candidacy.
