= Tighe (surname) =

Tighe (/taɪ/) is an Irish surname, derived from the Old Gaelic Mac Tighe, which originated in Galway, or O Taidhg. Notable persons with that name include:

- Ambrose Tighe (1859–1928), American lawyer, politician, and academic
- Andrew Tighe (born 1955), Australian actor
- Brad Tighe (born 1984), Australian rugby league player
- Charles Tighe, (1927–2004), American lawyer and politician
- Eugene F. Tighe (1921–1994), American military officer
- Jack Tighe (1913–2002), American baseball manager
- James Tighe (born 1982), British wrestler
- Jan E. Tighe (born 1962), American military officer
- Joan Tighe (1922–2014), Irish journalist and historian
- Karen Tighe, Australian sports presenter
- Kevin Tighe (born 1944), American actor
- Mary Tighe (1772–1810), Irish poet
- Paul Tighe (born 1958), Irish Roman Catholic bishop
- Richard Lodge Tighe (1902-1938), American politician
- Robert Tighe (died 1620), English cleric and linguist
- Tommy Tighe, American sports radio broadcaster
