= Youngdahl =

Youngdahl is a surname. Notable people with the surname include:

- Luther Youngdahl (1896–1978), Governor of Minnesota and United States District Judge
- Oscar Youngdahl (1893–1946), American lawyer and politician, brother of Luther
