= Thomas D. O'Brien =

American judge

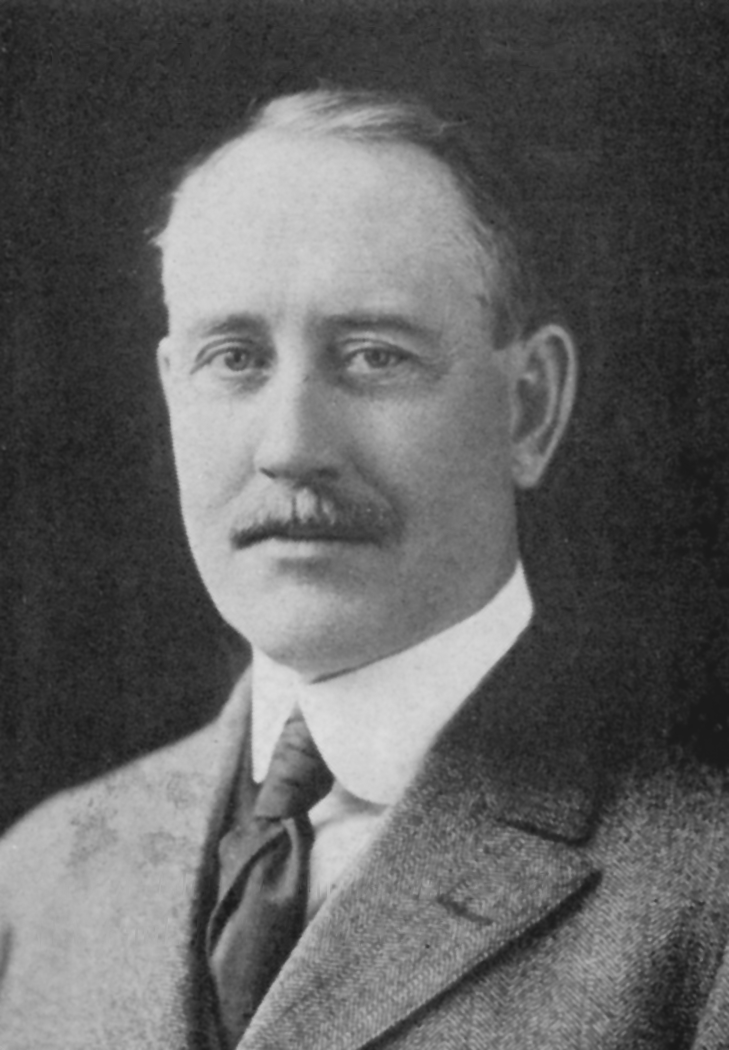
Thomas D. O'Brien

Thomas Dillon O'Brien (February 14, 1859 – September 3, 1935) was an American lawyer, judge, and academic from Minnesota. He was one of the five co-founders of William Mitchell College of Law and a justice of the Minnesota Supreme Court.

== Biography ==
O'Brien was born in the Wisconsin town of La Pointe, on Madeline Island on February 14, 1859. At the age of four, he and his family moved to St. Paul, Minnesota. He read law with a local practitioner, and admitted to the Minnesota bar in 1880. His legal career followed as the Clerk of St. Paul's Municipal Court. In 1885, he was appointed Assistant City Attorney. In 1891, he successful sought out election as Ramsey County Attorney, serving one term.

In 1900, the predecessor to the St. Paul College of Law, William Mitchell College of Law, was established with: Hiram F. Stevens, Ambrose Tighe, Moses Clapp, and Clarence Halbert. He taught there for much of that decade.

From 1905 to 1907, O'Brien served as the state Insurance Commissioner. In September 1909, Governor John Albert Johnson appointed him to be an associate justice of the Minnesota Supreme Court. O'Brien left the court in 1911 and returned to private practice. He later served as the dean of the St. Thomas College of Law, until its dissolution in 1933.

He died in St. Paul on September 3, 1935, and was interred at Calvary Cemetery.
