= Henry Poehler =

American politician (1833–1912)

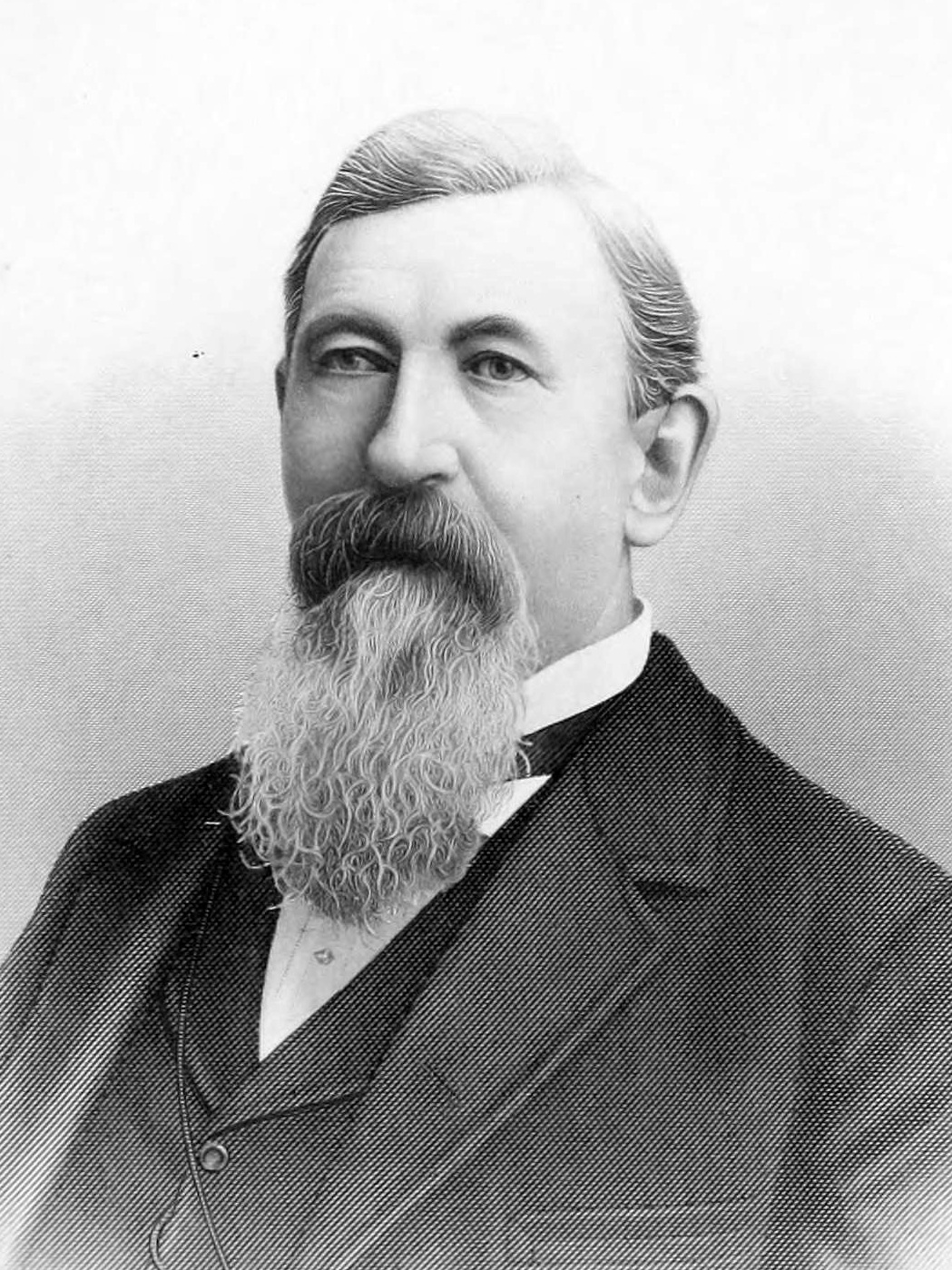
- Poehler in 1895

Member of the U.S. House of Representatives from Minnesota's 2nd district
- In office March 4, 1879 – March 3, 1881
- Preceded by: Horace B. Strait
- Succeeded by: Horace B. Strait

Personal details
- Born: August 22, 1833 Hiddesen, Lippe-Detmold, Germany
- Died: July 18, 1912 (aged 78) Henderson, Minnesota, U.S.
- Party: Democratic
- Profession: Politician

Henry Poehler (August 22, 1833 – July 18, 1912) was a U.S. representative from Minnesota. Born in Hiddesen, Lippe-Detmold, Germany (now a part of Detmold), he attended his father’s academy and immigrated to the United States in April 1848, settling in Burlington, Iowa, where he attended the public schools. He moved to St. Paul, Minnesota, in 1853 and later on to Henderson, Sibley County, Minnesota, in 1854. He engaged in general merchandising and as a grain merchant and was appointed postmaster at Henderson, Minnesota on February 25, 1856, serving until April 12, 1861. He served in the state house of representatives in 1857, 1858, and 1865, and served as county commissioner of Sibley County and chairman of the board from January 1865 to January 1868. He was member of the state senate in 1872 and 1873 and again in 1876 and 1877. He was elected as a Democrat to the Forty-sixth Congress, but was an unsuccessful candidate for reelection in 1880 to the Forty-seventh Congress and an unsuccessful candidate for Minnesota State Treasurer. He served as mayor of Henderson for several terms, later on moving to Minneapolis in 1889 and engaged in the general merchandise and grain business. He moved again to Los Angeles, California, in 1895. He died in Henderson, Minnesota, while on a visit to his sister. Interment in Brown Cemetery.

U.S. House of Representatives
Preceded by Horace B. Strait	U.S. Representative from Minnesota's 2nd congressional district 1879 – 1881	Succeeded by Horace B. Strait
