= Samantha Vang =

American politician

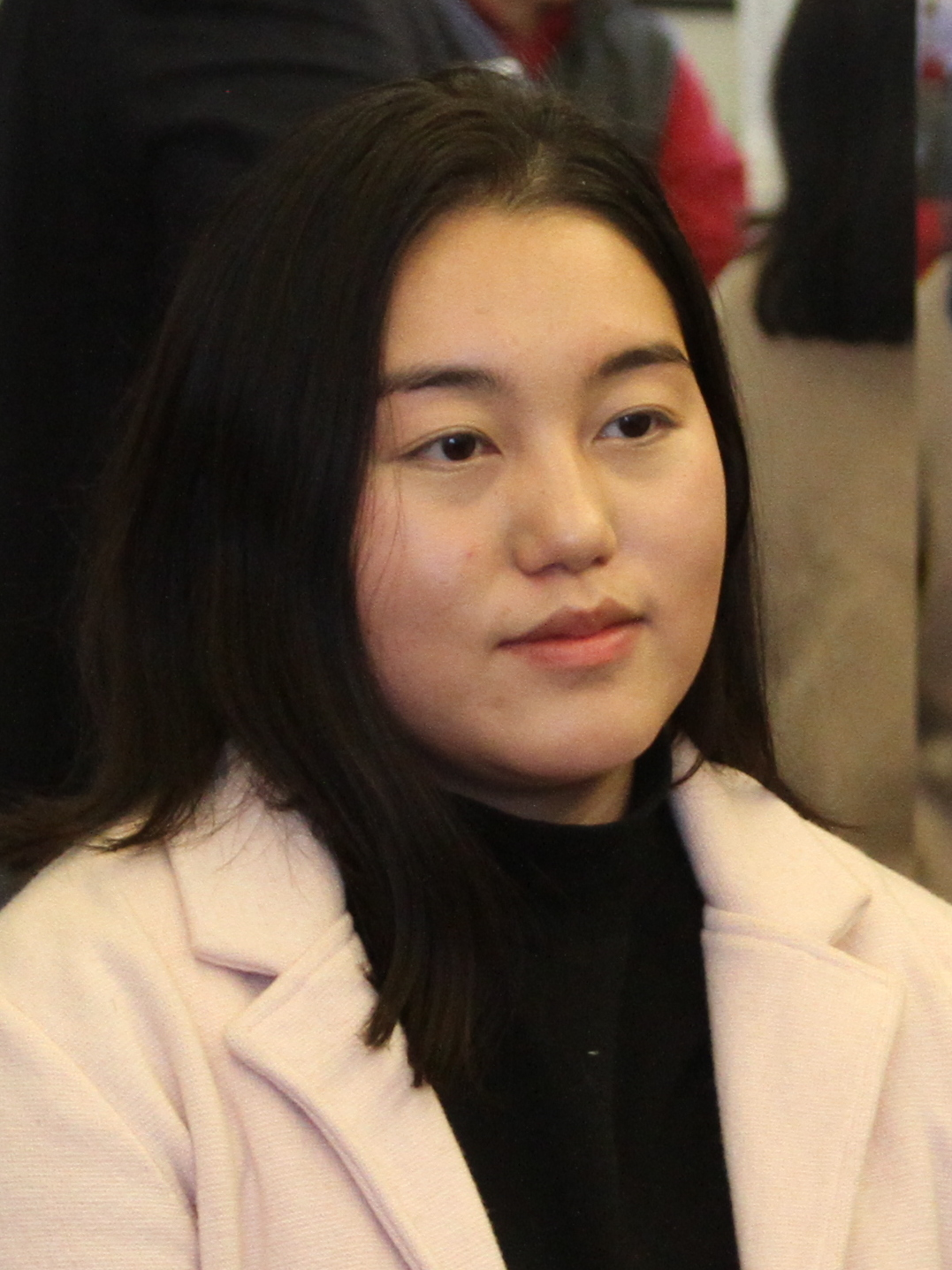

Member of the Minnesota House of Representatives from the 38B district 40B (2019-2022)
- Incumbent
- Assumed office January 8, 2019
- Preceded by: Debra Hilstrom

Personal details
- Born: 1993 or 1994 (age 31–32) Minneapolis, Minnesota, U.S.
- Party: Democratic (DFL)
- Education: Gustavus Adolphus College

Samantha Vang (born 1993/1994) is an American politician serving in the Minnesota House of Representatives since 2019. A member of the Minnesota Democratic–Farmer–Labor Party (DFL), Vang represents District 38B in the northwestern Twin Cities metropolitan area, which includes parts of the cities of Brooklyn Center and Brooklyn Park in Hennepin County.

== Early life, education, and career ==
Vang was born and raised in north Minneapolis. Her parents are Hmong refugees from Thailand. She graduated from Robbinsdale Armstrong High School and from Gustavus Adolphus College, with a Bachelor of Arts in political science and communications.

== Minnesota House of Representatives ==
Vang was elected to the Minnesota House of Representatives in 2018, after the retirement of incumbent Debra Hilstrom, and has been reelected every two years since.

In 2021–22, Vang served as vice chair of the Agriculture Finance and Policy Committee, co-chaired the People of Color and Indigenous Caucus, and co-founded the Minnesota Asian Pacific Caucus. Vang chairs the Agriculture Finance and Policy Committee, and sits on the Environment and Natural Resources Finance and Policy, Higher Education Finance and Policy, and Legacy Finance Committees.

In the aftermath of the shooting of Daunte Wright by a police officer in Brooklyn Center, Vang's hometown and constituency, she spoke out on the need to enforce the oversight ability of the Peace Officer Standards and Training Board in Minnesota, and the need to terminate the statute of limitations for civil suits against law enforcement.

Vang has introduced two bills into the legislature proposing an end to commercial turtle harvesting in Minnesota: one in 2019, which did not make it into the final 2019 Fish and Game bill in the Senate, and one in 2021. She also authored a bill in 2021 that would allow cities to impose bans on any pesticide the Minnesota Department of Agriculture designated as "pollinator-lethal".

== Electoral history ==
2018 Minnesota State House - District 40B
Party	Candidate	Votes	%
Democratic (DFL)	Samantha Vang	10,512	72.76
Republican	Robert Marvin	3,903	27.02
Write-in		32	0.22
Total votes		14,447	100.0
Democratic (DFL) hold			

2020 Minnesota State House - District 40B
Party	Candidate	Votes	%
Democratic (DFL)	Samantha Vang (incumbent)	11,370	62.79
Republican	Charlotte Smith	4,574	25.26
Legal Marijuana Now	Mary O'Connor	2,147	11.86
Write-in		16	0.09
Total votes		18,107	100.0
Democratic (DFL) hold			

2022 Minnesota State House - District 38B
Party	Candidate	Votes	%
Democratic (DFL)	Samantha Vang (incumbent)	7,753	72.73
Republican	Robert Marvin	2,892	27.13
Write-in		15	0.14
Total votes		10,660	100.0
Democratic (DFL) hold			

== Personal life ==
Vang resides in Brooklyn Center, Minnesota.
