= House rule =

Unofficial modifications to official game rules

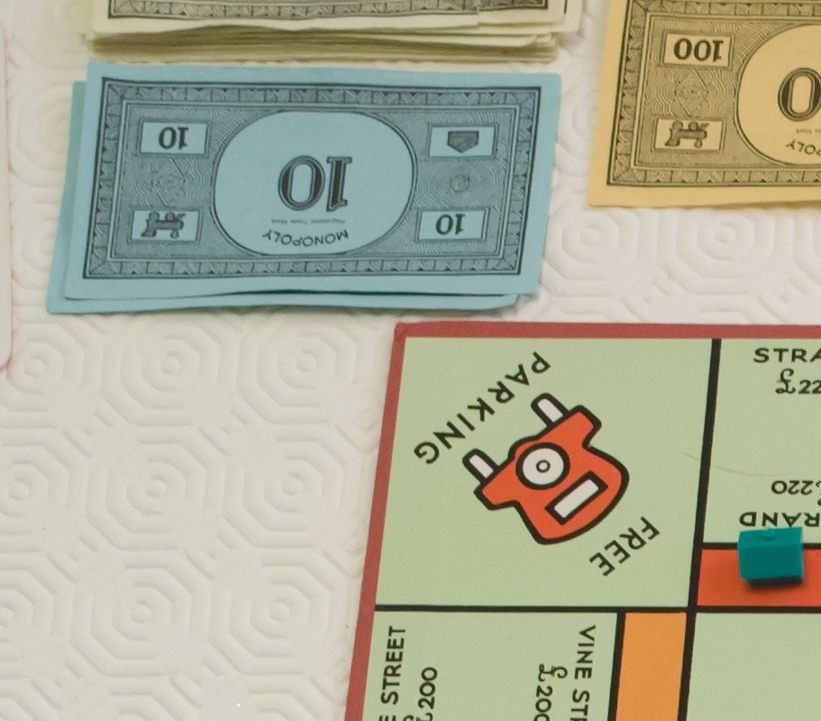
A common Monopoly house rule is to place money from tax fines in the middle of the board, and agreeing that any player landing on the "Free Parking" space can take all of the money.

House rules are unofficial modifications to official game rules adopted by individual groups of players. House rules may include the removal or alteration of existing rules, or the addition of new rules. Such modifications are common in board games such as Monopoly and role-playing games such as Dungeons & Dragons.

A common Uno house rule is to allow players to "stack" +2 cards to increase the penalty. In this scenario, the next player would need to draw 4 cards, not 2, unless they also have a +2 card to stack it further.

== Board games ==
Monopoly is frequently played with slightly different rules from those provided by the manufacturers, to the extent that, according to a reviewer at Computer Gaming World, "virtually no-one plays the game with the rules as written". Some video game versions of Monopoly have options where popular house rules can be enabled. In 2014, Hasbro, the publisher of Monopoly, used a Facebook poll to determine the five most popular house rules, then released a "House Rules Edition" of the game incorporating those rules.

== Role-playing games ==
In role-playing games, the term house rule signifies a deviation of game play from the official rules. Game systems may encourage, discourage, or ignore the possibility of house rules entirely. House rules are usually explicitly forbidden in tournament or official settings, but are commonly used in casual settings.

House rules can range from the tiniest of changes or additions to substantial deviations that alter the entire flow of gameplay, depending on the needs of the player group. Most groups have house rules to some extent. In miniature wargaming, house rules may be used to represent equally unofficial miniature conversions or can be used as scenario specific rules.

House rules date back to the earliest days of role-playing: the original edition of Dungeons & Dragons suggested that players should have a copy of the Chainmail historical wargame for measurement and combat rules and, even more confusingly, it presumed ownership of the Avalon Hill game Outdoor Survival (at the time, Avalon Hill was a competitor to D&D's publisher, TSR, Inc.; later, TSR and Avalon Hill would come under the Hasbro/Wizards of the Coast umbrella). Since many players who purchased D&D did not own copies of Chainmail or Outdoor Survival, they simply made up rules to cover the holes in D&D; many of these house rules later became the basis for Advanced Dungeons & Dragons.

Most house rules are made up by the members of a particular group of players and are never published. Generally, the companies that produce wargames allow their use alongside official rulesets as long as it is non-commercial, as is the case with Games Workshop.

Any rule book that is not a part of the core rule books, even if it ultimately comes from the original publishers of the game, could be seen as being house rules.

== Legal aspects ==
In a United States law case. Lefkowitz v. Great Minneapolis Surplus Store, Inc (1957), Great Minneapolis Surplus Store advertised some fur coats for sale for $1 each, "first come first served", then argued (unsuccessfully) that they had a "house rule" stating that bargains were limited to women only. The Supreme Court of Minnesota readily disposed of the store's argument:

The defendant contends that the offer was modified by a "house rule" to the effect that only women were qualified to receive the bargains advertised. The advertisement contained no such restriction. This objection may be disposed of briefly by stating that, while an advertiser has the right at any time before acceptance to modify his offer, he does not have the right, after acceptance, to impose new or arbitrary conditions not contained in the published offer.
