= Debra Hilstrom =

American politician

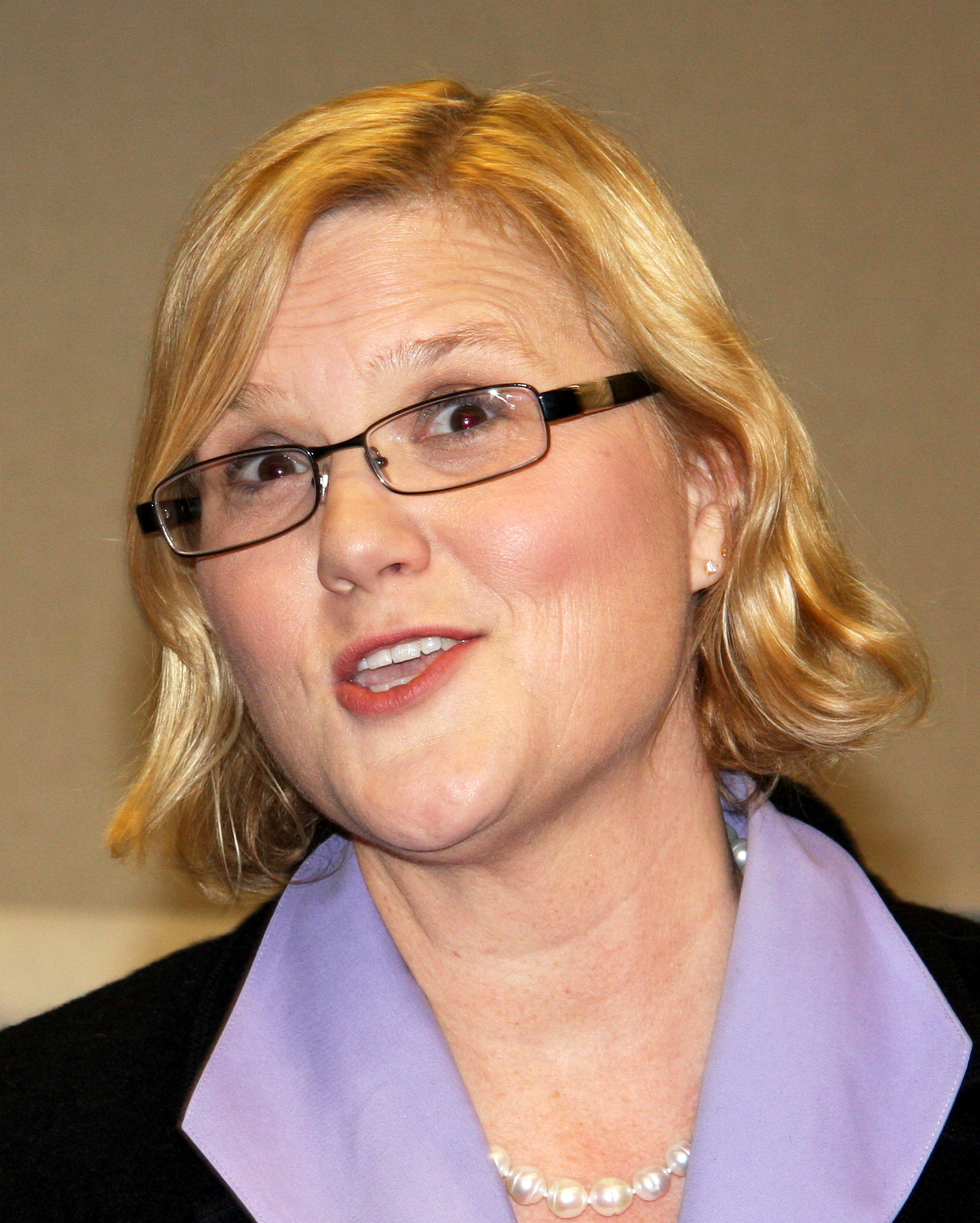

Member of the Minnesota House of Representatives from the 40B district 47B (2001–2003), 46B (2003–2013)
- In office January 3, 2001 – January 7, 2019
- Preceded by: Phil Carruthers
- Succeeded by: Samantha Vang

Personal details
- Born: June 21, 1968 (age 58) Brooklyn Center, Minnesota
- Party: Minnesota Democratic–Farmer–Labor Party
- Spouse: Joel
- Children: 2
- Education: University of Minnesota (B.A.); William Mitchell College of Law (J.D)
- Occupation: Lawyer

Debra J. Hilstrom (born June 21, 1968) is an American politician and former member of the Minnesota House of Representatives. A member of the Minnesota Democratic–Farmer–Labor Party (DFL), she represented District 40B, which included portions of the city of Brooklyn Center in Hennepin County in the Twin Cities metropolitan area. She was a candidate in the 2014 Minnesota Secretary of State election. She ran for Minnesota Attorney General in 2018, but lost the August 14 primary to Congressman Keith Ellison.

== Early life, education, and career ==
Hilstrom graduated from Park Center Senior High School in Brooklyn Park, then went on to the University of Minnesota in Minneapolis, earning her B.A. in sociology in 1990. She graduated from the William Mitchell College of Law in Saint Paul in 2010, earning a J.D. She served on the Brooklyn Center Planning Commission and was an advocate for the Brooklyn Center Domestic Abuse Intervention Program. She was a member of the Brooklyn Center City Council from 1995 to 2000.

== Minnesota House of Representatives ==
Hilstrom was first elected in 2000 and was re-elected every two years until she did not seek re-election in 2018. She was chair of the Local Government and Metropolitan Affairs Committee during the 2007–2008 biennium, and served as an assistant minority leader during the 2003–2004 biennium. She served as Deputy Minority Leader during the 2011–2012 legislative session.

== 2014 Minnesota Secretary of State campaign ==
Hilstrom announced on June 21, 2013, her candidacy for the 2014 Minnesota Secretary of State election.
