= Wallace B. Douglas =

American judge

Wallace Douglas
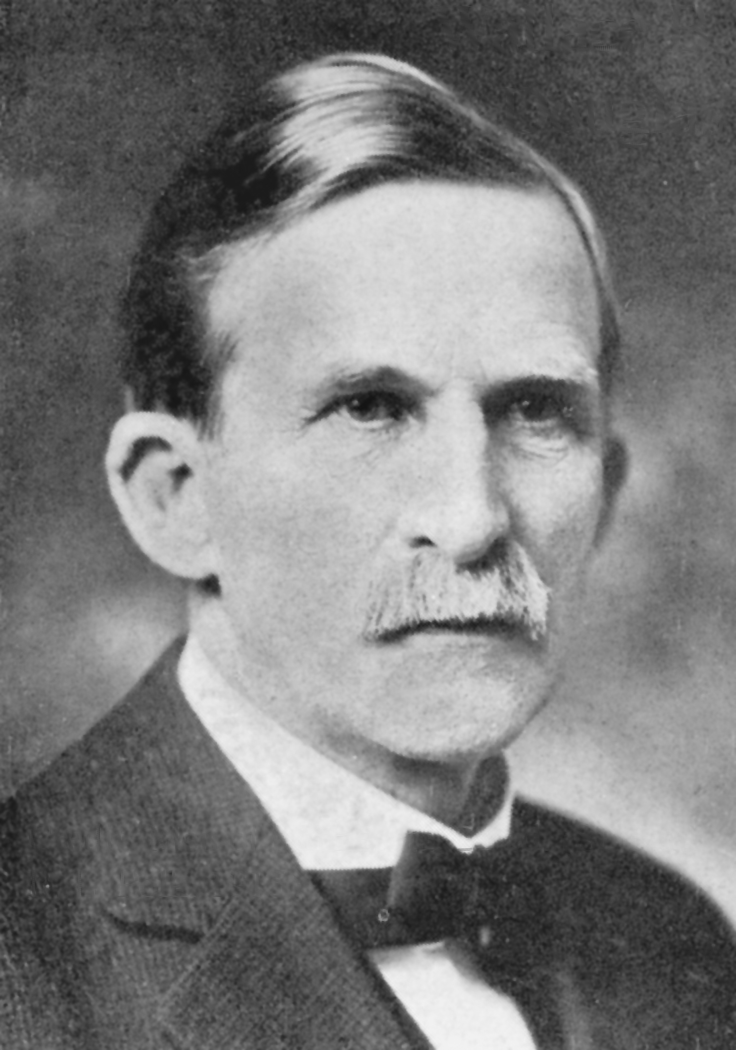

Associate Justice of the Minnesota Supreme Court
- In office 1904–1905

10th Attorney General of Minnesota
- In office 1899–1904
- Preceded by: Henry W. Childs
- Succeeded by: William J. Donahower

Member of the Minnesota House of Representatives
- In office 1895–1899

Personal details
- Born: Wallace Barton Douglas; September 21, 1852 Leyden, New York, U.S.
- Died: December 9, 1930 (aged 78) Ferndale, Washington, U.S.
- Resting place: Prairie Home Cemetery
- Party: Republican
- Education: University of Michigan (LLB)

Wallace Barton Douglas (September 21, 1852 – December 9, 1930) was an American lawyer, jurist, and politician.

== Early life and education ==
Wallace B. Douglas was born in Leyden, New York on September 21, 1852 or 1854. He attended the Cazenovia Seminary, and received his law degree from the University of Michigan Law School in 1875.

== Career ==
Douglas moved to Moorhead, Minnesota in 1883 and practiced law. He served as Moorhead City attorney and Clay County attorney. He also served on the Moorhead Board of Education and was the president of the board. Douglas served in the Minnesota House of Representatives from 1895 to 1899 and was a Republican.

He served as Minnesota Attorney General from 1899 to 1904. He was then appointed to the Minnesota Supreme Court in 1904 and served until 1905. Douglas served as chairman of the Minnesota Board of Forestry. Douglas Lodge in Itasca State Park was named after him.

== Personal life ==
Douglas died suddenly in Ferndale, Washington on December 9, 1930. He was buried at Prairie Home Cemetery in Moorhead.
