= Myles Mace =

American lawyer

Myles La Grange Mace (10 October 1911 – 24 March 2000) was a long-time professor at the Harvard Business School. He was a pioneer in the study of entrepreneurship and corporate governance.

== Early life ==
Mace was born in Montevideo, Minnesota, son of Jack Mace. He graduated from the University of Minnesota in 1934 and William Mitchell College of Law (then the St. Paul College of Law) in 1936. He was admitted to the Minnesota Bar, but decided to further his education at the Harvard Business School, where he received his M.B.A. in 1938. He took a job at HBS after graduation as a research associate before leaving for military service four years later. He left the U.S. Air Force in 1946 as a lieutenant colonel, having been awarded the Bronze Star with Oak Leaf Cluster.

== Career at HBS ==
Mace returned to HBS and created the first-ever course in entrepreneurship at Harvard. Titled The Management of New Enterprises, the course has remained, in various incarnations, a fixture of the HBS curriculum for decades and is regarded as the foundation of the School's extensive entrepreneurial management program.

Mace's longstanding interest in corporate governance began with the research he undertook for his Harvard doctoral dissertation, which was published as a book in 1948 under the title The Boards of Directors of Small Corporations. Following the publication of two additional books, Growth and Development of Executives and Management Problems of Corporate Acquisitions, Mace took a leave of absence from his teaching duties to undertake a project involving in-depth interviews with more than 100 chief executive officers and board members. The result was the 1971 publication of the influential book Directors: Myth and Reality.

Mace's research on boards of directors aroused significant interest and controversy in the business community by uncovering the fact that many boards were too symbolic mere rubber stamps for top management. Putting his research into practice, Mace served on the boards of Litton Industries; Interchemical Corp.; Jostens, Inc.; Hanes Corp.; Squibb BeechNut; Camp, Dresser & McKee; United Technologies; and Harte-Hanks Newspapers.

In 1955, Mace accepted an offer to join Charles B. (Tex) Thornton, who had just bought the Litton Co., a small electronics firm in California. Working with Thornton from 1955 to 1958 as vice president and general manager of the Electronics Equipment Division, Mace guided Litton's annual sales growth from $3 million to more than $80 million, as the company went on to become one of the most famous conglomerates in the history of American business.

Mace returned to HBS, where he remained until his retirement in 1972. During those years, he involved himself in a number of School activities, from teaching in a program for faculty members from foreign business schools to serving as the School's first associate dean for external affairs.

== Family ==
Mace married Adelaide Rowley, daughter of Professor Frank B. Rowley, and had at least three children, sons Myles Jr., Nicky and Terry (Terrence).

== Retirement ==
In retirement, Mace remained active despite becoming blind because of glaucoma. He acted as contributing editor of the Harvard Business Review from 1975 to 1978. He also continued to serve on several boards, wrote articles, and was frequently consulted by former students and colleagues. In 1984, Mace received HBS’s highest honor, the Distinguished Service Award.

He died in Massachusetts in 2000.

== Archives and records ==
- Myles L. Mace papers at Baker Library Special Collections, Harvard Business School
