= Ambrose Tighe =

American politician

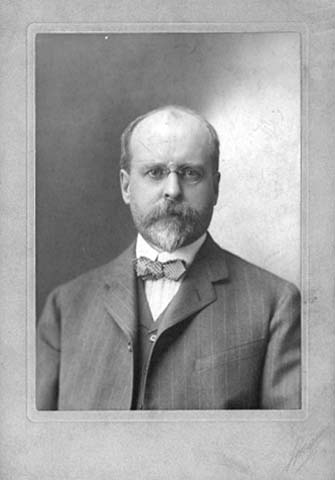
Ambrose Tighe

Ambrose Tighe (May 8, 1859 – November 11, 1928) was an American lawyer, politician, and academic from Minnesota. He was one of the five co-founders of William Mitchell College of Law.

== Early life ==
Tighe was a first-generation American, born and raised in Brooklyn, New York. His grandfather, an Episcopalian missionary, had emigrated there from Ireland in the early nineteenth century. His father James was also a lawyer, educated at New York University, although he did not practice extensively, focusing instead on a career in business. Tighe attended preparatory school at Adelphi Academy and in 1879 graduated from Yale University, where he was a member of Phi Beta Kappa and the Skull and Bones secret society.

== Career ==
After graduating from Yale, he briefly worked as a reporter for the New York Tribune, and then relocated to Frankfort, Kentucky. He read law there and was admitted to the state bar in 1880. In June of the same year he was elected the Douglas Fellow at Yale, which allowed him to continue his academic studies at the school. In January 1882, the college made him a lecturer in the Latin Department, and he taught courses on Roman Law until June 1885.

Tighe published his notes the following year in a book entitled, The Development of the Roman Constitution. It was a popular textbook in the subject at Yale and other Ivy League colleges. In recognition of his work in Roman history, Yale awarded him an M.A. in 1891.

After further reading law in New York City, Tighe moved to St. Paul, Minnesota, in 1886, where he embarked upon an impressive career. In 1890, he was named general counsel for Mutual Life Insurance Company of New York, and in 1900 he accepted the same position at the Eastman Kodak Company. Tighe served in the Minnesota House of Representatives as a Republican from 1903 to 1909. His son Richard Lodge Tighe also served in the Minnesota House of Representatives.

This was followed in 1917 by a two-year engagement as lead counsel for the infamous Minnesota Commission of Public Safety, then a term as president of the Minnesota State Bar Association in 1920 and an appointment as St. Paul City Attorney from 1920-28.

In 1900, while President of the Ramsey County Bar Association, he and Hiram F. Stevens, Moses Clapp, Thomas D. O'Brien, and Clarence Halbert founded the St. Paul College of Law, the first predecessor school of William Mitchell College of Law. Tighe served on the Board of Trustees and taught courses there on public corporations until his death in 1928.

== Influence ==
Tighe was very well-connected, considered to be one the social elites in St. Paul at the turn of the twentieth century. One of his many affiliations was with The Informal Club, a small organization whose members included James J. Hill, Cass Gilbert, Judge Walter Henry Sanborn, General Wesley Merritt, Congressman Thomas Wilson, and Justice William B. Mitchell. Tighe was also close with President William Howard Taft (S&B 1878) and U.S. Solicitor General Lloyd Wheaton Bowers (S&B 1879).

== Publications ==
- The Theory and Law of Water Works Securities, 13 Yale L.J. 165 (1903).
- The Theory of the Minnesota 'Safety Commission' Act, 3 Minn. L. Rev. 1 (1918).
