= William P. Murphy (judge) =

American judge

William Murphy

Associate Justice of the Minnesota Supreme Court
- In office 1955–1972
- Appointed by: Orville Freeman

Personal details
- Born: July 6, 1898; St. Cloud, Minnesota, U.S.
- Died: April 22, 1986 (aged 87); Hastings, Minnesota, U.S.
- Education: St. Paul College of Law (LLB)

William P. Murphy (July 6, 1898 – April 22, 1986) was an American jurist who served as an associate justice of the Minnesota Supreme Court from 1955 to 1972.

== Early life and education ==
Born in St. Cloud, Minnesota, Murphy graduated from Cathedral High School in St. Cloud, Minnesota. He then received his law degree from the St. Paul College of Law, a predecessor to the William Mitchell College of Law in Saint Paul, Minnesota.

== Career ==
Murphy practiced law in St. Cloud and Saint Paul, Minnesota. He then worked in the legal department of the Capitol Trust & Savings Bank in St. Paul between 1922 and 1924, and was in private practice in St. Cloud from then until 1939. In 1939, he became an assistant U.S. attorney, and from 1952 he served as regional director of the Office of Price Stabilization.

Murphy left government service in 1953 to practice with a St. Paul law firm. In 1955, Governor Orville Freeman appointed him to the Minnesota Supreme Court. Murphy left the court in 1972, and in 1975, the U.S. Securities and Exchange Commission appointed Murphy a special agent.

== Personal life ==
Murphy died in Hastings, Minnesota.

== See also ==
Lefkowitz v. Great Minneapolis Surplus Store, Inc
