= William Mitchell College of Law =

Private law school in Saint Paul, Minnesota, USA

Coordinates: 44°56′31″N 93°8′17″W

- Motto: Practical Wisdom
- Established: 1956–2015
- School type: Private
- Endowment: $21.5 million
- Dean: Eric Janus
- Location: St. Paul, Minnesota, United States
- Enrollment: 930
- Faculty: 48 full-time; 300+ adjunct
- USNWR ranking: 134
- Bar pass rate: 94.2%
- Website: mitchellhamline.edu

The William Mitchell College of Law was a private law school from 1956 to 2015 in Saint Paul, Minnesota, United States. On December 9, 2015, the Hamline University School of Law and William Mitchell College of Law merged to form the Mitchell Hamline School of Law.

Before the 2015 merger, the law school was accredited by the American Bar Association, and offered full-time and part-time legal education in pursuit of the Juris Doctor degree.

== History ==
William Mitchell was the product of five predecessor schools, all in the Twin Cities, which ultimately merged in 1956. Although they varied in size and location, each one was originally established as a part-time, evening-program law school. This was meant to open the doors of the legal profession to men and women working full-time to support themselves and their families.

=== St. Paul College of Law ===
William Mitchell's first predecessor, the St. Paul College of Law, was founded in 1900 by five attorneys in Ramsey County. They intended the school to be an alternative for legal education in the state, with the only others being the University of Minnesota Law School and the outmoded nineteenth-century practice of "reading" law with a licensed practitioner.

Three of the five were transplants from the east coast: Hiram F. Stevens, Clarence Halbert, and Ambrose Tighe. Stevens, a Vermont native, had read law with New York Court of Appeals Judge John K. Porter and graduated from Columbia Law School. When former Justice William Mitchell of the Minnesota Supreme Court died before assuming the deanship, Stevens took his place. Halbert came from New York, having graduated from Yale Law School. Tighe, also from New York, earned bachelor's and master's degrees from Yale, where he was a member of the college's Skull and Bones society. The other two founders, Thomas O'Brien and Moses Clapp, came from Minnesota and Indiana. O'Brien read law in St. Paul and later served as a justice of the Minnesota Supreme Court. Clapp graduated from the University of Wisconsin Law School, served three terms as Minnesota Attorney General, and later represented Minnesota in the United States Senate.

The St. Paul College of Law's first class had twenty students and annual tuition amounted to $60. During its official existence, the school was housed in three different locations, all in downtown St. Paul. Classes were originally held in the top floor of the former Ramsey County Courthouse, which had stood at Fourth and Wabasha Streets before being torn down. In 1917, the school moved to the McColl Building, which still stands today, at Fifth and Jackson Streets. Finally, from 1921 until after the merger, the law school occupied what was known as the Berkey Mansion, at Sixth and College Streets. That building, also long since torn down, was located in the middle of the current Kellogg Boulevard, just south of the entrance to the Minnesota History Center.

Until 1938, when it was accredited by the ABA, the law school relied entirely upon local attorneys and judges for its faculty and administration. One of them was future Associate Justice Harry Blackmun, a professor at the St. Paul College of Law from 1935 to 1941. Years later, after the merger, Justice Blackmun also served as a Trustee of William Mitchell. Others were Minnesota Supreme Court Justices George Bunn and Oscar Hallam, both of whom served as deans of the law school while on the bench.

=== Minneapolis law schools ===
Four Minneapolis law schools formed, all of which would eventually merge into William Mitchell. They were the Northwestern College of Law and the Minneapolis College of Law in 1912, the Minnesota College of Law in 1913, and the YMCA College of Law in 1919. Their apparent lack of institutional stability stands in contrast to the history of the St. Paul school. Among them they occupied more than a dozen different locations in downtown Minneapolis and were often beset by financial difficulties.

The Northwestern school was founded by George Young, a University of Minnesota law graduate and local entrepreneur. When the University of Minnesota began to consider discontinuing its part-time evening program in 1912, Young sensed an opportunity and stepped into the breach to provide a similar service. Northwestern operated without incident until 1926, when Young died. By 1928, the school had declared bankruptcy and its students transferred to the Minneapolis College of Law. Similarly, the YMCA school ceased functioning in 1934, despite discussions of a formal merger with the Minnesota College of Law.

Although incorporated in 1912, the Minneapolis school did not offer any formal classes until 1925. Its existence was dominated by funding issues, which were only alleviated by a formal merger with the Minnesota College of Law in 1940. The Minnesota school had been the most solvent of the four, so the two surviving Minneapolis law schools became one, the Minneapolis-Minnesota College of Law.

=== Merger ===
Discussions of a merger between the St. Paul College of Law and the Minneapolis-Minnesota College of Law began in 1952, but it wasn't until 1955 that they yielded tangible results. Due to shortcomings in the size of the faculty and its physical location, Minneapolis-Minnesota was repeatedly unsuccessful in gaining ABA approval. Without it, their students were not eligible for tuition assistance through the G.I. Bill. John Hervey, long-serving adviser to the ABA Section of Legal Education and Admission to the Bar, used the situation to help accomplish his goal of "improving legal education by pruning away the weak law schools and strengthening those that remained." Hervey intimated to the Minneapolis-Minnesota Trustees that he could ensure ABA approval so long as the school agreed to merge with the St. Paul College of Law. Conversely, Hervey hinted to the St. Paul Trustees that their school could lose ABA approval if they didn't agree to move forward with the merger.

In July 1956, after renewed negotiations prompted by Hervey, the Minneapolis-Minnesota College of Law (armed with provisional approval from the ABA) united with the St. Paul College of Law to become William Mitchell College of Law. The consolidated Board of Trustees selected the name to honor the St. Paul school's unofficial "first" dean, William B. Mitchell, who had been widely regarded as one of the finest U.S. jurists of the late nineteenth century.

=== Post-merger ===
The most pressing issue for WMCL Trustees after the merger was finding a new, permanent home for the school. The school reached an agreement with the University of St. Thomas to purchase land and construct its own building on the latter's undergraduate campus, located at 2100 Summit Avenue. In the interim, students enrolled at what was in name the same law school attended classes in different cities, with the Minneapolis students at their downtown campus and the St. Paul students at the Berkey Mansion. It wasn't until 1958 that the school truly unified under one roof.

The next few decades saw rapid expansion for the school and its programs. By 1976, William Mitchell had outgrown the space at St. Thomas and required larger facilities. The administration successfully purchased the building at 875 Summit Avenue, a former Catholic secondary school called Our Lady of Peace. In 1974, William Mitchell had launched its flagship legal journal, the William Mitchell Law Review. This journal later formed half of the merged Mitchell Hamline Law Review. By 1980, William Mitchell began offering traditional daytime classes and the option of full-time enrollment. In 1990, the school completed work on its campus additions, which included a new classroom building and the Warren E. Burger Law Library. The library houses WMCL's collection of nearly a half-million volumes, affords electronic access to thousands of additional documents, and provides extensive study space. Justice Sandra Day O'Connor accompanied Chief Justice Burger to the dedication. Continuing its tradition of attracting adjunct faculty from the state and federal bench, Donald Lay, Paul Magnuson, Donovan Frank, Edward Toussaint, Jr. and others have taught and continue teaching at WMCL. In 2010, William Mitchell launched an intellectual property law journal, Cybaris.

In 2000, to celebrate its one hundred years of legal education, Governor Jesse Ventura declared November 19–25 "William Mitchell Centennial Week" throughout the state. Later, William Mitchell became one of two law schools in the country that refused to let military recruiters on campus in protest against the Solomon Amendment.

== Employment and cost of attendance ==
According to William Mitchell's ABA-required employment disclosures, 59.1% of the Class of 2013 obtained full-time, long-term employment requiring a J.D. William Mitchell's Law School Transparency under-employment score is 19.1%, indicating the percentage of the Class of 2013 who are unemployed, pursuing an additional degree, or working in a non-professional, short-term, or part-time job nine months after graduation.

Tuition at William Mitchell for the 2014–2015 academic year is $38,620. The estimated cost of living provided by the school is $19,450. Assuming no tuition increases, a typical three-year course of study at William Mitchell therefore costs $174,210, or $58,070 per year.

== Profile and rankings ==
William Mitchell's 2012 entering class had 260 students, 81% of whom attended full-time. The median undergraduate GPA was 3.38 and the median LSAT score was 155. 51% of the class were men and 49% were women. 13% listed themselves as minorities. Total enrollment of 930 students made it one of the largest law schools in the Midwest at the time.

In 2013, the school was unranked by U.S. News & World Report. The school's part-time program in 2010 was ranked 40th.

== Academics ==
All 1Ls participate in a comprehensive course called Writing and Representation: Advice & Persuasion, or simply "WRAP." It focuses on legal research, reasoning, and writing, while providing a broad overview of critical skills like client interviewing and counseling, contract negotiation and drafting, dispute mediation, and pretrial litigation.

As 2Ls or 3Ls, students must take Advocacy, a course designed to teach basic litigation skills. Students are instructed in conducting discovery, examining witnesses, introducing exhibits, presenting opening and closing arguments, and presenting written and oral appellate arguments.

=== Special programs ===
Legal Practicum and Business Practicum are upper-level courses in which students, pairing up to form two-person law firms, hone their legal skills by handling a series of simulated cases. Each case requires mastery of integrated substantive and procedural law, and each firm must successfully participate in oral arguments, motion arguments, mediation, arbitration, negotiation, in-chambers settlement conferences, and a full-day jury trial. Students interview clients, conduct depositions, prepare pleadings and motions, compose memoranda, and draft various transactional documents. The coursework is performed under the supervision of two faculty members, as well as practicing lawyers and judges from the Twin Cities area.

=== Study abroad ===
The school belongs to the Consortium for Innovative Legal Education (CILE), in partnership with California Western School of Law, New England School of Law, and South Texas College of Law. CILE is the only program of its kind in the United States, offering students an opportunity to participate in programs and classes at any of the other three law schools.

Through CILE, opportunities to study abroad are available in summer and semester programs. Summer programs are offered at the University of Edinburgh, Charles University in the Czech Republic, the University of Malta, and the National University of Ireland, Galway, while semester programs are offered at Leiden University in the Netherlands and the University of Aarhus in Denmark.

== Centers and institutes ==
The Intellectual Property Institute advances the school's IP program, which features a curriculum focused on patent, trademark, and copyright law. The U.S. Patent and Trademark Office chose William Mitchell as one of six law schools to participate in its Law School Clinical Certification Program. Students are allowed to practice before the agency under the direction of a faculty supervisor.

The National Security Forum examines and debates the balance between safety and liberty in America. The Forum has hosted events and seminars featuring current and former officials from the Department of Justice, Department of State, the National Security Council, the Central Intelligence Agency, and the Federal Bureau of Investigation. Notable judges, professors, and journalists have also contributed to the Forum.

The Rosalie Wahl Legal Practice Center directs William Mitchell's clinic, externship, and skills programs. The clinical programs are designed to offer hands-on experience in practicing law, as well as convey the importance of public service. They were established in 1973, one of the first at an American law school.

The Tobacco Law Center works to improve tobacco control laws and policies at local, national, and international levels. Through research, policy development and analysis, technical assistance and consulting, the center aims to help lawmakers, nonprofit organizations, advocates, and health professionals address tobacco-related legal issues.

The Center for Elder Justice & Policy provides advocacy groups with resources, technology, and information to help seniors and their families. The Center also supports William Mitchell's elder law curriculum.

The Center for Negotiation & Justice is a collaboration between experienced negotiation practitioners and leading scholars in conflict and dispute resolution. Its mission is to explore, develop, and advance the connection between principled negotiation and social justice.

== Notable alumni ==
WMCL has more than 12,000 alumni, active in both the private and public sectors. More than one hundred current members of the Minnesota judiciary have graduated from William Mitchell. William Mitchell's most famous alumnus is Warren E. Burger, the fifteenth Chief Justice of the United States (graduated St. Paul College of Law, LL.B. 1931)

Other notable William Mitchell graduates include:

- Claude Henry Allen, Minnesota state representative
- August Andresen, former United States congressman
- Joe Atkins, Minnesota state representative
- Elmer A. Benson, former United States senator and Governor of Minnesota
- Bobby Joe Champion, Minnesota state representative
- Ray P. Chase, former United States congressman
- Tarryl Clark, former Minnesota state senator
- Richard Cohen, Minnesota state senator
- Roger L. Dell, former chief justice of the Minnesota Supreme Court
- Sean Duffy, former United States congressman from Wisconsin, Secretary of Transportation in the second Trump administration.
- Tom Emmer, United States Congressman and House Majority Whip, former Minnesota state representative and 2010 Republican candidate for governor of Minnesota
- William T. Francis, former U.S. ambassador to Liberia
- Chuck Halberg, lawyer and Minnesota state legislator
- Sam Hanson, former justice of the Minnesota Supreme Court
- Debra Hilstrom, Minnesota state representative
- Dewey W. Johnson, former United States congressman
- Matthew E. Johnson, chief judge, Minnesota Court of Appeals
- David Knutson, Minnesota state senator of District 37, 2003–2004
- Harold G. Krieger, Minnesota state legislator, judge, and lawyer
- Jim Lord, Minnesota politician
- Myles Mace, former distinguished professor, Harvard Business School
- Eric J. Magnuson, former chief justice of the Minnesota Supreme Court
- Paul A. Magnuson, Senior Judge, U.S. District Court for the District of Minnesota
- John J. McDonough, former mayor of Saint Paul
- Fred McNeill, former Minnesota Vikings player
- Robert W. Mattson, Jr., former Minnesota State Auditor
- Pat Mazorol, Minnesota state representative
- Helen M. Meyer, Justice of the Minnesota Supreme Court
- Ted Mondale, former Minnesota state senator and former chairman of the Metropolitan Council
- William P. Murphy, former Justice of the Minnesota Supreme Court
- Arthur E. Nelson, former United States senator
- Martin A. Nelson, former Justice of the Minnesota Supreme Court
- Scott Newman, Minnesota state senator
- Floyd B. Olson, former Governor of Minnesota
- Peter S. Popovich, former chief justice of the Minnesota Supreme Court
- Joey San Nicolas, Attorney General for the Northern Mariana Islands
- John B. Sanborn, Jr., former Judge, U.S. Court of Appeals for the Eighth Circuit
- Thomas D. Schall, former United States senator
- Linda Scheid, former Minnesota state senator
- Gary J. Schmidt, former Wisconsin state assemblyman
- Kenneth E. Scott, Minnesota state representative
- Corey Stewart Former candidate for Governor and Lt. Governor of Virginia, Chair, Board of Supervisors, Prince William County, Virginia
- Lena O. Smith, Minnesota's first African-American female lawyer
- Esther Tomljanovich, former Justice of the Minnesota Supreme Court
- Robert Vanasek, former Speaker of the Minnesota House of Representatives
- Robert Vogel, former U.S. Attorney for the District of North Dakota and Justice of the North Dakota Supreme Court
- Jean Wagenius, Minnesota state representative
- Rosalie E. Wahl, former Justice of the Minnesota Supreme Court
- Torrey Westrom, Minnesota state senator
- Luther Youngdahl, former governor of Minnesota, justice of the Minnesota Supreme Court, and judge of the U.S. District Court for the District of Columbia
- Oscar Youngdahl, former United States congressman
- G. Aaron Youngquist, former Minnesota Attorney General and Assistant U.S. Attorney General

== See also ==
- List of defunct law schools in the United States
