= Chuck Halberg =

American lawyer

Charles C. "Chuck" Halberg (born November 20, 1942) was an American politician and lawyer.

Halberg lived in Burnsville, Minnesota with his wife and family. He graduated from St. Olaf College with a bachelor's degree and from William Mitchell College of Law with a Juris Doctor degree. Halberg was admitted to the Minnesota bar. Halberg served in the Minnesota House of Representatives from 1979 to 1986 and in the Minnesota Senate in 1991 and 1992. He was a Republican.
