= Harold G. Krieger =

American lawyer, judge, and politician

Member of the Minnesota Senate from the 33rd district
- In office January 1, 1973 – January 1, 1975 (Note: The official end date of Krieger's final term is uncertain due to his election to the court.)

Member of the Minnesota Senate from the 4th district
- In office January 7, 1963 – December 31, 1972

Personal details
- Born: October 3, 1926 New Ulm, Minnesota, U.S.
- Died: April 22, 1995 (aged 68) Rochester, Minnesota, U.S.
- Party: Republican
- Spouse: M. Pauline
- Children: 4
- Education: New Ulm High School; Macalester College (BA); St. Paul College of Law (LLB)
- Occupation: Politician, lawyer, judge

Military service
- Allegiance: United States
- Branch/service: United States Navy
- Battles/wars: World War II

Harold G. Krieger (October 3, 1926 – April 22, 1995) was an American lawyer, judge, and politician.

Krieger was born in New Ulm, Minnesota. He served in the United States Navy during World War II. Krieger received his bachelor's degree from Macalester College and his law degree from the St. Paul College of Law. Krieger lived in Rochester, Minnesota, with his wife and family and practiced law. Krieger served in the Minnesota Senate from 1963 until 1974 and was a Republican. He then served as a Minnesota District Court judge from 1975 until his death in 1995. Krieger died from cancer at his home in Rochester, Minnesota.

Krieger was an unsuccessful candidate for the Republican nomination for lieutenant governor of Minnesota in 1970.
