= Paul Rosenthal (Minnesota politician) =

American politician

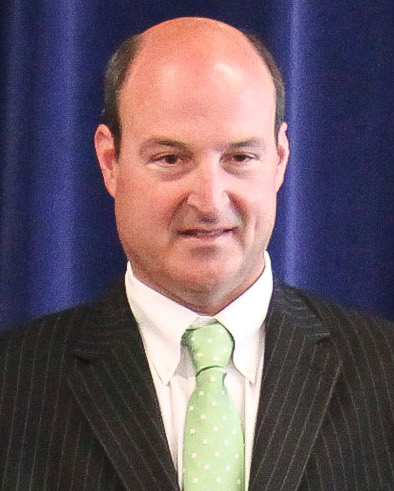

Member of the Minnesota House of Representatives from the 49B district
- In office January 8, 2013 – September 5, 2018
- Preceded by: Pat Mazorol (District 41B)
- Succeeded by: Steve Elkins

Member of the Minnesota House of Representatives from the 41B district
- In office January 6, 2009 – January 3, 2011
- Preceded by: Neil Peterson
- Succeeded by: Pat Mazorol

Personal details
- Born: February 29, 1960 (age 66) New York
- Party: Minnesota Democratic–Farmer–Labor Party
- Spouse: Elizabeth McCall
- Children: 2
- Education: New York University

Paul D. Rosenthal (born February 29, 1959) is a Minnesota politician and former member of the Minnesota House of Representatives. A member of the Minnesota Democratic–Farmer–Labor Party (DFL), he represented District 49B, which included west Bloomington, south Edina, northeast Eden Prairie, and southwest Minnetonka in Hennepin County in the Twin Cities metropolitan area. In 2026, he ran for the DFL endorsement for the Senate District 50 seat being vacated by Melissa Wiklund.

== Early life, education, and career ==
Rosenthal attended New York University in New York City, earning his B.A. in metropolitan studies and urban planning. He was an international currency trader by profession, and was also a partner in ADRZ, a nonprofit development group that works to save endangered historic buildings.

== Minnesota House of Representatives ==
Rosenthal was first elected in 2008. He was unseated by Republican Pat Mazorol in the 2010 general election. In 2012, he won his seat back against Terry Jacobson. He announced in June 2018 that he had accepted a job as director of external affairs for Western Governors University in the state of Utah and would not seek reelection. He resigned effective on September 5, 2018.

== Personal life ==
Rosenthal is Jewish. He is married to Elizabeth McCall. They have two children.
