= Horace B. Strait =

American politician (1835–1894)

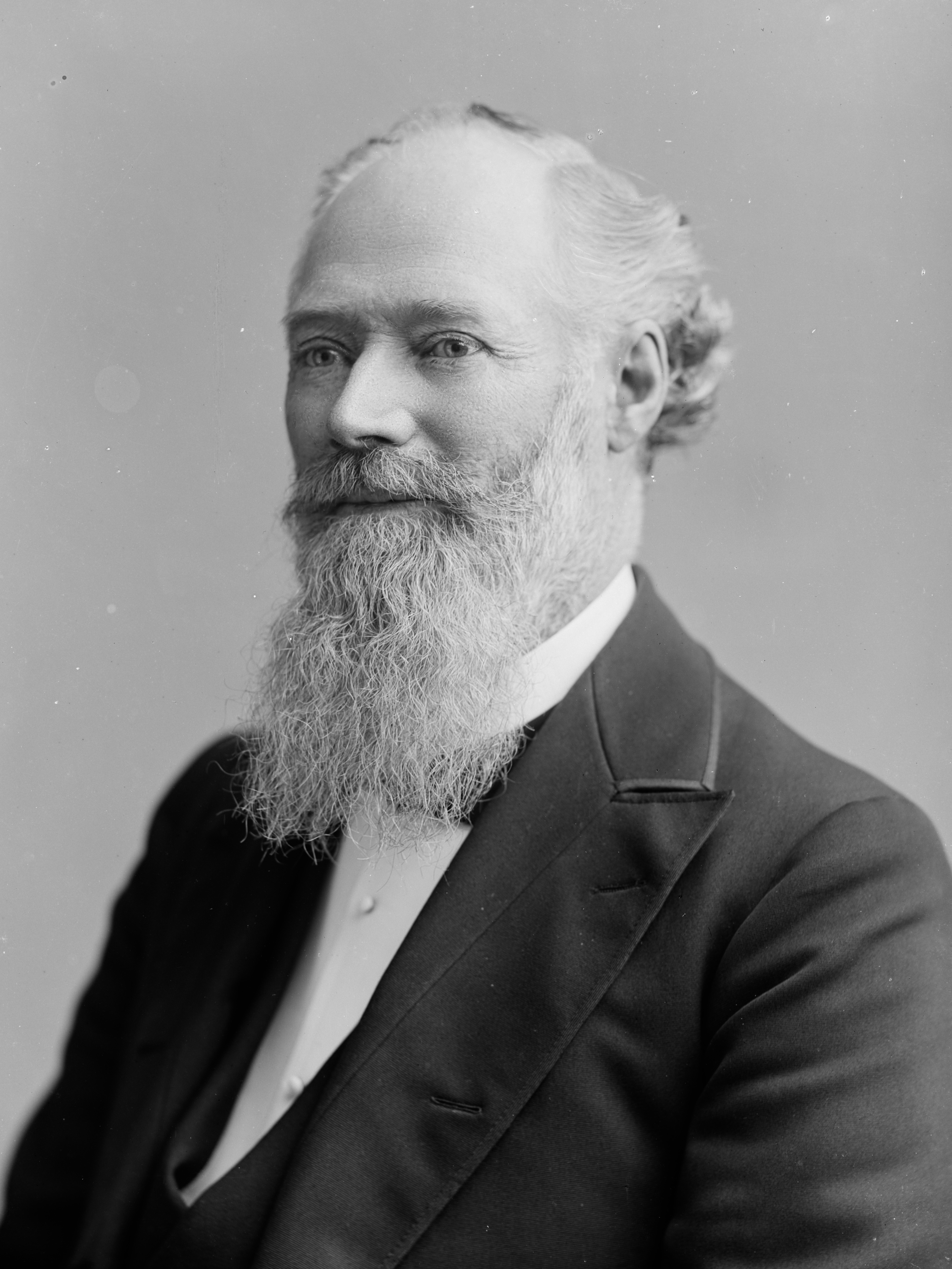

Member of the U.S. House of Representatives from Minnesota
- In office March 4, 1881 – March 3, 1887
- Preceded by: Henry Poehler
- Succeeded by: John L. MacDonald
- Constituency: 2nd district (1881–1883); 3rd district (1883–1887)
- In office March 4, 1873 – March 3, 1879
- Preceded by: John T. Averill
- Succeeded by: Henry Poehler
- Constituency: 2nd district

Personal details
- Born: Horace Burton Strait; January 26, 1835 Potter County, Pennsylvania, U.S.
- Died: February 25, 1894 (aged 59) Cd. Juárez, Chihuahua, Mexico
- Party: Republican
- Spouse: Helen Strait

Military service
- Branch/service: Union Army
- Years of service: 1862–1865
- Rank: Major

Horace Burton Strait (January 26, 1835 – February 25, 1894) was a U.S. representative from Minnesota.

He was born in Potter County, Pennsylvania, January 26, 1835 and moved with his parents to Indiana in 1846. In 1855 he settled near Jordan, Minnesota, and engaged in agricultural pursuits. In 1860 he moved to Shakopee, Minnesota and ran a general store.

In 1862, Strait entered the Union Army as a captain in the Ninth Regiment, Minnesota Volunteer Infantry, being promoted to major in 1864. He served at the close of the war as inspector general on the staff of General John McArthur and was honorably discharged in 1865.

He became a trustee of the Minnesota Hospital for the Insane in 1866 and mayor of Shakopee in 1870, 1871, and 1872, while engaging in mercantile pursuits, manufacturing, and banking.

Strait was elected as a Republican to the 43rd, 44th, and 45th congresses, but failed in his reelection bid in 1878 to the 46th congress. However, two years later he was elected to the 47th and reelected to 48th and 49th congresses.

Strait was more than the "tongueless wirepuller" that one enemy labeled him. Certainly he did not speak much. Most congressmen were sparing in their participation on the floor, but with a very few exceptions, Strait never said anything. One might scan the indexes of the Congressional Record for session after session and never find him intervening with a single word. What measures he dealt with mostly handled the public lands, in most cases opening them wider to settlement. He resisted measures that would take the government land grant away from the Northern Pacific Railroad.

Strait's district, the Third Minnesota, was in the southern half of the state. It had been designed to guarantee a ten thousand vote Republican majority, made the firmer by a heavy Norwegian vote. But the protective tariff made that control less sure as the 1880s went on. Farmers needed cheap lumber and would have been happy to get it from anywhere, Canada included. Wheat growers complained that the tariff did not protect them from massive imports of grain out of Manitoba. Strait therefore had to stand with the shrinking group of low tariff Republicans in the House. During the 1870s, he would have had quite a lot of company; by the end of the 1880s, his stand was a lonely one, virtually on the party's outskirts. He was one of only three Republicans in 1886 to support the Morrison tariff reduction bill. Feeling increasingly isolated, Strait chose not to run for re-election in 1886.

Strait served as chairman of the Committee on Militia in the Forty-seventh Congress and resumed banking at Shakopee while also engaging in agricultural pursuits.

Strait died February 25, 1894, on a train at Cd. Juárez, Chihuahua, Mexico, en route to the United States and is interred at Valley Cemetery, Shakopee, Minnesota.

U.S. House of Representatives
Preceded by John T. Averill	U.S. Representative from Minnesota's 2nd congressional district 1873 – 1879	Succeeded by Henry Poehler
Preceded by Henry Poehler	U.S. Representative from Minnesota's 2nd congressional district 1881 – 1883	Succeeded by James Wakefield
Preceded by William D. Washburn	U.S. Representative from Minnesota's 3rd congressional district 1883 – 1887	Succeeded by John L. MacDonald
