= Pat Mazorol =

American politician

Member of the Minnesota House of Representatives from the 41B district
- In office January 4, 2011 – 2013
- Preceded by: Paul Rosenthal
- Succeeded by: Paul Rosenthal

Personal details
- Born: March 20, 1949 (age 77)
- Party: Republican
- Spouse: Barbara
- Children: 2
- Education: University of Minnesota; William Mitchell College of Law
- Profession: Business executive, attorney, legislator

Patrick A. "Pat" Mazorol (born March 20, 1949) is a Minnesota politician and a former member of the Minnesota House of Representatives who represented District 41B, which includes western Bloomington and southern Edina in Hennepin County, in the Twin Cities metropolitan area. A Republican, he is a former president and CEO of Securian Trust Company, and a former senior vice president of university relations at Bethel University in Arden Hills.

Mazorol was elected to the House in 2010. He served on the Civil Law, the Commerce and Regulatory Reform, the Higher Education Policy and Finance, and the Judiciary Policy and Finance committees. On May 21, 2011, he joined the House Republican Majority in calling for a referendum on amending the state constitution to define marriage as between a man and woman.

Mazorol graduated from Bloomington Kennedy High School in Bloomington, then went on to the University of Minnesota, receiving his B.A. in physics. He later earned his J.D. from William Mitchell College of Law in Saint Paul. He was a practicing attorney for 12 years.

Mazorol previously served on the Bloomington Human Rights Commission, was vice chair of the Board of Trustees for Bethel University, was a member of the Board of Directors of the Minnesota Private Colleges Council, the Board of Directors for United Hospital Foundation, the Twin Cities advisory board for The Salvation Army, and the governing board of Wooddale Church in Eden Prairie.

Mazorol did not seek a second term in 2012.
