= Dewey Johnson (Minnesota politician) =

American lawyer and politician

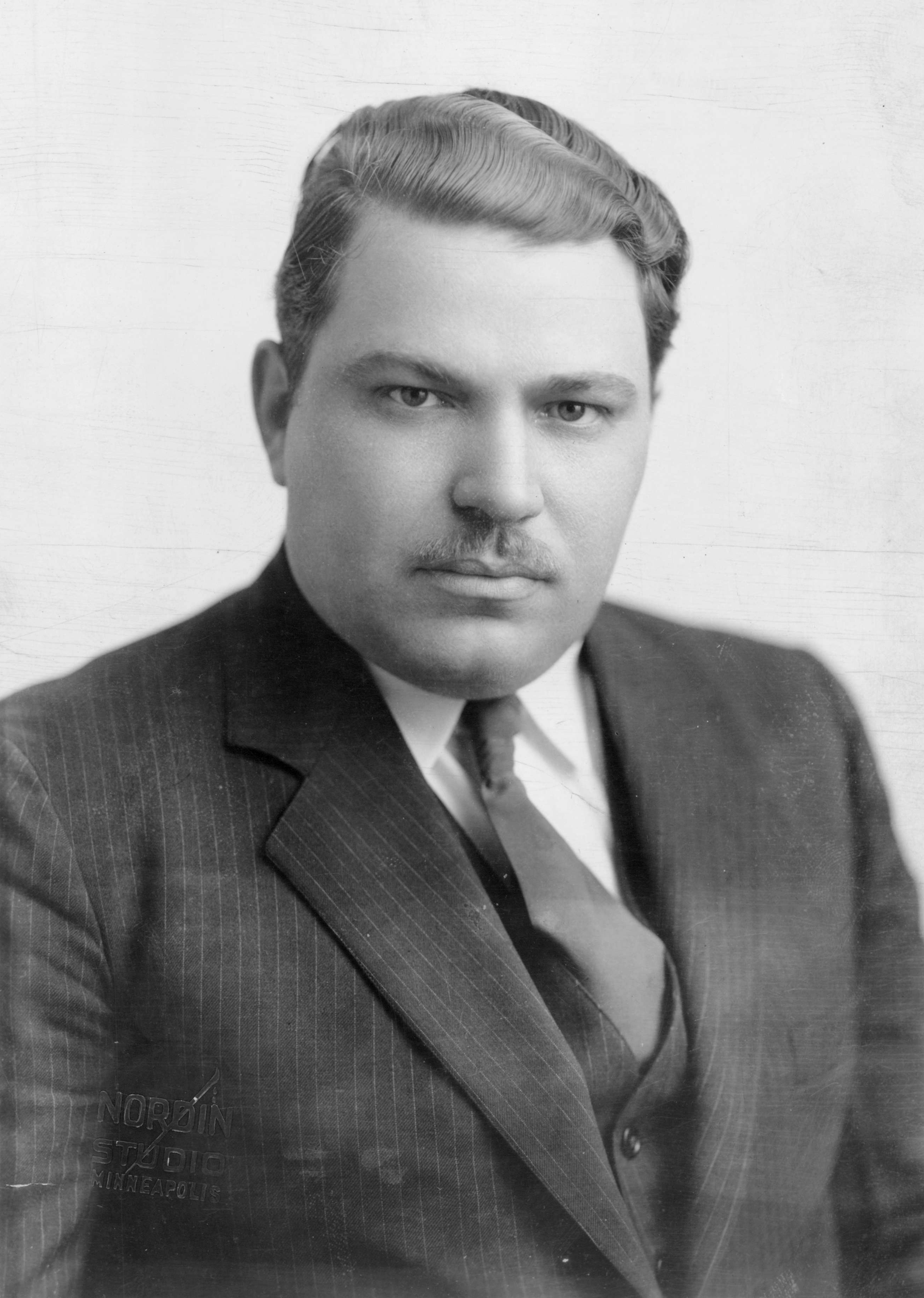
- Johnson in 1936

Member of the U.S. House of Representatives from Minnesota's 5th district
- In office January 3, 1937 – January 3, 1939
- Preceded by: Theodore Christianson
- Succeeded by: Oscar Youngdahl

Member of the Minnesota House of Representatives from the 31st district
- In office January 7, 1929 – January 6, 1935

Personal details
- Born: March 14, 1899 Minneapolis, Minnesota, U.S.
- Died: September 18, 1941 (aged 42) Minneapolis, Minnesota, U.S
- Resting place: Lakewood Cemetery
- Party: Farmer–Labor Party
- Education: University of Minnesota; YMCA Law School

Dewey William Johnson (March 14, 1899 – September 18, 1941) was an American lawyer and politician from Minnesota. Johnson was born in Minneapolis and attended the local public schools, followed by the University of Minnesota and William Mitchell College of Law (then the YMCA Law School).

After graduation from law school, he began work in the insurance business. He was elected to the Minnesota House of Representatives in 1929 and served until 1935. In 1934, he had been an unsuccessful candidate for election to the 74th congress. After his six-year stint in the Minnesota House, Johnson served as Deputy Commissioner of Insurance and as the state Fire Marshal. A second Congressional run in 1936 was successful; Johnson served as a member of the Farmer-Labor Party in the 75th congress, (January 3, 1937–January 3, 1939). However, in 1938 he was defeated for re-election by Oscar Youngdahl, a Republican, and when he again ran in 1940 against Youngdahl he was again defeated.

Johnson resumed his insurance practice in Minneapolis and also operated a retail radio sales business. He died in Minneapolis in 1941. He was buried in Lakewood Cemetery.

U.S. House of Representatives
Preceded by Theodore Christianson	U.S. Representative from Minnesota's 5th congressional district 1937–1939	Succeeded by Oscar Youngdahl
