= Clarence Halbert =

American lawyer and academic

Clarence Wells Halbert (August 31, 1874 – September 29, 1959) was an American lawyer and academic. He was one of the five co-founders of William Mitchell College of Law in Minnesota.

Halbert was born in Binghamton, New York. His family moved to St. Paul, Minnesota and he graduated from St. Paul High School in 1891. He graduated from Yale University in 1895 and Yale Law School in 1897. Returning to Minnesota, Halbert was admitted to practice in 1898 and joined a prominent local law firm managed by U.S. Senator and former Governor Cushman Davis, future U.S. Senator and Secretary of State Frank Kellogg, and Cordenio Severance. Four years later, he entered into partnership with his brother Hugh, with whom he practiced for the rest of his career.

In 1900, along with Hiram F. Stevens, Ambrose Tighe, Moses Clapp, and Thomas D. O'Brien, Halbert founded the St. Paul College of Law, the first predecessor of William Mitchell College of Law.

Halbert died in Bettendorf, Iowa, aged 85.
