= Richard Lodge Tighe =

American politician (1902–1938)

Richard Lodge Tighe (January 13, 1902 – April 30, 1938) was an American lawyer and politician.

Tighe was born in Saint Paul, Minnesota. He received his bachelor's degree from University of Minnesota and his law degree from University of Minnesota Law School. Tighe lived with his wife and family in Wayzata, Minnesota and he practiced law in Wayzata, Minnesota. Tighe served in the Minnesota House of Representatives from 1935 until his death in 1938. His father Ambrose Tighe also served in the Minnesota House of Representatives.
