= Oscar Youngdahl =

American politician (1893–1946)

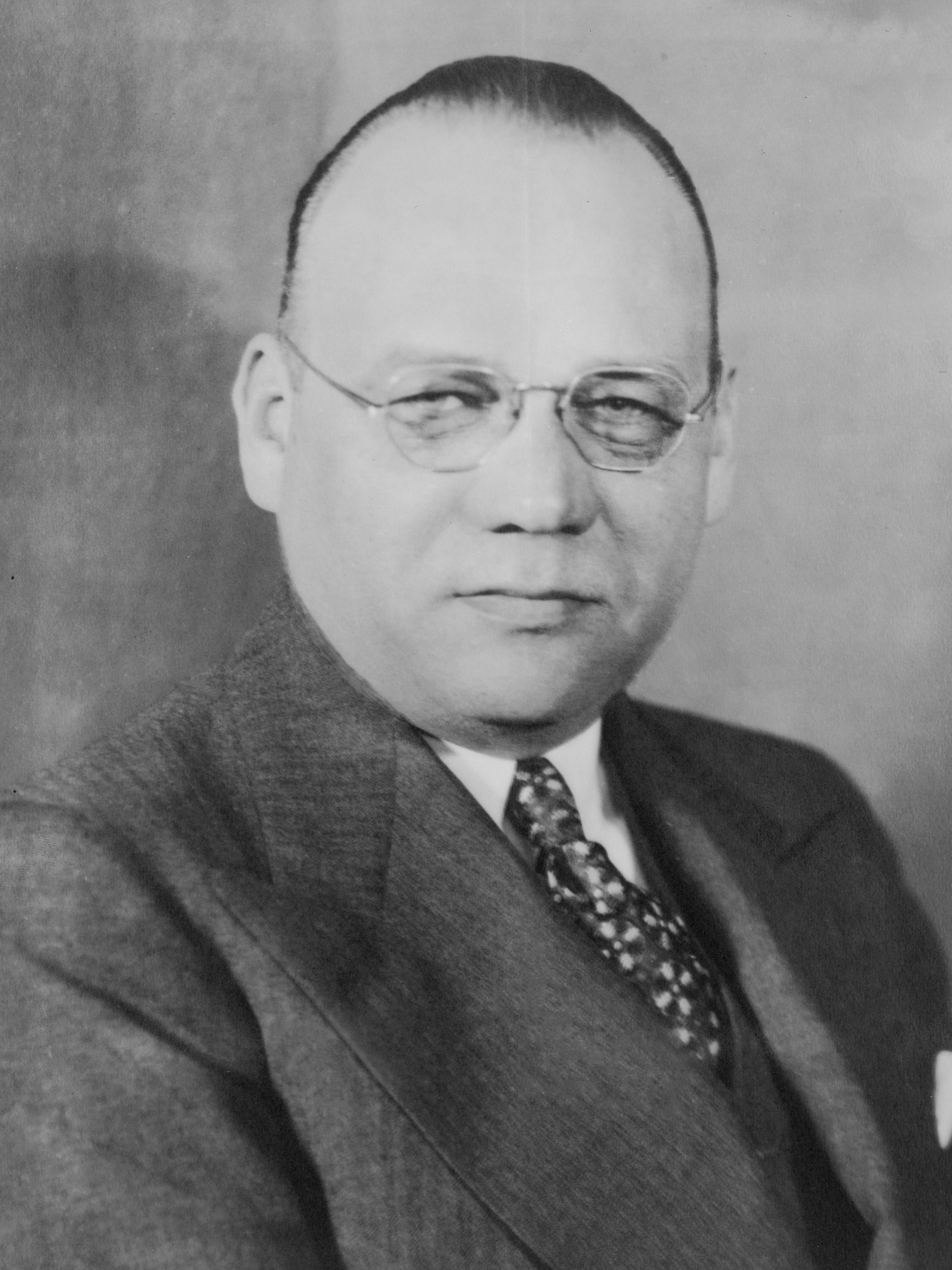
- Youngdahl c. 1939–1942

Member of the U.S. House of Representatives from Minnesota's 5th district
- In office January 3, 1939 – January 3, 1943
- Preceded by: Dewey Johnson
- Succeeded by: Walter Judd

Personal details
- Born: October 13, 1893 Minneapolis, Minnesota, U.S.
- Died: February 3, 1946 (aged 52) Minneapolis, Minnesota, U.S
- Resting place: Lakewood Cemetery
- Party: Republican
- Relatives: Luther Youngdahl (brother)
- Education: Gustavus Adolphus College; Minnesota College of Law

Military service
- Allegiance: United States of America
- Branch/service: United States Navy

Oscar Ferdinand Youngdahl (October 13, 1893 – February 3, 1946) was an American lawyer and politician from Minnesota. He was the older brother of Minnesota Governor and United States federal judge Luther Youngdahl.

Youngdahl was born in Minneapolis, Minnesota and attended local public schools. He began his undergraduate education at Hamline University in St. Paul, Minnesota, but ultimately graduated from Gustavus Adolphus College in St. Peter, Minnesota in 1916. Afterward, Youngdahl served as a high school principal in Ortonville, Minnesota, also doubling as the school's drama and public-speaking instructor. In 1918, he enlisted in the U.S. Navy and served until 1919, attaining the rank of Seaman Second Class. Changing career direction again, Youngdahl began selling bonds and securities in the Twin Cities while simultaneously attending law school. He graduated from William Mitchell College of Law (then the Minnesota College of Law) in 1925 and began practicing in Minneapolis. He unsuccessfully ran for state attorney general eleven years later.

Youngdahl resurrected his political career in 1938, when he was elected to the U.S. House of Representatives. He won reelection in 1940, but failed to receive his Republican Party's nomination in 1942. Returning to Minneapolis, he practiced law until his death in 1946. He was buried in Lakewood Cemetery.

Party political offices
Preceded by Henry N. Benson	Republican nominee for Attorney General of Minnesota; 1934, 1936	Succeeded by Joseph A. A. Burnquist
U.S. House of Representatives
Preceded by Dewey Johnson	U.S. Representative from Minnesota's 5th congressional district 1939–1943	Succeeded by Walter Judd
