= Moses E. Clapp =

American politician (1851–1929)

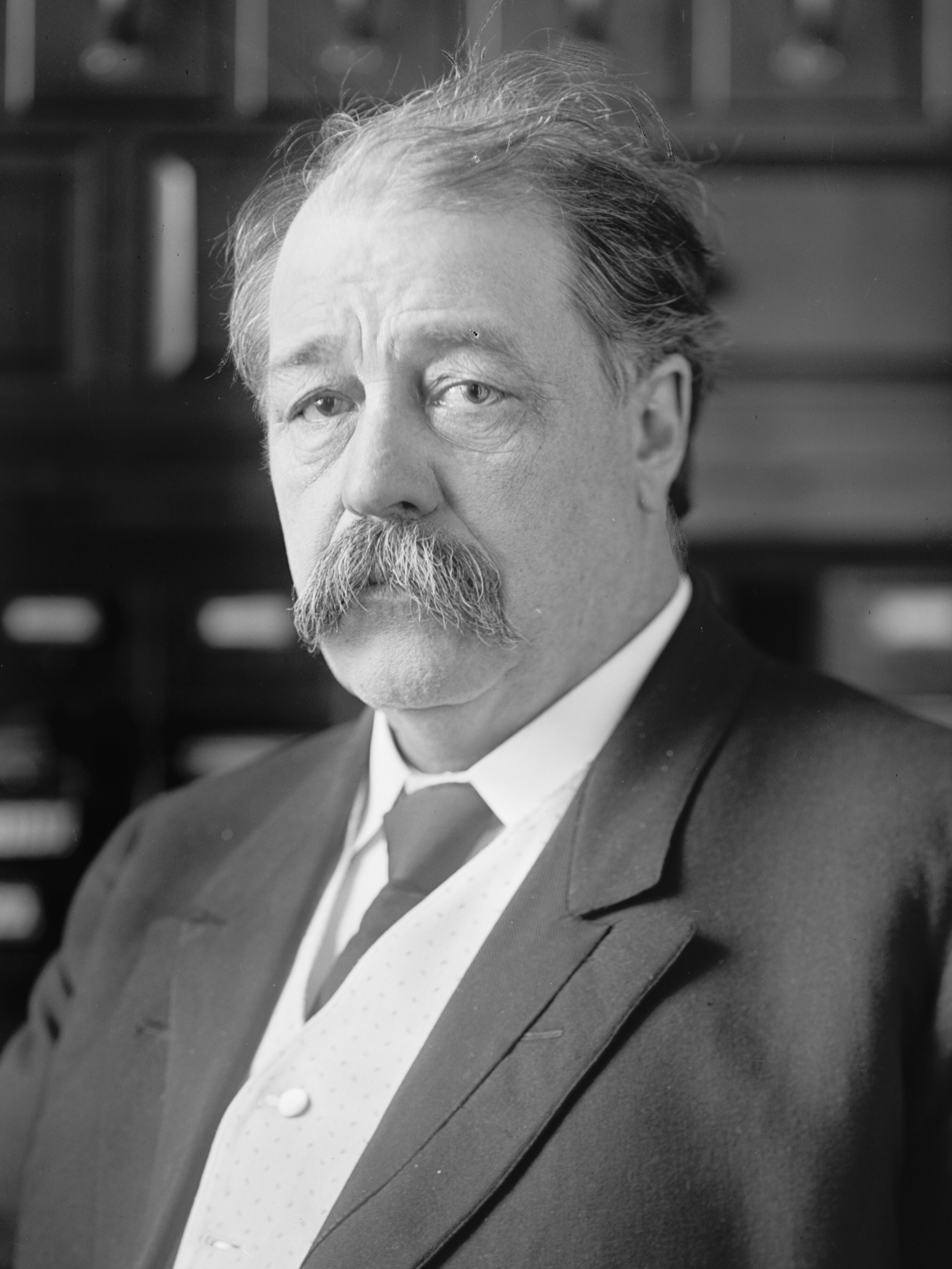
- Clapp, 1905–1929

United States Senator from Minnesota
- In office January 28, 1901 – March 3, 1917
- Preceded by: Charles A. Towne
- Succeeded by: Frank B. Kellogg

8th Minnesota Attorney General
- In office 1887–1893
- Governor: Andrew R. McGill; William R. Merriam
- Preceded by: William J. Hahn
- Succeeded by: Henry W. Childs

Personal details
- Born: May 21, 1851 Delphi, Indiana, US
- Died: March 6, 1929 (aged 77)
- Party: Republican
- Education: University of Wisconsin, Madison

Moses Edwin Clapp (May 21, 1851 – March 6, 1929) was an American lawyer and politician.

== Biography ==
Born in Delphi, Indiana, Clapp moved with his parents to Hudson, Wisconsin. He went to University of Wisconsin Law School and practiced law in Hudson, Wisconsin. He was district attorney for St. Croix County, Wisconsin. He then moved to Fergus Falls, Minnesota, where he practiced law.

He served as the Minnesota Attorney General from 1887 until 1893. In 1896 he would run for governor of Minnesota, but would lose the primary to incumbent David Marston Clough. In 1900, he entered the special election for Minnesota's seat in the United States Senate that was made vacant by the death of Cushman Davis. He won that election, and was later reelected in 1904 and 1910 for two additional terms.

He served in the Senate from January 28, 1901, to March 3, 1917, a term that spanned the 57th, 58th, 59th, 60th, 61st, 62nd, 63rd, and 64th Congresses. He was not renominated by the party in 1916. Clapp, along with Hiram F. Stevens, Ambrose Tighe, Thomas D. O'Brien, and Clarence Halbert, was also a co-founder of William Mitchell College of Law.

In 1906, he presented A Brief History of the Delaware Indians by Richard C. Adams for publication to the 59th Congress.

In 1908 he delivered a thank you letter from President Roosevelt to Chief May-zhuc-ke-ge-shig.

Legal offices
| Preceded by William J. Hahn | Minnesota Attorney General; 1887–1893 | Succeeded by Henry W. Childs |
U.S. Senate
| Preceded by Charles A. Towne | U.S. senator (Class 1) from Minnesota; 1901–1917; Served alongside: Knute Nelson | Succeeded by Frank B. Kellogg |
