= Lefkowitz v. Great Minneapolis Surplus Store, Inc =

1957 American contract law case

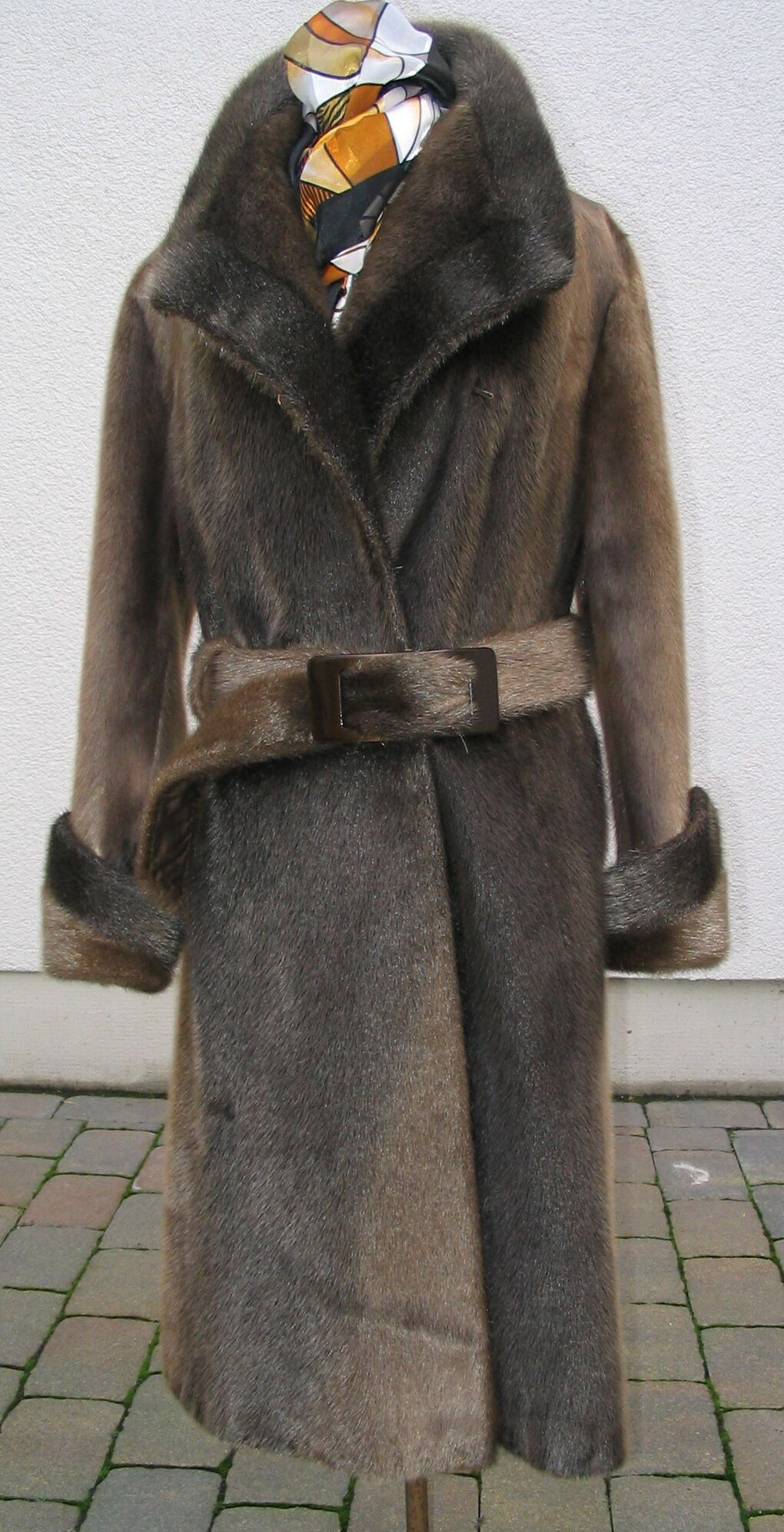
- Court: Supreme Court of Minnesota
- Citations: 86 NW 2d 689 (Minn, 1957)

Court membership
- Judge sitting: Justice Murphy

Keywords
- invitation to treat

Lefkowitz v. Great Minneapolis Surplus Store, Inc 86 NW 2d 689 (Minn, 1957) is an American contract law case. It concerns the distinction between an offer and an invitation to deal. The case held that a clear, definite, explicit and non-negotiable advertisement constitutes an offer, acceptance of which creates a binding contract. Furthermore, it held that an advertisement which did not clarify the terms of its bargains, such as with fine print, could not then be modified with arbitrary house rules.

== Facts ==
Great Minneapolis Surplus Store published an advertisement that said:

Saturday 9 A.M. Sharp 3 Brand New Fur Coats Worth to $100.00. First Come First Served $1 Each.

On April 13, they published another advertisement in the same newspaper, as follows.

Saturday 9 A.M. 2 Brand New Pastel Mink 3-Skin Scarfs Selling for $89.50 Out they go Saturday. Each ... $1.00 1 Black Lapin Stole Beautiful, worth $139.50 ... $1.00

First Come First Served

Mr. Lefkowitz was the first person to come on the Saturday after seeing the advertisement. He said he was ready to pay $1. But each time the store owner refused to sell, saying there was a "house rule" that it was for women only. The same advertisement was published the next week, and he arrived again. He was told that he knew the house rules and he would not get the coat.

== Judgment ==
Justice William P. Murphy held that the advertisement constituted an offer, which could not be withdrawn. He described the facts and gave his decision as follows.

The trial court properly disallowed plaintiff's claim for the value of the fur coats since the value of these articles was speculative and uncertain. The only evidence of value was the advertisement itself to the effect that the coats were "Worth to $100.00," how much less being speculative especially in view of the price for which they were offered for sale. With reference to the offer of the defendant on April 13, 1956, to sell the "1 Black Lapin Stole ... worth $139.50" the trial court held that the value of this article was established and granted judgment in favor of the plaintiff for that amount less the $1 quoted purchase price.

The defendant contends that a newspaper advertisement offering items of merchandise for sale at a named price is a "unilateral offer" which may be withdrawn without notice. He relies upon authorities which hold that, where an advertiser publishes in a newspaper that he has a certain quantity or quality of goods which he wants to dispose of at certain prices and on certain terms, such advertisements are not offers which become contracts as soon as any person to whose notice they may come signifies his acceptance by notifying the other that he will take a certain quantity of them. Such advertisements have been construed as an invitation for an offer of sale on the terms stated, which offer, when received, may be accepted or rejected and which therefore does not become a contract of sale until accepted by the seller; and until a contract has been so made, the seller may modify or revoke such prices or terms. Montgomery Ward & Co. v. Johnson, 95 N.E. 290 (Mass. 1911); Nickel v. Theresa Farmers Co-op. Ass'n, 20 N.W.2d 117 (Wis. 1945); Lovett v. Frederick Loeser & Co., 207 N.Y.S. 753 (N.Y. Mun. Ct. 1924); Schenectady Stove Co. v. Holbrook, 4 N.E. 4 (N.Y. 1885); Georgian Co. v. Bloom, 108 S.E. 813 (Ga. Ct. App. 1921); Craft v. Elder & Johnson Co., 38 N.E.2d 416 (Ohio Ct. App. 1941).

The defendant relies principally on Craft v. Elder & Johnston Co., supra. In that case, the court discussed the legal effect of an advertisement offering for sale, as a one-day special, an electric sewing machine at a named price. The view was expressed that the advertisement was "not an offer made to any specific person but was made to the public generally. Thereby it would be properly designated as a unilateral offer and not being supported by any consideration could be withdrawn at will and without notice." It is true that such an offer may be withdrawn before acceptance. Since all offers are by their nature unilateral because they are necessarily made by one party or on one side in the negotiation of a contract, the distinction made in that decision between a unilateral offer and a unilateral contract is not clear. On the facts before us we are concerned with whether the advertisement constituted an offer, and, if so, whether the plaintiff's conduct constituted an acceptance.

There are numerous authorities which hold that a particular advertisement in a newspaper or circular letter relating to a sale of articles may be construed by the court as constituting an offer, acceptance of which would complete a contract. J.E. Pinkham Lumber Co. v. C.W. Griffin & Co., 102 So. 689 (Ala. 1925); Seymour v. Armstrong & Kassebaum, 64 P. 612 (Kan. 1901); Payne v. Lautz Bros. & Co., 166 N.Y.S. 844 (N.Y. City Ct. 1916), aff'd, 168 N.Y.S. 369 (N.Y. Sup. Ct.), aff'd, 171 N.Y.S. 1094 (N.Y. App. Div. 1918); Arnold v. Phillips, 1 Ohio Dec. Reprint 195 (Ohio Ct. Common Pl. 1846); Oliver v. Henley, 21 S.W.2d 576 (Tex. Civ. App. 1929). The test of whether a binding obligation may originate in advertisements addressed to the general public is "whether the facts show that some performance was promised in positive terms in return for something requested." 1 WILLISTON, CONTRACTS § 27 (Rev. ed. 1936).

The authorities above cited emphasize that, where the offer is clear, definite, and explicit, and leaves nothing open for negotiation, it constitutes an offer, acceptance of which will complete the contract. The most recent case on the subject is Johnson v. Capital City Ford Co., 85 So. 2d 75 (La. Ct. App. 1955), in which the court pointed out that a newspaper advertisement relating to the purchase and sale of automobiles may constitute an offer, acceptance of which will consummate a contract and create an obligation in the offeror to perform according to the terms of the published offer.

Whether in any individual instance a newspaper advertisement is an offer rather than an invitation to make an offer depends on the legal intention of the parties and the surrounding circumstances. We are of the view on the facts before us that the offer by the defendant of the sale of the Lapin fur was clear, definite, and explicit, and left nothing open for negotiation. The plaintiff having successfully managed to be the first one to appear at the seller's place of business to be served, as requested by the advertisement, and having offered the stated purchase price of the article, he was entitled to performance on the part of the defendant. We think the trial court was correct in holding that there was in the conduct of the parties a sufficient mutuality of obligation to constitute a contract of sale.

The defendant contends that the offer was modified by a "house rule" to the effect that only women were qualified to receive the bargains advertised. The advertisement contained no such restriction. This objection may be disposed of briefly by stating that, while an advertiser has the right at any time before acceptance to modify his offer, he does not have the right, after acceptance, to impose new or arbitrary conditions not contained in the published offer. Payne v. Lautz Bros. & Co., 166 N.Y.S. 844, 848 (N.Y. City Ct. 1916); Mooney v. Daily News Co., 133 N.W. 573 (Minn. 1911).

== See also ==
- English contract law
