= 1894 Minnesota Attorney General election =

- November 6, 1894
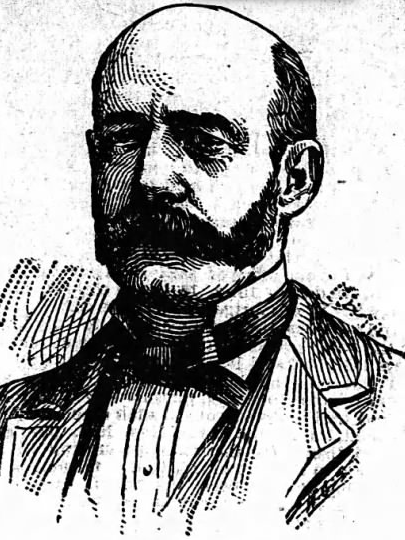

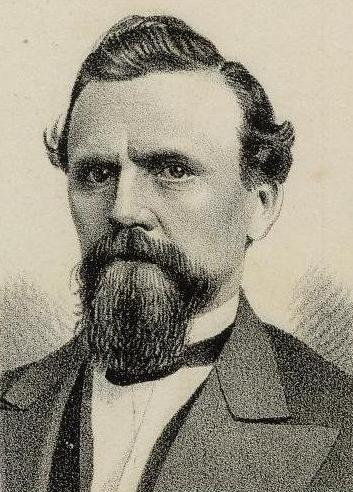
Nominee	Henry W. Childs	William Brackenridge	John L. MacDonald
Party	Republican	Democratic	Populist
Popular vote	150,529	66,905	60,265
Percentage	52.43%	23.30%	21.00%
Attorney General before election
Henry W. Childs
Republican
Elected Attorney General
Henry W. Childs
Republican

The 1894 Minnesota Attorney General election was held on November 6, 1894, in order to elect the attorney general of Minnesota. Republican nominee and incumbent attorney general Henry W. Childs defeated Democratic nominee William Brackenridge, People's nominee and former member of the U.S. House of Representatives from Minnesota's 3rd district John L. MacDonald and Prohibition nominee Robert Taylor.

== General election ==
On election day, November 6, 1894, Republican nominee Henry W. Childs won re-election by a margin of 83,624 votes against his foremost opponent Democratic nominee William Brackenridge, thereby retaining Republican control over the office of attorney general. Childs was sworn in for his second term on January 31, 1895.

=== Results ===
Minnesota Attorney General election, 1894
Party	Candidate	Votes	%
Republican	Henry W. Childs (incumbent)	150,529	52.43
Democratic	William Brackenridge	66,905	23.30
Populist	John L. MacDonald	60,265	21.00
Prohibition	Robert Taylor	9,400	3.27
Total votes		287,099	100.00
Republican hold			
