= John L. MacDonald =

American politician from Minnesota

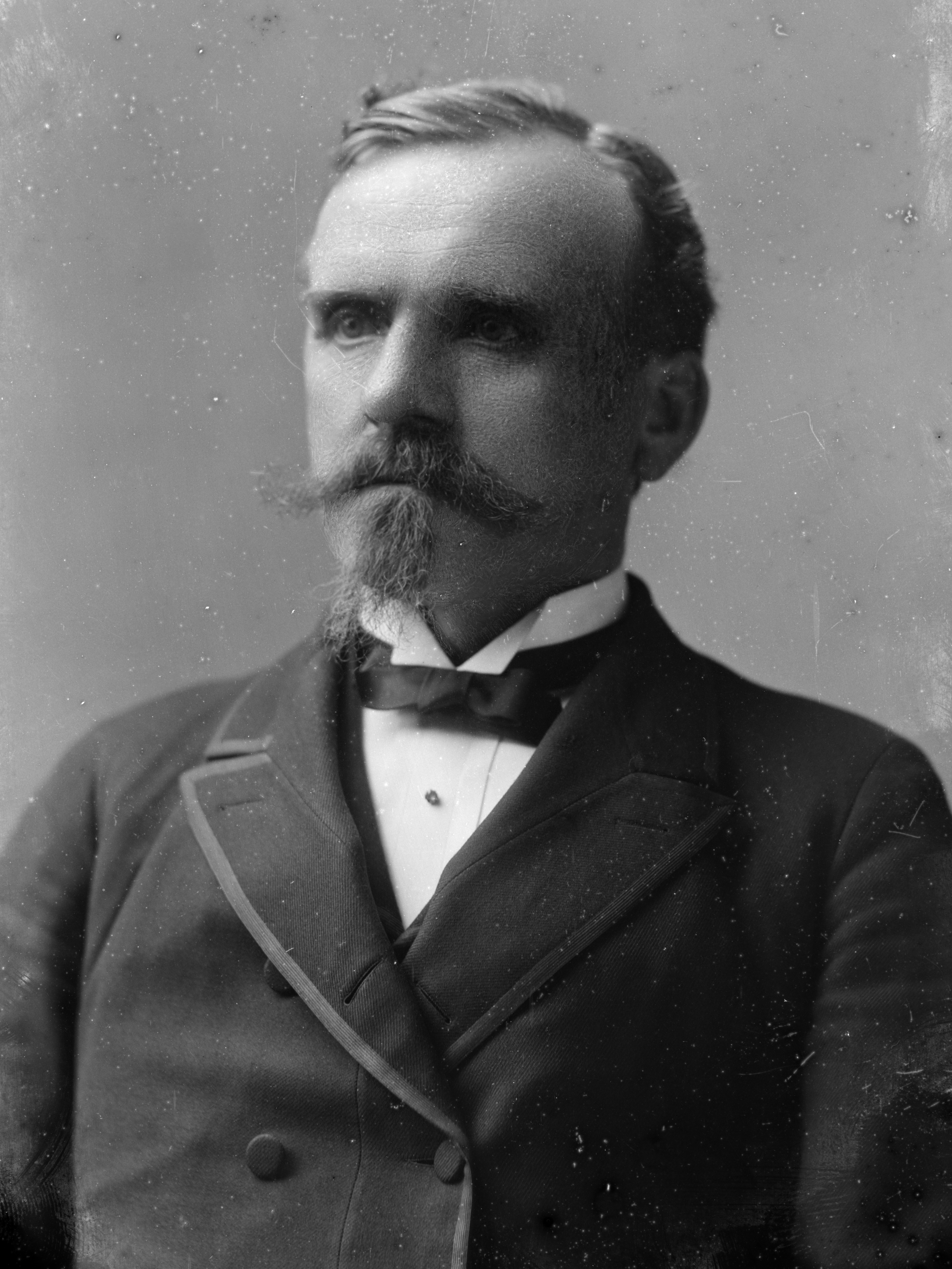

Member of the U.S. House of Representatives from Minnesota's 3rd district
- In office March 4, 1887 – March 3, 1889
- Preceded by: Horace B. Strait
- Succeeded by: Osee M. Hall

Member of the Minnesota Senate from the 21st district
- In office January 3, 1873 – January 1, 1877
- Preceded by: Robert H. Rose
- Succeeded by: William Henry

Member of the Minnesota Senate from the 18th district
- In office January 3, 1871 – January 1, 1872
- Preceded by: William Henry
- Succeeded by: George Washington Batchelder

Member of the Minnesota House of Representatives from the 18th district
- In office January 5, 1869 – January 2, 1871
- Preceded by: William Henry
- Succeeded by: W.V. Sencerbox

Personal details
- Born: John Louis MacDonald; February 22, 1838 Glasgow, Scotland
- Died: July 13, 1903 (aged 65) Kansas City, Missouri
- Party: Democratic
- Spouse: Mary Hennessy
- Occupation: Attorney

John Louis MacDonald (February 22, 1838 – July 13, 1903) was a United States representative from Minnesota and a member of the Democratic Party.

== Early life ==
MacDonald was born February 22, 1838, in Glasgow, Scotland. He immigrated to Nova Scotia, Canada, with his parents. In 1847, the family settled in Pittsburgh, Pennsylvania. They again moved in 1855, to Minnesota, and settled in Scott County, where MacDonald studied law.

== Legal career ==
MacDonald was admitted to the bar in 1859 and commenced practice at Belle Plaine, Minnesota. He served as a judge of the probate court of Scott County in 1860 and 1861. During the Civil War he was commissioned to enlist and muster volunteers for the Union Army. He also served as prosecuting attorney of Scott County in 1863 and 1864.

== Political career ==
MacDonald served as county superintendent of schools in 1865 and 1866. He was elected to the Minnesota House of Representatives, serving in 1869 and 1870; and then served in the Minnesota Senate in 1871 and from 1873 to 1876.

He ran unsuccessfully candidate for attorney general in 1872 on the Democratic ticket. He was then elected mayor of Shakopee in 1876. He was elected judge of the eighth judicial district of Minnesota in 1876 for a term of seven years and reelected without opposition in 1883.

In 1886, he was elected as a Democrat to the 50th congress; he subsequently resigned as judge. He served in Congress from March 4, 1887, to March 3, 1889. He ran again in 1888, but lost. He subsequently returned to being a lawyer in Saint Paul, Minnesota. In 1894, he unsuccessfully ran for Minnesota Attorney General as a Populist. In 1898, he moved to Kansas City, Missouri, where he continued to practice law.

== Death ==
MacDonald died from heart disease at his home in Kansas City on July 13, 1903. He was working as a lawyer until his death. He was buried at St. Mary's Cemetery in Kansas City.

U.S. House of Representatives
| Preceded by Horace B. Strait | U.S. Representative from Minnesota's 3rd congressional district 1887 – 1889 | Succeeded by Darwin Hall |
