= William B. Mitchell =

American judge

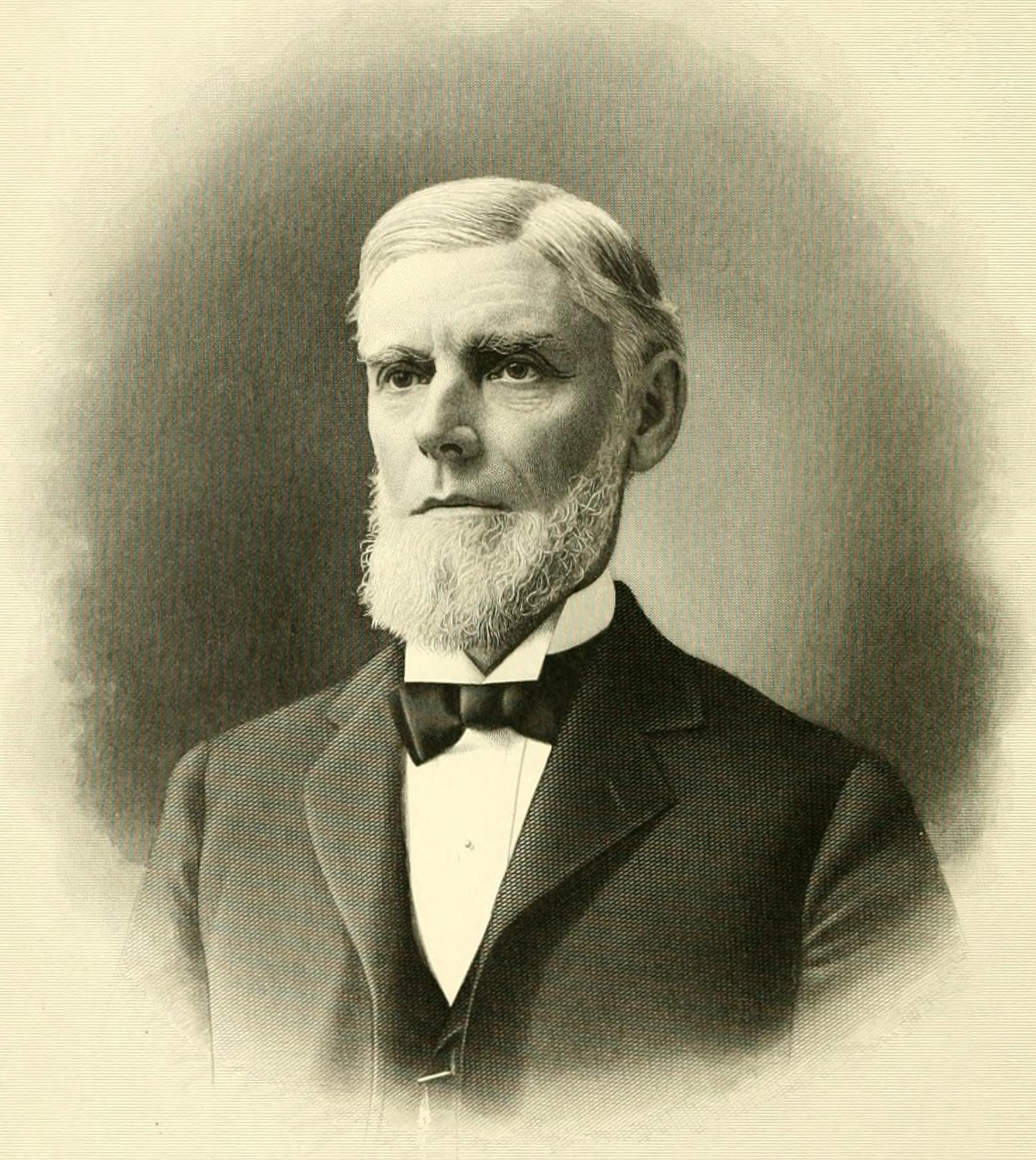
- William Mitchell, c. 1890s

Associate Justice of the Minnesota Supreme Court
- In office 1881–1900
- Appointed by: John S. Pillsbury
- Preceded by: None (new seat)
- Succeeded by: Calvin L. Brown

Member of the Minnesota House of Representatives for the 11th Legislative District
- In office December 7, 1859 – January 7, 1861

Personal details
- Born: November 19, 1832 Stamford, Ontario
- Died: August 21, 1900 (aged 67) Miltona, Minnesota
- Spouses: Jane Hanway (m. 1857; died 1867) Frances M. Smith (m. 1872; died 1891)
- Children: William D. Mitchell

William Mitchell (November 19, 1832 – August 21, 1900) was a lawyer and judge notable for his work in Minnesota as a member of the 3rd Minnesota District Court and Minnesota Supreme Court. He was also the first dean of the St. Paul College of Law, later renamed in his honor as the William Mitchell College of Law.

== Early life ==
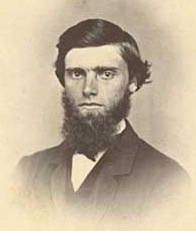
Mitchell, c. 1860

Mitchell was born in Stamford, Ontario in 1832. His parents John Mitchell and Mary Henderson were both Scottish immigrants. He attended Jefferson College in Pennsylvania and while there he befriended Eugene McLanahan Wilson. After graduating in 1853, he became a school teacher in Morgantown, West Virginia and began to read law under his friend's father Edgar C. Wilson. He was admitted to the bar in 1857.

Mitchell relocated to Winona, Minnesota with Eugene McLanahan Wilson shortly after passing the bar. He began to practice law there and partnered at various points with Wilson, Daniel Sheldon Norton, William H. Yale, Thomas Wilson and William Windom. In 1859 he was elected to the Minnesota House of Representatives for one term. He also served one term as attorney for Winona County, Minnesota.

== Judicial career ==
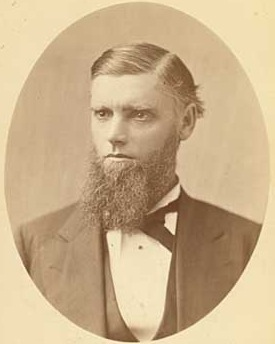
Mitchell, c. 1870

In 1874, Mitchell was elected to the 3rd Minnesota District Court. In 1877, Mitchell was called upon to serve on the Minnesota Supreme Court pro hac vice to hear a case where two of the sitting justices were involved as counsel. He was re-elected to a second term as district court judge in 1880 and was appointed to the Minnesota Supreme Court as an associate justice by Governor John S. Pillsbury in 1881 after the court was expanded from three members to five. Mitchell won bipartisan support from both the Republican and Democratic parties in 1886 and 1892. In 1898, Mitchell gained the nomination of the Democratic party but not the Republican party and was defeated.

At one point, President Benjamin Harrison nominated Mitchell for an open seat on the Eighth Circuit Court of Appeals, but he eventually withdrew from consideration. After it was incorporated into the U.S. as a protectorate, Mitchell was offered the position of Chief Justice of the Supreme Court of Puerto Rico but he declined.

== Personal life ==
Mitchell married Jane Hanway in Morgantown, West Virginia in September 1857. She and Mitchell had two daughters before she died in 1867. In 1872, Mitchell remarried to Frances M. Smith of Chicago, Illinois. The two had a son, William D. Mitchell, who also pursued a legal career and went on to serve as Solicitor General of the United States and United States Attorney General. Smith died in 1891.

Mitchell was raised Presbyterian.

== Later life and death ==
In 1900, Mitchell was selected as the first dean of the newly founded St. Paul College of Law. Mitchell died that same year, before he was able to begin his work. He suffered a stroke while fishing in Miltona on August 21. He is buried at Woodlawn Cemetery in Winona, Minnesota.

== Legacy ==
In his eighteen years on the court, Mitchell wrote more than 1,500 opinions touching on all areas of Minnesota state law. In a letter to a friend in Minnesota, renowned Harvard Law Professor James Bradley Thayer wrote:

I have long recognized Judge Mitchell as one of the best judges in this country, and have come to know also the opinion held of him by lawyers competent to pass on an opinion on such a question ... Pray do not allow your state to lose the services of such a man. To keep him on the bench is a service not merely to Minnesota, but to the whole country and to the law. Your state it is that is now on trial before the country. The question is: Can Minnesota appreciate such a man? Is it worthy to have him? I am not going to believe that a state which can command the services of one of the few judges in the country that stand out among their fellows as pre-eminent, that give it distinction, will refuse to accept these services.

When the St. Paul College of Law merged with the Minneapolis-Minnesota College of Law in 1956, the combined school was renamed the William Mitchell College of Law in his honor.
