= 13th Minnesota Infantry Regiment =

13th Minnesota Volunteer Infantry Regiment
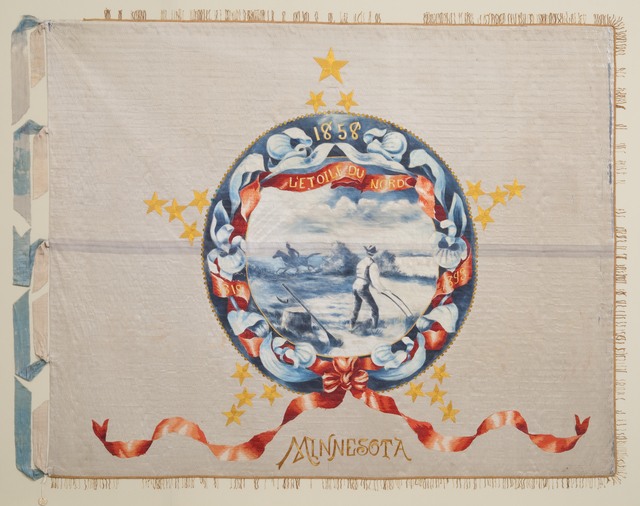
- 13th Minnesota Infantry Regimental Flag 1898-1899
- Active: April 29, 1898 – October 3, 1899
- Country: United States
- Branch: United States Volunteers
- Type: Infantry
- Size: Regiment (Three Battalions, 12 Companies); 1,029 (Muster In); 1,003 (Muster Out)
- Engagements: Spanish-American War; Battle of Manila 1898; Philippine–American War; Second Battle of Caloocan; Capture of Malolos; Luzon Expedition

Commanders
- Notable commanders: Colonel Charles McCormick Reeve; Colonel Frederick William Ames

The 13th Minnesota Infantry Regiment was a United States volunteer infantry regiment active during the Spanish–American War and Philippine–American War. It's most well known for the role it played during the Battle of Manila as well as its efforts against Filipino resistance throughout 1899. It was one of four Minnesota regiments raised for the Spanish-American War and the only one to see combat.

== History ==
=== Organization and early service ===
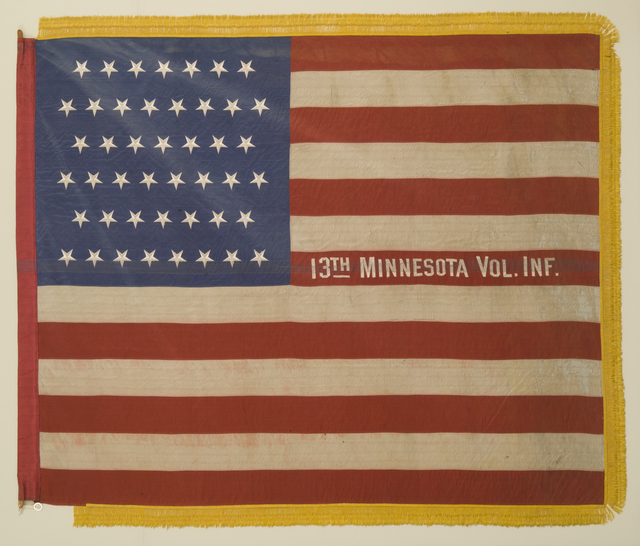
13th Minnesota National Flag 1898–1899

Officers of the 13th Minnesota Regiment

Prior to its federalization, the 13th Minnesota Infantry Regiment was originally designated as the 1st Regiment of the Minnesota National Guard.^{:7} At the outbreak of the Spanish–American War in the Spring of 1898, President William McKinley authorized the raising of Volunteers from each U.S. state. Minnesota initially raised three regiments from the Minnesota National Guard on April 25, 1898; the First, Second, and Third regiments were federalized into the 12th, 13th, and 14th Minnesota Infantry regiments. Each regiment was filled by May 7. All three Minnesota regiments counted 12 companies each recruited from various Minnesota cities organized into three battalions.

Companies A, B, F, I, and L of the 13th Minnesota were recruited from Minneapolis.^{:46} Companies C, D, E, and H were recruited from St. Paul.^{:46} Company G was from Red Wing, company K was from Stillwater, and company M from St. Cloud.^{:46} Colonel Charles McCormick Reeve would initially command the regiment, commanding a total of 50 officers and 979 men.^{:46}

The regiment was organized as follows:^{:201}

Company	Primary place of recruitment	Captain
A	Minneapolis	William McWade
B	Minneapolis	Arthur M. Diggles
C	St. Paul	Clarence G. Bunker
D	St. Paul	Charles E. Metz
E	St. Paul	
F	Minneapolis	William A. Carelton
G	Red Wing	Oscar Seebach
H	St. Paul	Alfred William Bjornstad
I	Minneapolis	Frank T. Corriston
K	Stillwater	Edwin M. Conrad
L	Minneapolis	Alfred S. Morgan
M	St. Cloud	James E. McKelvy

On May 12, the 13th Minnesota was finally ordered to the Philippines where they were to take part in the Manila expedition. Their cousin regiments, the 12th and 14th, were sent to training camps in the south. From May–June, the 13th trained at Camp Merritt, California. By late June, their training was complete; on June 26, the men arrived in San Francisco where they boarded the City of Para for their voyage to the Philippines. For many of the men, it was their first time seeing the Ocean and traveling on its waters. Many became seasick and ill from the effects of poor food and lack of water. A three-day stop in Hawaii, however, kept the men refreshed for the rest of the voyage.

=== Arrival in the Philippines ===
A month later, on July 31, the soldiers arrived seven miles south of Manila off the Province of Cavite much to their relief, however, a monsoon prevented disembarkation until August 7. After establishing a camp, the Minnesotans were finally ordered to join Major General Arthur MacArthur for the expedition on Manila.

=== Battle of Manila (1898) ===
Manila had already been the scene of major U.S. operations during the early weeks of the Spanish-American War. On May 1, Admiral George Dewey's Asiatic Squadron soundly defeated Patricio Montojo's Pacific Squadron with minimal loss, allowing the Americans to blockade it. However, a garrison of 10,000 Spanish troops still defended the city. When negotiations for surrender diminished, MacArthur resolved to capture the city by force.

Under their new Commander, the 13th Minnesota would take its place on the right flank of the army alongside the 23rd U.S. Infantry. During the course of the action, the right flank quickly became the most embattled. The 23rd U.S. had halted, leaving the Minnesotans to advance alone. The Spanish 73rd Infantry Regiment opposed the Minnesotans with stubborn resistance and inflicted 23 casualties on the 13th Minnesota, more than any other regiment engaged at Manila. Captain Oscar Seebach of Company G deployed his men along an open road; the men fired, took cover, and reloaded to shoot again. Cpt. Seebach would be the highest-ranking Minnesota casualty of the day with a gunshot piercing his lungs and knocking him out. Eventually, the Spanish were driven from their defensive positions. The battle would be decided as a major U.S. victory. After the battle, the Minnesotans were placed on Police Duty. The day before the assault, hostilities between Spain and the United States had formally ceased.

== Philippine-American War ==
=== Second Battle of Caloocan (or Second Battle of Manila) (1899) ===
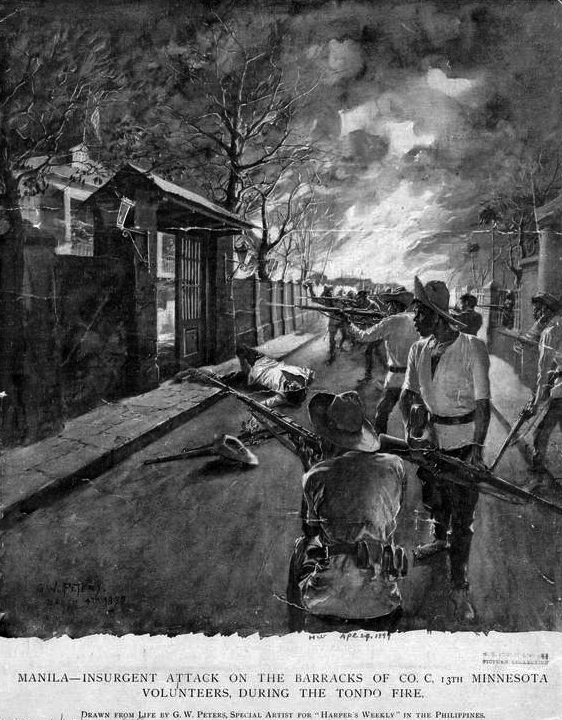
Filipino insurgents attack the barracks of Company C, 13th Minnesota

To the dismay of the regiment, they would not be going home. Instead, after increasing tensions, hostilities broke out between American and Filipino Insurrectionists. A second war in the Philippines had begun. The Minnesotans grew tired of the mundane life of police duty, requesting to be sent to the front. But yet again, some of the regiment found itself fighting in Manila. Filipino rebels attacked the city with the heaviest fighting occurring in the Tondo district. Much of the district was set ablaze, and companies C and M found themselves fighting for their lives against large numbers of insurrectionists. The Minnesotans held their ground and drove the Filipinos out of Tondo.

=== Luzon Expedition 1899 ===
After their second fight in Manila, the regiment was placed under the command of Maj. Gen Henry Ware Lawton for the coming expedition to the Luzon region, where they would be tasked with the capture of all the important towns in the area. The 13th Minnesota would provide two battalions for the campaign while one remained behind. The Minnesotans covered 100-120 miles in 33 days, capturing 28 towns and destroying Filipino supplies.

=== Mustering out ===
Parade honoring the return of the 13th Minnesota Infantry from the Philippine Insurrection

The men of the 13th Minnesota had been serving longer than they expected and requested to return home. On August 10, these wishes were finally granted as they finally left the Philippines that day. The regiment stayed together until 12 October 1899 when it reached St. Paul, Minnesota. They received a warm welcome by thousands, including president McKinley.

== Casualties ==
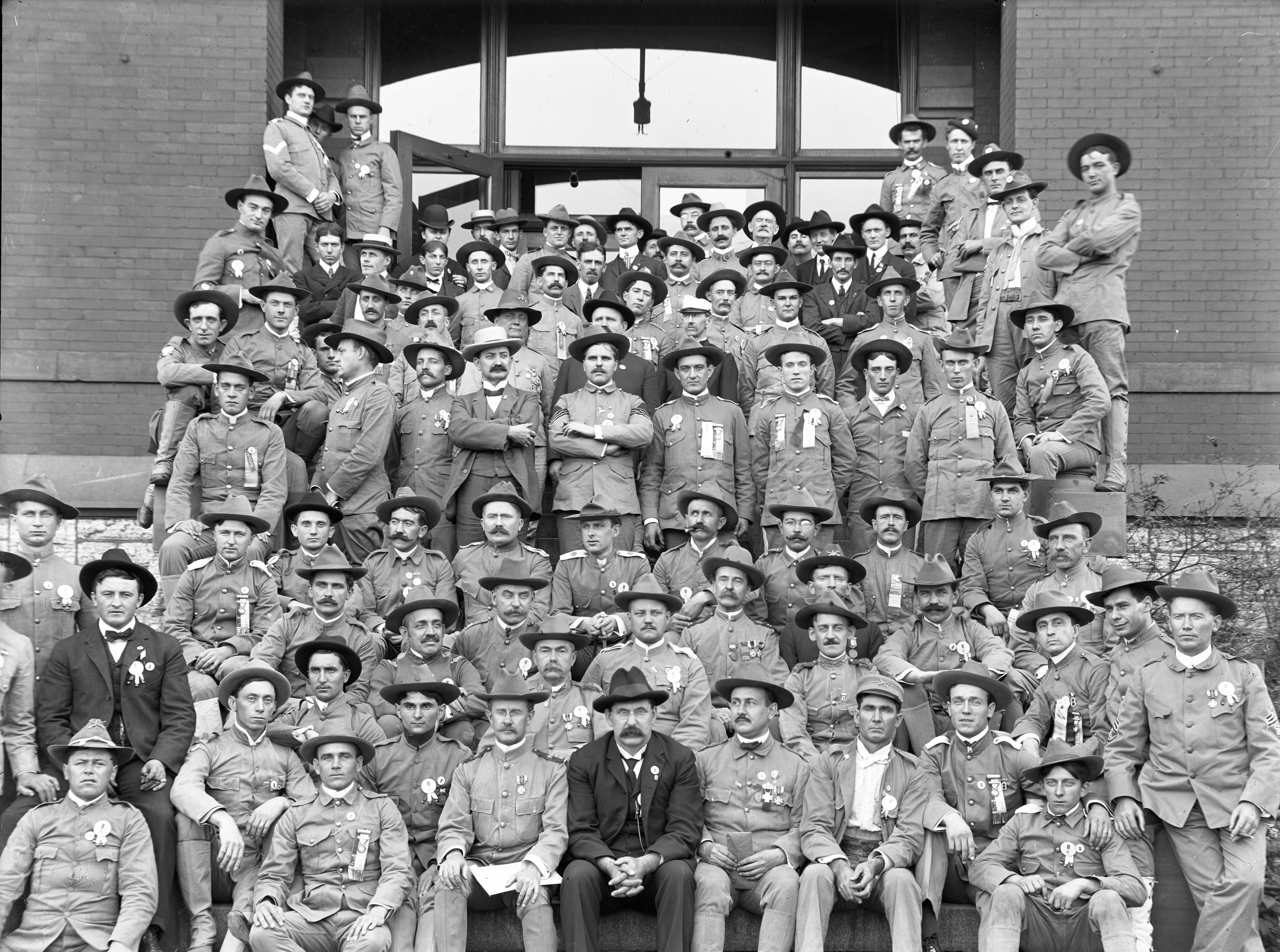
13th Minnesota Volunteer Infantry veterans of the Philippine-American War on the steps of the Capitol (1903)

The 13th Minnesota mustered out with 51 officers and 952 men. Four enlisted men were killed, six officers and 68 men were wounded in action (one officer and two men died of wounds), one man drowned, and one officer and 33 enlisted men died of disease for a total of 118 casualties.

The Hennepin History Museum in Minneapolis, Minnesota suggests 44 killed and 74 wounded during the regiments' time in service.

== Commanders ==
- Colonel Frederick William Ames.^{:198}
- Colonel Charles McCormick Reeve.^{:198}
- Lieutenant Colonel John H. Frederick.^{:198}
- Lieutenant Colonel Wescott Price.^{:198}
- Major Edwin Bean.^{:198}
- Major Arthur M. Diggles.^{:198}
- Major Joseph P. Masterman.^{:198}
- Major Noyes C. Robinson.^{:198}

== Notable people ==
- Alfred William Bjornstad: Bjornstad served as the Captain of company H.^{:252}
- Carl Nathorst: Originally served as a Corporal in Company D of the 13th Minnesota.^{:224}
- Ulysses G. McAlexander: Served with the 13th Minnesota during the Philippine insurrection.
- Oscar Seebach: Served as the Captain of Company G, wounded at the Battle of Manila.^{:51}

== Continued lineage ==
Company C, the "St. Paul Guards" of the 13th Minnesota traces its lineage back to the 1st Minnesota Volunteer Infantry of the Civil War.^{:9} The second battalion, 135th Infantry Regiment, Minnesota National Guard, traces its origins from these two units.

== Sources ==
Ward, Kyle The 13th Minnesota Volunteer Infantry Retrieved 2024-08-11

Johnson, Frederick L. Thirteenth Minnesota and the Battle for Manila Retrieved 2024-08-11

- 13th Minnesota Volunteer Infantry, Company B Last Man Club Collection, hennepinhistory.org Hennepin History Museum Retrieved 2024-08-16
