= Henry Z. Hayner =

American lawyer

The Honourable Henry Z. Hayner

3rd Chief Justice of the Minnesota Territorial Supreme Court
- In office August 1852 – April 1853 Serving with Jerome Fuller
- Appointed by: Millard Fillmore
- Preceded by: Aaron Goodrich
- Succeeded by: William H. Welch

Personal details
- Born: September 18, 1802 Brunswick, New York, USA
- Died: March 1874 (aged 71) New York City, New York, USA
- Cause of death: Bright's disease
- Education: Yale University

Military service
- Allegiance: United States of America; Union
- Branch/service: United States Army; Union Army
- Rank: Major
- Battles/wars: American Civil War

Henry Zachariah Hayner (September 18, 1802 – March 1874) was a lawyer, member of the New York State Assembly (1846) and chief justice of the Minnesota Territorial Supreme Court (1852–1853).

== Life and career ==
Hayner was born in Brunswick, New York in 1802 to Zachariah and Eve Hayner (née Clum). He studied at the Hopkins Academy in Hadley, Massachusetts before enrolling at Yale University, graduating in 1826. He then moved to Troy, New York where he read law and was admitted to the bar in 1830. In 1846 he represented Rensselaer County, New York in the 69th New York State Legislature.

In August 1852 President Millard Fillmore nominated Hayner to the post of Chief Justice of the Minnesota Territorial Supreme Court after his recess appointment of Jerome Fuller expired. Hayner's nomination was promptly approved and he left for the Minnesota Territory. When he arrived in October 1852 it was too late to begin the fall term of the court leaving Hayner with little work to do. In April 1853 he was replaced when the newly elected President Franklin Pierce nominated William H. Welch to the position.

Hayner returned to New York and started a law practice in New York City. At the outbreak of the American Civil War he was commissioned as a Major and served on the staff of General John E. Wool and later as a Provost Marshal in Baltimore, Maryland and in New York City. After the war he pursued some mining interests in the western states and territories before falling ill and returning to New York City.

Hayner died in March 1874 from bright's disease in New York City.
