= Government of Saginaw, Michigan =

The Government of Saginaw, Michigan is a council-manager form of government with a mayor selected from members of the city council by members of the city council. Saginaw is classified as a home rule city under the Michigan Home Rule Cities Act which permits cities to exercise "home rule" powers, among which is the power to frame and adopt its own city charter which serves as the fundamental law of the city, in a manner similar to a constitution for a national or state government. The present charter was adopted in 1935 and took effect on January 6, 1936.

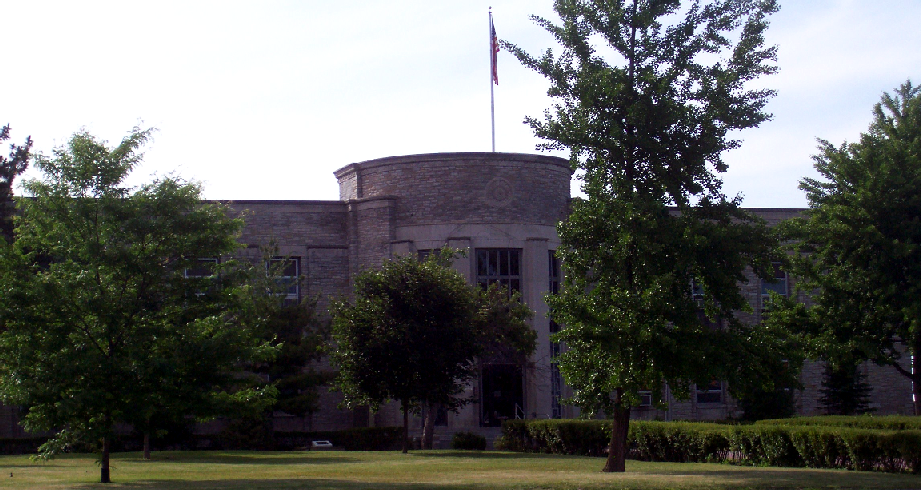
Saginaw's City Hall, completed in 1936 built of limestone and Indiana Rock

== History ==
On June 28, 1889, the Michigan Legislature passed Act 455 to consolidate the City of Saginaw and the City of East Saginaw into a new city that also was named the City of Saginaw. The early government was fraught with geographic rivalries due to the forced merger of the two cities. Distrust between both sides led to 21 wards to be created each electing two aldermen to the city council and a mayor to be elected at large for a city with a population of approximately 42,323 at the time. After years of dysfunctional government, the citizens of the city changed the government to have five wards with a single member of the council elected from each ward. Each council person ran a specific department of the city: public works; finance; parks and cemeteries; health and safety; and water and sewer.

== Current government ==
The current government was formed in 1936 in response to allegations of corruption of the heads of each department. In order to resemble a more business like structure, voters in 1935 approved a change to a council-manager form of government in which council members are elected by the people and a mayor is elected by the council from its ranks.

=== City Council ===
Pursuant to the city charter, Saginaw is governed by a nine-member elected at-large Council. The term of office for a member of the city council is four years commencing with the first meeting following a regular municipal election. The terms of council members are staggered so that the entire council is not subject to re-election at the same time; alternatively either four or five members are elected in each even-numbered year.

=== Mayor and mayor pro-tempore ===
The members of the council select one of its own members to serve as mayor for a two-year term. The mayor is chosen at the first meeting following a regular municipal election and a mayor pro-tempore (usually simply called "mayor pro-tem") at the same time. The mayor's principal function is to preside at meetings of the city council. The mayor has the prerogative to make some appointments to various boards and commissions, and otherwise serves in a ceremonial role. .

=== City manager ===
Actual executive power is vested in a city manager, who is a city employee appointed by the city council. The present city manager is Tim Morales, appointed in October 2013. He had previously served as deputy city manager and CFO under previous manager Darnell Earley, who vacated the position to become emergency financial manager for Flint, Michigan. Earley was selected by the City Council at its June 5, 2006 meeting after serving as interim city manager since September 2005 after the previous officeholder, Cecil Collins, was removed from office by the city council.

== Politics ==
=== City charter revision ===
In August 2007, Saginaw voters rejected a proposed Saginaw city charter revision by a 5,761 to 1,082 margin.

==== Election ====
Under the provisions of the Home Rule Cities Act, the voters of the city elected a nine-member Charter Revision Commission on November 2, 2004. The commissioners begun their three-year term of office on November 16, 2004. If the body fails to complete its task during this time it will automatically dissolve. This commission has the power to frame a new city charter and submit it for adoption or rejection by the voters. During the campaign for electing the commission, the major issues included the stability of the city manager form of government for the city. Earlier in the same year, city manager Deborah Kimble had been removed from office by the city council under contentious circumstances after having only served for 18 months. Ethnic and Racial division on the city council that led to the office of mayor having been held for eight years by Gary L. Loster, an African-American, followed by Wilmer Jones Ham, also an African-American, for four years fueled a push by the main proponents for charter revision for having the mayor of Saginaw directly elected by the voters rather than the city council. Other prominent issues were a desire to have the council elected by wards rather than from the city at-large and increased efficiency and accountability in city government. Much of the latter issue was prompted by well-publicized reports of mismanagement of money by certain city officials. The leading proponents of charter revision in the election were the father and son duo of Allen C. Schmid and Gregory C. Schmid, both attorneys.

==== Process ====
The commission's chairwoman was Susan Carter who previously had served as a member of the city council and mayor pro tempore. A majority of the commission consisted of members who strongly favored a revision of a charter rather than a more conservative process of amending the current charter. At its January 9, 2007 meeting the commission formally adopted a proposed charter. The proposed revision provided for a Mayor elected directly by the voters who would assume a full-time administrative role in city government. The office of city manager would have been retained under the proposed charter but assume a bit of a diminished role. The city council would have been elected from four wards, two from each ward, for four-year terms staggered so that half of the council will be elected at each city election. In addition, a ninth member of the council would have been elected by the city at-large; that member would have served as President of the city council. The compensation to be paid to council members and the mayor would have been substantially increased over the current levels. The proposed charter was submitted to the attorney general of the state of Michigan whose staff reviewed it and found 99 questionable issues with the document including some outright violations of law and released a report on March 2, 2007.

==== Current status ====
Michigan's governor Jennifer M. Granholm reviewed the proposed charter upon having received a report from the attorney general and returned it to the charter commission with her approval for being submitted to a vote of the city's electors. The proposal to be submitted to the voters is the second version presented for review by the attorney general, the first version was reviewed by the attorney general's staff and given a recommendation to reject. The charter commission subsequently revised the charter draft. Adoption of a revised version by the Commission was scheduled for April 19, 2007. The proposal was approved to be placed on a city-wide ballot at an election to take place on August 7, 2007. That proposal was rejected by the voters at the August 7, 2007 election, 5,761 to 1,082. The commission declined to place a revision on another ballot before its term ended on Nov. 16, 2007.

==== Controversies ====
The commission's proposal calls for combining the police and fire departments into a single public safety department. Under this plan, by the year 2020 all police officers will become fully trained and certified fire fighters and all fire fighters will become fully trained and certified police officers. All police and fire stations in the city will function as dual-purpose public safety stations.

The proposal also limits the ability for disciplined or terminated city employees to sue the city. The districts for the election of city council members each stretch across the city from the west to the east city limits containing territory of both the west side and east side. Because of the historical trend of lower voter turnout on the east side, it is argued by some that the districts could limit the representation for east side by ensuring the election of a council consisting of nearly all west side residents.

The revised charter proposal would pay the Mayor a full-time salary and the council members would be paid more. The plan has been criticized because of the City's present financial distress. The plan would consolidate the city's operations into seven departments. A controversial provision of the proposed charter is the creation of an office of ombudsman. According to the document, the ombudsman would have broad investigative powers. The review by the attorney general found some powers of the office to be illegal. One such example is the power to compel affidavits from those who aren't city employees. The ombudsman's office was especially criticized by the Police Officers Association of Michigan whose affiliate represents the police officers of the city of Saginaw.

== Budget and finance ==
A "cap" on property taxes was imposed in 1978 by means of an amendment to the city charter adopted by the voters, on both the method of imposing the tax and on the total amount that can be collected. Seven electoral attempts to lift the cap have failed, and the cap has forced the city to make its income tax the major source of general fund revenue. The cap, as well as stagnating and declining income tax revenue and cuts by the Michigan legislature to its shared revenue for municipalities, has left Saginaw, like many of Michigan's core cities, in a difficult financial position to provide services and pay for legacy costs such as pensions and retiree health benefits.
