= Oscar Seebach =

American politician

- Seebach c. 1917

Member of the Minnesota House of Representatives from the 19th District
- In office January 1, 1917 – January 5, 1919
- Governor: Joseph A. A. Burnquist

Assistant Adjutant General of Minnesota
- In office January 1, 1901 – January 1, 1905

Personal details
- Born: Oscar Edward Seebach; November 16, 1867 Racine, Wisconsin, U.S.
- Died: May 28, 1939 (aged 71) North Carolina, U.S.
- Resting place: Oakwood Cemetery; Red Wing, Minnesota, U.S.
- Education: University of Minnesota

Military service
- Branch/service: Minnesota National Guard
- Years of service: 1888–1904
- Rank: Major
- Unit: 13th Minnesota Infantry Regiment
- Commands: Company G, 13th Minnesota Infantry Regiment
- Battles/wars: Spanish-American War; Battle of Manila 1898 (WIA); Philippine–American War; Second Battle of Caloocan; Capture of Malolos; Luzon Expedition

Oscar Edward Seebach (November 16, 1867 – May 28, 1939) was an American businessman, soldier, and politician who served a single term in the Minnesota House of Representatives.

== Early life and education ==
Seebach was born on November 16, 1867 in Racine, Wisconsin.^{:456} Seebach's family moved to Goodhue County, Minnesota in 1868. Seebach was educated in Red Wing and later graduated from Red Wing High School before enrolling and graduating from the University of Minnesota.^{:456} Seebach worked in Red Wing as a door manufacturer and was the vice president of the Red Wing Linseed Oil Mills.^{:456}

== Military service ==
Seebach during his service in the 13th Minnesota Infantry Regiment

Seebach was a member of the Minnesota National Guard, he enlisted as a Private in Company G of the 1st Regiment of the Minnesota National Guard on February 23, 1888.^{:456} Seebach was promoted to Sergeant, Second Lieutenant, and First Lieutenant before being promoted to the rank of Captain of Company G.^{:456}

During the Spanish–American War Company G of the 1st Minnesota Guard was federalized and designated as Company G of the 13th Minnesota Infantry Regiment. Seebach was mustered into service in Red Wing on April 29, 1898.^{:245} During the Battle of Manila Seebach was shot through both of his lungs on August 13, 1898.^{:245} Seebach eventually recovered and commanded the 1st Battalion of the 13th Minnesota.^{:245} Seebach was mustered out of active service in San Francisco on October 3, 1899.^{:245} Seebach was breveted with the rank of Major "for gallantry" during the Battle of Manila.^{:457}

At the outbreak of World War I Seebach returned to reserve duty as a training officer and served in Germany for ten years with the occupation forces.

== Political career ==
=== State and local offices ===
Following his return to the United States Seebach served as the Assistant Adjutant General of Minnesota from January 1, 1901, to January 1, 1905.^{:457} Seebach also served as the Minnesota department commander of the United Spanish War Veterans.^{:457} Seebach later served as an alderman for the city of Red Wing from May 1, 1906, to 1917.

=== Minnesota House ===
Seebach was elected as a nonpartisan candidate to the Minnesota House of Representatives on November 7, 1916, as a representative for Minnesota's 19th House district. Seebach served during the 40th Minnesota Legislature from January 1, 1917, to January 5, 1919. During his term Seebach was a member of the following committees; cities, elections, legislative expense, military affairs, public accounts and expenditures, the Minnesota soldiers home, state and other libraries, state training school, and workmen's compensation.

== Death ==
Seebach died on May 28, 1939 in Asheville, North Carolina. Seebach is buried in Oakwood Cemetery in Red Wing.

== Personal life ==
Seebach was married to Clara Less on October 9, 1893 in Red Wing.^{:456}
