= Oakwood Mausoleum =

Oakwood Mausoleum may refer to any the mausoleums named "Oakwood" or "Oak Wood", including:

- Oakwood Cemetery Mausoleum, in Saline, Michigan
- Oakwood Memorial Mausoleum, in Saginaw, Michigan

== See also ==
- Oakwood Cemetery (disambiguation)
