= Jerome Fuller =

American lawyer

2nd Chief Justice of the Minnesota Territorial Supreme Court
- In office November 13, 1851 – 1852 Serving with Henry Z. Hayner
- Appointed by: Millard Fillmore
- Preceded by: Aaron Goodrich
- Succeeded by: William H. Welch

Personal details
- Born: June 26, 1808 Litchfield, Connecticut, US
- Died: September 2, 1880 (aged 72)
- Resting place: High Street Cemetery, Brockport, New York, USA
- Profession: Attorney

Jerome Fuller (June 26, 1808 – September 2, 1880) was an American lawyer and chief justice of Minnesota Territorial Supreme Court from 1851 to 1852.

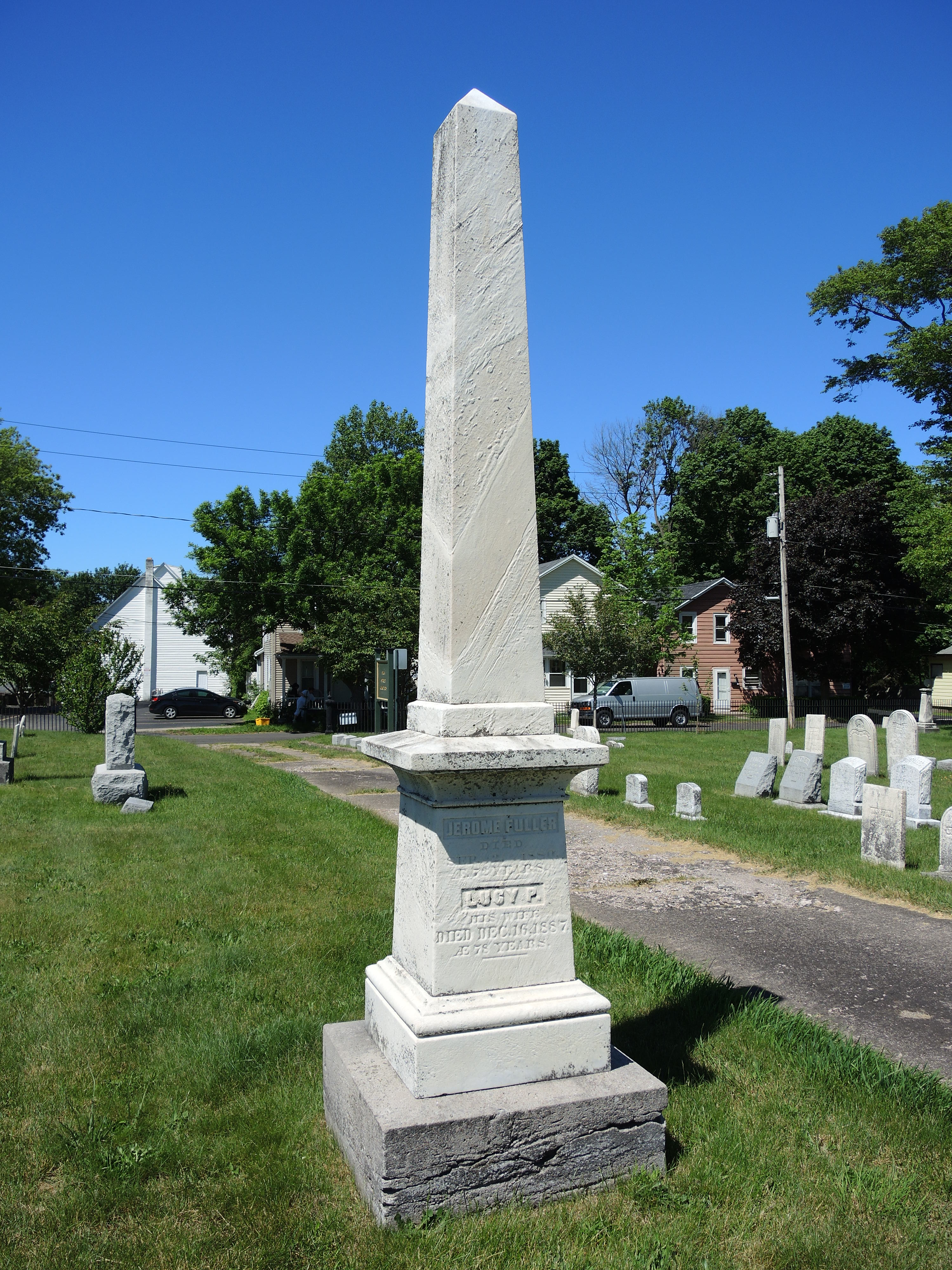
Monument in Lake View Cemetery, Brockport

Fuller was born in Litchfield, Connecticut in 1808, but details are scarce about his early years. At some point he moved to Brockport, New York. He was a member of the New York State Assembly (Monroe Co.) in 1843, and of the New York State Senate (27th D.) in 1848 and 1849. He was the founding editor of the Albany Register newspaper. On November 13, 1851 Fuller was appointed to the Minnesota Territorial Supreme Court by President Millard Fillmore following the removal of Aaron Goodrich. His appointment was denied by the United States Senate, but news of this did not reach St. Paul until after Fuller had arrived and started work. He sat on the court's July 1852 term and continued in his post until the end of that year.

Fuller subsequently returned to Brockport, New York, where he was elected County Judge. He died on September 2, 1880, and was buried with his wife Lucy in High Street Cemetery, Brockport, N.Y.

New York State Senate
Preceded by new district	New York State Senate; 27th District; 1848–1849	Succeeded by Samuel Miller
