= Oakland Cemetery =

Oakland Cemetery may refer to:

- Oakland Cemetery (Camden, Arkansas), listed on the National Register of Historic Places (NHRP)
- Oakland Cemetery, Confederate Section, Camden, Arkansas, listed on the NRHP
- Oakland-Fraternal Cemetery, listed on the NRHP
- Oakland Cemetery (Atlanta), Georgia, listed on the NRHP
- Oakland Cemetery (Princeton, Illinois), listed on the NRHP
- Oakland Cemetery (Fort Dodge, Iowa), listed on the NRHP
- Oakland Cemetery (Iowa City, Iowa)
- Oakland Cemetery (Shreveport, Louisiana), listed on the NRHP in Louisiana
- Oakland Cemetery (Yonkers, New York)
- Oakland Cemetery Chapel and Superintendent's House and Office, Sandusky, Ohio, listed on the NRHP in Ohio
- Oakland Cemetery (Shelby, Ohio), cemetery in Shelby, Ohio
- Oakland Cemetery (Dallas, Texas)
- Oakland Cemetery (Trenton, Tennessee), listed on the NRHP
- Oakland Cemetery (St. Paul, Minnesota)

== See also ==
- Oakwood Cemetery (disambiguation)
