= Oakwood Cemetery =

Oakwood Cemetery may refer to any of at least 200 cemeteries named "Oakwood" or "Oak Wood" in the United States, including:

- Historic Oakwood Cemetery, in Raleigh, North Carolina, also known as "Oakwood Cemetery"
- Oakwood Cemetery (Austin, Texas), originally called "City Cemetery"
- Oakwood Cemetery (Fremont, Ohio)
- Oakwood Cemetery (Jefferson, Texas)
- Oakwood Cemetery (Lansing Township, Minnesota)
- Oakwood Cemetery (Montgomery, Alabama)
- Oakwood Cemetery (Niagara Falls, New York)
- Oakwood Cemetery (Parsons, Kansas)
- Oakwood Cemetery (Red Wing, Minnesota), listed on the National Register of Historic Places (NRHP) in Goodhue County
- Oakwood Cemetery (Richmond, Virginia)
- Oakwood Cemetery (Rochester, Minnesota)
- Oakwood Cemetery (Saginaw, Michigan)
- Oakwood Cemetery (Syracuse, New York), listed on the NRHP in Onondaga County
- Oakwood Cemetery (Troy, New York), listed on the NRHP in Rensselaer County
- Oakwood Cemetery (Huntsville, Texas)
- Oakwood Cemetery (Waco, Texas)
- Oakwood Cemetery (Warren, Ohio)
- Oakwood Memorial Park Cemetery, in Chatsworth, Los Angeles, California

== See also ==
- Oakland Cemetery (disambiguation)
- Oak Woods Cemetery, Chicago, Illinois
- Oakwood Cemetery Chapel (disambiguation)
- Oakwood Mausoleum (disambiguation)
