= Oakwood Cemetery Chapel =

Oakwood Cemetery Chapel may refer to:

- Oakwood Cemetery Chapel (Allegan, Michigan), listed on the National Register of Historic Places in Allegan County, Michigan
- Oakwood Cemetery Chapel (Cuyahoga Falls, Ohio), listed on the National Register of Historic Places in Summit County, Ohio

== See also ==
- Oakwood Cemetery (disambiguation)
