= Sidney Lovell =

American architect

- Born: February 26, 1867; Racine, Wisconsin, U.S.
- Died: August 6, 1938 (aged 71); Chicago, Illinois, U.S.
- Occupation: Architect
- Parent(s): Philip and Louisa Knill Lovell
- Practice: Wood and Lovell
- Buildings: Lafayette Square Opera House, Rosehill Mausoleum

Sidney Lovell (February 26, 1867 — August 6, 1938) was an American architect best known for designing mausoleums, and to a lesser extent theaters and opera houses. His first cemetery commission, the mausoleum at Rosehill Cemetery in Chicago, Illinois, is considered his best work. He obtained a patent on an improved mausoleum ventilation system in 1917. Two of his works are listed on the National Register of Historic Places.

== Early life ==
Sidney Lovell was born February 26, 1867, in Racine, Wisconsin, to Philip and Louisa (née Knill) Lovell. He was the sixth of seven children. Philip Lovell had emigrated to the United States at the age of 24 from Driffield, East Yorkshire, United Kingdom, while Louisa Knill had emigrated at the age of 17 from Cheltenham, Gloucestershire, United Kingdom. Both arrived in 1845 and took up residence in Beloit, Wisconsin. They married on April 26, 1856, and moved to Racine in 1857. The Lovells were among Racine's earliest settlers (the town had only been founded in 1841), and Philip earned a living as a butcher.

Like his younger brother Frank, Sidney was most likely educated in the local public schools. Philip Lovell died on July 12, 1873, when Sidney was six years old. Philip Lovell had been very prosperous, and left his wife well-off. (For example, she owned 1 percent of the stock in the Commercial and Savings Bank of Racine.)

== Architectural career ==
=== Theater years ===
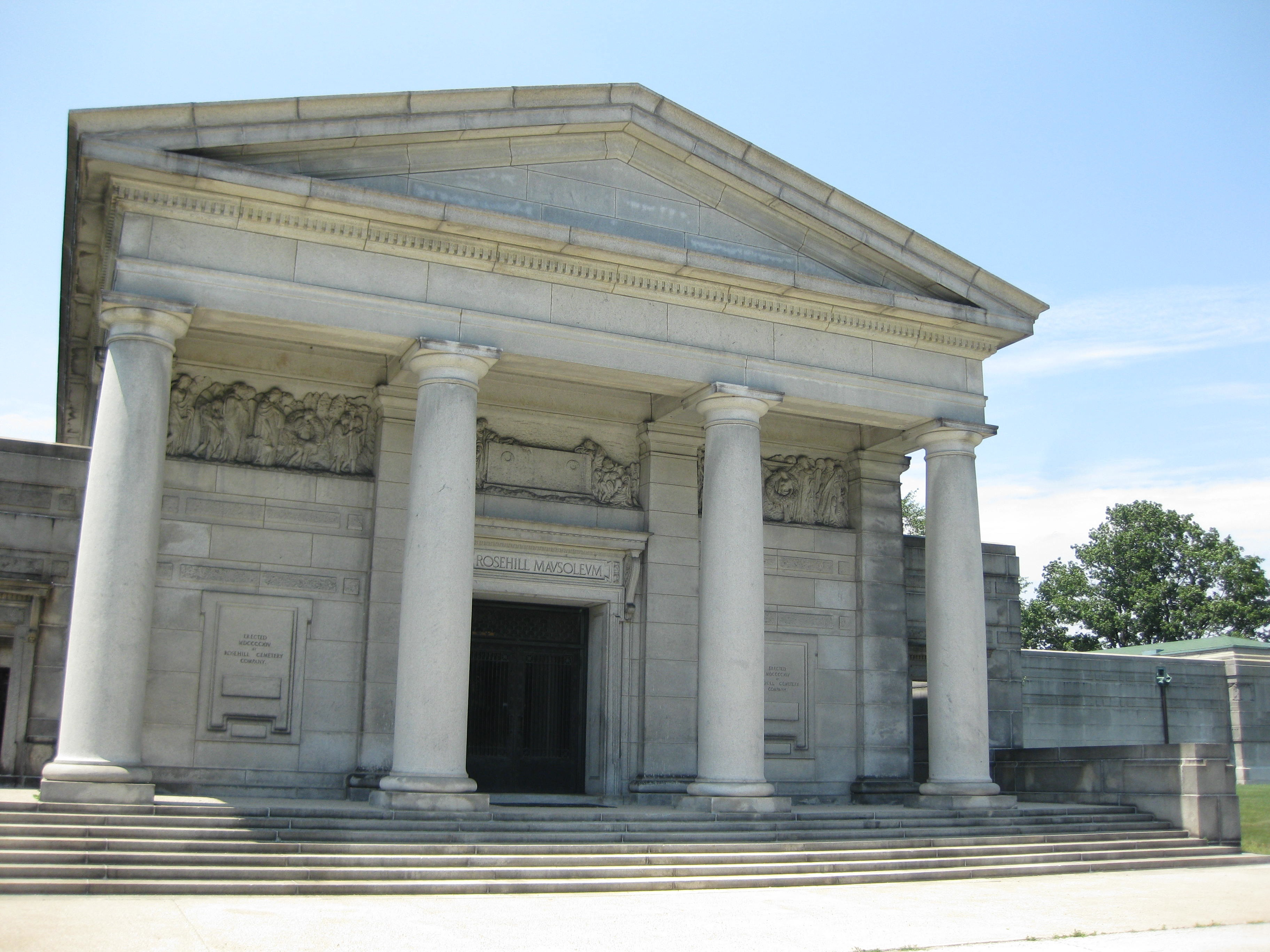
The mausoleum at Rosehill Cemetery in Chicago, considered Lovell's masterwork.

In 1882, architect James M. Wood arrived in Racine for the opening of the Blake Opera House, which he had designed and which he was to manage. Lovell became acquainted with Wood, and left Racine with Wood in 1883. Lovell served as Wood's architectural apprentice (there being almost no schools of architecture at the time), and assisted Wood in designing the Grand Opera House in Wausau, Wisconsin, in 1883; the Academy of Music in East Saginaw, Michigan, 1884; Wood's Opera House in Bay City, Michigan, in 1885; and then later large-scale theatrical scenery in Chicago, Illinois. Although Lovell and Wood's activities between 1883 and 1885 are not known, by 1885 Lovell was a full-fledged architect.

From spring 1885 to summer 1886, Wood and Lovell traveled from town to town in Michigan, designing theatrical scenery. In 1886, Wood designed the Hennepin Avenue Theater in Minneapolis, Minnesota. Wood and Lovell's other activities are not known from 1886 to 1888, but in 1888 the pair arrived in Los Angeles, California, where Wood had won a commission to remodel the Grand Opera House The project was finished in 1890. The two men formed a partnership, Wood & Lovell, in 1891 in San Francisco. (Note: Historian Barbara Coy Janssens says the firm was established in 1888, but this conflicts with Gebhard and Winters' statement that Wood was working on the Grand Opera House in Los Angeles until 1890, and Lewis, Millard, and Byington's The Bay of San Francisco claim that the firm of Wood & Lovell did not exist until 1891. Janssens also claims that Wood & Lovell designed the New California Theatre, erected in 1889. Theater owner Michael B. Leavitt makes no mention of Lovell, nor does The Electrical World article about theater's design.) The firm added a third partner, Fuller Claflin, in 1893. Wood and Lovell focused on commissions in Chicago and New York City, while Claflin handled West Coast business. The same year, Wood & Lovell opened a branch office in Chicago, to which the two original partners removed. They kept their San Francisco office open until 1895.

During this period, Wood & Lovell specialized in theaters with an East Indian decorative motif. Among the projects on which Lovell and Wood worked were the Broadway Theatre in Denver, Colorado, in 1890; the Marquam Grand Opera House in Portland, Oregon, in 1890; the Loring Opera House in Riverside, California, in 1890; the Tacoma Theater in Tacoma, Washington, in 1890; the Yosemite Theater in Stockton, California, in 1892; Stockwell's Theatre in San Francisco in 1892; the Empire Theater in Quincy, Illinois, in 1893; the Lafayette Square Opera House in Washington, D.C., in 1895; and the Jefferson Theatre in Portland, Oregon, in 1896.

In 1897, Wood and Lovell dissolved their partnership. Lovell continued to design theaters, including the Tucson Opera House in Tucson, Arizona, in 1897; the Overland Theater in Nebraska City, Nebraska, in 1897; the Metropolitan Opera House in Owatonna, Minnesota, in 1897; the Appleton Opera House in Appleton, Wisconsin, in 1901; the Neenah Theater (a movie theater) in Neenah, Wisconsin, in 1902, the Illinois Theatre in Rock Island, Illinois, in 1905; and the Kedzie Avenue Theater Annex (a movie theater) in 1912.

=== Other buildings ===
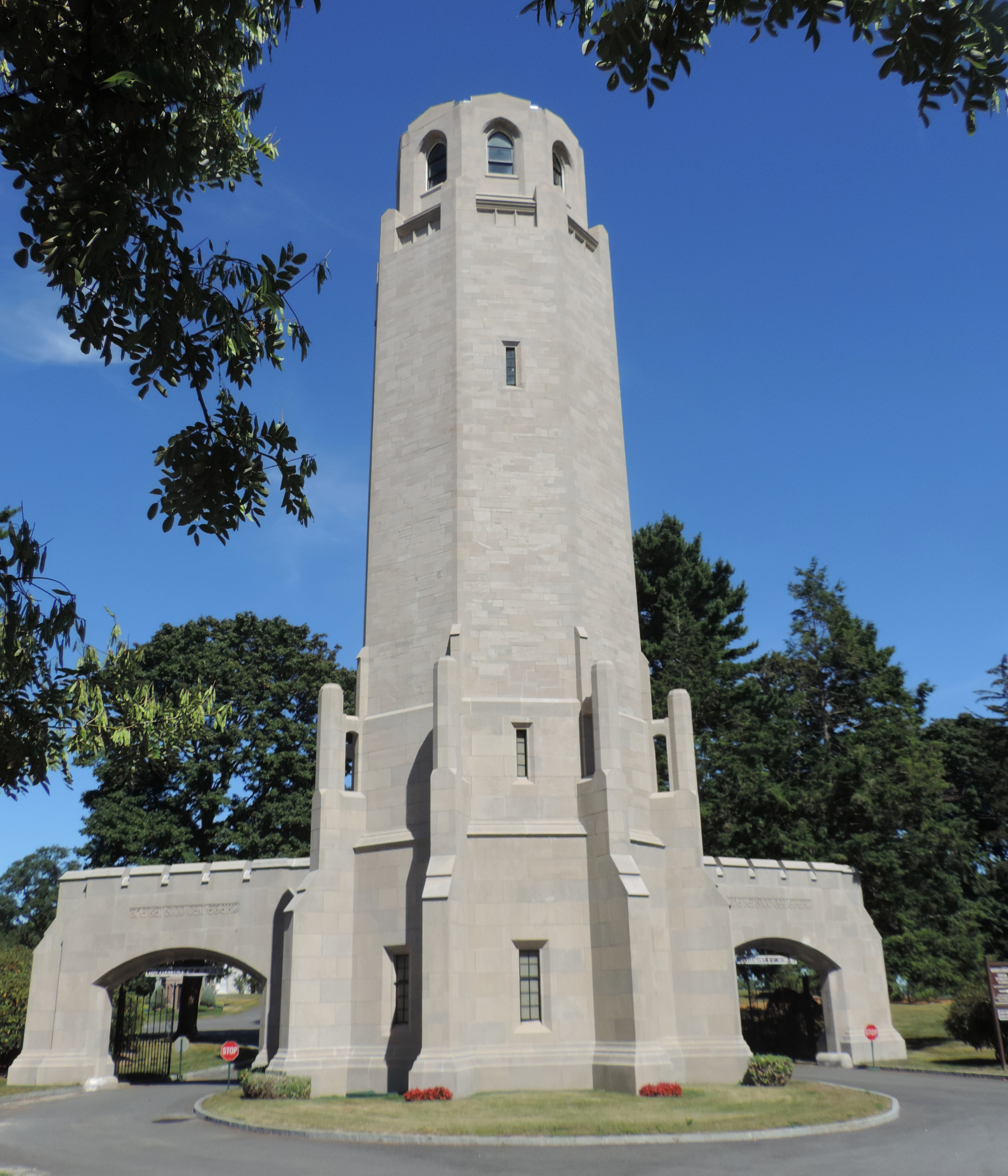
Entrance tower at Kensico Cemetery by Lovell & Lovell, which cleverly concealed the cemetery's water tank.

As early as 1892, Lovell began work designing non-theatrical buildings as well. One of the earliest was the Hotel Renaissance, built in San Francisco in 1892. Lovell continued to design non-theatrical structures, such as apartment buildings, but did not focus his work in this area until about 1913. In that year, he designed a department store building in Marinette, Wisconsin; an apartment building in Chicago; a nickelodeon and billiard hall in Chicago; and a theater, office building, billiard hall, and retail store in Chicago.

In 1914, architects William Ernest Walker and Howard L. Cheney joined Lovell's firm. Over the next four years, Lovell continued to design a wide array of commercial structures: a five-story warehouse in Chicago in 1915; luxury apartments in Chicago in 1915; an ornate fence for wealthy Chicago residence in 1916; an apartment building Chicago in 1916; a large 18-unit apartment building Chicago in 1916; two small apartment buildings in Chicago in 1917; a testing laboratory building in Chicago in 1917; a factory and power station in Chicago Heights, Illinois, in 1917; and a factory in Chicago Heights, Illinois, in 1918.

=== Mausoleum work ===
In 1912, Rosehill Cemetery, a large cemetery on Chicago's North Side, contracted with Lovell for the design of a massive mausoleum. The Community Mausoleum (also known as the Rosehill Mausoleum) was completed in 1914, and is widely considered to be Lovell's masterwork. The $300,000 ($9,642,857 in 2025 dollars), 1,500-crypt structure was the first large-scale public mausoleum in the nation. The mausoleum contains 38 windows by the Tiffany Studios. This is the largest collection of secular Tiffany-designed glass in the United States, and was valued in 1994 at $10 million ($21,722,048 in 2025 dollars). In 1916, Lovell designed a $150,000 ($4,438,073 in 2025 dollars), 1,000-crypt mausoleum for Valhalla Cemetery in St. Louis, Missouri.

As Lovell designed mausoleums, he came to realize that there were fundamental problems facing above-ground burial. It had been common for centuries for above-ground burial vaults to be tightly sealed, to prevent the leakage of fluids and the spread of nauseating odors (both generated by the decomposition of the human body) from vaults. Tightly sealed vaults, however, allowed decomposition gases to build up, causing vaults to violently rupture ("exploding vault syndrome") and scatter partly-decomposed remains inside the mausoleum. Lovell designed a solution, which involved building a ventilation system and drainage system behind the vaults. He applied for a patent, which was granted on October 23, 1917 (patent number 1,244,109).

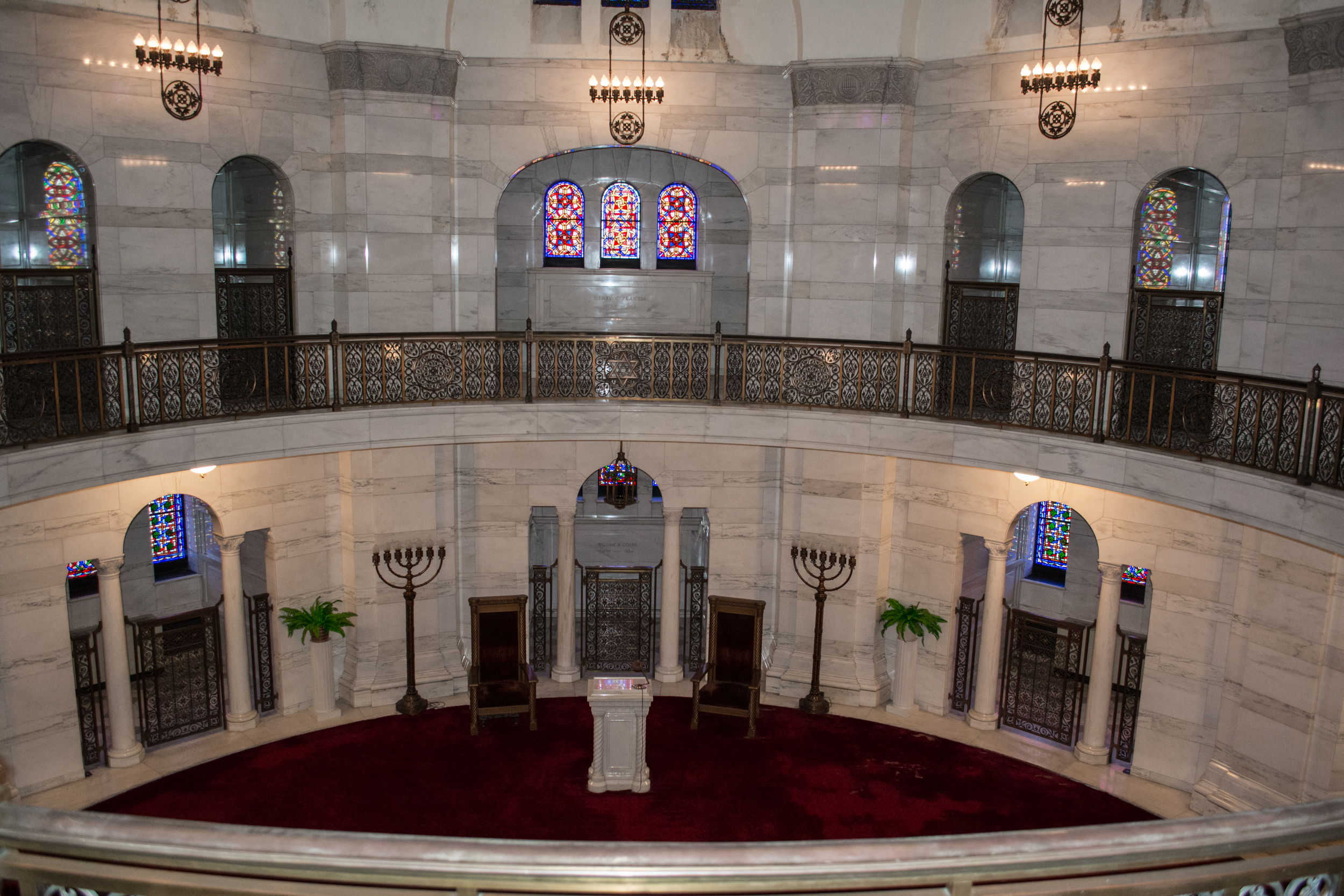
Chapel at the mausoleum at Mayfield Cemetery in Cleveland Heights, Ohio.

Lovell designed a mausoleum for Forest Hill Cemetery in Kansas City, Missouri, in 1919, and later that year designed and erected a large family monument for the Francis Joseph Reitz family in St. Joseph Catholic Cemetery in Evansville, Indiana.

In 1920, Lovell was at work on designs for the $264,000 ($4,242,857 in 2025 dollars) Oakwood Memorial Mausoleum in Saginaw, Michigan; and a $300,000 ($4,821,429 in 2025 dollars) mausoleum at Deepdale Cemetery in Lansing, Michigan; and a $150,000 ($2,410,714 in 2025 dollars) mausoleum at Forest Lawn Cemetery in Norfolk, Virginia; and a $150,000 ($2,410,714 in 2025 dollars) mausoleum at Old Mission Cemetery in Wichita, Kansas.

Lovell's son, Marion "Don" Lovell, joined his father's firm in 1922, and the company adopted the name "Lovell & Lovell".

In 1923, Lovell was commissioned to design a large mausoleum at Knollwood Cemetery in Mayfield Heights, Ohio. The $175,000 structure was finished in 1928. Lovell designed a public mausoleum for Kensico Cemetery in Valhalla, New York, in 1924, and a unique Gothic stone entrance to conceal a 60-foot (18 m) high water tower in 1928. He also designed the Oakwood Memorial Mausoleum in Oakwood Cemetery in Dixon, Illinois, in 1924.

Lovell designed another Cleveland-area mausoleum in 1926 for Mayfield Cemetery in Cleveland Heights, Ohio. The $400,000 structure opened in 1929. Lovell & Lovell finished design work on the $250,000 Memorial Crypt at Fairlawn Cemetery in Decatur, Illinois, in late 1925 or early 1926. It opened in April 1927.

Lovell completed work on the Llano Pantheon, a mausoleum in Llano Cemetery in Amarillo, Texas, in 1927.

In association with T. P. Barnett & Co., Lovell & Lovell designed a mausoleum at Oak Grove Cemetery in St. Louis in 1928. That same year, Lovell & Lovell designed a mausoleum at Mount Royal Cemetery in Pittsburgh, Pennsylvania, a $500,000 mausoleum at Forest Park Cemetery in Houston, Texas, and a $250,000 mausoleum at Springdale Cemetery in Peoria, Illinois. (Note: Don Lovell alone is credited with the 1928 design of the mausoleum at Woodlawn Park Cemetery.)

In 1930, Lovell & Lovell completed work on the Highland Memorial Mausoleum in Highland Cemetery in South Bend, Indiana.

The Chicago Daily Tribune reported that Lovell, alone or in association with his son, designed 56 mausoleums and mausoleum additions in his lifetime.

== Personal life ==
Lovell married Jane Winters Bruner of San Francisco on April 16, 1890. The couple had two children: son Marion McDonald (born July 7, 1895) and daughter Alice Booth (born July 1, 1899).

== Death ==
Sidney Lovell suffered from frail health in his last years. He died on August 6, 1938, at Birchwood Park Sanitarium in Chicago.

His funeral was held in the chapel at Rosehill Cemetery, and he was buried in the Rosehill Mausoleum.

== Honors ==
In 1925, Lovell won a "first mention" award in the Remodeled Building Class for his work on 224 E. Ontario Street in Chicago. The award was bestowed by the Lake Shore Trust and Savings Bank, which sponsored a series of architectural awards for construction in the North Central area of Chicago.

Two of Lovell's mausoleums are listed on the National Register of Historic Places. The Old Mission Cemetery mausoleum was specifically singled out for this honor in 2009. His mausoleum was included in the historic designation given to Springdale Cemetery in 2004.

== Bibliography ==
- Bibber, Joyce K.; Shettleworth, Earle G. Jr. (2007). Portland. Charleston, S.C.: Arcadia Publishing. ISBN 9780738550336.
- Bielski, Ursula (1998). Chicago Haunts: Ghostlore of the Windy City. Chicago: Lake Claremont Press. ISBN 9780964242678.
- Bloomfield, Ron (2015). Lost Bay City. Charleston, S.C.: Arcadia Publishing. ISBN 9781467114134.
- Butterfield, Consul Willshire (1879). The History of Racine and Kenosha Counties, Wisconsin: Containing a History of Each County, Its Early Settlement, Growth, Development, Resources, etc. Chicago: Western Historical Society.
- Consumers Union (1979). Funerals, Consumers' Last Rights. New York: Pantheon Books. ISBN 9780394738093.
- Gebhard, David; Winter, Robert (1977). A Guide to Architecture in Los Angeles and Southern California. Santa Barbara, Calif.: Peregrine Smith. ISBN 9780879050498.
- Gillan, John; Alvarez, Leonardo; Ford, Joseph Dillon (1994). Places in Time: Historic Architecture and Landscapes of Miami. Miami: Florida International University, School of Design. ISBN 9780964078406. OCLC 30456967.
- Harris, Mark (2007). Grave Matters: A Journey Through the Modern Funeral Industry to a Natural Way of Burial. New York: Scribner. ISBN 9780743277686.
- Headley, Robert K. (2006). Motion Picture Exhibition in Washington, D.C. Jefferson, N.C.: McFarland & Co. ISBN 9780786428427.
- Hettinga, Mary Jane Uecker (2002). Wausau Chronicles. Wausau, Wisc.: Birch Lake Press. ISBN 9780961778040.
- Hilzinger, J. George (1897). Treasure Land: A Story. Vol. 1. Tucson, Ariz.: Arizona Advancement Co.
- Historic Preservation Commission of South Bend and St. Joseph County (1993). City of South Bend, Summary Report: Indiana Historic Sites and Structures Inventory (Report). South Bend, Ind.: Historic Preservation Commission of South Bend and St. Joseph County.
- Hucke, Matt; Bielski, Ursula (1999). Graveyards of Chicago: The People, History, Art, and Lore of Cook County Cemeteries. Chicago: Lake Claremont Press. ISBN 9780964242647.
- Hunt, Herbert (1916). Tacoma, Its History and Its Builders: A Half Century of Activity. Chicago: S.J. Clarke Publishing Co. ISBN 9780722247280.
- Janssens, Barbara Coy (2003). "Sidney Lovell, Architect: Moments in His Life". Marquee. pp. 20–23.
- Leavitt, Michael Bennett (1912). Fifty Years in Theatrical Management. New York: Broadway Publishing Co.
- Leonard, J.W. (1887). Industries of the Saginaws. East Saginaw, Mich.: J.M. Elstner & Co.
- Lewis, Oscar; Millard, Bailey; Byington, Lewis F. (1892). The Bay of San Francisco: The Metropolis of the Pacific Coast and Its Suburban Cities: A History. Vol. 1. Chicago: Lewis Publishing Co.
- Lewis, Oscar; Millard, Bailey; Byington, Lewis F. (1892). The Bay of San Francisco: The Metropolis of the Pacific Coast and Its Suburban Cities: A History. Vol. 2. Chicago: Lewis Publishing Co.
- Morrison, Craig (2006). Theaters. New York: Norton. ISBN 9780393731088.
- Roberts, Darryl J. (1997). Profits of Death: An Insider Exposes the Death Care Industries. Chandler, Ariz.: Five Star Publications. ISBN 9781877749216.
- Schmitt, Gavin (2014). Neenah. Charleston, S.C.: Arcadia Publishing. ISBN 9781467113236.
- Slocum, Joshua; Carlson, Lisa (2011). Final Rights: Reclaiming the American Way of Death. Hinesburg, Vt.: Upper Access. ISBN 9780942679342.
- United States Patent Office (1918). Annual Report of the Commissioner of Patents for the Year 1917. Washington, D.C.: U.S. Government Printing Office.
- Webster, Robert (2007). "Does this mean you'll see me naked?": A Funeral Director Reflects On 30 Years of Serving the Living and the Deceased. Bloomington, Ind.: Rooftop Publishing. ISBN 9781600080715.
- Wisconsin Bank Examiner's Office (1896). Semi-Annual Report of the Bank Examiner of the Condition of the State and Private Banks of Wisconsin. Madison, Wisc.: Wisconsin State Bank Examiner.
