= John W. Albaugh =

American actor and manager (1837–1909)

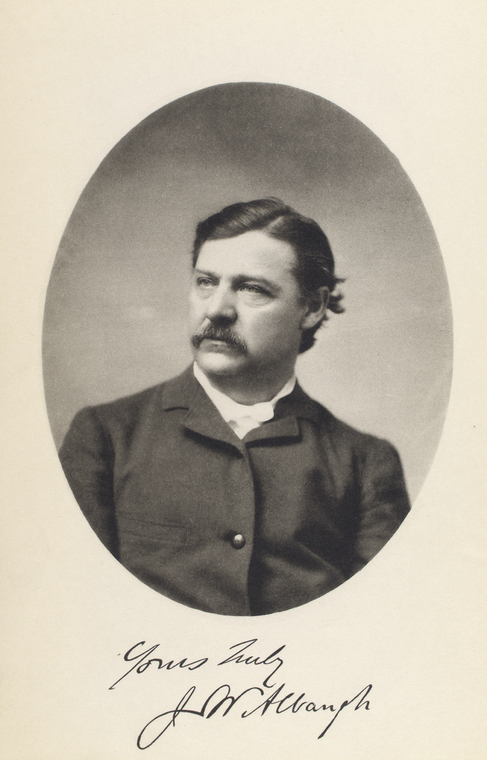
- Born: September 30, 1837; Baltimore, Maryland
- Died: February 11, 1909 (aged 71); Jersey City, New Jersey
- Occupation: Stage actor

John William Albaugh Sr. (September 30, 1837 – February 11, 1909), was an American actor and manager.

Born in Baltimore, Maryland, it was there that Albaugh made his first real appearance on the stage as the title character in a play called Brutus, or the Fall of Tarquin (1855), on a stage managed by Joseph Jefferson. Of his many subsequent impersonations, perhaps the best-known is that of Louis XI, at what later became Daly's Theatre in New York. After 1868 he was manager of theatres in St. Louis, New Orleans, and Albany. John was the sole lessee and manager of the Albaugh's Grand Opera House (1884–1894) in Washington, where he also built the Lafayette Square Opera House. He owned the new Lyceum Theatre in Baltimore, where he made his last appearance in 1899 before retiring from the stage.

Albaugh died at the home of his daughter in Jersey City from heart disease. His son John Albaugh Jr. (1867–1910) was also an actor and stage manager.
