= Frances Densmore =

American anthropologist (1867–1957)

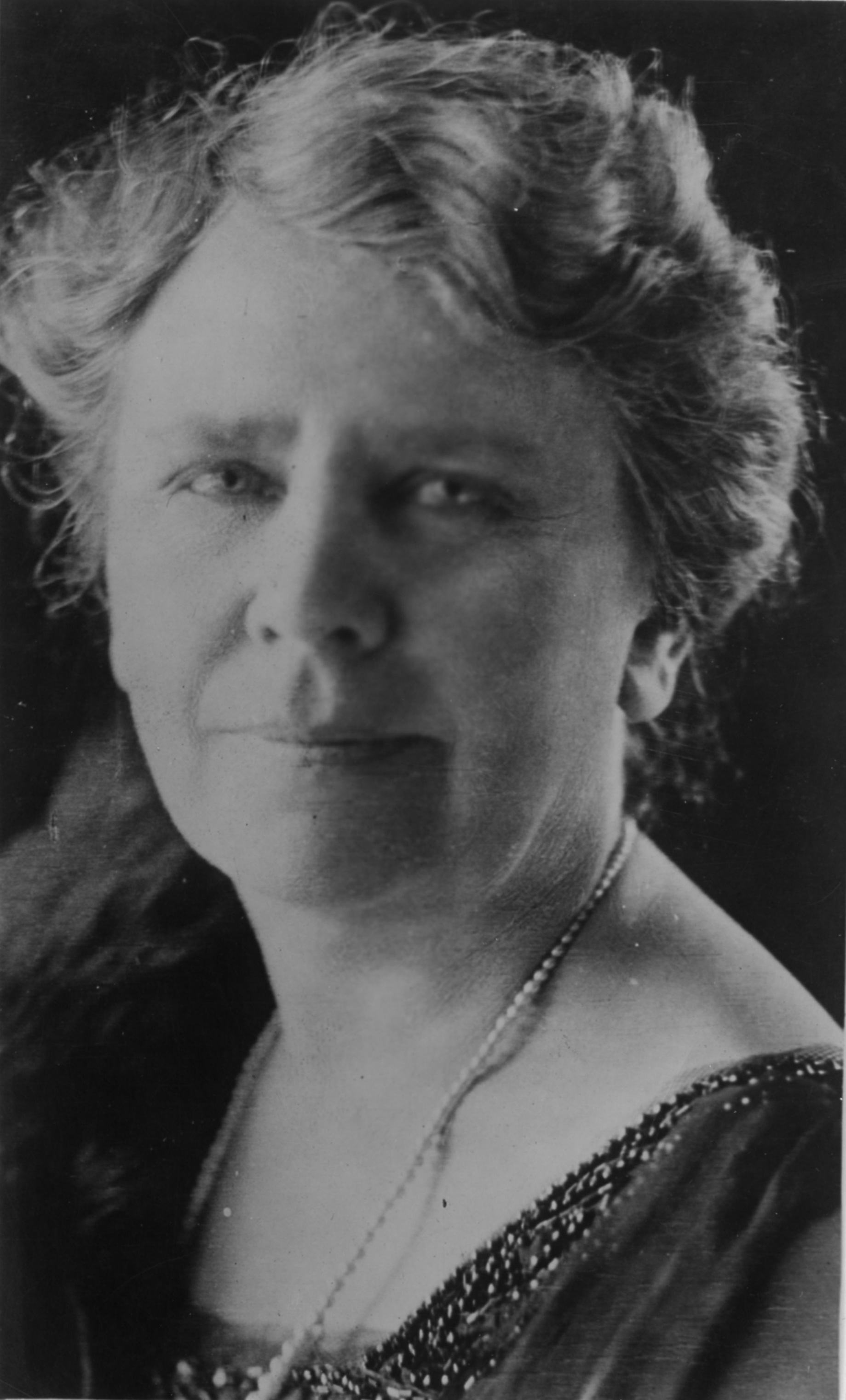
- Born: May 21, 1867; Red Wing, Minnesota, U.S.
- Died: June 5, 1957 (aged 90); Red Wing, Minnesota, U.S.
- Resting place: Oakwood Cemetery
- Known for: Preservation of Native American culture
- Scientific career
- Fields: Anthropologist, specializing as a Comparative musicologist ethnographer and ethnomusicologist
- Workplaces: Bureau of American Ethnology

Frances Theresa Densmore (May 21, 1867 – June 5, 1957) was an American anthropologist and ethnographer from Minnesota. Densmore studied Native American music and culture, and in modern terms, she may be described as an ethnomusicologist.

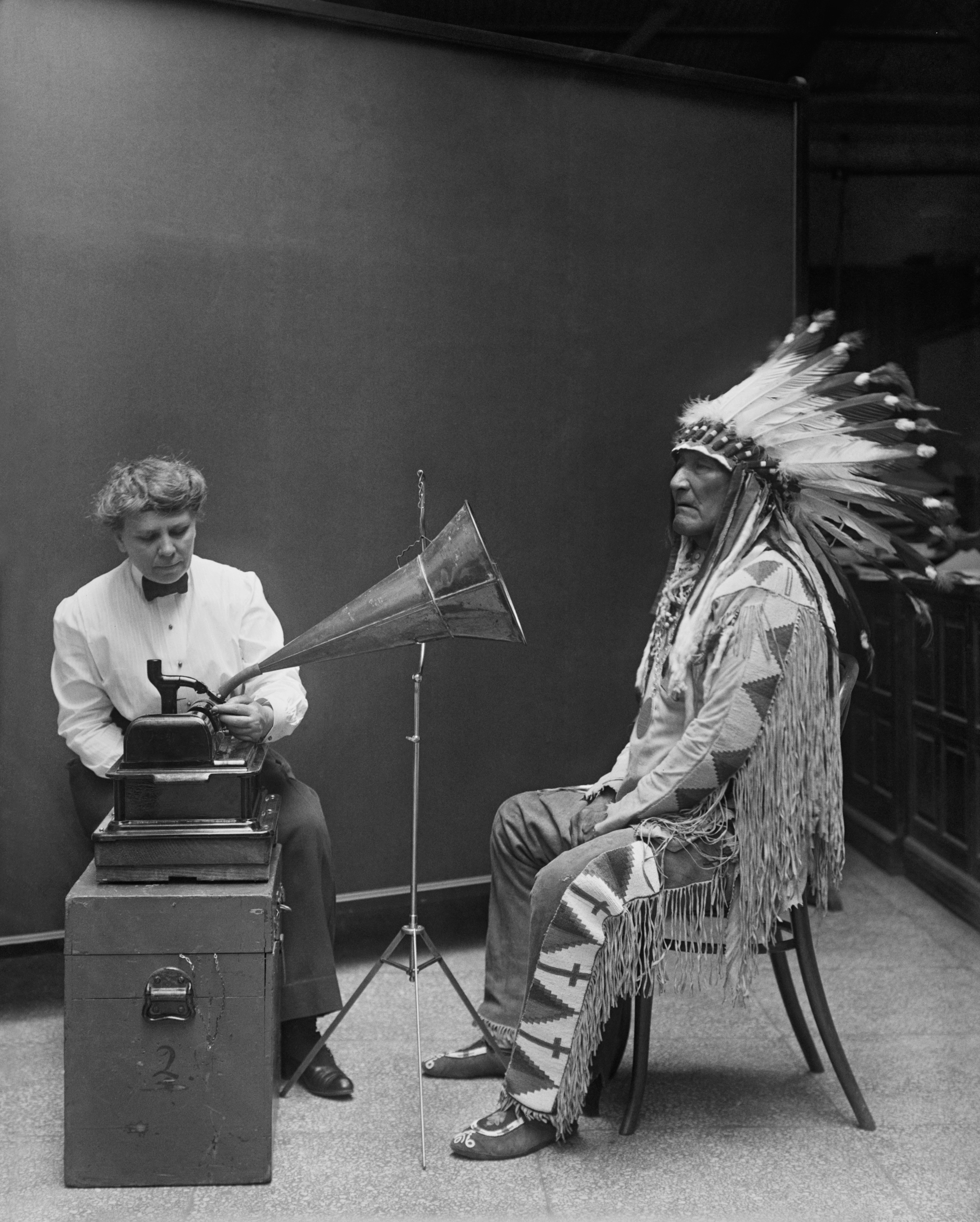
Densmore with Blackfoot chief, Mountain Chief, during a 1916 phonograph recording session for the Bureau of American Ethnology.

== Life and Works ==
Densmore was born on May 21, 1867, in Red Wing, Minnesota. As a child Densmore developed an appreciation of music by listening to the nearby Dakota Indians. She studied music at Oberlin College for three years. Her interest in American Indian music was in part driven by reading Alice Cunningham Fletcher's work.

During the early part of the twentieth century, she worked as a music teacher with Native Americans nationwide, while also learning, recording, and transcribing their music, and documenting its use in their culture. She helped preserve their culture in a time when government policy was to encourage Native Americans to adopt Western customs.

Densmore began recording music officially for the Smithsonian Institution's Bureau of American Ethnology (BAE) in 1907. In her fifty-plus years of studying and preserving American Indian music, she collected thousands of recordings. Many of the recordings she made on behalf of the BAE now are held in the Library of Congress. While her original recordings often were on wax cylinders, many of them have been reproduced using other media and are included in other archives. The recordings may be accessed by researchers as well as Tribal delegations.

Some of the Tribes she worked with include the Ojibwe, Mandan, Hidatsa, Sioux, northern Pawnee in present day Oklahoma, Tohono O'odham in present day Arizona, Indians of Washington and British Columbia, Ho-Chunk and Menominee of Wisconsin, Pueblo Indigenous peoples of the southwest, including Acoma, Isleta, Cochiti, and Zuni, Seminole in present day Florida, and Guna in Panama. Densmore frequently was published in the journal American Anthropologist, contributing consistently throughout her career. Her manuscript A Study of Some Michigan Indians (1949) was the first publication in the University of Michigan Press American Anthropologist monograph series.

She wrote The Indians and Their Music in 1926. Between 1910 and 1957, she published fourteen book-length bulletins for the Smithsonian, each describing the musical practices and repertories of a different Native American group. These were reprinted as a series by DaCapo Press in 1972. Raymond DeMallie describes Densmore's Teton Sioux Music and Culture as "one of the most significant ethnographic works ever published on the Sioux."

She also was a part of "A Ventriloquy of Anthros" in the American Indian Quarterly along with James Owen Dorsey and Eugene Buechel.

Densmore died of bronchopneumonia on June 5, 1957, at a hospital in Red Wing. She was buried in Oakwood Cemetery.

== Awards ==
Oberlin College awarded Densmore an honorary M.A. degree in 1924. Macalester College followed suit in 1950, awarding her an honorary Doctor of Letters degree. In 1954, the Minnesota Historical Society recognized her with its first-ever "Citation for Distinguished Service in the Field of Minnesota History."

The National Association for American Composers and Conductors recognized Densmore in its 1940–1941 awards for her musicological work.

== Publications ==
- Chippewa Music (Washington DC, 1910–13/R)
- Teton Sioux Music (Washington DC, 1918/R, 2/1992)
- Northern Ute Music (Washington DC, 1922/R)
- Mandan and Hidatsa Music (Washington DC, 1923/R)
- The American Indians and their Music (New York, 1926/R, 2/1937)
- Papago Music (Washington DC, 1929/R)
- Pawnee Music (Washington DC, 1929/R)
- Menominee Music (Washington DC, 1932/R)
- Yuman and Yaqui Music (Washington DC, 1932/R)
- Cheyenne and Arapaho Music (Los Angeles, 1936)
- Music of Santo Domingo Pueblo, New Mexico (Los Angeles, 1938)
- Nootka and Quileute Music (Washington DC, 1939/R)
- Music of the Indians of British Columbia (Washington DC, 1943/R)
- Choctaw Music (Washington DC, 1943/R)
- Seminole Music (Washington DC, 1956/R)
- Music of Acoma, Isleta, Cochiti and Zuni Pueblos (Washington DC, 1957/R)

== Discography ==
Smithsonian-Densmore Cylinder Collection (1910–1930) includes:

- Songs of the Chippewa
- Songs of the Sioux
- Songs of the Yuma, Cocopa, and Yaqui
- Songs of the Pawnee and Northern Ute
- Songs of the Papago
- Songs of the Nootka and Quileute
- Songs of the Menominee, Mandan and Hidatsa

== See also ==
- Women in musicology
