= Lafayette Square Opera House =

Former theatre and opera house in Washington D.C.

- Belasco Theatre (after 1905)
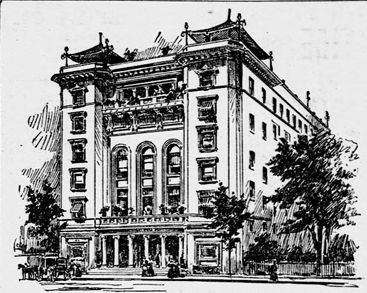
- Architect's rendering of the Lafayette Square Opera House
- Interactive map of Lafayette Square Opera House
- Address: 717 Madison Place NW; Washington D.C. United States
- Coordinates: 38.899462°N 77.034851°W
- Owner: John W. Albaugh, 1895 – 1905; The Shubert Organization and David Belasco 1905 – 1940
- Capacity: 1,800
- Type: Opera House

Construction
- Opened: September 30, 1895
- Closed: 1940
- Demolished: 1964
- Years active: 1895 - 1940
- Architects: Wood & Lovell

The Lafayette Square Opera House was an opera house built in 1895, at 717 Madison Place, NW in Washington D.C. It was dedicated on 30 September 1895 by Lillian Russell, one of the most well known actresses of the time, who was there to perform in Tzigane. Reginald De Koven, composer of the opera, led the orchestra at Russell's request. In 1905 it was purchased by the Shuberts and David Belasco and was renamed the Belasco Theatre. The theatre was acquired by the US federal government and used as a warehouse until World War II, when it was operated by the American Theatre Wing as a Stage Door Canteen. During the Korean War, it was used by the United Services Organization to entertain troops. The theater was razed in 1964.

== History ==
The Lafayette Square Opera House (LSOH) as built by John W. Albaugh, on behalf of the Lafayette Square Opera House Company. It was completed in September 1895 at a cost of 250,000 dollars ($9.68 million in present day terms). Located on Madison Place NW, just north of Pennsylvania Avenue, the theater faced Lafayette Square and the White House. The site, originally the home of Commodore John Rodgers, was noted for a history of tragic events. It was there that Congressman, later Civil War General, Daniel Sickles killed the district attorney for the District of Columbia, Philip Barton Key II, son of Francis Scott Key. Following the Civil War, John Wilkes Booth's co-conspirator, Lewis Powell, attempted to take the life of Secretary of State William H. Seward, who was living there at the time. The property was later purchased by former Secretary of State James G. Blaine, and it was there that he and two of his children, Walker and Alice, died.

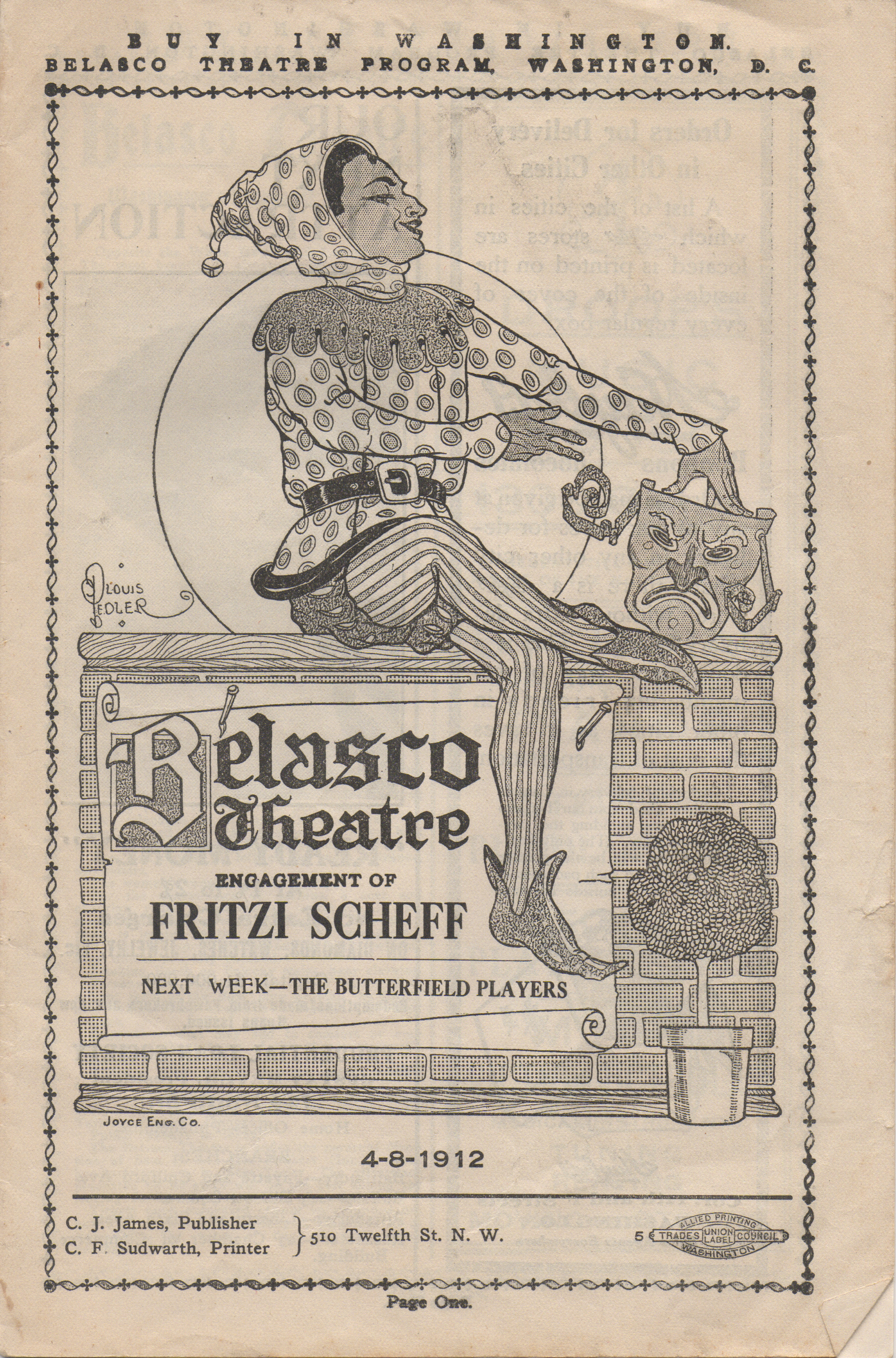
Program for the Belasco Theater, April 8, 1912

The structure was built of polished gray granite in the classic Grecian order style. Its frontage was 76 feet wide and 176 feet deep. The steel frame building, equipped with the latest fireproof rigging of the time and using an asbestos stage curtain, was advertised is being absolutely fireproof. The main entrance was thirty-six feet wide, and opened directly to the sidewalk on Madison Place. The lobby was finished in mahogany with mosaic tile flooring. Broad marble staircases on either side led to the upper floors. The main floor rose five tiers, constructed on the cantilever, with two Ionic columns on the main floor and three in the balconies. The mezzanine was divided into 31 stalls, one for each President of the United States at that time, each seating four to eight people. The theater had 1,800 seats, "not one from which actors can not be seen."

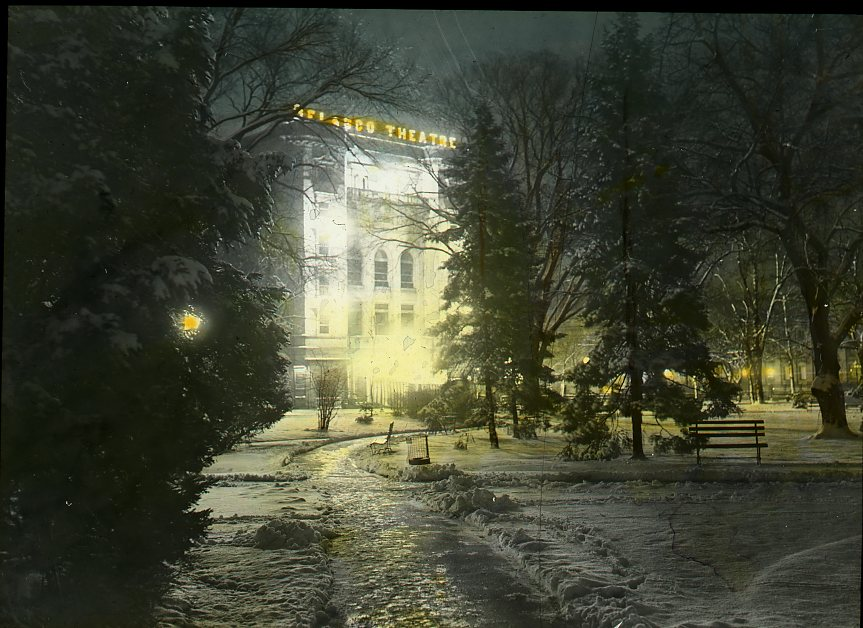
The Belasco Theatre in 1910

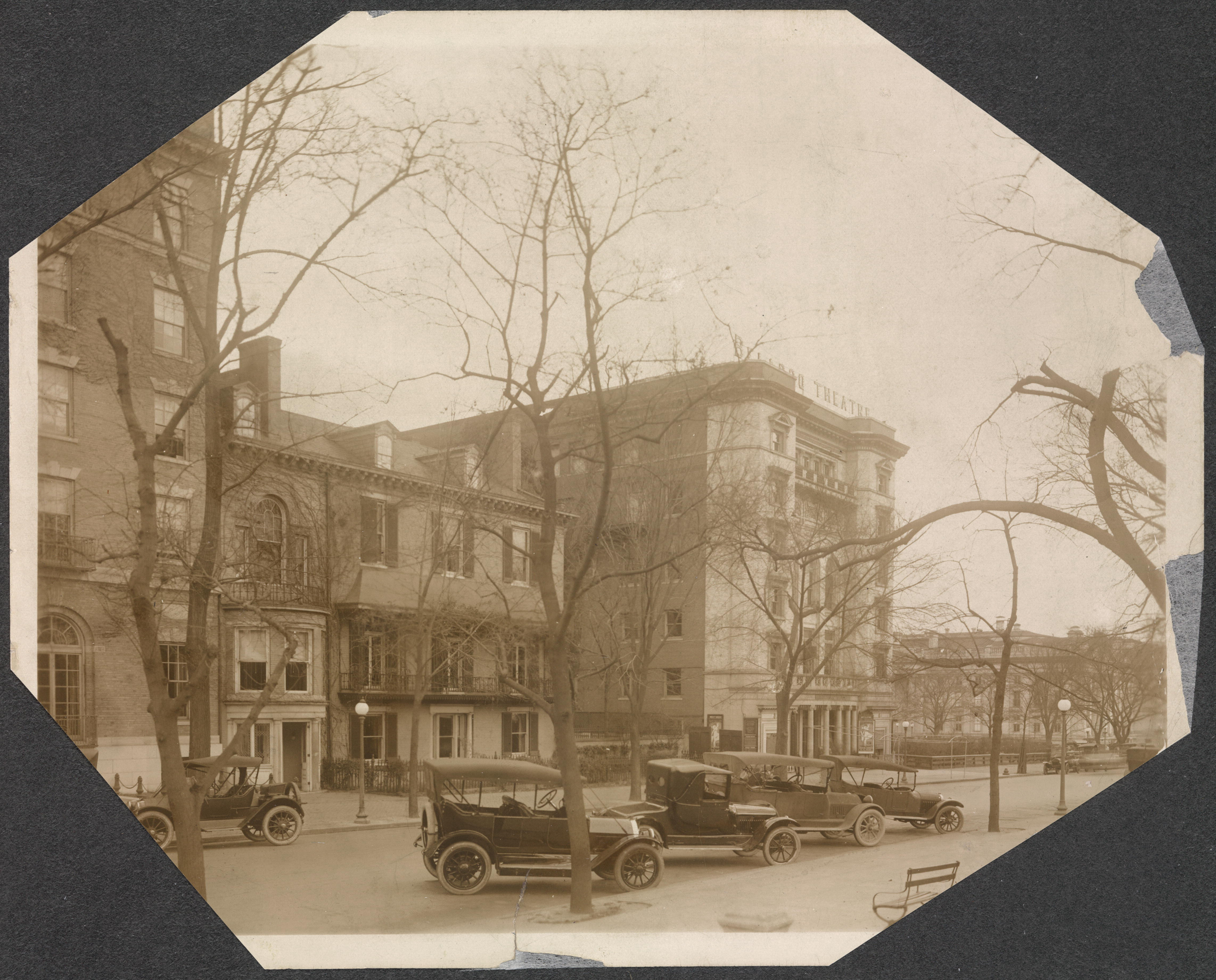
The Belasco Theatre (right), c. 1916

The wrought steel front railings of the boxes and balconies were designed by Trost & Trost Architects. The interior was finished in the Italian renaissance style. On the asbestos stage curtain was a copy of Fernand Cormon's painting, Les Vainqueurs de Salamine. The stage itself was 68 feet wide and 45 feet deep. The roof was constructed for use as a theater in the summer months, with seating up to 1,500. The basement was used primarily for Victorian Turkish baths, but did include a barber shop and restrooms.

On November 23, 1903, David Belasco's Sweet Kitty Bellairs was given its premiere at the LSOH. In September 1905 it was purchased by the S. S. Shubert Amusement Company and David Belasco for 225,000 dollars ($8.06 million in present day terms). It reopened in October as the Belasco Theater. In the 1930s, it was converted to a movie house.

In 1940 the Belasco Theatre and its neighboring properties were acquired by the federal government. The theater, with its seats removed, was used as a warehouse until World War II, when parts of it were used by the American Theatre Wing as a Stage Door Canteen. During the Korean War, it was used by the United Services Organization to entertain troops. The theater was razed in 1964 and the site is now home to the U.S. Court of Federal Claims Building.
