= Oakwood Cemetery (Saginaw, Michigan) =

- Interactive map of Oakwood Cemetery

Details
- Established: 1868; 158 years ago
- Location: 6100 Gratiot Road; Saginaw, Michigan
- Country: United States
- Coordinates: 43.4202995°N 84.0366974°W
- Type: Public
- Owned by: City of Saginaw
- Size: 100 acres (40 ha)
- Website: www.saginaw-mi.com/201/Cemeteries

Oakwood Cemetery is a public cemetery in Saginaw, Michigan.

== Location ==
Oakwood Cemetery is located on the corner of Gratiot and Midland Roads in Saginaw, Michigan. It spans approximately 100 acres (40 ha). It is located near Oakwood Memorial Mausoleum, but not affiliated with the mausoleum.

== Operations ==
It is owned and operated by the Cemeteries Division of the City of Saginaw government.

Its records are managed by the City of Saginaw, and available via a database co-managed by the Public Libraries of Saginaw.

== History ==
Oakwood Cemetery was opened in 1868.
