= William H. Welch (judge) =

American jurist

The Honourable William H. Welch
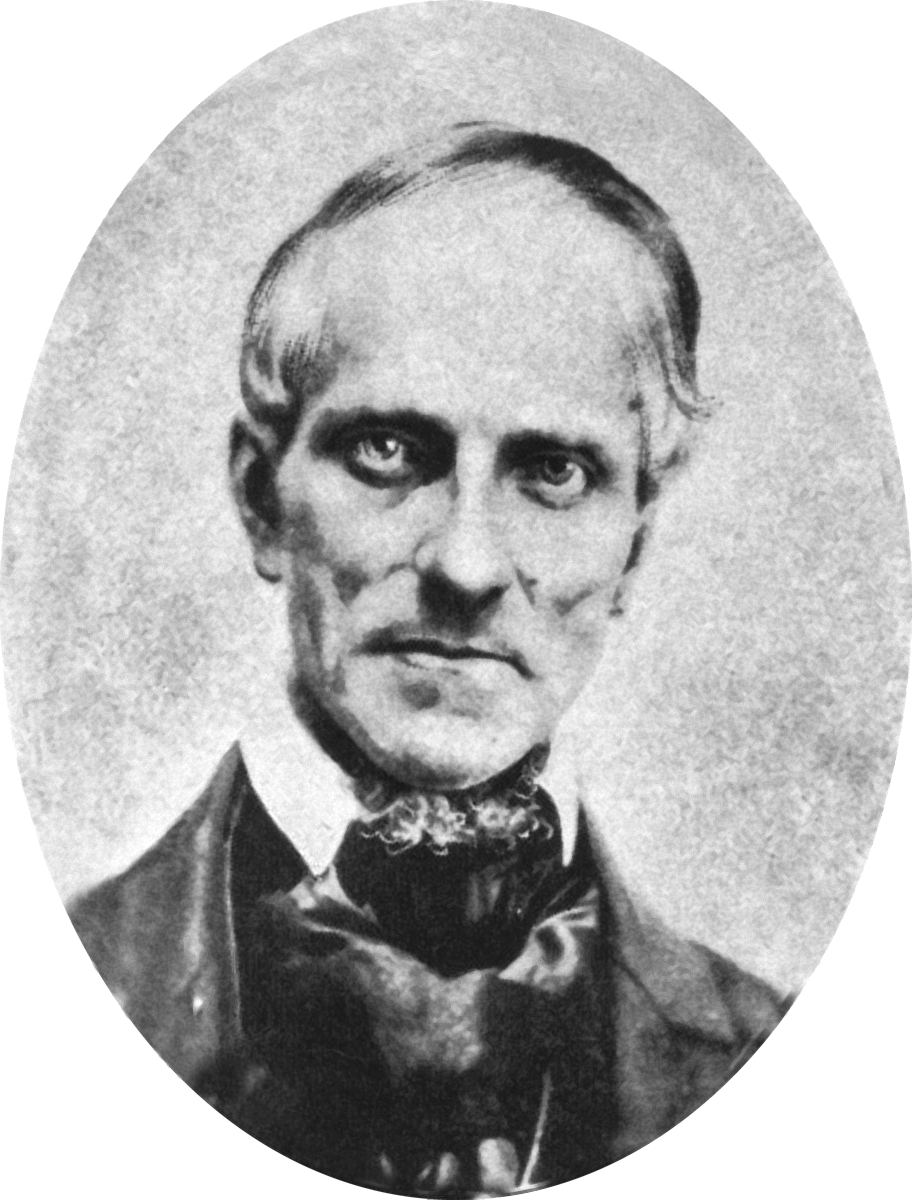

4th Chief Justice of the Minnesota Territorial Supreme Court
- In office April 7, 1853 – May 24, 1858
- Appointed by: Franklin Pierce (term 1); James Buchanan (term 2)
- Preceded by: Henry Z. Hayner
- Succeeded by: LaFayette Emmett in the Minnesota Supreme Court

Personal details
- Born: June 1, 1805 Litchfield, Connecticut, U.S.
- Died: January 23, 1863 (aged 57) Red Wing, Minnesota, U.S.
- Resting place: Oakwood Cemetery, Red Wing, Minnesota, U.S. 44.5544°N 92.5223°W
- Education: Yale University; Yale Law School

William Henry Welch, Sr. (June 1, 1805 – January 23, 1863) was an American jurist.

Born in Litchfield, Connecticut, Welch graduated from Yale University and Yale Law School. He moved to Minnesota Territory in 1850 and settled in St. Anthony (now Minneapolis). Welch served as a Justice of the Peace. From 1853 to 1858, Welch served as Chief Justice of the Minnesota Territorial Supreme Court as appointed by President Pierce. Welch was reappointed for another term by President Buchanan, but his term ended when Minnesota became a State. He moved to Red Wing, Minnesota in 1858 and died there.
