= Oakland Cemetery (Camden, Arkansas) =

Historic cemetery in Ouachita County, Arkansas

- U.S. National Register of Historic Places
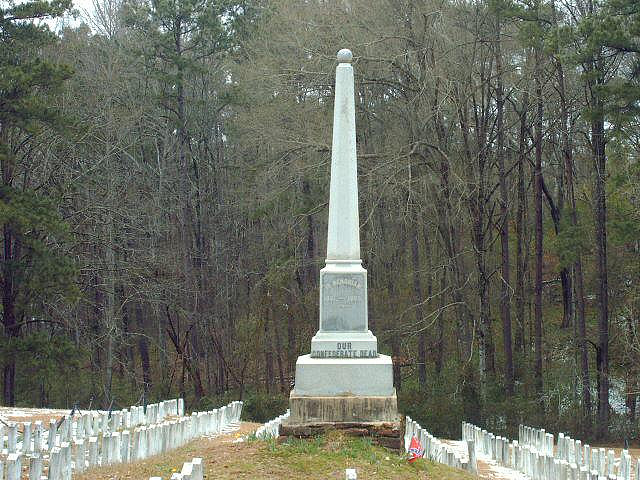
- The Confederate Memorial in Oakland Cemetery

- Location within Arkansas Location within the United States
- Location: 100 Blk. of Maul Rd. bounded by Pearl St. and Madison Ave., Camden, Arkansas
- Coordinates: 33°35′36″N 92°49′59″W
- Area: 7.1 acres (2.9 ha)
- Built: 1830
- NRHP reference No.: 00000634
- Added to NRHP: June 9, 2000

Oakland Cemetery (also known as Confederate Cemetery) is a historic cemetery in Camden, Arkansas, located on Maul Road between Pearl Street and Madison Avenue. Established in 1830, it is the city's oldest cemetery. It consists of just over 7 acres (2.8 ha) of land donated in that year by William L. Bradley, one of Camden's founders. It is the burial site of many of Camden's leading citizens. Among them is James Thomas Elliott (1823–1875), a former Confederate soldier who represented Arkansas's 2nd District as a Republican.

An area of just under one acre which is separated from the rest of the cemetery by a chain fence is reserved for Camden's Confederate States Army fallen, and features a granite obelisk topped by a cannonball. There are 231 graves in this section, including both known and unknown individuals.

The entire cemetery was listed on the National Register of Historic Places in 2000. The Confederate section of the cemetery was separately listed on the National Register in 1996.

== See also ==
- National Register of Historic Places listings in Ouachita County, Arkansas
