= Aaron Goodrich =

American lawyer, jurist and diplomat

The Honourable Aaron Goodrich
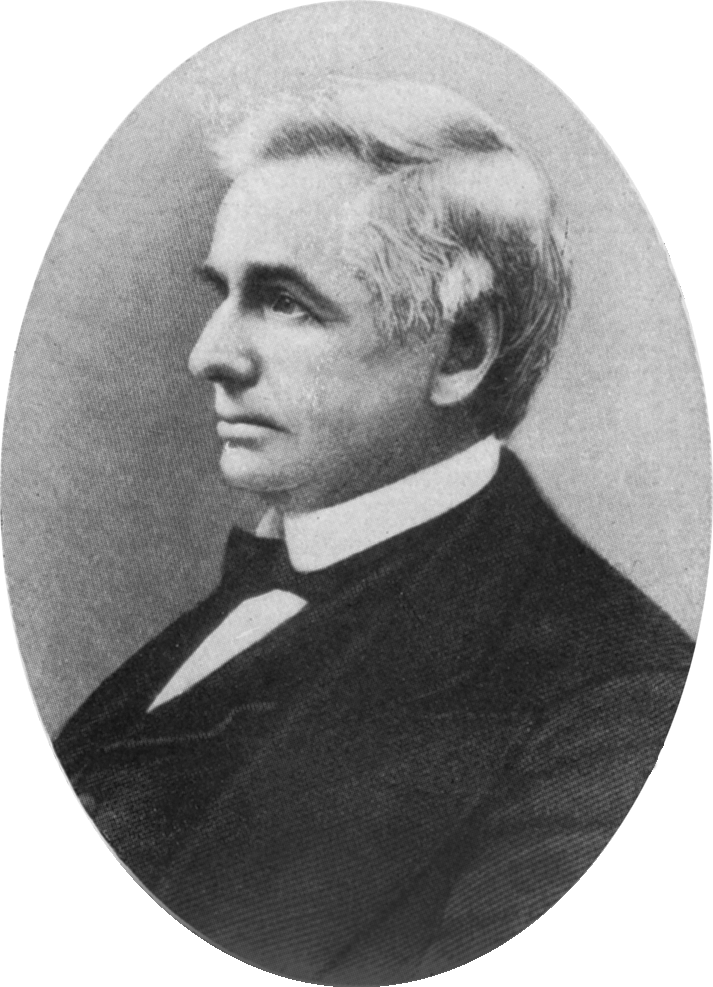
- Goodrich c. 1859 (age 51–52)

1st Chief Justice of the Minnesota Territorial Supreme Court
- In office March 19, 1849 – October 21, 1851
- Appointed by: Zachary Taylor
- Preceded by: Position created
- Succeeded by: Jerome Fuller

Secretary of the United States Legation in Brussels
- In office 1861–1869
- Appointed by: Abraham Lincoln

Member of the Tennessee House of Representatives
- In office 1847–1849

Personal details
- Born: July 6, 1807 Sempronius, New York, USA
- Died: June 24, 1887 (aged 79)
- Resting place: Genesee County, Michigan, USA
- Party: Republican

Aaron Goodrich (6 July 1807 – 24 June 1887) was an American lawyer, jurist and diplomat.

== Biography ==
Goodrich was born in Sempronius, New York, in 1807. In 1815, the family moved to a farm in western New York state, where Aaron attended country school and read law books with enthusiasm. At about age 20, he moved to Stewart County, Tennessee, completed his studies, and began practising the law.

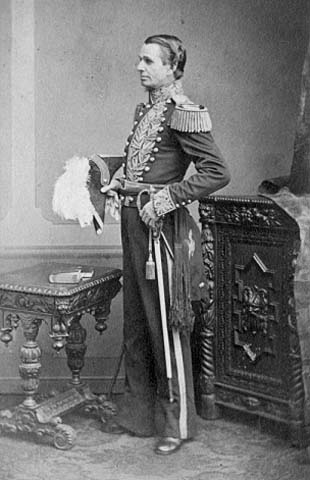
Goodrich, ca. 1860s; photographer noted as being Belgian.

He was a member of the Tennessee House of Representatives from 1847 to 1849. He was appointed as Chief Justice of Minnesota Supreme Court on March 19, 1849, by President Zachary Taylor. He presided over the first court session in Stillwater, Minnesota Territory, in August 1849, deciding 60 cases in six days. However, he failed to see out his four-year term. Several prominent Minnesota attorneys demanded Goodrich be removed for "incompetency, unfitness and improprieties committed on and off the bench", in 1851. After a failed attempt at impeachment, President Millard Fillmore used his executive power to remove Goodrich from office; Goodrich subsequently took the matter to court in an attempt to obtain the salary for the remainder of his term. He was a freemason, and in July 1849, became one of the founding members of the local Masonic Lodge (Saint Paul Lodge Number Three). He was also a unionist, and anti-abolitionist, and a founding member of Minnesota Historical Society and Minnesota Republican Party. Goodrich was a Minnesota delegate to the 1860 Republican National Convention that nominated Abraham Lincoln, but cast his vote for William H. Seward. At Seward's behest, Goodrich was appointed secretary of the United States legation in Brussels, Belgium, by President Lincoln in 1861, remaining there until 1869.

He died on 24 June 1887, and his body was interred at a graveyard in Genesee County, Michigan.

== Memorials ==
- Goodrich Avenue, St Paul, Minnesota. F. Scott and Zelda Fitzgerald lived at 626 Goodrich Avenue from 1921-22 during which time their daughter was born and F. Scott Fitzgerald wrote his novel The Beautiful and Damned.
- The Goodrich campus at St. Paul Academy and Summit School, located at 1150 Goodrich Avenue, St Paul, Minnesota.
- Goodrich cemetery in Genesee County, Michigan

== Works ==
- Goodrich, Aaron (1874). A history of the character and achievements of the so-called Christopher Columbus. D. Appleton and Co.

== Sources ==
- Biography of Aaron Goodrich
- Pederson, Kern. Makers of Minnesota. St. Paul: Minnesota Territorial Centennial (1949)
- Political Graveyard biography
- "The History of Genesee County, Michigan (Chapter XXVI - The Villages of Genesee County, Part II)". Archived from the original on 6 October 2006.
- Greiner, Tony; Howard Mohr (2001). The Minnesota Book of Days: An Almanac of State History. Minnesota Historical Society Press. p. 242. ISBN 0-87351-416-5.
- "Saint Paul Lodge Number Three". Archived from the original on 10 December 2007.
- Schurz, Carl (1907). Reminiscences. McClure Publ. Co. On pp. 143–147 Carl Schurz, then a Wisconsin politician and a recent (1852) immigrant from Prussia, relates his 1859 experiences campaigning on behalf of state office seekers in Minnesota in partnership with Judge Goodrich, whom he referred to as “one of those ‘originals’ who at that time seemed to abound in the new country.”
