= Oakwood Cemetery (Red Wing, Minnesota) =

Historic cemetery in Red Wing, Minnesota

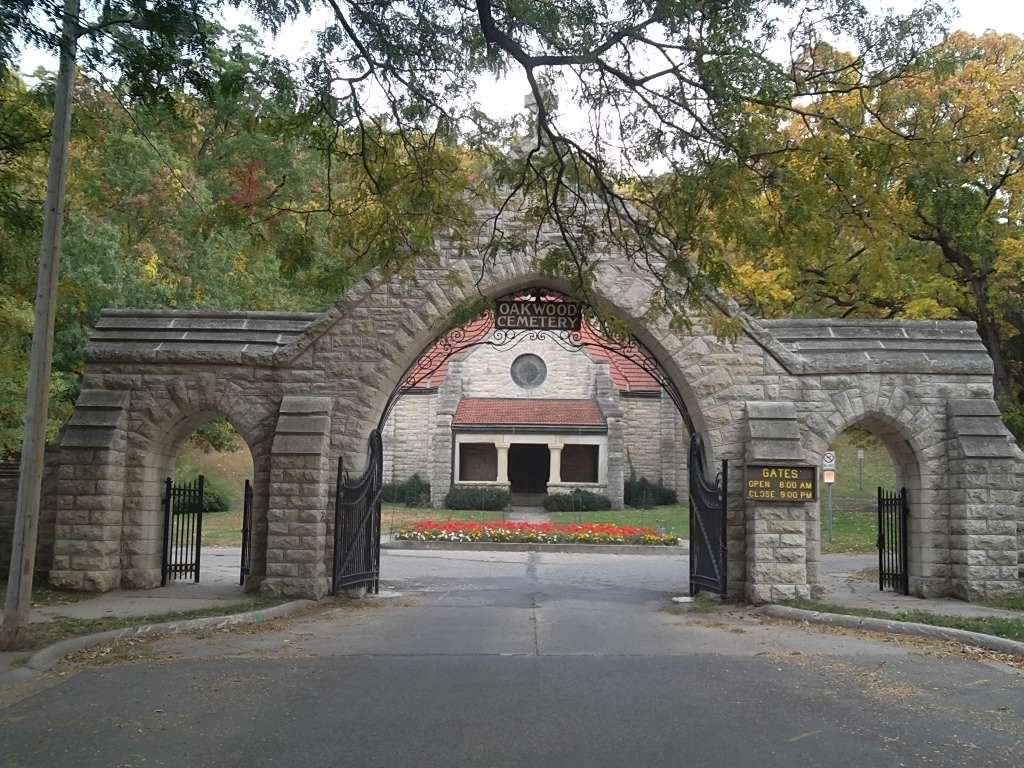
- The gate and chapel of Oakwood cemetery designed by Clarence H. Johnston Sr.
- Interactive map of Oakwood Cemetery

Details
- Established: 1854
- Location: 1613 East Avenue; Red Wing, MN 55066
- Type: Public
- Owned by: City of Red Wing
- Size: 140 acres (57 ha)
- No. of interments: 12,545
- Website: Official website
- Find a Grave: Oakwood Cemetery
- Oakwood Cemetery
- U.S. National Register of Historic Places
- Location: Red Wing, Minnesota
- Area: 60 acres (24 ha)
- Built: 1871
- Architect: Clarence H. Johnston Sr.; Hubert Swanson
- Architectural style: Late Gothic Revival
- NRHP reference No.: 12000005
- Added to NRHP: February 14, 2012

Oakwood Cemetery is a historic cemetery in Red Wing, Minnesota, established in 1854. The cemetery is listed on the National Register of Historic Places for Goodhue County, Minnesota.

== History ==
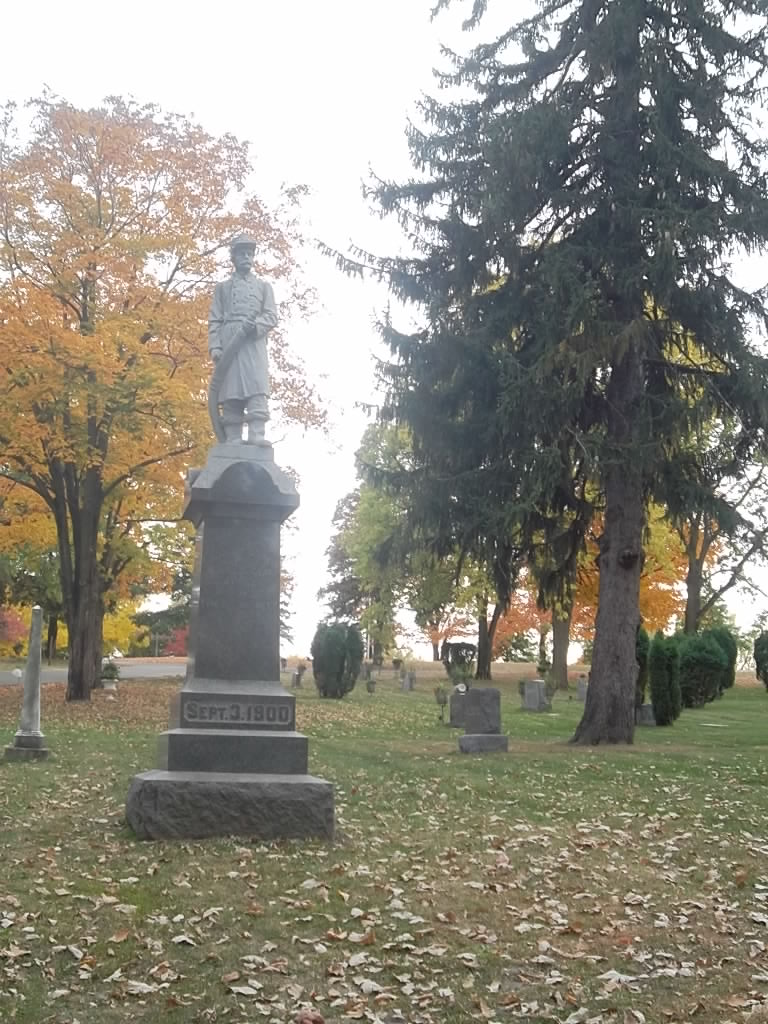
The Fireman's Memorial in Oakwood cemetery

Oakwood cemetery was first selected and platted by Stephen A. Hart and David Hancock in September of 1854.^{:574–575} Previous to the founding of Oakwood, bodies were buried at a nearby bluff overlooking the city.^{:56} Hart and Hancock selected the area of modern-day Oakwood as the area was already used for burials.^{:78} The first person to be buried in Oakwood was Charles Freeborn, the son of William Freeborn, the mayor of Red Wing.^{:574}^{:56} In 1889 Adolph Strauch helped the city to redesign Oakwood following Strauch's "lawn plan" theory. Strauch pioneered the idea of the "lawn plan" system or "landscape lawn", this concept was first used at Spring Grove Cemetery in order to beautify the landscape of graveyards and simplify their design.

In 1900 a Fireman's Memorial was dedicated in Oakwood. Engraved on the memorial are a list of names of individuals who have died while serving the city of Red Wing and Goodhue County. The Blodgett Memorial Arch and the Betcher Memorial Chapel in Oakwood were added in 1908^{:574}^{:183}. The chapel and arch were both designed by Clarence H. Johnston Sr.. The arch was a gift from Elijah H. Blodgett, a local prominent citizen while the Betcher Memorial Chapel was built in memory of Charles Betcher, a local businessman, at the cost of $15,000.^{:574}

== Notable interments ==
- August H. Andresen: American lawyer and politician.
- James Sanks Brisbin: Union Army General.
- Frances Densmore: American anthropologist and ethnographer.
- Orin Densmore: Businessman and politician.
- Lucius Frederick Hubbard: American politician and career military officer.
- Osee M. Hall: Minnesota politician and lawyer.
- Joshua C. Pierce: politician and businessman.
- Oscar Seebach: Minnesota politician and military officer.
- William Wallace Phelps: United States congressman.
- William H. Welch: 4th Chief justice of the Minnesota Supreme Court (1853–1858).
