= Home rule =

Governance of a colony, dependent country, locality, or region by its own citizens

Home rule is the government of a colony, dependent country, or region by its own citizens. It is thus the power of a part (administrative division) of a state or an external dependent country to exercise such of the state's powers of governance within its own administrative area that have been decentralized to it by the central government. Home rule may govern in an autonomous administrative division; in contrast, though, there is no sovereignty separate from that of the parent state, and thus no separate chief military command nor separate foreign policy and diplomacy.

In the British Isles, it is traditionally referred to as self-government, devolution or independence of the countries of the United Kingdom—initially Ireland, and later Scotland, Wales, and Northern Ireland. In the United States and other countries organised as federations of states, the term usually refers to the process and mechanisms of self-government as exercised by municipalities, counties, or other units of local government at the level below that of a federal state (e.g., U.S. state, in which context see special legislation). It can also refer to the system under which the Faroe Islands and Greenland are associated with Denmark.

Home rule is not, however, equivalent to federalism. Whereas states in a federal system of government (e.g., Brazil, Canada, Ethiopia, Germany, Switzerland, and the United States) have a guaranteed constitutional existence, a devolved home rule system of government is created by ordinary legislation and can be reformed, or even abolished, by repeal or amendment of that ordinary legislation.

A legislature may, for example, create home rule for an administrative division, such as a province, a county, or a department, so that a local county council, county commission, parish council, or board of supervisors may have jurisdiction over its unincorporated areas, including important issues like zoning. Without this, the division is simply an extension of the higher government. The legislature can also establish or eliminate municipal corporations, which have home rule within town or city limits through the city council. The higher government could also abolish counties/townships, redefine their boundaries, or dissolve their home-rule governments, according to the relevant laws.

== Denmark ==
=== Faroe Islands ===
The Faroe Islands is a self-governing territory in the Danish Realm. Home rule was granted by the Parliament of Denmark in 1948, after a failed attempt of the Faroese to gain complete independence, with further autonomy granted in 2005. Denmark's monarch is the Faroese head of state. As of June 2024, The Faroe Islands are not part of the European Union, even though Denmark is.

=== Greenland ===
Greenland is a self-governing territory in the Danish Realm. Following a referendum in Greenland where the majority favored a higher degree of autonomy, home rule was granted by the Parliament of Denmark in 1979. After another referendum, further autonomy was granted in 2009. Denmark's monarch is Greenland's head of state. Greenland is not part of the European Union, even though Denmark is.

== India ==
Several nationalist leaders banded together in 1916 under the leadership of Annie Besant to voice a demand for self-government, and to obtain the status of a dominion within the British Empire as enjoyed by Australia, Canada, South Africa, New Zealand and Newfoundland at the time.

While enjoying considerable popularity for some years, its growth and activity were stalled by the rise of Mohandas Gandhi and his satyagraha art of revolution: non-violent, but mass-based civil disobedience, aimed at complete independence. Nonetheless, when Indian independence came in 1947, the new state was the Dominion of India. After three years, the Nehru Government ushered through the permanent Constitution of India creating a republic.

== Ireland ==
The issue of Irish home rule was the dominant political question of British and Irish politics at the end of the 19th and beginning of the 20th centuries.

From the late 19th century, Irish leaders of the Home Rule League, the predecessor of the Irish Parliamentary Party, under Isaac Butt, William Shaw, and Charles Stewart Parnell demanded a form of home rule, with the creation of an Irish parliament within the United Kingdom of Great Britain and Ireland. This demand led to the eventual introduction of four Home Rule Bills, of which two were passed, the Government of Ireland Act 1914 won by John Redmond and most notably the Government of Ireland Act 1920 (which created the home rule parliaments of Northern Ireland and Southern Ireland – the latter state did not in reality function and was replaced by the Irish Free State).

The home rule demands of the late 19th and early 20th century differed from earlier demands for Repeal by Daniel O'Connell in the first half of the 19th century. Whereas home rule meant a constitutional movement towards an Irish parliament under the ultimate sovereignty of Westminster, in much the same manner as Canada, New Zealand, or the much later Scottish devolution process, repeal meant the repeal of the 1801 Act of Union (if need be, by physical force) and the creation of an entirely independent Irish state, separated from the United Kingdom, with only a shared monarch joining them; in essence, Home Rule would see Ireland become an autonomous region within the United Kingdom, while repeal would give the island a status more akin to a Dominion, an independent nation tied to Britain by a shared monarch.

- 1886: First Irish Home Rule Bill was defeated in the House of Commons.
- 1893: Second Irish Home Rule Bill passed by the House of Commons, vetoed in the House of Lords.
- 1914: Third Irish Home Rule Bill passed to the statute books, temporarily suspended by intervention of World War I (1914–1918), finally following the Easter Rising in Dublin (1916).
- 1920: Government of Ireland Act 1920 (Government of Ireland Act 1920) fully implemented in Northern Ireland and partially implemented in Southern Ireland.

Senior Liberals Lord Hartington and Joseph Chamberlain led the battle against Home Rule in Parliament. They broke with the Liberal leader William Ewart Gladstone who insisted on Home Rule, and in 1886 formed a new party, the Liberal Unionist Party. It helped defeat Home Rule and eventually merged with the Conservative party. Chamberlain used anti-Catholicism to build a base for the new party among "Orange" Nonconformist Protestant elements in Britain and Ireland. Liberal Unionist John Bright coined the party's slogan, "Home rule means Rome rule." Ultimately, the Irish Free State was established in 1922 as an independent Dominion sharing the British monarch as head of state, though Northern Ireland was separated from the new state and gained its own Home Rule Parliament which existed until 1972 (The current Northern Ireland Assembly was created in 1998; between 1972 and 1998, Northern Ireland was under direct rule from Westminster).

== United Kingdom ==
=== England ===
English home rule has been discussed in relation to proposals for constitutional changes regarding England following the 2014 Scottish independence referendum.

=== Scotland ===
In a similar fashion to Ireland, supporters of home rule in Scotland have historically desired greater levels of devolved governance within the United Kingdom. Although the term 'home rule' has been largely superseded by "devolution," the home rule movement can be seen as the forerunner to the creation of the current devolved Scottish Parliament.

Administrative devolution was granted to Scotland, with the creation of the Scottish Office, in 1885. In the mid-20th century, the home rule movement became significant, campaigning for a Scottish assembly. Between 1947 and 1950, the Scottish Covenant, a petition requesting a Scottish legislature within the UK, received over two million signatures. It was not until 1979 that devolution entered the political sphere – the 1979 Scottish devolution referendum was held. Despite a vote of 51.6% in favour of devolution, the Scotland Act 1978 was not put into effect due to a requirement that the 'Yes' vote receive the support of 40% of the electorate, which was not met on 63.8% turnout. In 1999, due to the success of a second referendum, the Scottish Parliament was created.

=== Wales ===
The current system of devolution began following the enactment of the Government of Wales Act 1998, with the responsibility of various devolved powers granted to the Welsh Government rather than being the responsibility of the Government of the United Kingdom.

== United States ==
=== District of Columbia ===
The U.S. Constitution gives jurisdiction over the capital city (District of Columbia or Washington, D.C.) to the United States Congress in "all cases whatsoever". This jurisdiction necessitated that the District not be a state, nor part of a state. At certain times, and currently since 1973, Congress has provided for D.C. government to be carried out primarily by locally elected officials. However, congressional oversight of this local government still exists, and locally elected officials' powers could theoretically be revoked at any time.

=== Local government ===
In the United States, some states constitutionally or legislatively grant home rule to counties and municipalities within their borders. These are called "home rule states". Local governments in home rule states are free to pass laws and ordinances as they see fit to further their operations, within the bounds of the state and federal constitutions. In other states, local governments have only the authority expressly granted to them by state legislatures, typically in accordance with the legal principle known as Dillon's Rule. A city charter, awarded by the state, defines the limits to a municipality's powers.

=== Native American reservations ===
The United States federal government provides limited self-rule to some federally recognised Native American tribes over their lands on reservations. Tribal lands are recognised as "dependent domestic nations" and operate a parallel system of governance and law independent of the state(s) that the reservation lies within, often including separate police forces. For instance, some tribes are permitted to operate gambling establishments which may be illegal in the surrounding state or states. Reservations are not states and have no direct representation in Congress, and the citizens vote as citizens of the state by which they are surrounded. Furthermore, unlike the sovereignty of state legislatures, tribal sovereignty and land ownership are not guaranteed by the Constitution and is granted only by an act of Congress, which can be repealed or altered at any time.

== See also ==
- Autonomous communities of Spain
- Basque and Pyrenean fueros
- Federation
- Home Rule Cities Act (Michigan), an example of municipal home rule
- Devolution, the practice of a national power granting specific powers to a region, state, or province
- Municipal home rule, the legal ability in most American states where voters can adopt a home rule charter granting the municipal government greater local control
- Plaid Cymru
- Protectorate
- Scottish National Party (SNP)
