= Oakwood Memorial Mausoleum =

- An inside hallway of Oakwood Memorial Mausoleum in 2016.
- Interactive map of Oakwood Memorial Mausoleum

Details
- Established: 1919; 107 years ago
- Location: 5950 Gratiot Road; Saginaw, Michigan 48638
- Country: United States
- Coordinates: 43.41596°N 84.03412°W
- Type: Private
- Website: oakwoodmemorialmausoleum.com

Oakwood Memorial Mausoleum is a private stand-alone indoor cemetery structure with approximately 15,000 crypts located in Saginaw, Michigan, United States.

== Structure ==
The mausoleum has approximately 15,000 crypts, along with rooms for urns. It is primarily constructed of marble and features marble columns at its entrance.

The initial building was designed by Sidney Lovell.

== Location ==
It is located in Saginaw, Michigan on Gratiot Road near the city's Oakwood Cemetery, although is not affiliated with the cemetery or city government.

== History ==
The mausoleum has been in operation since 1919.

The initial building was designed by Sidney Lovell, and constructed for $264,000 ($4,242,857 in 2025 dollars).
