= Carl Nathorst =

Swedish soldier

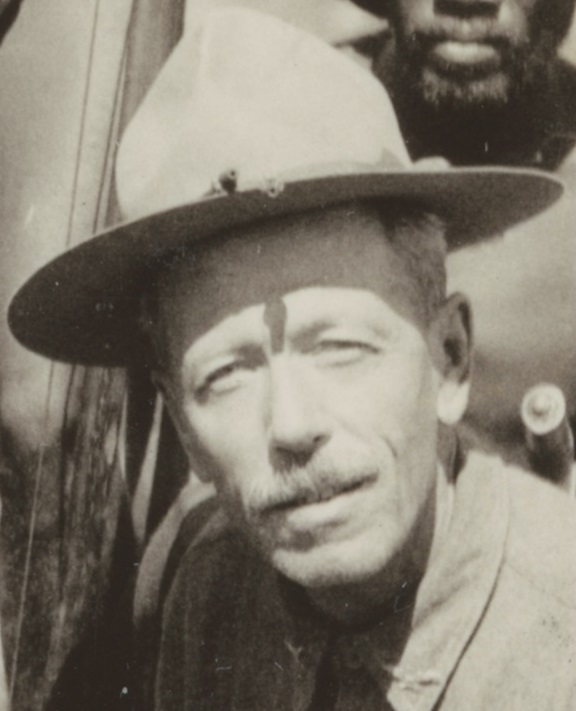
- Born: 20 June 1861
- Died: 1945 (aged 83–84); Manila
- Family: Alfred Gabriel Nathorst

Carl Evert Nathorst (also Charles E. Nathurst, Natthorst; 20 June 1861 - 1945) was a Swedish soldier, living in the Philippines from 1898 to his death in 1945.

Carl was the son of Hjalmar Nathorst and Marie Charlotte Mathilda af Georgii. One of his brothers was Alfred Gabriel Nathorst. He was born in Ödeborgs socken, Dalsland but after just a few months the whole family moved to Alnarp in Scania (Skåne). Carl travelled to Scotland around 1880 to study agronomy, which was the profession of his father. He was in Scotland for 1,5 years. After that he emigrated to the United States in 1882 as a 21-year-old. He worked within the railways for a while. When the Spanish-American War broke out in 1898, he was accepted as a volunteer in The 13th Minnesota Volunteer Infantry. When the unit returned to the United States in August 1899, Nathorst choose to stay in the Philippines and tried to find gold on the island of Luzon. Successful at first, this endeavour soon turned into an economic failure.

On September 23, 1908, he was elevated to the rank of major and on July 9, 1914, he was made a lieutenant-colonel and assistant chief of Constabulary. He was promoted to a full colonelcy on May 15, 1917. In 1901, he was appointed second lieutenant in the Philippine Constabulary, where he became one of the leaders in organizing the United States gendarmerie. The constabulary assisted the United States military in combating the remaining irreconcilable revolutionaries following the March 23 capture of General Emilio Aguinaldo and his April 1 pledge of allegiance to the United States. Nathorst served with distinction in the Cordillera and was organizing the combating and was negotiating peace agreements with the warring highlanders.

In 1927 he became head of the Philippine Police Corps with the rank of brigadier general. In 1932 he left active service, retired and lived in Manila with his wife Lillian Gwinne Trego and daughter. When the Japanese occupied the Philippines in 1942, he was captured and put into prison. After the Americans had started the campaign to defeat the Japanese, Nathorst, his wife and daughter were burnt to death in 1945 in conjunction with the Manila massacre.

In 1934 Nathorst visited Stockholm and donated collections to the Museum of Ethnography. There are also collections from Nathorst at the Museum of World Culture, Gothenburg, and at Malmö museer that were donated already in 1907.
