= Alfred William Bjornstad =

United States Army brigadier general

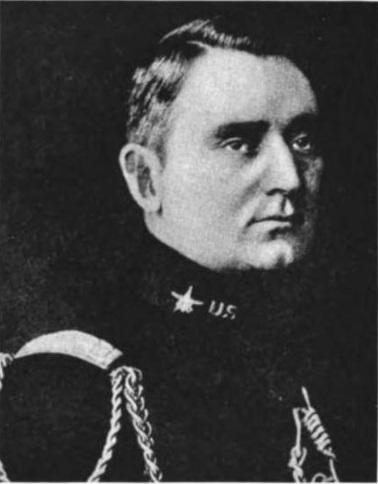
- From The American-Scandinavian Review (November–December 1918)
- Born: October 13, 1874; Saint Paul, Minnesota
- Died: November 4, 1934 (aged 60); Presidio of San Francisco, California
- Burial place: San Francisco National Cemetery, San Francisco, California
- Spouse: Pearl Ladd Sabin (m. 1905–1934, his death)
- Military career
- Allegiance: United States
- Branch: Minnesota National Guard; United States Army
- Service years: 1894–1899 (National Guard); 1899–1928 (Army)
- Rank: Brigadier General
- Service number: 0-615
- Unit: Infantry Branch
- Commands: 13th Infantry Brigade; 53rd Infantry Brigade; 3rd Infantry Regiment; Fort Snelling, Minnesota
- Conflicts: Spanish–American War; Philippine–American War; World War I
- Awards: Distinguished Service Cross; Army Distinguished Service Medal; Purple Heart

Alfred William Bjornstad (October 13, 1874 – November 4, 1934) was an American army officer and brigadier general who served during World War I.

== Early life ==
Bjornstad was born in Saint Paul, Minnesota. He attended Luther College in 1891 and 1892, then attended the University of Minnesota. He joined the Minnesota National Guard as a private in 1894, and worked his way up the enlisted ranks in the years before the Spanish–American War.

== Career ==
Bjornstad received his commission as first lieutenant in the 13th Minnesota Infantry on May 7, 1898. On August 17, 1899, he was a captain of the 42d United States Volunteer Infantry and a first lieutenant, 29th Infantry, by February 1901. He was engaged in thirty-four actions and battles in the Philippines between 1898 and 1904. In 1909, he was an honor graduate of the Army School of the Line, and in 1910 he graduated from the Army Staff College. Bjornstad performed General Staff duty from 1911 and 1912, and from 1912 to 1913 he was the United States military attaché in Berlin.

He then was an instructor at the Army Staff College in 1915 and 1916. In late 1916, he was the professor of military science and tactics at Harvard University. After this he returned to the General Staff. He became a brigadier general on July 12, 1918, with a date of rank from January 26, 1918. Bjornstad then became the chief of staff, Third Corps, followed by duty as commanding general, 13th Infantry Brigade in 1918 and 1919. He participated in all the major engagements in France. During 1919 he was on duty at the General Staff college, and from 1920 to 1923, he commanded Fort Snelling, Minnesota.

Bjornstad belonged to the Masons, and retired in 1928.

== Awards ==
Bjornstad was decorated with: the Distinguished Service Cross, the Army Distinguished Service Medal, and the Purple Heart from the United States. He also was awarded the Order of Saints Michael and George from Britain, and the Croix de Guerre and Legion of Honor from France.

== Death and legacy ==
Alfred William Bjornstad died at the age of sixty on November 4, 1934.

== Bibliography ==
- Davis, Henry Blaine Jr. Generals in Khaki. Raleigh, NC: Pentland Press, 1998. ISBN 1571970886 OCLC 231779136
- Marquis Who's Who, Inc. Who Was Who in American History, the Military. Chicago: Marquis Who's Who, 1975. ISBN 0837932017 OCLC 657162692
