= Home Rule City Act (Michigan) =

Legislation

The Home Rule City Act

Michigan Legislature
- Long title: An act to provide for the incorporation of cities and for revising and amending their charters; to provide for certain powers and duties; to provide for the levy and collection of taxes by cities, borrowing of money, and issuance of bonds or other evidences of indebtedness; to validate actions taken, bonds issued, and obligations heretofore incurred; to prescribe penalties and provide remedies; and to repeal acts and parts of acts on specific dates.
- Citation: MCL 117.1 et seq.
- Signed by: Governor Fred M. Warner
- Commenced: September 1, 1909

The Home Rule City Act was a statute enacted by the Michigan Legislature as Public Act 279 of 1909. It provides the framework by which a new city may become incorporated and provide for its own government by adopting a city charter, and the method by which an existing city may amend or revise its city charter.

== History ==
Local units of government in the United States are created by the various states. Such local governments may go by various names in the several states. It is entirely possible for a state to totally abolish any or all local units of government. In the case of Michigan, the state government is specifically restricted under the state's constitution as to how it may interact with local governments and may not alter the boundaries of a local government without a vote by the affected residents.

The Home Rule City Act resulted from the provisions of the 1908 state constitution, which called for home rule authority to be conferred upon the various local governments in the state. The 1963 state constitution retained these same home rule provisions.

Both constitutions recognized the fundamental integrity of counties, townships, cities, and villages in Michigan. Local governments could no longer be created, abolished, or consolidated without the consent of the electors who reside within the affected territory. Prior to this time, local governments had been created by a special act of the legislature which did not require any consent from those living within the affected territory.

Under Michigan's Revised Statutes of 1848, there were several classes of cities, the primary distinction among which was population. In nearly every case, however, it was the legislature that had provided a city charter for each city that mandated how each city was to be governed and how its officers were to be chosen. Under the Home Rule City Act, each city was given the ability to make changes to its city charter on its own. The charters that had been previously granted by the legislature continued in force until such time as an affected city took this action. All cities in Michigan are now classified under one class, namely, Home Rule Cities, regardless of the source or origin of the various provisions of their respective city charters.

== Revising or amending a city charter ==
Under the Home Rule City Act, a city can amend its city charter by a vote of the electors residing within the city. An amendment can be proposed either by the governing body of the city, typically called the city council, or by an initiative petition signed by a certain number of registered voters.

A revision of a city charter is a more comprehensive process which replaces the existing charter with a new one. The decision to revise a city charter must be approved by the voters of the city and can be proposed by the city council or by an initiative petition. A special commission is elected to conduct the work of writing a new charter and submitting it to the voters for approval. The commission is not bound to keep any provisions of the current city charter.

== Provisions of the act ==
The Home Rule City Act specifies certain requirements that every city must contain within its city charter. At the same time, the Act provides for numerous optional charter provisions. In general, any power that is not specifically prohibited by another law for a city to exercise may be included in a city's charter.
