= 1998 Minnesota Attorney General election =

- November 3, 1998
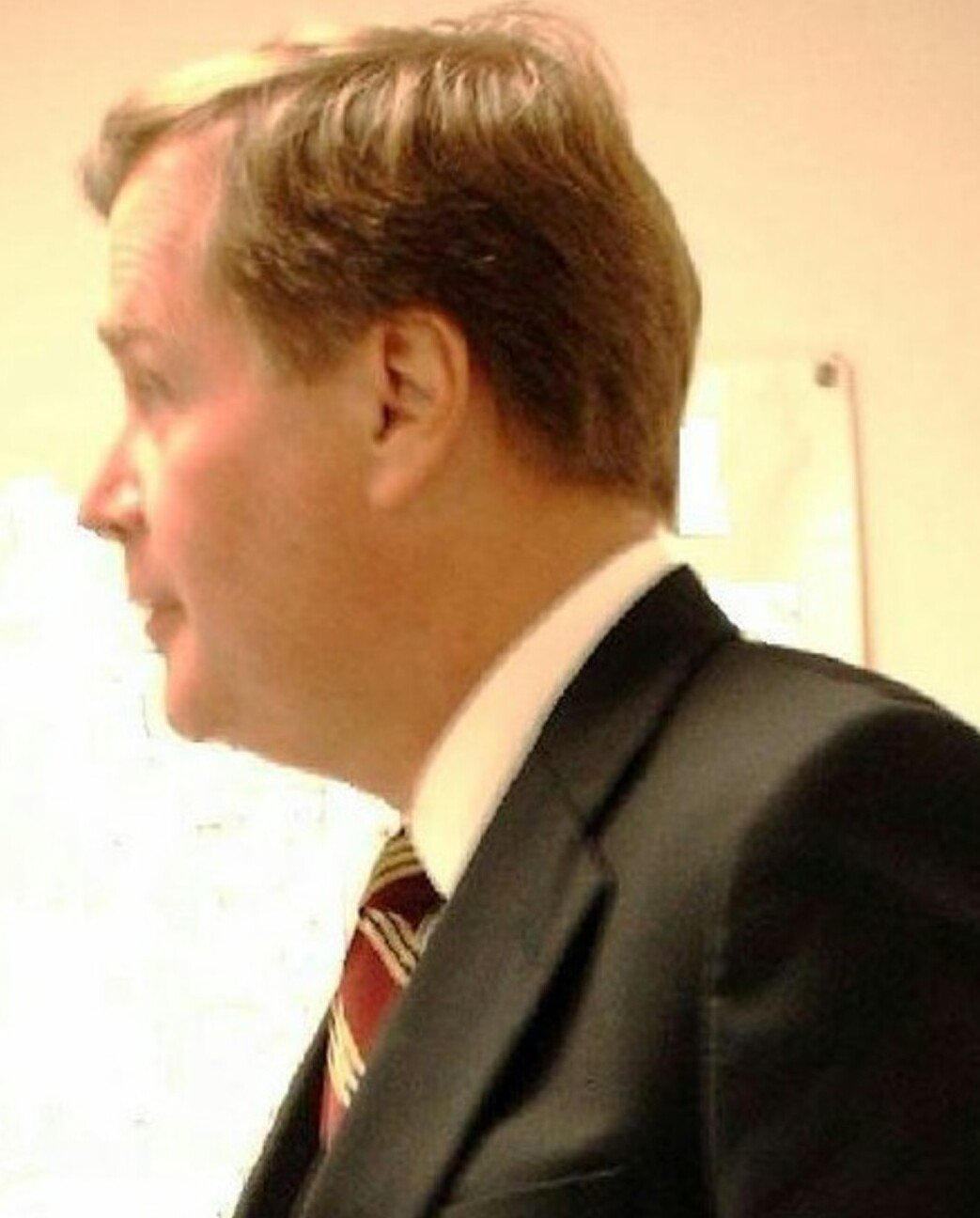

Nominee	Mike Hatch	Charlie Weaver Jr.	Jim Mangan
Party	Democratic (DFL)	Republican	Reform
Popular vote	960,558	880,203	116,504
Percentage	47.8%	43.8%	5.8%
- Hatch: 30–40% 40–50% 50–60% 60–70% 70–80% 80–90% >90% Weaver: 30–40% 40–50% 50–60% 60–70% 70–80% 80–90% >90% Mangan: 60–70% 70–80% Tie: 40–50% 50% No votes
Attorney General before election
Skip Humphrey
Democratic (DFL)
Elected Attorney General
Mike Hatch
Democratic (DFL)

The 1998 Minnesota Attorney General election was held on Tuesday, November 3, 1998 to elect the Minnesota Attorney General for a four-year term. Incumbent DFL Attorney General Skip Humphrey ran for governor, and DFLer Mike Hatch won the election to replace him. The election marked the eighth attorney general race in a row won by the DFL since 1970.

== Democratic–Farmer–Labor primary ==
The primary was held on September 15. Lawyer Mike Hatch won the DFL nomination. Hatch faced off against State Senator Ember Reichgott Junge and former United States Attorney David Lillehaug.

=== Candidates ===
==== Nominated in primary ====
- Mike Hatch, lawyer, former Minnesota Commissioner of Commerce, former DFL Party chairman

==== Elimated in primary ====
- Ember Reichgott Junge, state senator
- David Lillehaug, former United States attorney

=== Results ===
Results by county: Hatch: 30–40%; 40–50%; 50-60%; 60-70%; Lillehaug: 30–40%

1998 DFL Primary Election for Minnesota Attorney General
Party	Candidate	Votes	%
Democratic (DFL)	Mike Hatch	212,278	46.18%
Democratic (DFL)	David Lillehaug	135,636	29.51%
Democratic (DFL)	Ember Reichgott Junge	111,715	24.31%
Total votes		459,629	100%

== Independent-Republican primary ==
The primary was held on September 15. State Representative Charlie Weaver Jr. won the Republican nomination over perennial candidate Sharon Anderson.

=== Candidates ===
==== Nominated in primary ====
- Charlie Weaver Jr., state representative, lawyer

==== Elimated in primary ====
- Sharon Anderson, activist, perennial candidate

=== Results ===
Results by county: Weaver: 50–60%; 60–70%; 70–80%; Anderson: 50–60%; Tie: 50%

1998 Republican Primary Election for Minnesota Attorney General
Party	Candidate	Votes	%
Republican	Charlie Weaver Jr.	83,285	62.08%
Republican	Sharon Anderson	50,863	37.92%
Total votes		134,148	100%

== Other candidates ==
=== Reform Party ===
==== Nominee ====
- Jim Mangan

==== Results ====
1998 Reform Primary Election for Minnesota Attorney General
Party	Candidate	Votes	%
Reform	Jim Mangan	13,906	100.00%
Total votes		13,906	100%

=== Libertarian Party ===
==== Nominee ====
- Ruth A. Mason

== General election ==
=== Polling ===
Poll source	Date(s) administered	Sample size (Note: Key: A – all adults RV – registered voters LV – likely voters V – unclear)	Margin of error	Mike Hatch (D)	Charlie Weaver Jr. (R)	Undecided
Mason-Dixon Poll (Note: Poll commissioned by Minnesota Public Radio, KARE (TV) & the St. Paul Pioneer Press)	October 23–25, 1998	816 (RV)	± 3.5%	44%	31%	25%
Mason-Dixon Poll	October 10–13, 1998	825 (RV)	± 3.5%	35%	28%	37%

=== Results ===
1998 Minnesota Attorney General election
Party	Candidate	Votes	%	±%
Democratic (DFL)	Mike Hatch	960,558	47.83%	−16.84%
Republican	Charlie Weaver Jr.	880,203	43.83%	+15.49%
Reform	Jim Mangan	116,504	5.80%	N/A
Libertarian	Ruth A. Mason	49,162	2.45%	N/A
N/A	Write Ins	1,757	0.09%	−2.85%
Total votes		2,008,184	100.00%	

== Notes ==
Partisan clients
