= 2024 Minnesota judicial elections =

2024 judicial elections in Minnesota

- November 4th, 2024

Nonpartisan elections for several judicial offices in the state of Minnesota were held on November 4th, 2024, concurrent with the United States Presidential Election and other state elections. Minnesota Judges are elected to six-year terms in nonpartisan races, with Minnesota Supreme Court judges elected statewide and Court of Appeals and district court judges elected within various jurisdictions. All but nine elections were uncontested and no incumbent judges were defeated.

== State Supreme Court ==
Two seats on the Minnesota Supreme Court were up for election, and both races saw incumbent justices defeat their challengers.

=== Chief Justice ===
2024 Minnesota Supreme Court Chief Justice election
- November 5, 2024
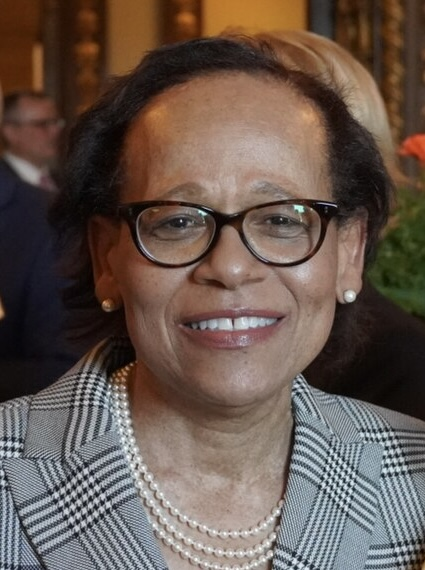

Candidate	Natalie Hudson	Stephen Emery
Popular vote	1,529,063	872,720
Percentage	63.43%	36.20%
- Hudson: 40–50% 50–60% 60–70% 70–80% 80–90% >90% Emery: 40–50% 50–60% 60–70% 70–80% 80–90% >90% Tie: 40–50% 50% No votes
Chief Justice before election
Natalie Hudson
Elected Chief Justice
Natalie Hudson

Chief Justice Natalie Hudson ran for re-election and defeated conservative attorney Stephen Emery with 63.4% of the vote. Governor Tim Walz elevated her from an Associate Justice to the Chief Justice in 2023. She was originally appointed to the court in 2015 by Governor Mark Dayton and won election as an Associate Justice in 2016 and 2022. Hudson was the first person of color to serve as Chief Justice.

==== Candidates ====
- Natalie Hudson, incumbent Chief Justice
- Stephen Emery, attorney and Democratic candidate for U.S. senate in 2018

==== Endorsements ====
Natalie Hudson

Minnesota Supreme Court justices

- David Lillehaug, associate justice (2013–2020)

==== Results ====
2024 Minnesota Supreme Court Chief Justice election
Candidate	Votes	%
Natalie Hudson	1,529,063	63.43%
Stephen Emery	872,720	36.20%
Write-in	9,023	0.37%
Total votes	2,410,806	100.00%

==== By congressional district ====
Hudson won all eight congressional districts, four of which elected Republicans.

District	Emery	Hudson	Representative
1st	39.7%	60.0%	Brad Finstad
2nd	35.7%	63.9%	Angie Craig
3rd	32.7%	66.9%	Dean Phillips (118th Congress)
3rd	32.7%	66.9%	Kelly Morrison (119th Congress)
4th	26.8%	72.7%	Betty McCollum
5th	19.38%	80.1%	Ilhan Omar
6th	44.8%	54.8%	Tom Emmer
7th	45.0%	54.7%	Michelle Fischbach
8th	41.1%	58.5%	Pete Stauber

=== Place 7 ===
2024 Minnesota Supreme Court Place 7 Election
- November 5, 2024
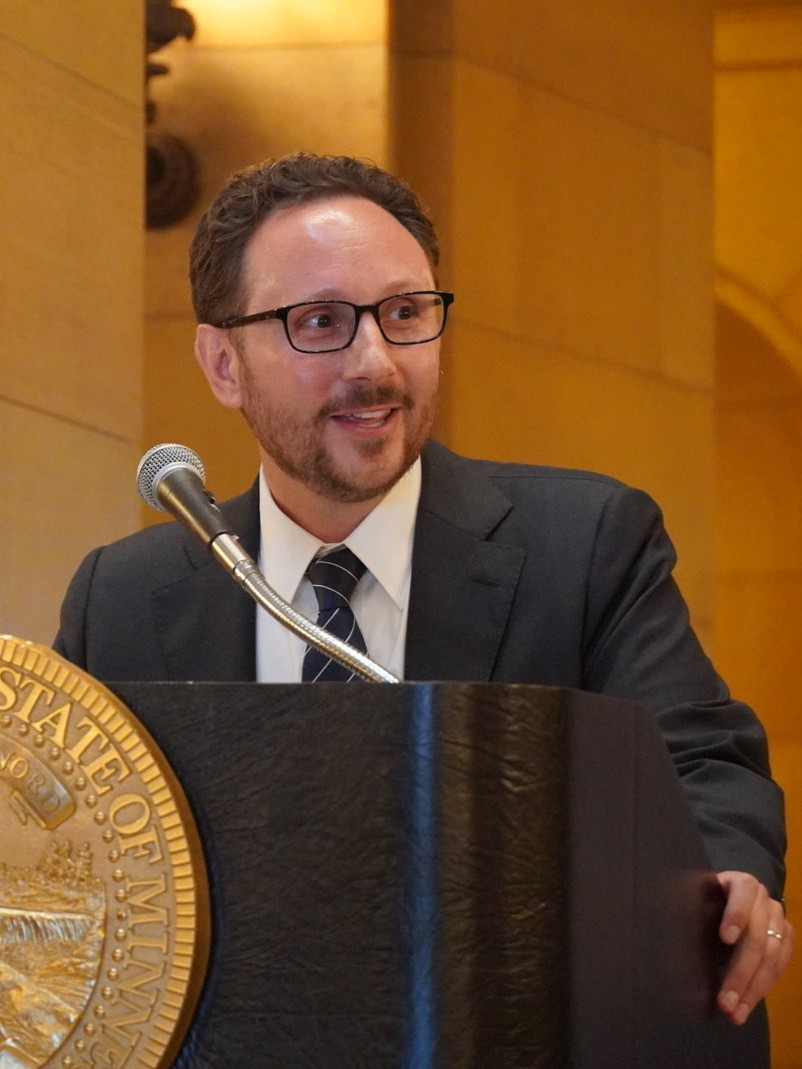

Candidate	Karl Procaccini	Matthew Hanson
Popular vote	1,322,180	1,003,978
Percentage	56.62%	43.00%
- Procaccini: 40–50% 50–60% 60–70% 70–80% 80–90% >90% Hansen: 40–50% 50–60% 60–70% 70–80% 80–90% >90% Tie: 40–50% 50% No votes
Justice before election
Karl Procaccini
Elected Justice
Karl Procaccini

Associate Justice Karl Procaccini, who was appointed by Tim Walz in 2023, defeated attorney Matthew Hanson with 56.62% of the vote. Prior to his appointment, Procaccini served as general counsel to the governor's office during the COVID-19 pandemic while also teaching law at local law schools.

==== Candidates ====
- Karl Procaccini, incumbent Associate Justice
- Matthew Hanson, attorney

==== Endorsements ====
Karl Procaccini

Minnesota Supreme Court justices

- David Lillehaug, associate justice (2013–2020)

==== Results ====
2024 Minnesota Supreme Court Associate Justice 6 Election
Candidate	Votes	%
Karl Procaccini	1,322,180	56.62%
Matthew Hanson	1,003,978	43.00%
Write-in	8,908	0.37%
Total votes	2,335,066	100.00%

==== By congressional district ====
Procaccini won six congressional districts, two of which elected Republicans, while the remaining two went to Hanson.

District	Hanson	Procaccini	Representative
1st	47.48%	52.22%	Brad Finstad
2nd	42.93%	56.72%	Angie Craig
3rd	39.00%	60.58%	Dean Phillips (118th Congress)
3rd	39.00%	60.58%	Kelly Morrison (119th Congress)
4th	33.09%	66.44%	Betty McCollum
5th	24.71%	74.76%	Ilhan Omar
6th	51.28%	48.33%	Tom Emmer
7th	52.18%	47.56%	Michelle Fischbach
8th	47.96%	51.68%	Pete Stauber

== Court of Appeals ==
Seven seats on the Minnesota Court of Appeals were up for election, but only one was contested.

=== Place 12 ===
2024 Minnesota Court of Appeals Place 6 Election
- November 5, 2024
Candidate	Diane Bratvold	Jonathan Woolsey
Popular vote	1,437,341	816,943
Percentage	63.51%	36.10%
- Bratvold: 40–50% 50–60% 60–70% 70–80% 80–90% >90% Woolsey: 40–50% 50–60% 60–70% 70–80% 80–90% >90% Tie: 40–50% 50% No votes
Judge before election
Diane Bratvold
Elected Judge
Diane Bratvold

Incumbent appellate judge Diane Bratvold was re-elected with 63.51% of the vote against attorney Jonathan Woolsey, who did not campaign. Bratvold was appointed by Governor Mark Dayton in 2016 and elected to a full term in 2018.

==== Candidates ====
- Diane Bratvold, incumbent Associate Justice
- Jonathan Woolsey, attorney

==== Results ====
2024 Minnesota Court of Appeals Place 6 Election
Candidate	Votes	%
Diane Bratvold	1,437,341	63.51%
Jonathan Woolsey	816,943	36.10%
Write-in	8,780	0.39%
Total votes	2,263,064	100.00%

==== By congressional district ====
Hudson won all eight congressional districts, four of which elected Republicans.

District	Bratvold	Woolsey	Representative
1st	60.1%	39.6%	Brad Finstad
2nd	63.48%	36.17%	Angie Craig
3rd	66.53%	33.02%	Dean Phillips (118th Congress)
3rd	66.53%	33.02%	Kelly Morrison (119th Congress)
4th	71.91%	27.66%	Betty McCollum
5th	79.53%	19.91%	Ilhan Omar
6th	55.90%	43.69%	Tom Emmer
7th	56.86%	42.86%	Michelle Fischbach
8th	58.46%	41.17%	Pete Stauber
