= Don Hudson =

American football player and coach (1929–2018)

Biographical details
- Born: November 10, 1929
- Died: September 30, 2018 (aged 88); Charlotte, North Carolina, U.S.

Playing career
- c. 1950: Lincoln (MO)
- Position: Quarterback

Coaching career (HC unless noted)
- c. 1960: Lincoln (MO) (assistant)
- 1968–1970: Minneapolis Central HS (MN)
- 1971: Macalester (assistant)
- 1972–1975: Macalester
- 1976–1979: Lincoln (MO)

Administrative career (AD unless noted)
- 1980–?: Lincoln (MO)

Head coaching record
- Overall: 9–72–2 (college)

Donald Edward Hudson (November 20, 1929 – September 30, 2018) was an American football player and coach. He served as the head football coach at Macalester College from 1972 to 1975 and at Lincoln University in Jefferson City, Missouri from 1976 to 1979, compiling a career college football record of 9–72–2.

== Early life, family and education ==
Donald Hudson was born and raised in Pittsburgh, Pennsylvania, the son of a jazz musician. He graduated from Westinghouse High School, having participated in football and gymnastics.

Hudson played college football as a quarterback for Lincoln University, graduating in 1953 with a BS degree in physical education and as a second lieutenant in the US Army Engineers. He served in Korea for a year and a half, then returned to the US and earned a master's degree from Springfield College in Springfield, Massachusetts.

== Career ==
Hudson was an assistant coach at the high school level in Kansas City, Missouri, and his alma mater Lincoln University through the 1950s and 1960s, where he coached basketball, track, and golf as well as football, and taught in the Health and Physical Education Department. He became head coach at Minneapolis Central High School in 1968, where he was the first African-American coach in that school's conference. All the white assistant coaches quit. By his second year coaching, the team had a winning season.

Hudson took a coaching and teaching job at predominantly white Macalester College in 1970. He was promoted to head coach in December 1971 when his predecessor, Dick Borstad, resigned after a 1–7–1 season. Hudson's team went 3–36 during his four seasons as head coach at Macalester. Hudson was the first African-American head football coach at a predominantly white college in the modern era. Macalester College barely publicized the milestone. As a result, other predominantly white schools were subsequently reported to have hired the first African-American head football coach in the modern era: Portland State University with the hiring of Ron Stratten in 1972 and Oberlin College with the hiring of Cass Jackson in 1973. Hudson was recognized for his breakthrough at half time of a Macalester game in October 2007.

Hudson left Macalaster in 1975, returning to Lincoln University to be its football head coach, girls track head coach, and athletic director. He was subsequently athletic director of Smoky Hill High School in Aurora, Colorado, for 16 years until 2000.

== Personal life and demise ==
Hudson and his wife Constance had six children. His daughter Natalie became a judge on the Minnesota Court of Appeals and the Chief Justice of the Minnesota Supreme Court. His favorite food was bananas. In retirement, the couple resided in Charlotte, North Carolina.

Hudson died at age 88 in Charlotte.

== Head coaching record ==
=== College ===
Year	Team	Overall	Conference	Standing	Bowl/playoffs
Macalester Scots (Minnesota Intercollegiate Athletic Conference) (1976–1979)
1972	Macalester	0–9	0–7	8th	
1973	Macalester	1–9	0–7	8th	
1974	Macalester	2–8	1–6	T–7th	
1975	Macalester	0–10	0–7	8th	
Macalester:		3–36	1–27		
Lincoln Blue Tigers (Missouri Intercollegiate Athletic Association) (1976–1979)
1976	Lincoln	0–11	0–6	7th	
1977	Lincoln	0–10–1	0–6	7th	
1978	Lincoln	2–8–1	2–4	T–4th	
1979	Lincoln	4–7	1–5	T–6th	
Lincoln:		6–36–2	3–21		
Total:		9–72–2			
