= Helen Meyer =

American judge

Helen M. Meyer

United States Senator from Minnesota Supreme Court
- In office August 5, 2002 – August 10, 2012
- Appointed by: Jesse Ventura
- Preceded by: Edward C. Stringer
- Succeeded by: Wilhelmina Wright

Personal details
- Born: February 24, 1954 (age 72) St. Cloud, Minnesota, U.S.
- Children: 3

Helen M. Meyer (born February 24, 1954) is an American lawyer and former judge from the state of Minnesota. She served as an associate justice of the Minnesota Supreme Court.

Meyer graduated from the University of Minnesota in 1976 with a degree in social work. She received a J.D. degree in 1982 from William Mitchell College of Law in Saint Paul.

Before her appointment, Meyer worked as a civil trial lawyer and mediator for more than 20 years. Her civil trial practice included mediation and arbitration work. She was the owner of Meyer and Associates in St. Louis Park, since 1996. In 1987, she was a founding partner of the law firm Pritzker and Meyer in Minneapolis. Before that, she was an associate attorney with the Minneapolis law firm Schwebel, Goetz, Sieben and Hanson.

From 1999 to 2002, Meyer was a member of the Minnesota Judicial Merit Selection Commission. The commission makes recommendations on state judicial appointments. She was appointed to the Supreme Court in 2002 by Governor Jesse Ventura, and was sworn in on August 5 of that year.

Meyer joined the faculty at William Mitchell College of Law after leaving the bench. She served on the board of the Mark Morris Dance Group from 2020 to at least 2023.

Legal offices
Preceded by Edward C. Stringer	Associate Justice; Minnesota Supreme Court; 2002–2012	Succeeded by Wilhelmina Wright
