= Margaret Chutich =

American judge (born 1958)

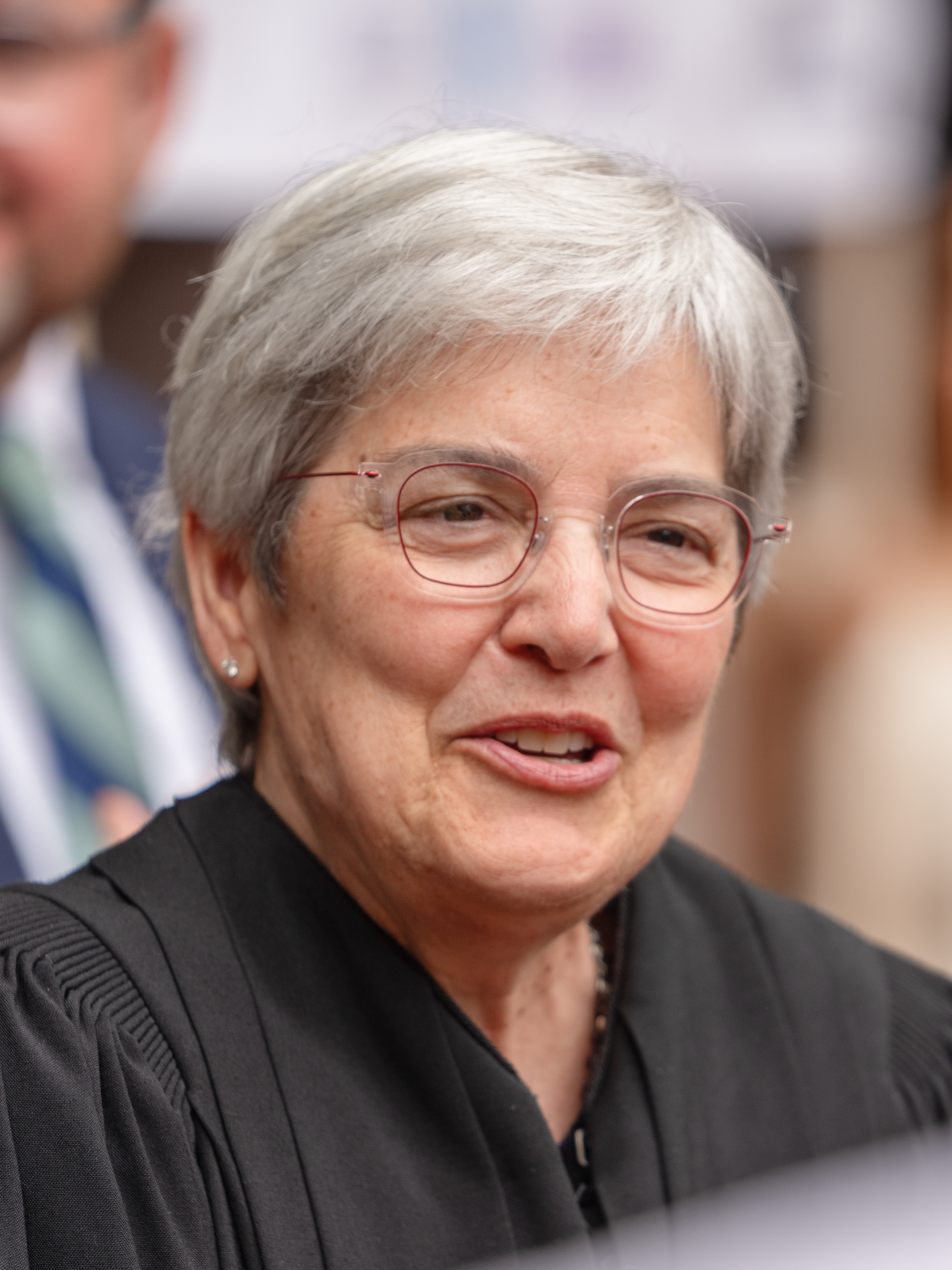
- Chutich in 2025

Associate Justice of the Minnesota Supreme Court
- In office March 17, 2016 – July 31, 2024
- Appointed by: Mark Dayton
- Preceded by: Wilhelmina Wright
- Succeeded by: Theodora Gaïtas

Personal details
- Born: June 18, 1958 (age 68)
- Spouse: Penny Wheeler
- Children: 1 (deceased)
- Education: University of Minnesota (BA); University of Michigan (JD)

Margaret Helen Chutich (born June 18, 1958) is an American lawyer and judge who served as an associate justice of the Minnesota Supreme Court from 2016 to 2024. She was appointed by Governor Mark Dayton. She previously served as a judge on the Minnesota Court of Appeals.

Chutich worked in the office of the Minnesota Attorney General and as an Assistant U.S. Attorney for the District of Minnesota. In 2008, she was appointed assistant dean of the Humphrey School of Public Affairs at the University of Minnesota. In 2011, Dayton appointed her to the appeals court.

Chutich is a graduate of Anoka High School, the University of Minnesota, and Michigan Law. She is married to Allina Health CEO Penny Wheeler, and is the first openly gay justice on the Minnesota Supreme Court. The couple had one child, Olivia Chutich, who was found dead outside a sorority house at Iowa State University on January 22, 2021. She has announced her intent to retire on July 31, 2024.

== See also ==
- List of LGBT state supreme court justices in the United States
- List of LGBT jurists in the United States

Legal offices
Preceded by Wilhelmina Wright	Associate Justice of the Minnesota Supreme Court; 2016–2024	Succeeded by Theodora Gaïtas
