= Theodora Gaïtas =

American judge (born 1970 or 1971)

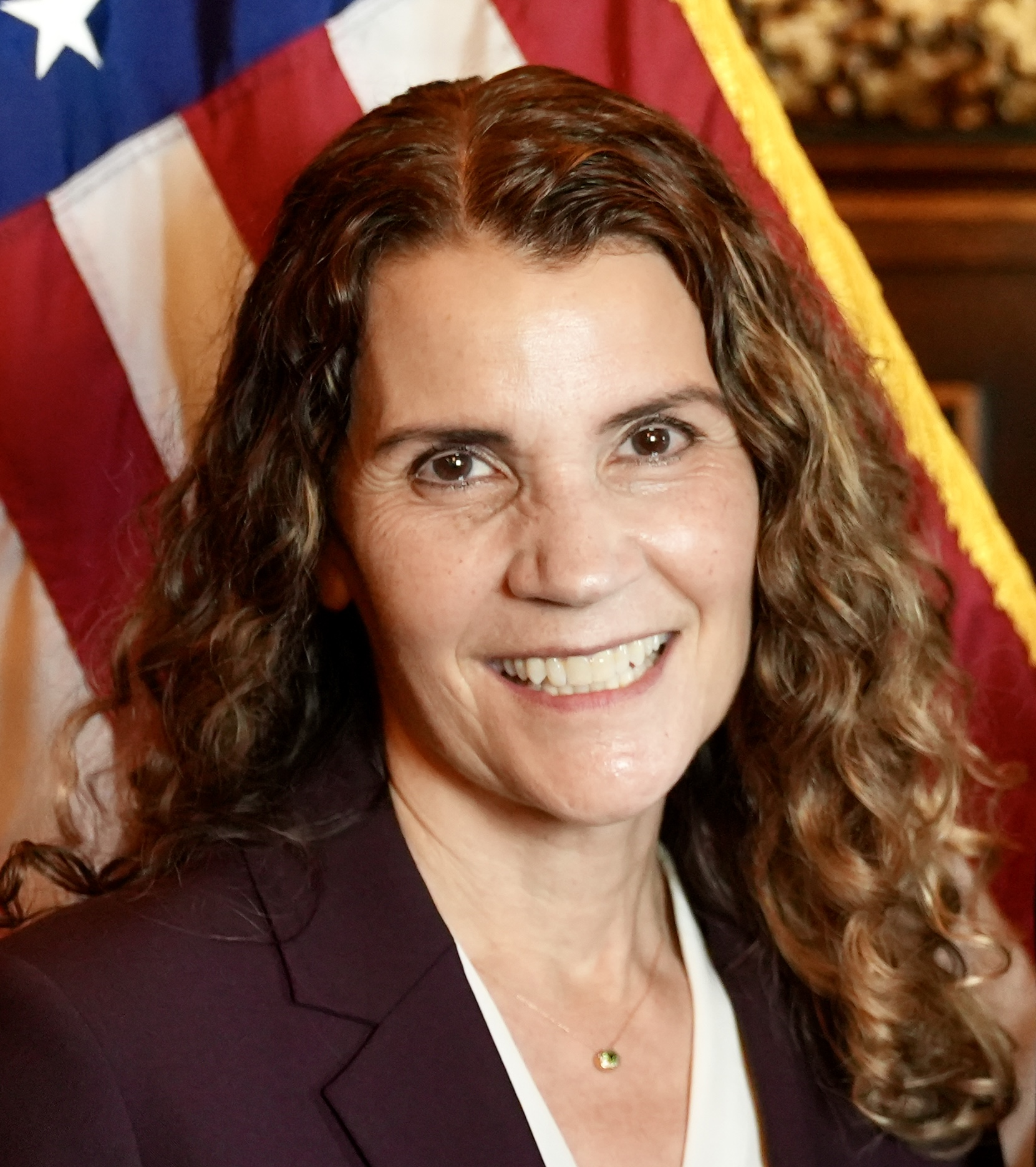
- Gaïtas in 2026

Chief Justice of the Minnesota Supreme Court
- Incumbent
- Assumed office October 1, 2026
- Appointed by: Tim Walz
- Preceded by: Natalie Hudson

Associate Justice of the Minnesota Supreme Court
- In office August 1, 2024 – September 30, 2026
- Appointed by: Tim Walz
- Preceded by: Margaret Chutich
- Succeeded by: Reynaldo Aligada

Personal details
- Born: 1970 or 1971 (age 55–56) Minnesota, U.S.
- Education: University of Minnesota (BA, JD)

Theodora Gaïtas (born 1970 or 1971) is an American lawyer and jurist who serves as the chief justice of the Minnesota Supreme Court. From 2024 to 2026, she served as an associate justice, from 2020 to 2024 as a judge on the Minnesota Court of Appeals, and from 2018 to 2020 as a district court judge in the Fourth Judicial District (Hennepin County).

== Education ==
Gaïtas attended the American Community School of Athens for elementary, middle, and high school, graduating in 1987. She earned a B.A., summa cum laude, from the University of Minnesota in 1991 and a J.D., cum laude, from the University of Minnesota Law School in 1994.

== Career ==
During law school, Gaïtas served as a law clerk in the Hennepin County Attorney's Office. After graduating, she worked as a public defender in Bucks County, Pennsylvania, from 1994 to 1996. In 1996, she returned to Minnesota, serving as a clerk for Judge Robert H. Schumacher of the Minnesota Court of Appeals. Gaïtas then worked as an assistant public defender in the Office of the Minnesota Appellate Public Defender from 1998 to 2013. From 2013 to 2018, Gaïtas was in private practice at Matonich Law.

In 2018, Governor Mark Dayton appointed Gaïtas as a district court judge in the Fourth Judicial District (Hennepin County District Court). She served as a district court judge from September 12, 2018, to August 24, 2020.

In May 2020, Governor Tim Walz appointed Gaïtas as a judge of the Minnesota Court of Appeals. She took office on August 24, 2020, succeeding John Rodenberg, and was elected in 2022. Gaïtas served as an appellate judge from 2020 to 2024, succeeded by Elizabeth Bentley.

On April 22, 2024, Walz announced his intent to appoint Gaïtas to the Minnesota Supreme Court. She was sworn in as an associate justice on August 1, 2024.

On May 19, 2026, Walz announced his intent to appoint Gaïtas the chief justice of Minnesota. She took office on October 1, 2026. Gaïtas is only the second person (after Wilhelmina Wright) to have served as a judge on every level of Minnesota's judicial system, having served as a district court judge, a court of appeals judge, and Minnesota Supreme Court justice. She is the first to serve on all three levels and also as the chief justice of the Supreme Court.

== Personal life ==
Gaïtas's father is a Greek immigrant, and her mother is American. Born in Minnesota, she spent her childhood in Athens and returned to Minnesota for college. She is the widow of Chris Sur, who died in 2023; they have a daughter.

Legal offices
Preceded by Margaret Chutich	Associate Justice of the Minnesota Supreme Court; 2024–2026	Succeeded by Reynaldo Aligada
Preceded by Natalie Hudson	Chief Justice of the Minnesota Supreme Court; 2026–present	Incumbent
