= Reynaldo Aligada =

American judge (born 1976)

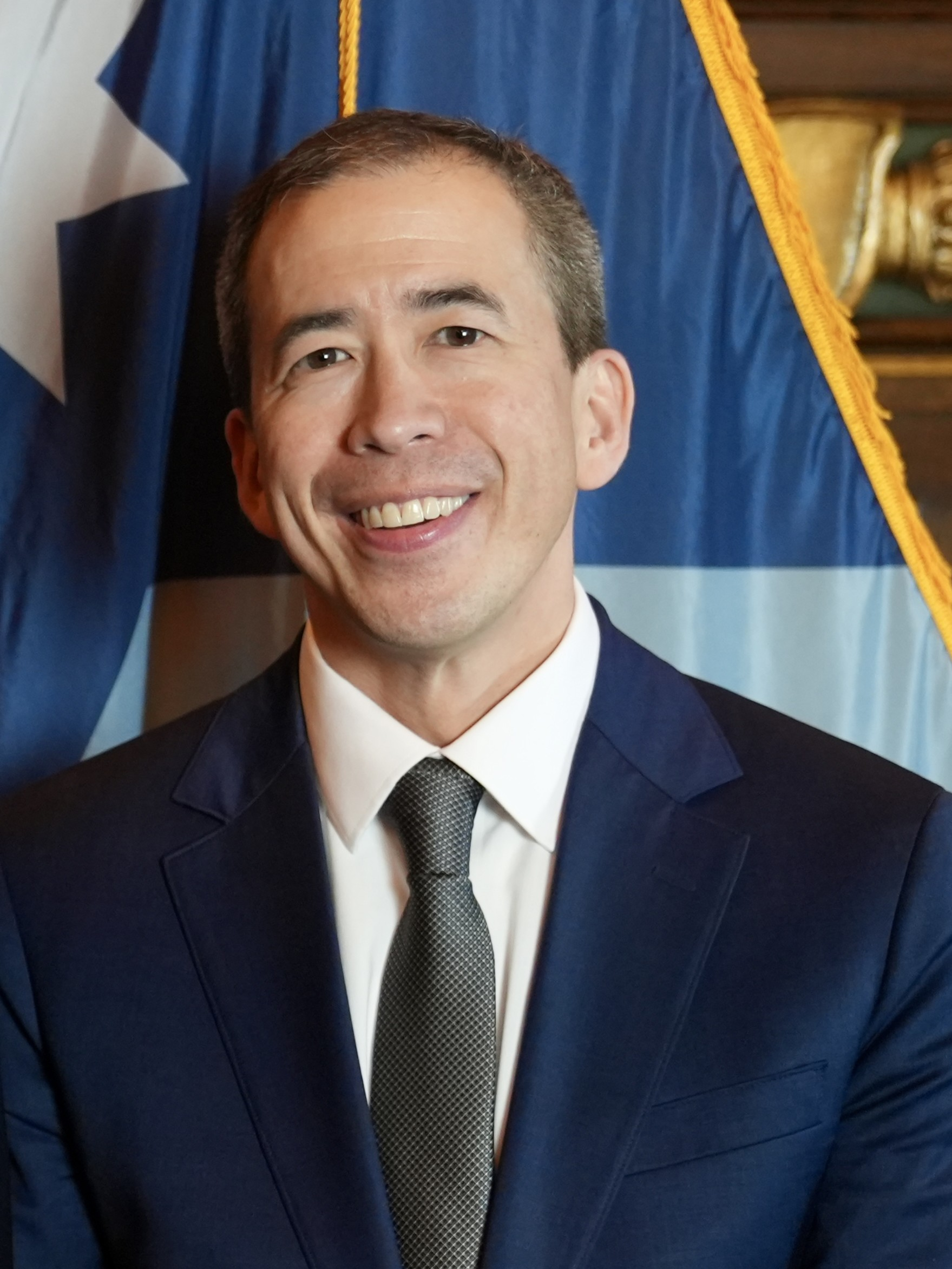
- Aligada in 2026

Associate Justice of the Minnesota Supreme Court
- Incumbent
- Assumed office October 1, 2026
- Appointed by: Tim Walz
- Preceded by: Theodora Gaïtas

Judge of the District Court of Minnesota for Ramsey County
- In office September 23, 2019 – October 1, 2026
- Appointed by: Tim Walz
- Succeeded by: Wesley Abrahamson

Personal details
- Born: July 8, 1976 (age 50) Bismarck, North Dakota, U.S.
- Education: Saint John's University (BA); William Mitchell College of Law (JD)

Reynaldo Aligada (born July 8, 1976) is an American lawyer who serves as an associate justice of the Minnesota Supreme Court. He previously served as a district court judge in the Second Judicial District (Ramsey County) from 2019 to 2026.

== Education and Career ==
Aligada graduated from Saint John's University in 1998 with a B.A. He received his J.D. in 2002 from William Mitchell College of Law (now Mitchell Hamline School of Law). After law school Aligada clerked for Judge Michael J. Davis of the United States District Court for the District of Minnesota and Judge Wilhelmina Wright of the Minnesota Court of Appeals. He worked in private practice as an associate for Robins, Kaplan, Miller & Ciresi, and was a First Assistant Federal Defender in the Office of the Federal Defender. While with the Office of the Federal Defender, Aligada worked on the high-profile Danny Heinrich case, brokering a plea deal that led to the recovery of the victim's remains.

In 2019, Governor Tim Walz appointed Aligada as a district court judge in the Second Judicial District (Ramsey County District Court). In May 2026, Walz selected Aligada as the next new associate justice on the Minnesota Supreme Court, succeeding Theodora Gaïtas. He assumed office in October 2026 and is the first Asian justice to serve on the court.

== Personal life ==
Aligada was born in Bismarck and grew up in Jamestown, North Dakota.

Legal offices
Preceded by Theodora Gaïtas	Associate Justice of the Minnesota Supreme Court; 2026–present	Incumbent
