= Natalie Hudson =

American judge (born 1957)

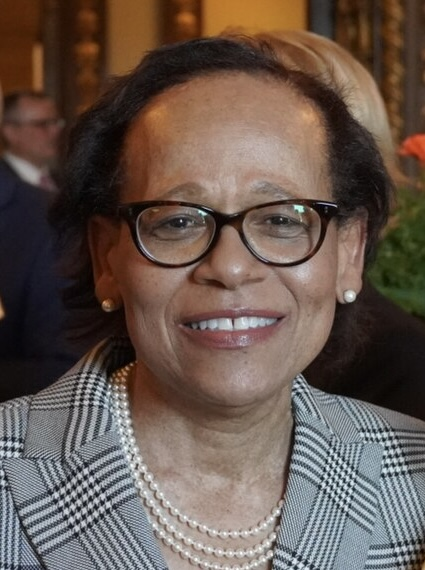
- Hudson in 2023

Chief Justice of the Minnesota Supreme Court
- In office October 2, 2023 – September 30, 2026
- Appointed by: Tim Walz
- Preceded by: Lorie Skjerven Gildea
- Succeeded by: Theodora Gaïtas

Associate Justice of the Minnesota Supreme Court
- In office October 26, 2015 – October 2, 2023
- Appointed by: Mark Dayton
- Preceded by: Alan Page
- Succeeded by: Karl Procaccini

Personal details
- Born: January 13, 1957 (age 69)
- Relatives: Don Hudson (father)
- Education: Arizona State University, Tempe (BA); University of Minnesota (JD)

Natalie E. Hudson (born January 13, 1957) is an American attorney and jurist who served from 2023 to 2026 as the chief justice of the Minnesota Supreme Court. From 2015 to 2023, she served as an associate justice of the Minnesota Supreme Court.

== Early life and education ==
Hudson is the daughter of Florence and Don Hudson. She graduated from Arizona State University in 1979. She then attended the University of Minnesota Law School, where she was the editor-in-chief of the school newspaper, Quaere. From 1980 to 1981 she was on the staff of the Law Review. She earned her Juris Doctor in 1982.

== Career ==
She practiced housing law and worked as a staff attorney with Southern Minnesota Regional Legal Services from 1982 to 1986. She then took a position with the firm Robins, Zelle, Larson & Kaplan as an associate attorney in general civil litigation and employment law. From 1989 to 1992 Hudson was the assistant dean of student affairs at Hamline University School of Law. She then served as a city attorney for St. Paul from 1992 to 1994. Afterwards she served as Assistant Attorney General in the Office of the Minnesota Attorney General, working primarily in the criminal appeals and health licensing divisions.

=== Judicial service ===
Governor Jesse Ventura appointed Hudson to an at-large seat on the Minnesota Court of Appeals on June 3, 2002.

On August 18, 2015, Governor Mark Dayton nominated her to the Supreme Court to replace Alan Page effective September 1; Page had reached the court's mandatory retirement age of 70 earlier in August. She is the second African American woman named to the Court, after Wilhelmina Wright.

On August 23, 2023, Governor Tim Walz announced he would elevate Hudson to Chief Justice, per the announced resignation of Chief Justice Lorie Skjerven Gildea effective October 1 of that year. Hudson is the first woman of color and the first African-American to serve as Chief Justice of the Minnesota Supreme Court.

== See also ==
- List of African-American jurists

Legal offices
Preceded by Alan Page	Associate Justice of the Minnesota Supreme Court; 2015–2023	Succeeded by Karl Procaccini
Preceded by Lorie Skjerven Gildea	Chief Justice of the Minnesota Supreme Court; 2023–2026	Succeeded by Theodora Gaïtas
