= Mike Hatch =

American politician (born 1948)

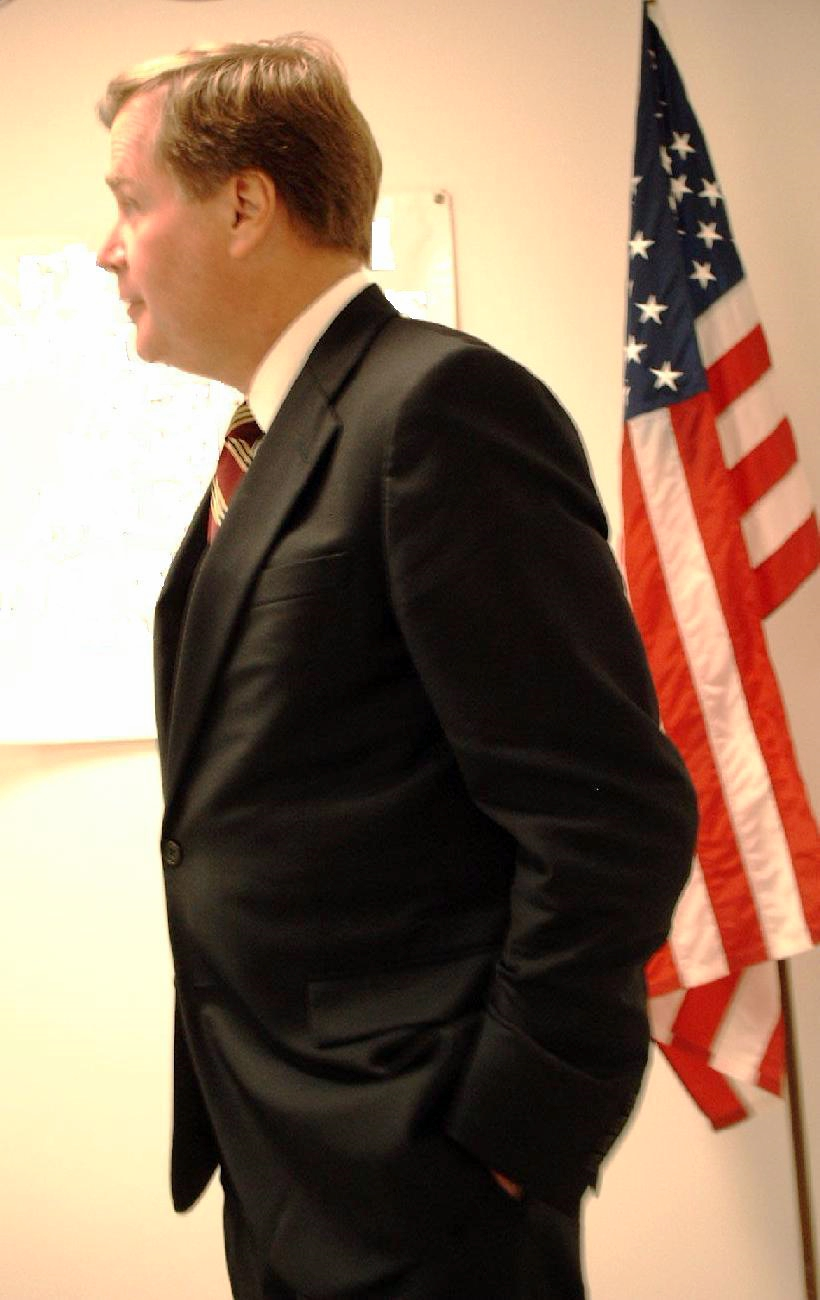
- Hatch in 2006

28th Attorney General of Minnesota
- In office January 4, 1999 – January 6, 2007
- Governor: Jesse Ventura; Tim Pawlenty
- Preceded by: Skip Humphrey
- Succeeded by: Lori Swanson

State Chair of the DFL
- In office 1980–1983
- Preceded by: Claire Rumpel
- Succeeded by: Mary Monahan

Personal details
- Born: Michael Allen Hatch; November 12, 1948 (age 77) Duluth, Minnesota, U.S.
- Party: Minnesota Democratic–Farmer–Labor Party (DFL)
- Spouse: Patti Hatch
- Education: UMD (BA); University of Minnesota (JD)

Military service
- Allegiance: United States
- Branch: U.S. Merchant Marines

Michael Alan Hatch (born November 12, 1948) is an American politician and lawyer. He was the Attorney General of Minnesota from 1999 to 2007, commissioner of the Minnesota Department of Commerce from 1983 to 1989, and chair of the Minnesota DFL Party from 1980 to 1983.

== Early life and career ==
Hatch is a 1966 graduate of East High School in Duluth. In the 1960s, he attended the University of Minnesota, Duluth before dropping out and serving 18 months in the Merchant Marine. There he earned $1.91 an hour shoveling coal into the engines of ore boats crossing the Great Lakes, and made stops in the ports of Rust Belt cities along the shores of the Great Lakes. He was in port in South Chicago during the riots after Martin Luther King, Jr. was assassinated in 1968 and witnessed the clashes between Vietnam War protesters and police during the 1968 Democratic convention. He got mugged at a port in Milwaukee. Hatch later said of this time in his life, "I wasn't political at the time, but I was awakening to this stuff." He got into a scuffle with a ship's officer who made a derogatory comment about Robert F. Kennedy's defense of African Americans. "And that is when I became a Democrat," Hatch said. He hitchhiked to Cleveland, called his father for money to return to Minnesota, and returned to the University of Minnesota Duluth to finish his degree with honors. Of the problems in the Rust Belt cities he saw while working the boats, Hatch has said, "There was despair. I took an interest. I thought, 'you know what, I'm going to do something about it.'"

Hatch earned a Juris Doctor degree from the University of Minnesota Law School in 1973. He was a trial lawyer in private practice in the 1970s and became State Chair of the Minnesota Democratic–Farmer–Labor Party (DFL) in 1980. In 1983, Governor Rudy Perpich appointed Hatch commissioner of the state Department of Commerce, a position he served in until 1989. In 1998, he was elected state attorney general, a position to which he was reelected in 2002, receiving more votes than any previous candidate for any statewide office.

== State Chair of the DFL (1980–1983) ==
In 1976, the Democratic-Farmer-Labor (DFL) was Minnesota's dominant political party. In 1978, the DFL suffered devastating losses in what is known as the "Minnesota Massacre." The two U.S. Senate seats and governorship went Republican, Republicans picked up an additional Congressional seat, and the DFL lost its majority in the state House, ending up with a 67–67 tie. The Minnesota Senate was not up for election in 1978.

The DFL State Chair was elected at the state party convention, conducted in June of each election year. In 1980, the prevailing issue was how the DFL could recover from the devastating loss in 1978. There were six candidates for chair, all but one of whom had significant interest groups or officeholders supporting them. Hatch, the one candidate without significant support from an interest group, ran a geographically based campaign focused primarily on the support of county and congressional district chairs. The convention was tumultuous, with various interest groups opposed to each other over abortion, labor, and farm issues. Hatch, who had the least amount of political experience, campaigned as a centrist who focused on economic issues and promised to elect more Democrats in the 1980 election. He was elected chair on the third ballot.

At the time of his victory in June 1980, the mortgage on the party headquarters was in default and the party had no campaign funds for the 1980 election. Under Hatch, the DFL became the first state Democratic party to acquire a computer and jet printer. He published a monthly newspaper that was printed on the computer and mailed to each contributor of a "Sustaining Fund." In spring 1981, Hatch invited Vice President Walter Mondale and Senator Ted Kennedy, the likely Democratic presidential candidates in the 1984 election, to a "Jefferson-Jackson Day" dinner. Inviting Kennedy to a dinner in Mondale's home state was controversial, but the dinner, with 5,000 in attendance, was the largest and most profitable in DFL Party history.

In 1980, the DFL Party was deeply divided over issues ranging from abortion to gay rights to gun control. The party rules encouraged division by requiring delegates to be elected from "sub-caucuses" organized around specific issues or interest groups. In 1981, Hatch printed political buttons, posters, and letterhead under the name "The Centrists", promoting the idea that the party had to stand for more than just a conglomeration of interest groups. Feminists, pro-lifers, gun control organizations, and gay rights supporters opposed the Centrists, who tried to end the sub-caucus system but were defeated by a coalition of pro-life and pro-choice activists.

Hatch "ran the party with a focus on winning elections and an intense dislike of its internal squabbles." By 1982 the Centrists began exerting influence on party affairs, and the interest groups began to focus on Hatch for organizing the group. Nonetheless, the Centrists remained an influence in the 1982 elections, stifling the intraparty fights between the interest groups during an important election campaign.

A longtime political reporter said of Hatch's tenure as chair: "He worked to rebuild the bitterly divided, debt-ridden DFL Party after its disastrous 1978 election losses. He showed his prowess, both at raising money and organization building. He raised $50,000 to pay off the mortgage and head off the foreclosure on the party headquarters in south Minneapolis, scrounged up another $50,000 to buy a state-of-the-art, 5-megabyte computer the size of a piano, and raised a total of $1.2 million. The DFL is believed to be the first Democratic Party in the country to use the technology of computers, direct mail and telemarketing."

The DFL had a banner year in 1982. It won two additional Congressional seats (5 out of eight), the House of Representatives (77 of 134 seats), the State Senate (42 out of 67) and the governorship. In September 1982 Hatch was instrumental in getting the DFL Party to endorse Rudy Perpich, who defeated DFL-endorsed candidate Warren Spannaus for governor in the primary election. It was the first time that the DFL endorsed a candidate for statewide office who had defeated the convention-endorsed candidate.

In January 1983, Perpich appointed Hatch commissioner of Securities and Real Estate.

== Commissioner of Commerce ==
On December 7, 1982, Perpich appointed Hatch commissioner of the Department of Securities and Real Estate. Hatch's first task was to reorganize the Department of Insurance, the Department of Banking, and the Department of Securities and Real Estate into one Minnesota Department of Commerce. The reorganization was completed in July 1983.

=== Insurance company accountability ===
The Minnesota insurance industry was largely unregulated in 1983. The Associated Press wrote, "Hatch vigorously embraced the role of consumer advocate." One of his first actions as commissioner was to create an enforcement division that eventually handled 40,000 complaints a year from the public. Hatch proposed a series of regulations to protect insurance policyholders. Several dozen new standards to provide fair processing of insurance claims were enacted. These provisions are collectively called the Unfair Claims Practices Act. Legislation providing that insurance agents and companies may not sell policies unsuitable for the policyholder was also enacted. To limit the arbitrary cancellation of automobile policies, Hatch established a point system to determine when an insurer may cancel an automobile policy. He also implemented a set of regulations to stop misleading statements in insurance solicitations. Hatch adopted rules requiring that agents holding themselves out as "financial planners" owe their clients a fiduciary duty. President Barack Obama proposed a similar provision over 30 years later at the federal level. Hatch also proposed that commercial insurers give 30 days' notice of any change in the terms of a commercial policy or increase in rates.

=== Farm crisis ===
Hatch was commerce commissioner during the 1980s farm crisis. In 1983 Minnesota had over 430 banks and savings and loan associations. Most were in rural areas and depended on the success of the rural economy. Interest rates were at record levels, with some banks paying up to 15% annual interest on some deposits. The combination of volatile interest rates and the failure of rural farms affected the banking industry. Farmers could not repay loans, falling grain and land prices shrank the value of collateral, and double-digit interest rates on deposits put banks in an impossible squeeze. Bank examiners forced banks to write down the value of the loan collateral, which resulted in more banks being labeled insolvent and subject to liquidation. This accelerated foreclosures. The depth of the rural recession resulted in few buyers willing to buy used equipment or land at auction, causing further depreciation of farm assets.

Hatch helped enact several laws to help farmers. One was the mandatory Farmer-Lender Mediation Act of 1986, which required lenders to offer mediation with farmers before beginning a foreclosure. Hatch also created an "Interest Buydown Program" in 1985 to pay a portion of the farmer's interest on farm loans. To lessen the regulatory pressure from bank examiners, Hatch directed them to allow banks to value collateral at the appraisal made at the time of the loan. Minnesota also established a rural farm advocate program to assist farmers through the loan process and instituted a voluntary mortgage foreclosure moratorium.

Despite these programs, the Commerce Department shuttered over 25 financially unstable Minnesota banks between 1984 and 1989.

=== Commercial insurance ===
The 1980s financial crisis also affected insurance companies, with commercial insurers doubling and tripling rates to make up for "cash flow" underwriting in the late 1970s. In cash flow underwriting, an insurer undercuts premiums, expecting to make substantial profit on an anticipated investment return of 15% to 20%. The problem was that when the rate of return lowered from 20% in 1980 to 8% in 1984, the loss in anticipated investment profit could not sustain the outflow of cash necessary to pay insurance claims.

The losses sustained by cash flow underwriting were particularly hard on commercial insurers that expected to earn a high profit for many years until claims came due. This created problems for policyholders in securing coverage because few insurers specialized in certain fields of commerce. In 1984, Minnesota had only one liquor liability insurer, two medical malpractice insurers, and few insurers that concentrated coverage in specific areas, such as foster parents or psychologists.

Hatch responded to the doubling and tripling of rates on two fronts. First, he established a Joint Underwriting Association (JUA), which could issue policies to keep an industry operational if there was a shortage of insurers in a particular field, since some industries could not operate without insurance coverage. Second, he undertook several studies of whether the increased premiums had anything to do with increased claims. The St. Paul Companies, based in St. Paul and the primary issuer of medical malpractice policies, argued that Hatch's studies were flawed. ABC Nightline covered the dispute between Hatch and the insurer on February 14, 1989. The televised debate resulted in insurance hearings around the country, with St. Paul Companies dropping its premiums for medical malpractice insurance by 25% on April 15, 1989.

=== Drought insurance ===
In 1988, rural Minnesota experienced a fierce drought. At the time, Chubb Insurance was selling "rain insurance", which paid a farmer if the rain gauge nearest their farm had accumulated less than a certain amount of rain between June 1 and August 31. Chubb's agents were selling the coverage as late as July 15 that summer, halfway through the drought. Farmers stood in line outside insurance agencies to buy the coverage in July.

When farmers filed claims for their losses due to the drought, Chubb responded that it would not pay on the policy, claiming it was essentially a gambling contract having nothing to do with the success or failure of the farmer's crop. The company also disavowed any responsibility for the actions of the agents who sold the coverage. Hatch said the insurer was responsible for its agents' actions and had to pay on the policies.

The dispute between Chubb and Hatch ended up in federal court in Cincinnati, Ohio, with one issue being whether Hatch could suspend Chubb's insurance license if it did not pay on the policies. The court ruled for Hatch, and he was allowed to proceed with a hearing to determine whether Chubb's license should be revoked. Shortly before the hearing, Chubb paid the farmers under the policies.

=== Corporate takeover hearings ===
One of Hatch's early focal points was the regulation of corporate takeovers. The 1980s was a time of high-profile corporate raids around the nation, in which leveraged buyout artists made bids that often resulted in the closure or liquidation of the target company. In 1984, several Minnesota public companies secured enactment of a law that empowered the commerce commissioner to delay a tender offer to acquire securities of a Minnesota public company if the offer did not fully disclose the consequences of the takeover. In September 1984, just two months after the law became effective, Hatch issued the first in a series of orders that scheduled hearings designed to slow down the takeover of local companies, including Scientific Computers, Conwed, Dayton Hudson Corporation, St. Paul Companies, Pillsbury Companies, and Northwest Airlines. The hearings were controversial, with several takeovers thwarted by the hearing and testimony process, including bids for Scientific Computers, Dayton Hudson, St. Paul Companies, and Northwest Airlines. It became apparent that the hearings were interfering with shareholders' rights and serving to raise the bid on the stock being acquired. The takeover hearings largely stopped by 1989.

=== Health insurance ===
As insurance commissioner, Hatch liquidated several HMOs and self-insured health trusts that were insufficiently financed. Insolvent insurers and HMOs included the Duluth Employee Benefit Program, the Minnesota Real Estate Benefit Trust and Plan, More HMO of Virginia, and the LTV Self Insured Trust.

Only a handful of major insurers and HMOs dominated the Minnesota health insurance market in 1987. Blue Cross, PHP and HealthPartners were the dominant players, and all had HMOs that were poorly reserved. PHP, an HMO with 400,000 enrollees, was on the brink of insolvency. PHP had 4,600 medical providers on its panel, over one-third of whom joined a "PHP Oversight Committee" whose goal was to take over the organization. If PHP became insolvent, the other HMOs were not in a position to offer coverage to its enrollees. PHP and the Oversight Committee were engaged in a court fight in Hennepin County District Court, and, to break the logjam, the parties asked Governor Perpich to intervene. On August 15, 1987, Perpich agreed to intervene and appointed Hatch and Health Commissioner Mary Ashton as mediators. Over the next week, the two conducted marathon negotiation sessions culminating in a verbal settlement at 4:00 a.m. the following Friday. The PHP settlement involved a change in the composition of its board of directors.

A Minnesota political reporter wrote that Hatch was "a zealous consumer watchdog in the regulation of banks, insurance companies, securities and real estate firms."

== Attorney general of Minnesota (1999–2006) ==
=== Campaign ===
As an attorney in private practice with his own Minneapolis law firm, Hatch represented over 50 women pro bono in lawsuits to receive coverage from their HMOs for breast cancer treatment. The experience led Hatch to run for attorney general in 1998. He ran as a populist who promised to tackle problems in the health care system and malfeasance by large corporations. His campaign featured TV ads with testimonials from some of the breast cancer patients he had represented. Hatch quickly made health care reform one of his top priorities as attorney general.

=== First six months ===
As attorney general Hatch got off to a quick start in implementing his campaign promises. He had pledged to be an active attorney general who would be the "people's lawyer," not just represent state agencies. A former insurance regulator, Hatch brought complex, heavily litigated lawsuits against major corporations and health care companies throughout his tenure. In March 1999 he filed suit against American Family Mutual for failing to pay for repairs after storms. American Family had initially sued Hatch to keep him from investigating it, so Hatch ended his investigation and sued the company instead. He alleged that the company violated the law when it paid only for the portion of a consumer's roof or siding that was damaged by hail or wind, leaving homeowners with mismatched roofs and siding when the replacement siding or shingles did not match those on the rest of the house. American Family challenged Hatch's standing to file the suit, claiming that only the state Commerce Department could bring such actions. In April 2000, the Minnesota Court of Appeals upheld Hatch's standing to bring the suit. In October 2000, Hatch prevailed in the lawsuit, securing a court order requiring American Family to pay for both the damaged portion of the roofing and siding and the undamaged portion if matching shingles and siding were no longer available.

On June 9, 1999, Hatch drew national attention when he became the first state official in the country to file a lawsuit against a national bank for violating customers' privacy. Hatch sued U.S. Bank, one of the largest banking systems in Minnesota, for entering into a "joint marketing agreement" with 15 telemarketing companies and disclosing to them the names, addresses, account numbers, Social Security numbers, and credit histories of almost one million customers. The lawsuit was resolved on June 30, 1999, with US Bank agreeing to stop the sale of customer data to marketing companies and to pay $3 million. A number of other large banks, including Bank of America and Wells Fargo, quickly announced they would end similar agreements. Editorial boards praised Hatch's lawsuit, with one noting that "the attorney general's action has already had sweeping effect. Bank customers nationwide—and not just U.S. Bancorp depositors—who value the privacy of their accounts and other information are the potential beneficiaries." Hatch later testified in Congress, asking it to strengthen consumer privacy protections. When he tried to enact state legislation to protect consumers’ privacy, 118 lobbyists showed up to oppose his bill. Hatch stayed active in privacy lawsuits. In December 2000, he brought the first case in the country against a mortgage lender (Fleet Mortgage) for selling customer account information to telemarketers.

=== Health care ===
The month before he took office, Hatch announced the formation of a hotline to take complaints from patients with problems with HMOs. In his first month in office, he announced an HMO bill of rights to give patients greater protection from abusive health insurance practices, such as paying bonuses to doctors who limit the number of referrals given to patients.

One of Hatch's most cited accomplishments as attorney general was his lawsuit against Blue Cross and Blue Shield of Minnesota. In October 2000, he filed suit against Blue Cross, the state's largest health insurer, alleging that it routinely refused to pay for treatment for children and young adults suffering from mental illness, eating disorders, and chemical dependency. The suit alleged that Blue Cross told some patients who asked the insurance company to pay for treatment for their mentally ill children that they should instead relinquish their children to the juvenile justice system or foster care. Blue Cross vehemently denied the allegations. When Hatch filed the suit, only six families were willing to be named in it because of privacy concerns for their children. Hatch later expanded the lawsuit to include testimony from many more families and from former Blue Cross employees who said they intentionally declined coverage simply to save the insurer money.

Hatch eventually secured a legal settlement with Blue Cross that created a three-judge panel to automatically review any decision by the insurer to deny mental health care for children. Blue Cross also paid $8 million to reimburse the state for the cost of shifting care onto the state that the insurer should have paid. The settlement required Blue Cross to reimburse families for treatment it had refused to pay, to process urgent claims within 24 hours, to process appeals within one day, to pay for court-ordered treatment, and to cover 28-day inpatient treatment for chemical dependency and eating disorders. At the time of the settlement, Blue Cross said that "we've failed these families in some important ways" and credited Hatch's lawsuit as a wake-up call that forced the company to change its practices.

Mental health experts praised the settlement as a "major step forward in terms of people being able to access the services they need." Hatch soon expanded the settlement terms to apply to HealthPartners and Medica, the state's other two leading health insurance companies.

In 2000, Hatch launched a year-long compliance review of Allina Health System, the state's largest hospital system. Allina at the time owned Medica Health Plans, one of the state's largest HMOs. Allina and Medica are nonprofit organizations. Hatch launched his probe under the nonprofit laws after the federal Centers for Medicare and Medicaid Services found that an unnamed Minnesota nonprofit HMO had spent Medicare premium revenue on sports tickets and other lavish perks for executives. When Allina refused to cooperate with the compliance review, Hatch sued it to gain access to its books and records. He ultimately issued a multi-volume compliance report with hundreds of adverse findings against the organization. Among other things, the review found that top executives at the company spent tens of millions of dollars on golf trips, parties, beachfront condominiums, maid service for executives, spas, image consultants, executive enrichment and unearned executive bonuses, foreign travel, consultants, and gifts. Hatch issued a report stating that conflicts of interest within the organization resulted in Medica HMO's premium dollars being diverted to shore up the financial position of Allina's corporate headquarters, resulting in higher premiums for policyholders.

Hatch urged Allina to split into two companies, separating Medica, an HMO with one million members, from Allina, which ran 19 hospitals and 48 clinics. Three days later, Allina announced that it would split off HMO Medica from its hospitals and clinics. The CEOs of Allina and Medica soon departed. The new Allina chairman agreed that the lavish spending and executive perks were wrong for a nonprofit health care system. Allina and Medica then entered into a regulatory agreement with Hatch to curb conflicts of interest and inappropriate expenditures.

The Rochester Post Bulletin wrote, "Mike Hatch is performing a genuine public service in giving people an insight into some of the spending habits and accounting practices of Allina Health System." The Canby News wrote, "Attorney General Mike Hatch was absolutely within his rights to go after Allina Health System on grounds that golf trips, $800,000 consultant fees, health spas and so on are way outside the lines of delivering health care." The Star Tribune noted that "Hatch has changed the rules of the game for an industry used to a quiet, low-key scrutiny."

Hatch then launched a compliance review of HealthPartners, another nonprofit HMO, in 2001. The yearlong compliance review found that executives ate lavish meals, traveled the world, gave gifts of Waterford crystal, and engaged in inappropriate entertainment spending inconsistent with the mission of an HMO. A Star Tribune editorial from the time said, "It is remarkable that HealthPartners would spend money on exotic foreign travel…or overtly political opinion polling at a time when executives knew that their industry was under scrutiny, and it is imperative that health-care executives understand that Minnesotans expect a higher standard of stewardship." The Rochester Post-Bulletin wrote, "The business practices he cites would be wrong in any company, but they are particularly objectionable in a non-profit company in the health care field." HealthPartners agreed to new spending restrictions and the appointment of a third-party advisor to its board to remedy the deficiencies found in the review.

Hatch then launched a probe of Fairview Health Systems, another hospital system, finding that it aggressively collected debts from patients too poor to pay their bills and did not offer charity care, in violation of its mission as a nonprofit hospital. Hatch obtained a first-in-the-country settlement with Fairview in which it was required to stop using aggressive debt collection tactics, to expand its charity care for poor patients, to give discounts to middle-income families, and to give a third-party monitor appointed by Hatch broad authority to oversee the company's collection practices.

Another oft-cited accomplishment of Hatch's was the 2005 agreement he reached with every hospital in Minnesota over their billing and collection practices. Under the agreement, the hospitals agreed to charged uninsured patients with household incomes less than $125,000, the same discounted prices their largest insurance company got. Before the agreement, hospitals charged uninsured patients up to four times more than they charged insurance companies. The hospitals also agreed to change their debt-collection practices to offer more charity care and give patients greater rights to negotiate payment terms. In a May 9, 2005 editorial, the Star Tribune wrote, "It is good to see Minnesota Attorney General Mike Hatch adopting the uninsured, the orphans of the health care system, and getting them a better deal."

In 2005 and 2006, Hatch conducted a compliance review of Blue Cross, the state's largest health insurer, which found that it had amassed more than $1 billion in financial reserves while raising premiums and shifting costs to consumers. Hatch said at the time, "The obligation of Blue Cross is to provide affordable health care. Their statutory purpose is not to become the wealthiest nonprofit."

Hatch was active in protecting vulnerable patients in care facilities from abuse. In March 2000 he filed a lawsuit against Alterra, a Wisconsin-based assisted living facility, for misrepresenting that it was qualified to take care of memory-impaired patients. The suit was featured in a Time magazine article about abuses at assisted-living facilities. Alterra charged patients up to $4,000 per month, but family members reported patients with Alzheimer's lying in their own feces and urine-soaked garments for hours, and local police frequently discovered dementia patients wandering the streets in the cold. Hatch noted at the time that assisted-living facilities were "essentially unregulated nursing homes," and called for them to be licensed. The state legislature did not act on his proposal, and in 2017 the Star Tribune ran a multi-part investigative special report exposing abuses of patients in such facilities. One of the major legislative proposals following the Star Tribune exposé was that the state license assisted-living facilities.

Hatch also took on pharmaceutical companies. In 2002, he filed a lawsuit against Pharmacia Corporation, making Minnesota one of the first states to sue a drug company for defrauding patients and Medical Assistance by quoting "average wholesale prices" that did not reflect the prices insurers actually paid the pharmaceutical company for its drugs. In 2003, he filed lawsuits against several more drug companies alleging that they misrepresented the prices of inhalers for asthma patients by up to seven times the true cost.

=== 2000–2006 ===
Hatch took on other causes on behalf of the vulnerable. In 2000, he drafted and got enacted the Safe Place for Newborns Act, which allows mothers to take unwanted babies to any hospital for adoption. After 15 people were arrested in multi-million-dollar rings spanning 24 states that solicited young girls for prostitution, Hatch formed a task force to recommend legislative improvements. He secured $6 million in legislative funding for shelters for teenage runaways and prostitutes and drafted legislation that increased penalties for sex offenders.

Hatch wielded the antitrust and regulatory powers of the office to promote market competition and regulate markets that were dominated by monopolies. In August 2000, he was an early opponent of the movement to deregulate electricity, issuing a several-hundred-page report claiming it would lead to higher prices for consumers. The year after Hatch issued this report, California experienced widespread power blackouts and 800 percent rate hikes after it deregulated electricity markets. In 2005, Allina Health System dropped its efforts to buy two cardiology practices after Hatch filed a lawsuit claiming that its proposal would give it a monopoly in local cardiac care.

Hatch handled many constitutional cases as attorney general. In 2001, Minnesota state government nearly shut down when Governor Jesse Ventura and legislative leaders reached an impasse in budget negotiations. Hatch filed a petition to ask a court to order that essential state government services be funded in the event of a shutdown. The court granted Hatch's request, the first time that a Minnesota court had issued an order to authorize the government to continue to operate in the absence of a legislative appropriation. Hatch obtained a similar court order in 2005 requiring the state to continue to fund essential government services during a partial government shutdown that year.

Hatch was an advocate for utility ratepayers. In 2001 he petitioned the Public Utilities Commission to put the brakes on a "no surprise bill" program by Reliant Energy Minnegasco that was marketed as a way for consumers to bring predictability to their home heating costs but resulted in customers paying as much as 20 percent more on natural gas. In 2005 he issued a scathing report faulting CenterPoint Energy for deliberately violating the law designed to protect low-income people from having their heat turned off in the winter. "They violated the law and every standard of human decency," Hatch said at the time. He got the company to reconnect power to 5,000 people. In 2006 he asked the Public Utilities Commission to roll back a rate hike proposed by Xcel Energy after discovering that it was asking for higher rates to collect taxes it would never pay and saddling residents with larger rate hikes than businesses.

Hatch was active in protecting consumers in other sales transactions. In 2002 he won sweeping concessions from several automobile dealers that sold optional warranties and financial products, requiring them to tape-record all sales transactions in which they sold such products. In 2001 he obtained a settlement with US Bancorp requiring the bank to make refunds to customers (one-third of whom were over 80 years old) who were misled into buying long-term 10- and 20-year brokered certificates of deposit, thinking they were regular, short-term bank CDs. He sued the nation's largest maker of bulletproof vests for police officers, claiming the company continued to sell vests it knew would degrade in light. The company later filed bankruptcy.

In October 2002, an airplane carrying Senator Paul Wellstone crashed in northern Minnesota, killing Wellstone 11 days before the state general election. Hatch, a Democrat, worked closely with the state's Republican secretary of state to ensure that people who already voted for Wellstone on absentee ballots would get another chance to vote.

Hatch was reelected to a second term as attorney general on November 5, 2002. Republicans won every other constitutional office that year. He won more votes in that election than any candidate in any previous race for constitutional office in Minnesota history.

After learning that the legislature had appropriated only $10,000 to Governor-elect Tim Pawlenty's transition office in 2003, Hatch voluntarily transferred $250,000 of his budget to help fund the transition. In his inaugural address in 2002, Hatch called for the state not to forget that "there are children who don't always have enough to eat and too many families without health insurance." An editorial said of his inaugural remarks, "Since Sen. Paul Wellstone's death, Hatch is one of the few voices speaking out on behalf of those who have not shared in the nation's prosperity."

Hatch took action against unlawful bill collection practices. In 2003 he filed a lawsuit against Cross Country Bank for selling subprime credit cards with low balance limits to poor people and then harassing them with debt-collection calls. The suit alleged that the bank called some consumers as many as 60 times a week, including on holidays, using profanities and racist epithets. The bank fought the lawsuit to the Minnesota Court of Appeals, but Hatch prevailed, resulting in a precedent-setting ruling that arbitration clauses in consumer contracts do not apply to a lawsuit by the attorney general. In 2004, Hatch sued AT&T for attempting to collect bills from people who did not owe the money. Later that year, he sued two more debt collection agencies, including one that threatened to sue people for debts that were too old to be collected and another that made relentless telephone calls.

Hatch was an early leader in taking to task illegal practices in the real estate and mortgage industries. In 2001 he filed a lawsuit against Countrywide Mortgage for not notifying borrowers of their right to cancel mortgage insurance that cost some homeowners hundreds of dollars per year. In 2003 he filed a lawsuit against a company that engaged in an equity-stripping scheme. The company purchased homes in foreclosure, promising to lease the homes back to the people who, when they couldn't afford the rent, would lose their home equity to the company. Hatch secured a court order barring the company from buying foreclosed homes. In 2005, he launched a probe of Ameriquest for aggressive mortgage lending to people with subprime credit histories. He then reached a settlement with the company requiring it to pay money to 22,000 Minnesota borrowers who were defrauded by aggressive sales practices.

In 2004 and 2005, Hatch challenged Minnesota's efforts to release sex offenders into the public rather than civilly commit them to a security hospital. In 2004 he sued a nursing home that locked vulnerable patients in a ward with sex offenders, some of whom assaulted patients. The Minnesota Department of Corrections sent the patients to live in the nursing home, where they were housed with regular patients amid rat and roach infestations. Employees were instructed to tell residents the rats were "bunnies." The nursing home was shut down.

In 2005 Hatch appeared in court to argue that an insurance company should pay the claim of two little girls who survived an airplane crash that killed their mother in northern Minnesota. One of his former chief deputies said of Hatch's tenure as attorney general: "You could expect his light to be on before eight in the morning and you could expect that he was going to go late into the night."

== 2006 gubernatorial campaign ==
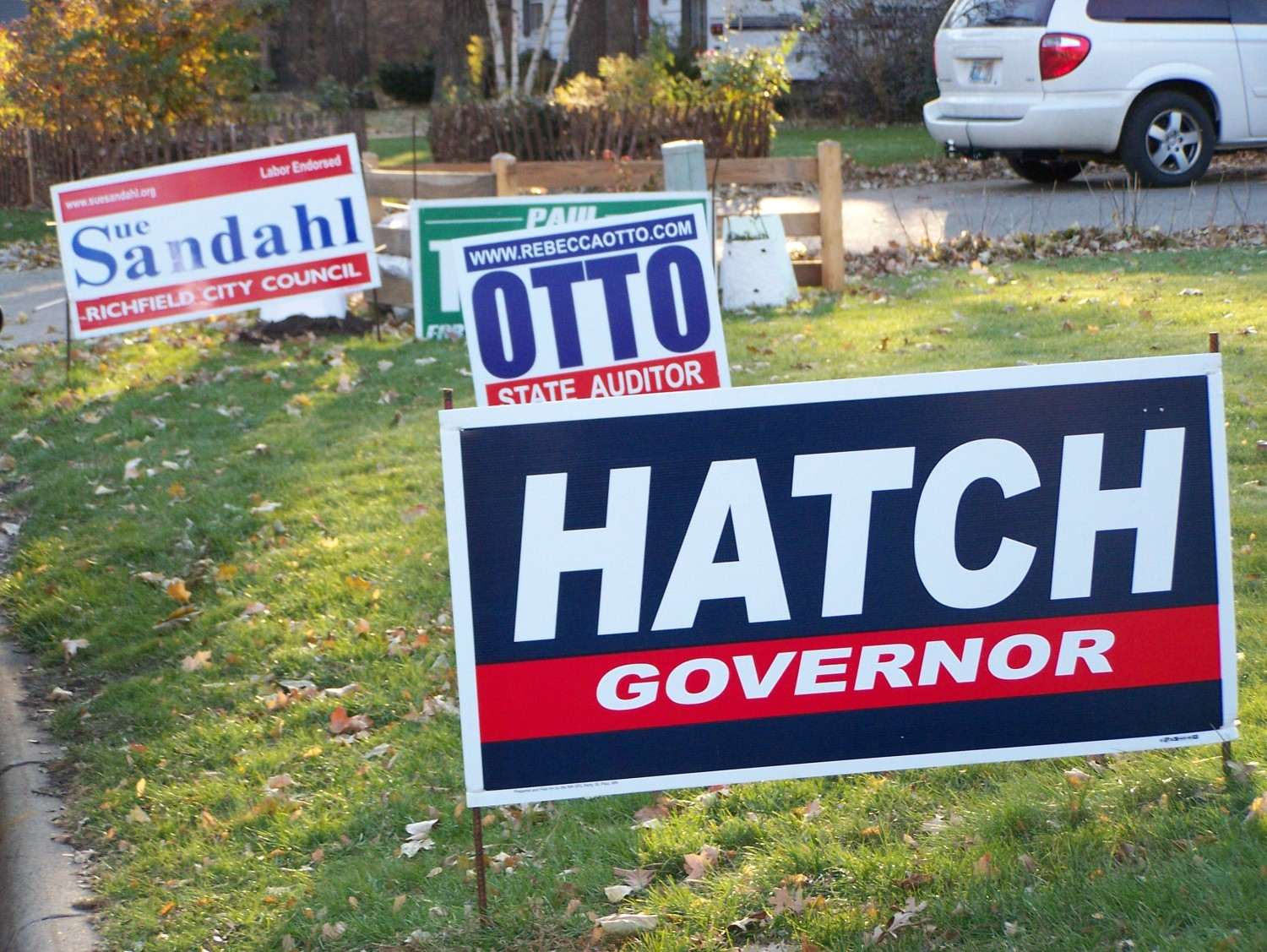
Hatch for Governor sign

Hatch was endorsed in June at the DFL state convention in Rochester, Minnesota. The endorsement was not binding. In the battle for the endorsement, Hatch defeated state senators Steve Kelley and Becky Lourey. Kelley conceded, but Lourey said she would run in the September primary. Hatch selected former state auditor Judi Dutcher (who had left the Republican party in 2000) as his running mate, and won the September primary.

On November 7, 2006, Hatch lost the general election by less than 1% to the incumbent, Tim Pawlenty, in a four-way race that included Independence Party nominee Peter Hutchinson and Green Party nominee Ken Pentel.

Hatch returned to private law practice after his term ended in January 2007. In 2019 he and his successor as attorney general Lori Swanson co-founded Swanson Hatch, P.A., a Minnesota law firm.

== Awards ==
At the 2013 Humphrey-Mondale Awards, Hatch received the Joan and Walter Mondale Award for Public Service.

== Electoral history ==
=== 1998 ===
1998 DFL Primary Election for Minnesota Attorney General
Party	Candidate	Votes	%
Democratic (DFL)	Mike Hatch	212,278	46.18%
Democratic (DFL)	David Lillehaug	135,636	29.51%
Democratic (DFL)	Ember Reichgott Junge	111,715	24.31%
Total votes		459,629	100%

1998 General Election for Minnesota Attorney General
Party	Candidate	Votes	%
Democratic (DFL)	Mike Hatch	960,048	47.83%
Republican	Charlie Weaver	879,864	43.83%
Reform	Jim Mangan	116,481	5.80%
Libertarian	Ruth A. Mason	49,173	2.45%
Write-in		1,757	0.08%
Total votes		2,007,323	100%

=== 2002 ===
2002 DFL Primary Election for Minnesota Attorney General
Party	Candidate	Votes	%
Democratic (DFL)	Mike Hatch (incumbent)	216,309	100%
Total votes		216,309	100%

2002 General Election for Minnesota Attorney General
Party	Candidate	Votes	%
Democratic (DFL)	Mike Hatch (incumbent)	1,197,362	54.64%
Republican	Tom Kelly	894,654	40.83%
Independence	Dale Nathan	96,817	4.42%
Total votes		2,188,833	100%

=== 2006 ===
2006 DFL Primary Election for Minnesota Governor and Lieutenant Governor
Party	Candidate	Votes	%
Democratic (DFL)	Mike Hatch and Judi Dutcher	231,643	73.20%
Democratic (DFL)	Becky Lourey and Tim Baylor	77,430	24.47%
Democratic (DFL)	Ole' Savior and Dan Fischer	7,397	2.34%
Total votes		316,470	100%

2006 General Election for Minnesota Governor and Lieutenant Governor
Party	Candidate	Votes	%
Republican	Tim Pawlenty and Carol Molnau	1,028,568	46.69%
Democratic (DFL)	Mike Hatch and Judi Dutcher	1,007,460	45.73%
Independence	Peter Hutchinson and Maureen Reed	141,735	6.43%
Green	Ken Pentel and Danene Provencher	10,800	0.49%
Quit Raising Taxes Party	Walt E. Brown and Wesley C. Nelson	9,649	0.44%
American Party	Leslie Davis and Gregory K. Soderberg	3,776	0.17%
Write-in		949	0.04%
Total votes		2,202,937	100%

Legal offices
Preceded by Skip Humphrey	Attorney General of Minnesota; 1999–2007	Succeeded by Lori Swanson
Party political offices
Preceded by Skip Humphrey	Democratic nominee for Attorney General of Minnesota; 1998, 2002	Succeeded by Keith Ellison
Preceded by Roger Moe	Democratic nominee for Governor of Minnesota; 2006	Succeeded by Mark Dayton
Preceded by Claire Rumpel	Democratic-Farmer-Labor Party State Chair; 1980-1983	Succeeded by Mary Monahan
