= David Lillehaug =

American judge

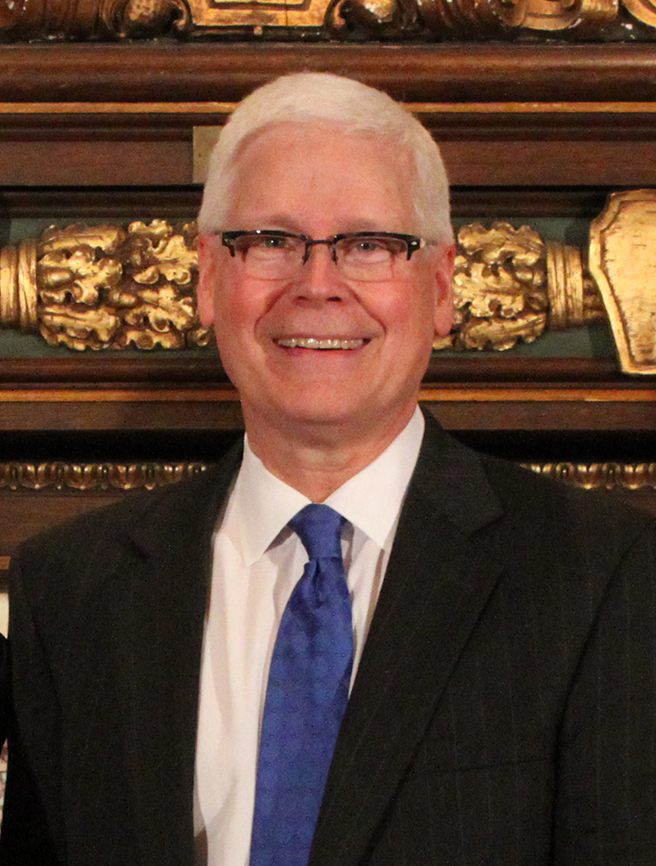
- Lillehaug in 2013

Associate Justice of the Minnesota Supreme Court
- In office June 3, 2013 – July 31, 2020
- Appointed by: Mark Dayton
- Preceded by: Paul H. Anderson
- Succeeded by: Gordon Moore

United States Attorney for the District of Minnesota
- In office January 1994 – May 22, 1998
- Appointed by: Bill Clinton
- Preceded by: Thomas B. Heffelfinger
- Succeeded by: B. Todd Jones

Personal details
- Born: May 22, 1954 (age 72) Waverly, Iowa, U.S.
- Spouse: Winifred Smith
- Children: 1
- Education: Augustana College (B.A.); Harvard University (J.D.)
- Occupation: attorney

David Lee Lillehaug (born May 22, 1954) is a former associate justice of the Minnesota Supreme Court. He served as the United States Attorney for the District of Minnesota from 1994 to 1998.

== Early life and education ==
Lillehaug was born in Waverly, Iowa and raised in Sioux Falls, South Dakota, where his father taught music. He attended Augustana College in Sioux Falls and graduated in 1976 with a Bachelor of Arts summa cum laude. He later attended Harvard Law School, graduating in 1979 with a Juris Doctor cum laude.

== United States Attorney ==
Lillehaug was appointed by President Bill Clinton to serve as the United States Attorney for the District of Minnesota beginning in 1994. He stepped down on May 22, 1998, in order to run for Minnesota Attorney General.

== 1998 Minnesota Attorney General campaign ==
Lillehaug announced on May 27, 1998, that he was entering the race for the Minnesota Attorney General Minnesota Democratic–Farmer–Labor Party (DFL) nomination, joining already announced DFL candidates Mike Hatch and Ember Reichgott Junge. He placed second in the DFL primary that took place on September 15, 1998, losing to Mike Hatch.

== 2000 United States Senate campaign ==
On March 16, 1999, Lillehaug announced that he was entering the 2000 race for the United States Senate DFL nomination in Minnesota. He dropped out on June 3, 2000, after failing to win the DFL endorsement at the party convention that day. After withdrawing, he urged his supporters to support Minnesota State Senator Jerry Janezich, who ultimately won the party endorsement.

== Minnesota Supreme Court ==
Lillehaug was appointed by Governor Mark Dayton on March 26, 2013, to serve as an associate justice of the Minnesota Supreme Court, replacing retiring Justice Paul H. Anderson. He began his term on June 3, 2013, and was formally invested on June 28, 2013. On June 12, 2019, Lillehaug announced a diagnosis of Parkinson's disease and his retirement from the court effective July 31, 2020.

== Personal life ==
Lillehaug is married to Winifred Smith. They have one daughter and reside in Minneapolis, Minnesota.

Legal offices
Preceded by Paul H. Anderson	Associate Justice of the Minnesota Supreme Court; 2013–2020	Succeeded by Gordon Moore
