= Mary Monahan =

American politician (1930–2023)

State Chair of the DFL
- In office 1983–1985
- Preceded by: Mike Hatch
- Succeeded by: Rick Stanoch

Personal details
- Born: May 28, 1930
- Died: November 18, 2023 (aged 93) Eagan, Minnesota

Mary Jean Monahan (née Dickinson) (May 28, 1930 – November 18, 2023) was a U.S. politician from Minnesota.

== Career ==
Monahan ran for the Minnesota Senate in 1982. Despite winning the primary with 65.91% of the vote, she would lose the general election to Howard A. Knutson. She served as State Chair of the DFL from 1983 to 1985. In retirement she served as a 'foster grandmother' with the Dakota County Juvenile Detention Center for 35 years. This was part of an effort by the Lutheran Social Service of Minnesota.

== Death ==
Monahan died on November 18, 2023.
