= Laura Provinzino =

American judge (born 1975)

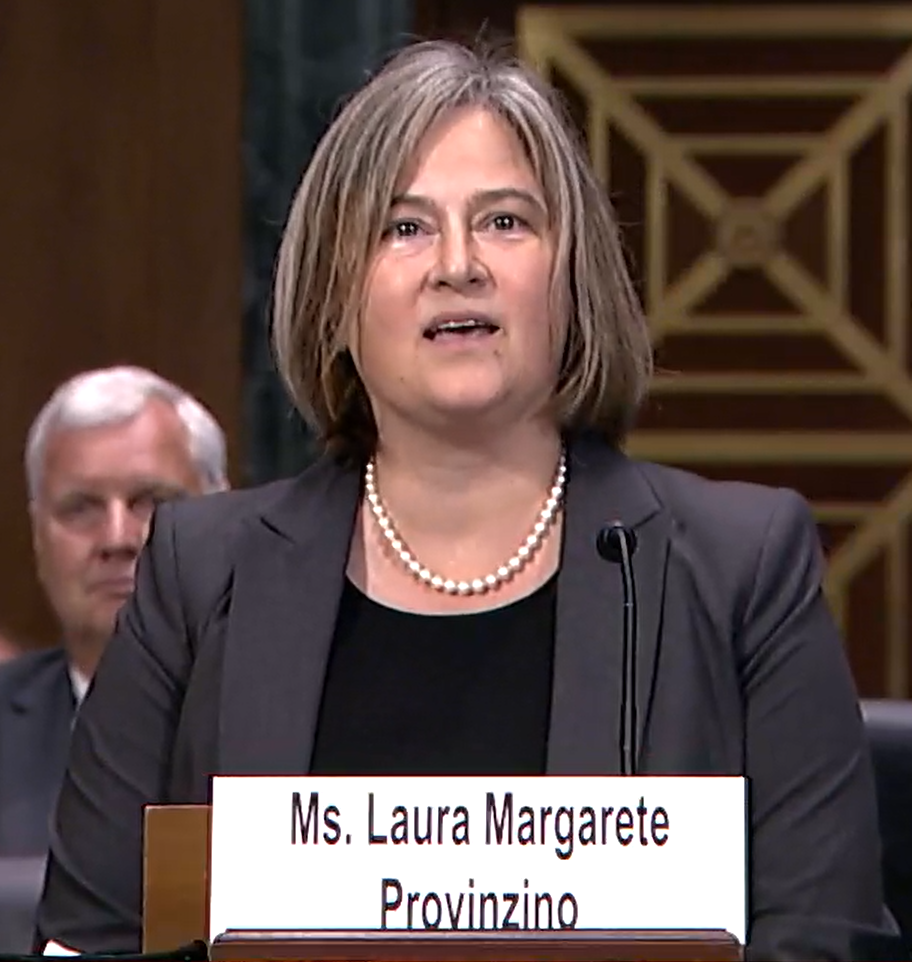

Judge of the United States District Court for the District of Minnesota
- Incumbent
- Assumed office September 16, 2024
- Appointed by: Joe Biden
- Preceded by: Wilhelmina Wright

Personal details
- Born: 1975 (age 50–51) St. Cloud, Minnesota, U.S.
- Education: Lewis & Clark College (BA); Balliol College, Oxford (BA); Yale University (JD)

Laura Margarete Provinzino (born 1975) is an American lawyer serving as a United States district judge of the United States District Court for the District of Minnesota.

== Education ==
Provinzino received a Bachelor of Arts with honors in international affairs from Lewis and Clark College in 1998. In 2000, as a Rhodes Scholar, she attended Balliol College, Oxford, where she studied philosophy, politics, and economics. She received a Juris Doctor from Yale Law School in 2003.

== Career ==
Provinzino served as a law clerk to Judge Diana E. Murphy of the United States Court of Appeals for the Eighth Circuit from 2003 to 2004. After her clerkship, she worked as an associate at Robins Kaplan LLP from 2006 to 2010 in Minneapolis, where she focused on medical malpractice and product liability cases. She served as an assistant United States attorney from 2010 to 2024.

In 2023, Provinzino was one of three prosecutors who tried the case against Anton Lazzaro, who was charged with the human trafficking of several teenage girls. Lazzaro was sentenced to 21 years in federal prison.

=== Federal judicial service ===
On June 12, 2024, President Joe Biden announced his intent to nominate Provinzino to serve as a United States district judge of the United States District Court for the District of Minnesota. She was nominated to the seat vacated by Judge Wilhelmina Wright, who assumed senior status on February 15. On June 13, her nomination was sent to the Senate. On July 10, a hearing on her nomination was held before the Senate Judiciary Committee. On August 1, her nomination was reported out of committee by a 12–8 vote. On September 11, the United States Senate invoked cloture on her nomination by a 55–39 vote. On September 12, Provinzino was confirmed by a 54–41 vote. She received her judicial commission on September 16.

Legal offices
Preceded by Wilhelmina Wright	Judge of the United States District Court for the District of Minnesota; 2024–present	Incumbent
