= Gordon Moore (judge) =

American judge (born 1963)

Associate Justice of the Minnesota Supreme Court
- Incumbent
- Assumed office August 3, 2020
- Appointed by: Tim Walz
- Preceded by: David Lillehaug

Personal details
- Born: April 6, 1963 (age 63)
- Education: Carleton College (BA); University of Iowa (JD)

Gordon L. Moore III (born April 6, 1963) is an American lawyer who serves as an associate justice of the Minnesota Supreme Court. He previously was a district court judge (Fifth District) in Nobles County from 2012 to 2020.

== Early life and education ==
Moore grew up in Rochester and graduated from Mayo High School. He lived in Northfield and Mankato before moving to Worthington to raise a family in 1995. He received a Bachelor of Arts from Carleton College in 1985 and his Juris Doctor, with honors, from the University of Iowa College of Law in 1988.

== Legal career ==
Moore was an associate attorney with the Worthington law office of Von Holtum, Malters & Shepherd, and served as Worthington's assistant city attorney. Before becoming Nobles County attorney, he served as a special assistant and assistant attorney general under Attorney General of Minnesota Skip Humphrey and was an associate and assistant city attorney in Worthington.

== State judicial service ==
On January 18, 2012, Governor Mark Dayton appointed Moore to the Minnesota Fifth Judicial District Court to the seat vacated by Judge Jeffrey L. Flynn, who retired. He was sworn in on March 1, 2012.

== Appointment to Minnesota Supreme Court ==
Moore was one of four candidates considered by Governor Tim Walz, along with Court of Appeals Judges Diane Bratvold and Jeffrey Bryan, and Chief Deputy Attorney General John Keller. On May 15, 2020, Walz appointed Moore to the Minnesota Supreme Court. He filled the vacancy left by the retirement of Justice David Lillehaug.

Legal offices
Preceded by David Lillehaug	Associate Justice of the Minnesota Supreme Court; 2020–present	Incumbent
