= American Community School of Athens =

ACS Athens (American Community Schools of Athens)

Location
- 129 Aghias Paraskevis Ave. & Kazantzaki Street; Chalandri, Athens, 15234; Greece; 38.018221°N 23.815459°E

Information
- Type: Private, independent, American, international
- Established: 1945; 81 years ago
- President: Peggy Pelonis
- Principal: Dr. Harry Leonardatos (Academy)
- Principal: Matina Stergiopoulos (Middle School)
- Principal: Dora Andrikopoulos (Elementary School)
- Faculty: 125
- Grades: K–12
- Enrollment: 1186 (2024-25)
- Colors: Blue and gold
- Mascot: The Lancer
- Accreditation: Middle States Association of Colleges and Schools, International Baccalaureate Organization IBO International Baccalaureate, College Board
- Publication: ACS Athens Ethos
- Newspaper: The Observer Student Online Portal
- Yearbook: Academy: The Evzone; Middle School: Hermes
- Affiliation: Near East South Asia Council of Overseas Schools, Educational Collaborative for International Schools, Mediterranean Association of International Schools, Association for Middle Level Education
- Website: www.acs.gr

ACS Athens – American Community Schools of Athens is a private school offering international JK–12 education to local, national and international students in Greece. ACS Athens embraces American educational philosophy, principles and values.

It is located in Chalandri in the Athens area.

== History ==
In 1946, the British Army School was established in several homes in the Glyfada area of Athens to educate the children of British military personnel who were stationed in Greece at the close of the Second World War. The history of ACS Athens begins here; for shortly after its inauguration, the school began to admit British and American civilians. In 1949, many more American children arrived in Greece, and a high school was opened for them in Kolonaki. Also established was an elementary school, in Psychico, which was later moved to a facility in Filothei. The British Army School had metamorphosed into the Anglo-American school.

The first yearbook of the new school, The Evzone, published in 1952, highlights the accomplishments of a graduating class of six seniors who had graduated from a school that now occupied a rented villa in Kifissia. This house, complete with towers and turrets, served as the school's home until 1961. The same yearbook also documents the activities of Junior School students in a facility in Kalamaki, which would serve as the home of the Junior School until its operations were transferred to a building on the American base later in the decade following an airplane accident.

The 1954–1955 school year marked another milestone in the history of the school. Chartered in the state of Delaware as a private, non-profit educational institution for the children of American diplomatic and military personnel, the Anglo-American School became the American Community Schools of Athens. From its inception, the school received no official subsidies, and its operations were funded by tuition fees. In December 1960, the ACS Athens School Board obtained funds under Public Law 480 to purchase land in Halandri, then a sleepy farming area, and began construction of a new school facility. The Class of 1962 was the first to graduate from the new facility.

The 1962 Evzone contains the following paragraph: "This year's graduating class is the first to hold commencement exercises at the new American Academy located in the suburb of Halandri, approximately seven miles from the center of Athens. They were among 380 students who proudly took possession of the new building last September . Two-storied, containing twelve modern classrooms, two science laboratories, a library and a study hall, the building replaced an ancient villa in Kifissia on Tatoi Road which overflowed into four very unscholarly army huts. In the rear of our new school is a spacious playground area...By late spring of 1962, it appears that a new junior school will be erected on our present grounds, plus a gymnasium and an auditorium."

A photograph of the campus in this same yearbook shows the new school building surrounded by open fields dotted with a few farmhouses. Until the early 1980s, ACS Athens students would follow the rituals of the school day to the accompaniment of the sound of bells clanging from the necks of the flocks of sheep and goats pastured in the neighboring fields.

The 1960s saw a continued expansion of the Halandri facilities. The Middle School was built in its present location in 1962; this was followed by the erection of the gymnasium the following year.

In 1964, the first two stories of the current Annex building were erected to house an elementary school. The first two stories of the current Elementary School were built in 1968. Throughout these years, ACS Athens continued to operate separate Elementary School facilities in Kifissia and on base. In 1968, yet another branch of ACS Athens was established on the island of Rhodes, for the approximately thirty children of Voice of America personnel stationed there. This branch of the school operated until 1981.

In 1963, the Greek government licensed the school to provide education to the children of Americans in official capacities. During that year, the school also began to admit students from the wider American and international expatriate communities in Greece, and ACS Athens began to take on an international flavor within the framework of an American school. (In the early 1980s, this license was amended, and ACS Athens was recognized by the Greek Ministry of Education as an educational institution for the international community in Greece.) The Middle States Association of Schools and Colleges accredited the high school in 1964. At the time, ACS Athens was one of only two international schools so distinguished. When, in 1983, the Middle States Association had expanded its accrediting authority to cover elementary and middle schools, ACS Athens received accreditation for its K-12 program.

The decade of the 1970s found ACS Athens engaged in its most ambitious building program. In 1974, the school saw the building of the bridge, containing science labs, administrative offices and a conference room, connecting the academy and the middle school; the current cafeteria, which originally served as the library; the amphitheater; and finally, the current library and fine arts classrooms. Additions to annex and elementary school buildings during the decade resulted in their taking their current form. The school's academic program was also expanded during these years: in 1976, ACS Athens became the only school in Greece to offer students the opportunity to earn an International Baccalaureate diploma as they pursued their high school studies. In 1978, the Department of Defense assumed control of the operation of the base school; at the same time, the international mix of the student body was enhanced by the arrival of a large Arabic community in the Athens area.

From 1976 to 1979 students that were Military Dependents from the U.S. Air Base located near the old International Airport near Glyfada just south of Athens were bused into Halandri via off duty Tourist Buses. The route to the school took American Service Personnel's children through the heart of Athens and right by the Acropolis. American children of US Service Military personnel made up the majority of the student body population. The other large group attending ACS from 1976 to 1979 was a group of American Students whose parents worked for the American diplomatic corps. Other type of students was Greek-American students, Oil Field Worker's dependents, Australian-Greek students and Norwegian students.

In 1980, ACS Athens purchased the land currently occupied by the tennis courts. The Boarding Unit, originally housed in a hotel near the airport in Glyfada, and subsequently relocated to Kefalari and Nea Makri before moving to its current location in Mati, opened in 1981. As a result, the student body expanded to include, among others, many children of expatriate Americans working in the oil fields of the Arabian peninsula. In a major curricular innovation, ACS Athens established the ACS Athens Writing Project to promote the teaching of writing as a tool for learning across the disciplines in 1985.

Two years later, ACS Athens was selected as a sponsor of an International Writing Project site, with ACS Athens teachers engaged in training teachers from international schools around the world in Writing Project theory and methods. The Carnegie Commission for Promoting Excellence in Education recognized the quality of the school's academic program by awarding ACS Athens two citations for excellence during the latter part of the decade.

In 1986, ACS Athens closed the Kifissia Elementary School, and all school operations were consolidated at the Halandri campus, which had been expanded yet again with the building of new computer labs adjacent to the library. The purchase in 1988 of the public road which divided the campus allowed for the building of the central plaza which unified the campus. The closing of the American military bases during the 1992–1993 school year, coupled with the Greek government's decision to allow Greek citizens to attend ACS Athens after completion of their compulsory education, resulted in yet another transformation in the complexion of the student body. While preserving its American character in philosophy and programs, ACS Athens, home to students representing over forty-five countries, was also ready to define itself as "The International School in Greece."

Another milestone in ACS Athens' history occurred in 2004, when ACS Athens was authorized by the Greek Ministry of Education to offer classes and examinations leading to awarding the Greek Apolytirio.

The school is on one campus in the municipality of Halandri, at 129 Aghias Paraskevis Avenue. The student body is made up of over 1000 (2019-2020 data) students hailing from over 65 countries, and the school offers the American JK–12 curriculum, the International Baccalaureate IB Diploma, as well as a non-IB track, along with selected AP courses. Its faculty hold at least a master's degree and a number with PhDs.

== Notable alumni ==
- Greg Kinnear, Hollywood actor
- Scott E. Parazynski, physician, former astronaut
- Rony Seikaly, former NBA basketball player
- Jim Moody, Congressman
- Josephine (singer)
- AJ Ginnis, ski racer
- Theodora Gaïtas, Associate Justice, Minnesota Supreme Court
