= 2002 Minnesota Attorney General election =

- November 5, 2002
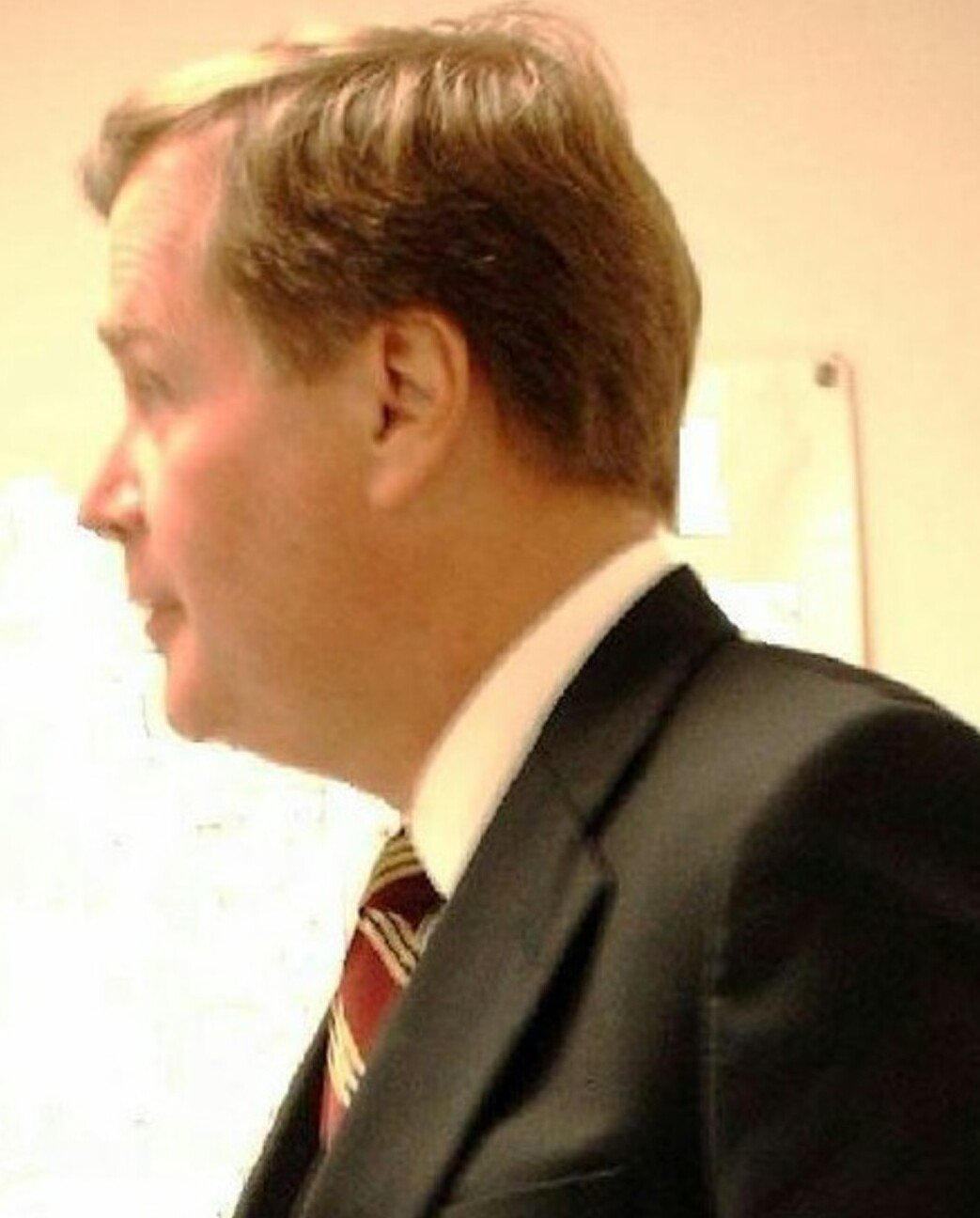

Nominee	Mike Hatch	Thomas Kelly
Party	Democratic (DFL)	Republican
Popular vote	1,197,362	894,654
Percentage	54.6%	40.8%
- Hatch: 40–50% 50–60% 60–70% 70–80% 80–90% >90% Kelly: 40–50% 50–60% 60–70% 70–80% 80–90% >90% Tie: 40–50% 50%
Attorney General before election
Mike Hatch
Democratic (DFL)
Elected Attorney General
Mike Hatch
Democratic (DFL)

The 2002 Minnesota Attorney General election was held on Tuesday, November 5, 2002, to elect the Minnesota Attorney General for a four-year term. Incumbent DFL Attorney General Mike Hatch ran for reelection and won. The election marked the ninth attorney general race in a row won by the DFL since 1970.

== Democratic–Farmer–Labor primary ==
Incumbent attorney general Mike Hatch won the DFL nomination unopposed at the party's May 3 convention in Minneapolis. There was some speculation that Hatch would not seek the endorsement for attorney general and instead launch his third run for governor, but it did not come to pass.

The primary was held on September 10. Incumbent attorney general Mike Hatch won the primary unopposed.

=== Candidates ===
==== Nominated in primary ====
- Mike Hatch, incumbent Minnesota Attorney General

==== Declined ====
- Matt Entenza, state representative from St. Paul

=== Results ===
2002 DFL Primary Election for Minnesota Attorney General
Party	Candidate	Votes	%
Democratic (DFL)	Mike Hatch	216,309	100.00%
Total votes		216,309	100%

== Republican primary ==
Lawyer Thomas Kelly of Medina was endorsed uncontested at the state Republican convention in St. Paul on June 15.

The primary was held on September 10. Kelly defeated perennial candidate and 1994 Republican nominee for attorney general Sharon Anderson.

=== Candidates ===
==== Nominated in primary ====
- Thomas Kelly, lawyer at Dorsey & Whitney

==== Eliminated in primary ====
- Sharon Anderson, activist, perennial candidate

=== Results ===
Results by county: Kelly: 50–60%; 60–70%; 70–80%; Tie: 50%

2002 Republican Primary Election for Minnesota Attorney General
Party	Candidate	Votes	%
Republican	Thomas Kelly	126,407	68.81%
Republican	Sharon Anderson	57,299	31.19%
Total votes		183,706	100%

== Independence primary ==
Lawyer Dale Nathan was the only candidate to seek the Independence Party endorsement for attorney general at the party's July 13 convention in St. Cloud. He did not receive the endorsement after word spread of a pending disciplinary action against him by the Minnesota Lawyers Professional Responsibility Board

The primary was held on September 10. Nathan defeated challenger Richard Bullock.

=== Reform Party ===
==== Nominated in primary ====
- Dale Nathan, lawyer

==== Eliminated in primary ====
- Richard Bullock

==== Results ====
Results by county: Nathan: 50–60%; 60–70%; Bullock: 50–60%; 60–70%; Tie: 50%

2002 Republican Primary Election for Minnesota Attorney General
Party	Candidate	Votes	%
Independence	Dale Nathan	14,410	54.04%
Independence	Richard Bullock	12,256	45.96%
Total votes		26,666	100%

== General election ==
=== Results ===
2002 Minnesota Attorney General election
Party	Candidate	Votes	%	±%
Democratic (DFL)	Mike Hatch	1,197,362	54.64%	+6.81%
Republican	Thomas Kelly	894,654	40.83%	−3.00%
Independence	Dale Nathan	96,817	4.42%	−1.38%
N/A	Write Ins	2,511	0.12%	+0.03%
Total votes		2,191,344	100.00%	
