= Edward C. Stringer =

American judge

Edward Charles Stringer (born February 13, 1935) is a retired Associate Justice of the Minnesota Supreme Court. A graduate of Amherst College and the University of Minnesota Law School, he authored a number of opinions as a Justice. He is now in private law practice in Minnesota.
