= Dick Borstad =

American football player and coach

Biographical details
- Born: c. 1935

Playing career
- 1955–1957: Minnesota
- Position: Fullback

Coaching career (HC unless noted)
- 1958: Hamline (assistant)
- 1959–1961: Minnesota (assistant)
- 1962–1966: Minnesota–Morris
- 1967–1969: North Dakota State (assistant)
- 1970–1971: Macalester

Head coaching record
- Overall: 18–36–2

Richard F. Borstad (born c. 1935) is an American former college football player and coach. He served as the head football coach at the University of Minnesota–Morris from 1962 to 1966 and at Macalester College in St. Paul, Minnesota from 1970 to 1971. Prior to that, he served as an assistant coach his alma mater, the University of Minnesota, during the national championship 1960 team.

== Head coaching record ==
Year	Team	Overall	Conference	Standing	Bowl/playoffs
Minnesota–Morris Cougars (NAIA independent) (1962–1966)
1962	Minnesota–Morris	1–2			
1963	Minnesota–Morris	5–3			
1964	Minnesota–Morris	5–4			
1965	Minnesota–Morris	2–7			
1966	Minnesota–Morris	1–8			
Minnesota–Morris:		14–24			
Macalester Scots (Minnesota Intercollegiate Athletic Conference) (1970–1971)
1970	Macalester	3–5–1	2–4–1	6th	
1971	Macalester	1–7–1	1–6	7th	
Macalester:		4–12–2	3–10–1		
Total:		18–36–2			
