= Charlie Weaver (politician) =

American politician (born 1957)

Chief of Staff To The Governor of Minnesota
- In office January 6, 2003 – November 14, 2003
- Governor: Tim Pawlenty

Commissioner of The Minnesota Department of Public Safety
- In office January 4, 1999 – December 31, 2002
- Governor: Jesse Ventura
- Preceded by: Don Davis
- Succeeded by: Rich Stanek

Minnesota State Representative from District 49A
- In office January 3, 1989 – January 4, 1999
- Preceded by: Darby Nelson
- Succeeded by: Jim Abeler

Personal details
- Born: September 14, 1957 (age 69) Minnesota
- Party: Republican
- Spouse: Sara
- Children: 4
- Education: University of Oregon; University of Minnesota Law School
- Profession: Attorney

Charles R. Weaver, Jr. (born September 14, 1957) is a Minnesota politician, a former chief of staff to Minnesota Governor Tim Pawlenty, a former commissioner of the Minnesota Department of Public Safety, and a former Minnesota State Representative.

The son and nephew of former state representatives, Weaver was first elected to the House in 1989. In 1998, he ran for attorney general, losing to Mike Hatch.

In 1999, Governor Jesse Ventura appointed Weaver Commissioner of Public Safety, a position he held through 2002. In 2003, Governor Pawlenty appointed him chief of staff, a position he held for 11 months before stepping down to head the Minnesota Business Partnership, a lobbying group.

Weaver was periodically mentioned as a possible candidate to succeed Pawlenty, who did not seek a third term in office, but did not run.

Weaver is the son of former Minnesota State Representative Charlie Weaver, Sr. (1931–1992) and nephew of former State Representative John L. Weaver. He received his bachelor's degree in political science from the University of Oregon and law degree from the University of Minnesota Law School.

Party political offices
Preceded by Sharon Anderson	Republican nominee for Attorney General of Minnesota; 1998	Succeeded by Thomas Kelly
