= Karl Procaccini =

American judge (born 1983)

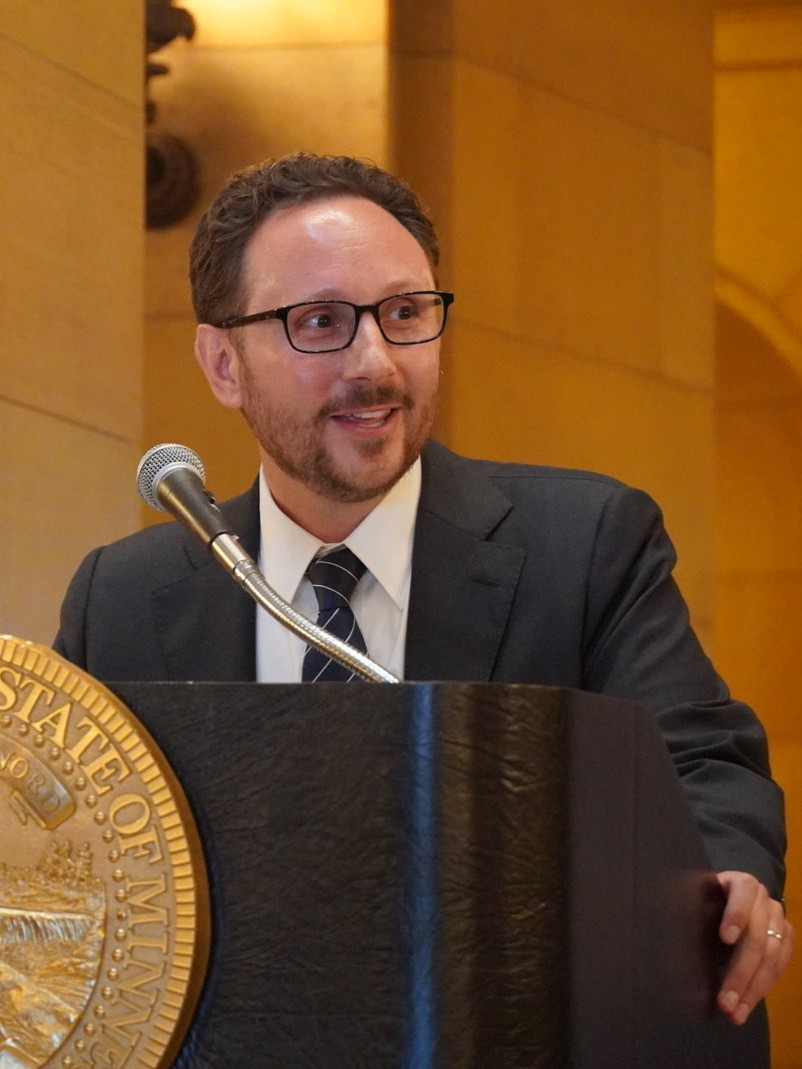
- Procaccini in 2024

Associate Justice of the Minnesota Supreme Court
- Incumbent
- Assumed office October 2, 2023
- Appointed by: Tim Walz
- Preceded by: Natalie Hudson

Personal details
- Born: February 1, 1983 (age 43) New London, Connecticut, U.S.
- Education: Harvard University (AB, JD) American University in Cairo (LLM)

Karl Procaccini (born February 1, 1983) is an American lawyer serving as an associate justice of the Minnesota Supreme Court. After a legal career that included private practice, public service, and teaching law, he was appointed to the Court by Governor Tim Walz in 2023 and elected to a full six-year term in 2024.

== Education ==
Procaccini grew up in Mystic, Connecticut, where he attended public schools and graduated from Robert E. Fitch Senior High School. He received a Bachelor of Arts, magna cum laude, from Harvard College, a Master of Laws in international and comparative law from The American University in Cairo, and a Juris Doctor, magna cum laude, from Harvard Law School in 2010, where he was an editor of the Harvard Human Rights Journal.

== Career ==
Procaccini began his legal career as a clerk for Judge Diana E. Murphy of the United States Court of Appeals for the Eighth Circuit and Chief Judge Michael J. Davis of the United States District Court for the District of Minnesota. He was later a partner at Greene Espel PLLP, where he represented clients in complex business and commercial disputes, in both litigation and arbitration. He also advised clients on sensitive internal investigations and global compliance matters. While in private practice, Procaccini devoted significant time to pro bono representation, providing free legal services, and was repeatedly recognized by the Minnesota State Bar Association for his pro bono work. Before his appointment to the bench, Procaccini was a law professor at the University of St. Thomas School of Law and at the former William Mitchell College of Law. He also served as general counsel in the governor's office. As a result of his public service, he was named a 2020 Minnesota Attorney of the Year. He also received the 2021 Public Attorney Award of Excellence from the Public Law Section of the Minnesota State Bar Association.

=== Professional and community involvement ===
Procaccini has led the International Business Law Section of the Minnesota State Bar Association. He also participates in the Reader/Writer program, where he volunteers as a writing coach to Minneapolis Public School students. Additionally, Procaccini served as a mentor in the University of St. Thomas School of Law Externship Program.

Procaccini was a longtime leader of the Minneapolis-St. Paul Chapter of the American Constitution Society, serving on the group's executive board and board of advisers for over a decade.

=== Appointment to Minnesota Supreme Court ===
On August 23, 2023, Governor Tim Walz announced Procaccini's appointment to serve as an associate justice of the Minnesota Supreme Court, filling the vacancy left by the elevation of Natalie Hudson to chief justice. Announcing Procaccini's appointment, Walz said: "Karl understands how legal decisions impact the lives of Minnesotans. There is no one more prepared for the rigors and challenges that come with this important position. I know that Karl will continue to improve the lives of Minnesotans in this important role."

Procaccini said he would recuse himself from cases in which he had acted as a lawyer for one of his former clients. The first Muslim on the court, Procaccini took office on October 2, 2023.

=== 2024 election ===
In 2024, Procaccini faced a contested statewide election to retain his seat. His campaign emphasized fairness, integrity, and equal justice under the law, and he advocated for a judiciary that is impartial, accessible, and grounded in the rule of law. Procaccini was endorsed by the Academy of Certified Trial Lawyers of Minnesota and received the support of nine former Minnesota Supreme Court justices. His campaign committee raised over $235,000. Receiving over 1.3 million votes in the November 2024 general election, he defeated his opponent by a margin of over 13% and was elected to a full six-year term.

=== Awards and publications ===
Procaccini achieved academic recognition while attending Harvard College, including being elected to Phi Beta Kappa, being selected as a John Kenneth Galbraith Scholar, and receiving the John Petersen Elder, James Gordon Bennett, and Thomas T. Hoopes prizes. He served as a Writing Center Fellow while attending the American University in Cairo.

Procaccini has been recognized by the American Constitution Society, the Minnesota State Bar Association, Minnesota Super Lawyers, and Minnesota Lawyer for excellence and leadership in the practice of law. Since 2019, he has been a Fellow of the American Bar Foundation, an honor limited to 1% of licensed attorneys.

Procaccini's published work includes an article in the Harvard Human Rights Journal about the European and Inter-American Courts of Human Rights, an article in the University of St. Thomas Law Journal about Minnesota's pardons process, and book chapters about attorney-client privilege. He has also presented at numerous continuing education conferences.

== Personal life ==
Procaccini is married to Nayla Hamdi, a psychologist in the Minneapolis VA Health Care System. He converted to Islam when he married.

Procaccini and Hamdi lived in Egypt from 2005 to 2007. While in Egypt, Procaccini worked as a band and history teacher and obtained a master's degree in international and comparative law from the American University in Cairo.

Legal offices
Preceded by Natalie Hudson	Associate Justice of the Minnesota Supreme Court; 2023–present	Incumbent
