= Minnesota Department of Commerce =

Minnesota governmental agency

Agency overview
- Formed: 1983
- Jurisdiction: Minnesota
- Headquarters: 85 7th Place East, Suite 280; Saint Paul, Minnesota
- Agency executive: Grace Arnold
- Parent agency: State of Minnesota
- Website: https://mn.gov/commerce/

The Minnesota Department of Commerce is the governmental agency in the U.S. State of Minnesota responsible for regulating a number of critical businesses that impact the public health and welfare. These include state-licensed or regulated industries such as insurance, real estate, property appraisals, debt collection agencies, financial institutions, commodity weights and measures, and telecommunications. The department has a history of being closely-involved in significant social and political issues concerning the public interest.

== History ==
The agency was formed in 1983 from the Commerce Commission, which was a group of three separate commissions on banks, insurance, and real estate. This previous body was created by the legislature in 1970.

== Functions ==
The Department of Commerce has numerous functions primarily related to public or consumer protections against regulated industries. These include ensuring the accuracy of weights and scales at gas pumps, advocating for the public interest of public energy and utility issues such as the Line 3 Gas replacement as well as addressing complaints on insurance agents and brokers, real estate agents and appraisers, financial institutions such as banks and others. Consumers can file complaints against providers and an investigation will be performed by the department to determine if any illegal actions occurred.
