= Wilhelmina Wright =

American judge (born 1964)

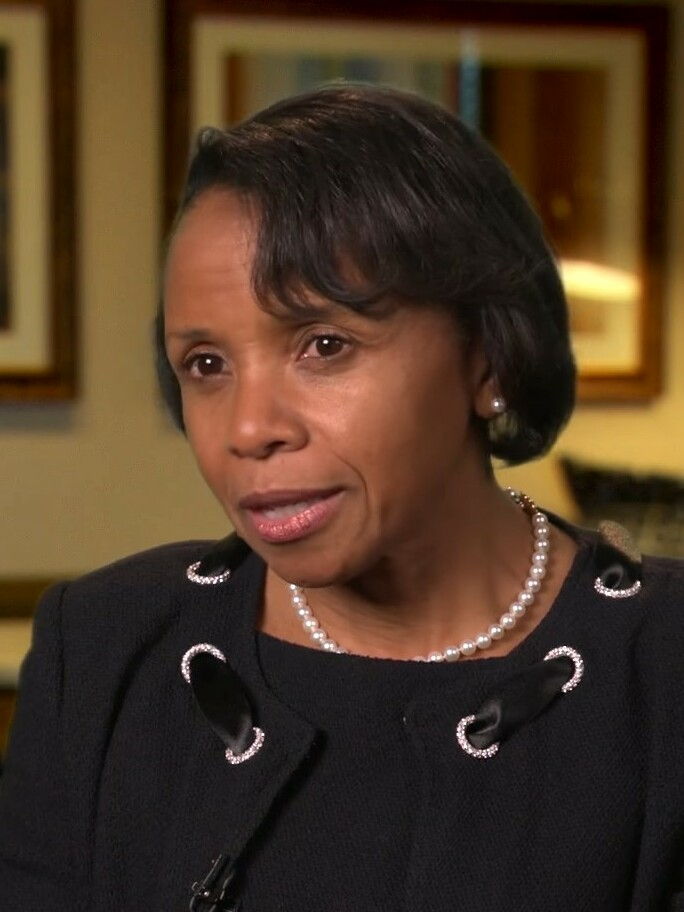
- Wright in 2018

Senior Judge of the United States District Court for the District of Minnesota
- Incumbent
- Assumed office February 15, 2024

Judge of the United States District Court for the District of Minnesota
- In office February 18, 2016 – February 15, 2024
- Appointed by: Barack Obama
- Preceded by: Michael J. Davis
- Succeeded by: Laura Provinzino

Associate Justice of the Minnesota Supreme Court
- In office September 27, 2012 – February 18, 2016
- Appointed by: Mark Dayton
- Preceded by: Helen Meyer
- Succeeded by: Margaret Chutich

Judge of the Minnesota Court of Appeals
- In office September 3, 2002 – September 26, 2012
- Appointed by: Jesse Ventura
- Preceded by: Sam Hanson
- Succeeded by: John Smith

Judge of the District Court of Minnesota for Ramsey County
- In office November 2000 – September 3, 2002
- Appointed by: Jesse Ventura

Personal details
- Born: 1964 (age 61–62) Norfolk, Virginia, U.S.
- Education: Yale University (BA); Harvard University (JD)

Wilhelmina Marie Wright (born 1964) is an American jurist and lawyer. She is an inactive senior United States district judge of the United States District Court for the District of Minnesota. Wright is the first jurist in Minnesota history to have served in all three levels of the state judiciary, as a state district court judge, appellate court judge, and state supreme court justice. She then served as an active federal district court judge from 2016 to 2024. Wright was elected to a six-year term on the Harvard Board of Overseers in 2022.

== Early life and education ==
Wright was born in 1964, in Norfolk, Virginia. Growing up, her mother had to advocate for her to receive equal education due to ongoing resistance to integration. She went on to study literature at Yale University, receiving a Bachelor of Arts degree and graduating cum laude in 1986. Wright received her Juris Doctor from Harvard Law School in 1989.

== Career ==
=== Early legal career ===
Wright served as a law clerk for Judge Damon Keith of the United States Court of Appeals for the Sixth Circuit from 1989 to 1991. In 1991, she began working at the law firm of Hogan & Hartson, LLP, in Washington, D.C., where she took up cases involving U.S. public schools' opportunity, before joining the United States Attorney's Office in Minnesota in 1995. In this position, Wright was an Assistant Attorney for the U.S. District Court and the U.S. Eighth Circuit Court of Appeals, where she took up cases involving illegal economic activity and violence. Between 2000 and 2002, Wright was involved with the Minnesota State Bar Association Task Force on the American Bar Association Model Rules of Professional Conduct, the Minnesota Judicial Council, and the Minnesota Courts Public Trust and Confidence Work Group, as a judge for the Ramsey County District Court.

=== Academic career ===
Wright has also taught others about the law. In Geneva, Switzerland, she worked for International Bridges to Justice training on the rule of law, and in Belgium and other areas in Switzerland she taught judicial selection. Closer to home, she was a professor at the University of St. Thomas School of Law and taught judicial accountability in other areas of the United States.

=== State judicial service ===
Governor Jesse Ventura appointed Wright to the Ramsey County District Court in 2000, and in 2002 he appointed her to the Minnesota Court of Appeals, on which she served from September 3, 2002, to September 26, 2012. As part of this position, Wright was the Special Redistricting Panel Presiding Judge between June 2011 and August 2012.

Governor Mark Dayton appointed Wright to the Minnesota Supreme Court on August 20, 2012. She was the first African American woman to serve on the Minnesota Supreme Court. In an August 2012 interview with Minnesota Lawyer Managing Editor Barbara Jones, Wright said she had the opportunity to help the court "reflect the diversity of Minnesota". Her tenure began on September 27, 2012, and ended in 2016; in 2014, Wright was reelected and served part of a term that was to end in 2020, but then moved to serve federally.

=== Federal judicial service ===
In February 2015, Senators Amy Klobuchar and Al Franken recommended Wright for the federal bench. On April 15, 2015, President Barack Obama nominated Wright to serve as a United States district judge of the United States District Court for the District of Minnesota, saying he was "confident she will serve on the federal bench with distinction". She was appointed to the seat vacated by Judge Michael J. Davis, Minnesota's first Black federal judge, who assumed senior status on August 1, 2015. Wright was ranked Unanimously Well Qualified for this federal position by the American Bar Association. After a hearing on July 22, 2015, her nomination was reported by the Senate Judiciary Committee on September 17 by voice vote. This made Wright the first African American woman appointed to the United States District Court for the District of Minnesota. On January 19, 2016, the Senate confirmed her nomination by a 58–36 vote, with 14 Republicans voting to confirm her. During the confirmation hearing, Klobuchar called the seat vacancy a "judicial emergency". Wright received her commission on February 18, 2016, and continues to serve as a U.S. district judge. In January 2022, after Justice Stephen Breyer announced his intention to retire, Wright was mentioned as a possible nominee to the Supreme Court by President Joe Biden. On November 30, 2023, it was announced that Wright would retire from the bench on February 15, 2024. On February 15, 2024, Wright assumed inactive senior status, even though she had not obtained the statutory service requirements: 65 years of age, ten years of Article III service, and a total of age and service years equal to 80.

== Awards ==
Wright has earned numerous awards during her career, including the Myra Bradwell Award in 2006 from the Minnesota Women Lawyers, the Lena O. Smith Achievement Award from the Black Women Lawyers Network in 2004, the B. Warren Hart Award for Public Service from the Saint Paul Jaycees in 2001, and the Ten Outstanding Young Minnesotans Award in 2000. In 1997, Justice Wright also earned the United States Department of Justice Special Achievement Award and in 2000, she earned the United States Department of Justice Director's Award for Public Service. In 2008, she joined the American Law Institute, and in 2019 she was given a Diversity and Inclusion Award from Minnesota Lawyer.

== Personal life ==
Wright is married to Ecolab executive Dan Schmechel. They have one daughter. Wright serves in the American Bar Association, the Minnesota State Bar Association, the Ramsey County Bar Association, the Minnesota Association of Black Lawyers, and the National Association of Women Judges. She is also a member of the William Mitchell College of Law Board of Trustees, the Hubert H. Humphrey Institute of Public Affairs Advisory Council, the Minnesota Lawyer Advisory Board, and the Yale University Council.

== See also ==
- Joe Biden Supreme Court candidates
- List of African-American federal judges
- List of African-American jurists

Legal offices
Preceded by Helen Meyer	Associate Justice of the Minnesota Supreme Court; 2012–2016	Succeeded by Margaret Chutich
Preceded by Michael J. Davis	Judge of the United States District Court for the District of Minnesota; 2016–2024	Succeeded by Laura Provinzino
