= Ember Reichgott Junge =

American politician

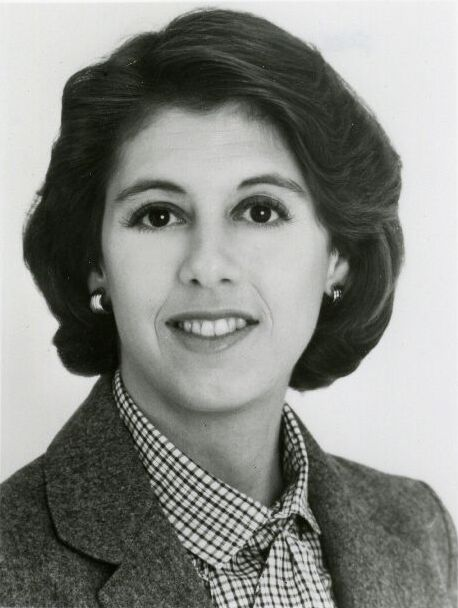

Member of the Minnesota Senate from the 46th district
- In office 1983–2001
- Preceded by: Donald J. Frank
- Succeeded by: Ann Rest

Personal details
- Born: August 22, 1953 (age 73)
- Party: Minnesota Democratic-Farmer-Labor Party
- Spouse: Michael
- Education: St. Olaf College (BA); Duke University (JD); University of St. Thomas (MBA)
- Occupation: Attorney, legislator

Ember Reichgott Junge (born August 22, 1953) is an attorney, radio personality, and former state senator from Minnesota, representing New Hope and surrounding communities. A Democrat, she was elected to the Senate at age 29 and served for 18 years. Junge served as majority whip from 1991 to 1994, and as assistant majority leader from 1995 to 2000. She authored the first charter school law in the United States.

== Career ==
In 1998, Junge ran for Minnesota Attorney General in the DFL primary, losing to Mike Hatch, who went on to be elected in November. She served as the Minnesota chair of Joe Lieberman's 2004 presidential campaign. In 2006, she ran for Congress in the 5th Congressional district. In the contest to replace retiring incumbent Martin Olav Sabo, she placed third in the DFL primary, trailing Keith Ellison, the endorsed candidate, and former Sabo aide Mike Erlandson.

Junge is a frequent analyst on local Twin Cities political/public affairs programs, including KSTP-TV's At Issue with Tom Hauser and Almanac on Twin Cities Public Television.

Junge also pursues activities outside politics; she has appeared on stage at the Lakeshore Players Community Theater in White Bear Lake, Minnesota.

Junge is the Chief Advancement Officer for Lutheran Social Service of Minnesota.

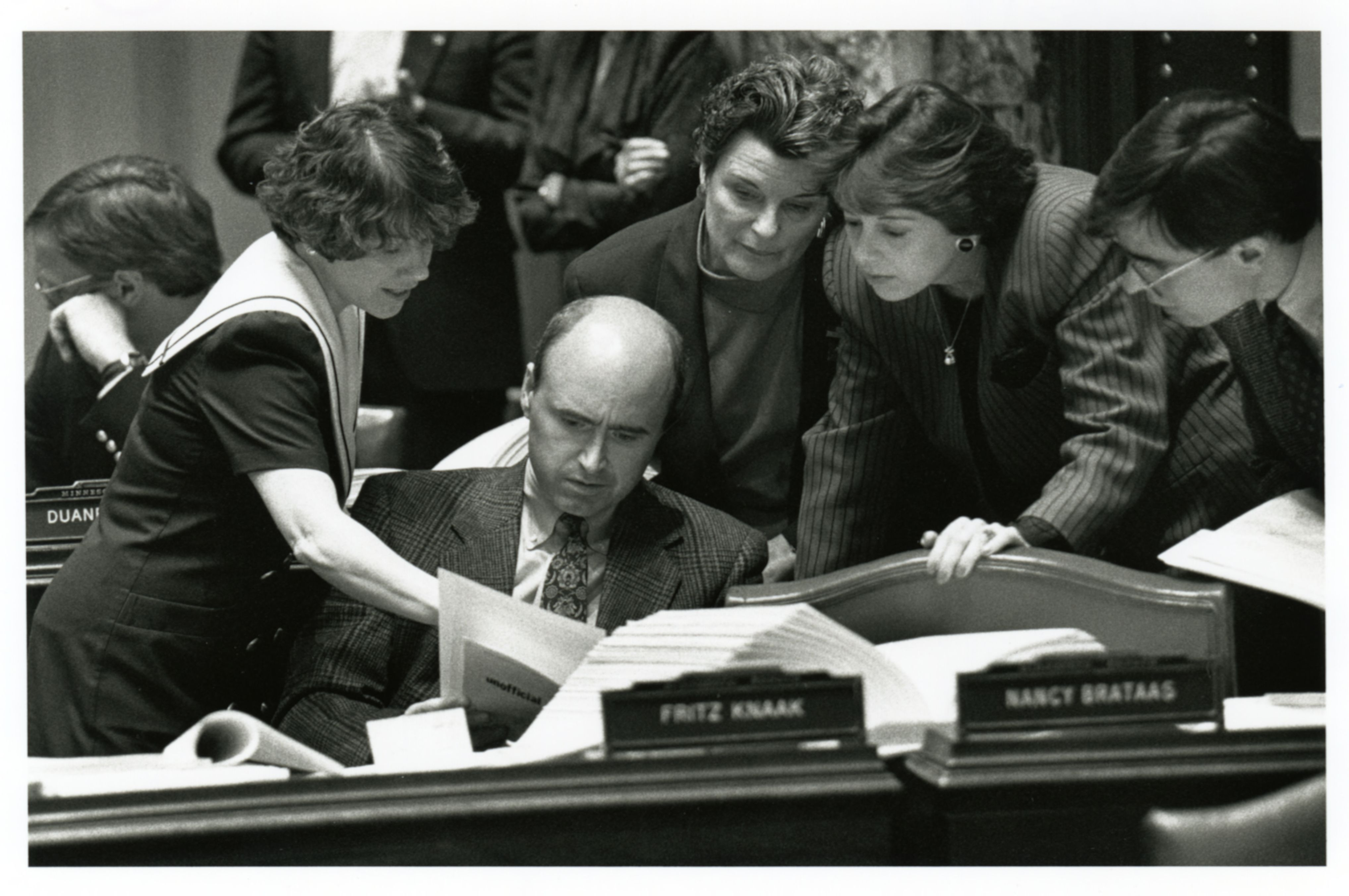
Senator Ember Reichgott Junge, Senator Jane Ranum, Senator Fritz Knaak, and Senator Pat Pariseau examine a bill during a Senate floor session, St. Paul, Minnesota.

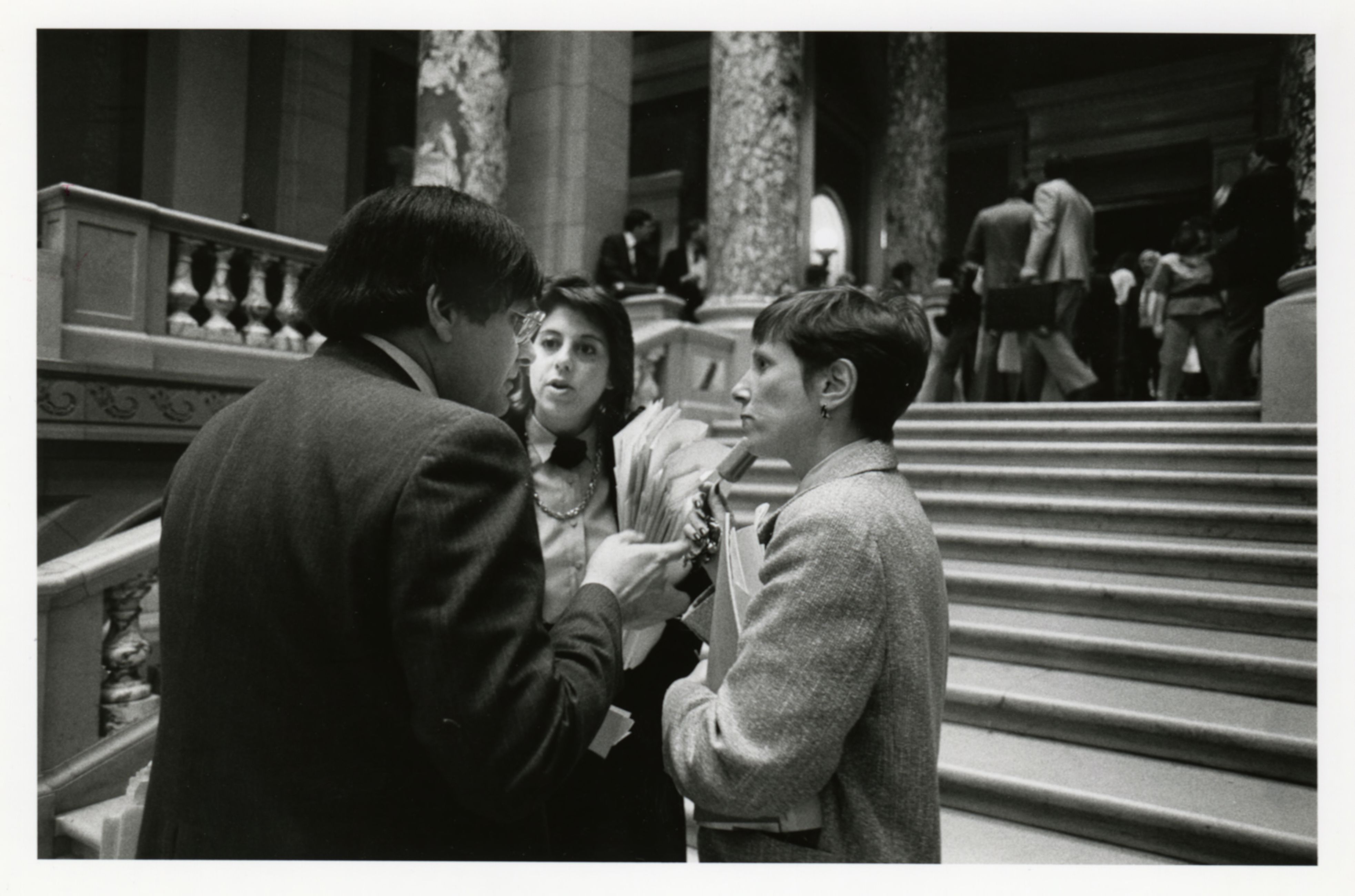
Senator Dick Cohen, Senator Ember Reichgott Junge and Senator Donna Peterson converse outside the Senate Chamber, St. Paul, Minnesota.
