= Minnesota Supreme Court =

Highest court in Minnesota, United States

Coordinates: 44°57′16″N 93°6′1″W

- Interactive map of Minnesota Supreme Court
- Established: May 24, 1858
- Location: Saint Paul, Minnesota
- Composition method: Nonpartisan election, appointment by the governor if filling midterm vacancy
- Authorised by: Minnesota Constitution
- Appeals to: Supreme Court of the United States
- Judge term length: 6 years (mandatory retirement at the age of 70)
- Number of positions: 7
- Website: Official website

Chief Justice
- Currently: Theodora Gaïtas
- Since: October 1, 2026
- Jurist term ends: January 1, 2029

The Minnesota Supreme Court is the highest court in the U.S. state of Minnesota. The court hears cases in the Supreme Court chamber of the Minnesota State Capitol and in the nearby Minnesota Judicial Center.

The Minnesota Supreme Court consists of a chief justice and six justices. All seven are initially appointed by the governor of Minnesota, and then may run for election to six-year terms. All members must retire upon turning 70.

== History ==
The court was first assembled as a three-judge panel in 1849 when Minnesota was still a territory. The first members were lawyers from outside the region, appointed by President Zachary Taylor. The court system was rearranged when Minnesota became a state in 1858.

Appeals from the Minnesota District Court originally went directly to the Minnesota Supreme Court, which heard 1,800 cases per year. In 1983, the legislature created the Minnesota Court of Appeals, an intermediate appellate court, to handle most of those cases. The Supreme Court now considers about 900 appeals per year and accepts review in about one in eight cases. Certain appeals proceed directly to the Supreme Court, such as those involving taxes, first-degree murder, and workers' compensation.

== Composition ==
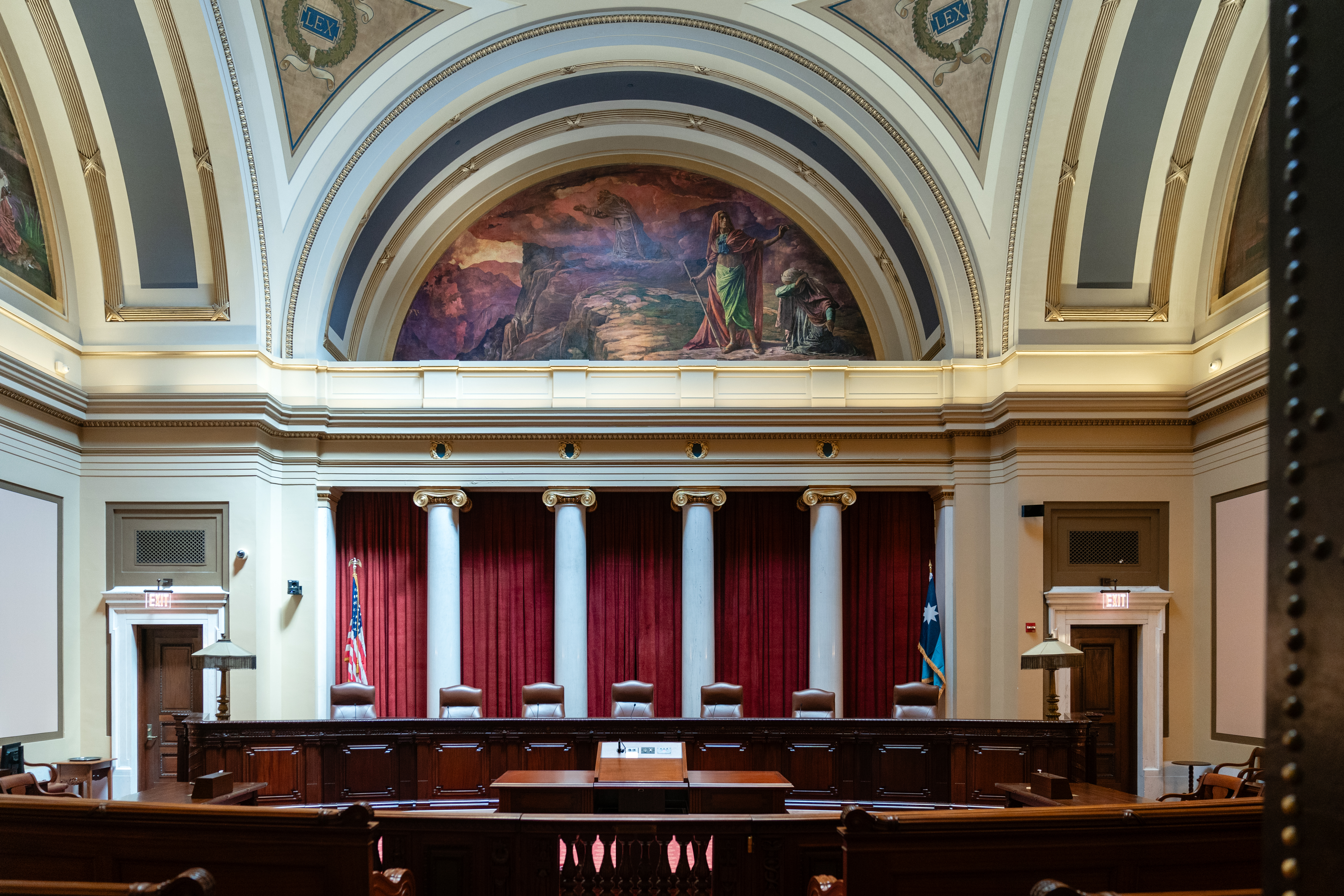
Interior

The justices are elected to renewable six-year terms. When a midterm vacancy occurs, the governor of Minnesota appoints a replacement to a term that ends after the general election occurring more than one year after the appointment. Most vacancies occur during a term. The most recent election to an open seat on the court was in 1992, when former Minnesota Vikings player Alan Page was elected. Judges in Minnesota must retire at age 70.

In 1977, Rosalie E. Wahl became the first woman to serve on the Court. In 1993, Alan Page became the first African American to serve on the Court. In 2016, Anne McKeig, a descendant of the White Earth Band of Ojibwe, became the first Native American justice, while 2023 saw Karl Procaccini become the first Muslim to serve on the court.

== Salary ==
As of 2025, the chief justice is paid a $236,429 salary and associate justices receive $214,935.

== Members ==
Seat	Name	Born	Start	Term ends	Mandatory retirement (Note: Justices must retire at the end of the month in which they reach the age of 70.)	Appointer	Law school
Chief Justice	Theodora Gaïtas	1970 or 1971 (age 55–56)	August 1, 2024 (Note: Took office as Chief Justice on October 1, 2026 after being elevated by Governor Walz.)	January 1, 2029	2040 or 2041	Tim Walz (DFL)	Minnesota
5	Anne McKeig	February 9, 1967 (age 59)	August 31, 2016	January 6, 2031	February 28, 2037	Mark Dayton (DFL)	Hamline
4	Paul Thissen	December 10, 1966 (age 59)	May 14, 2018	January 4, 2033	December 31, 2036	Mark Dayton (DFL)	Chicago
3	Gordon Moore	April 6, 1963 (age 63)	August 3, 2020	January 1, 2029	April 30, 2033	Tim Walz (DFL)	Iowa
6	Karl Procaccini	February 1, 1983 (age 43)	October 2, 2023	January 6, 2031	February 28, 2053	Tim Walz (DFL)	Harvard
1	Sarah Hennesy	1969 or 1970 (age 56–57)	May 13, 2024	January 4, 2033	2039 or 2040	Tim Walz (DFL)	Drake
2	Reynaldo Aligada	July 8, 1976 (age 50)	October 1, 2026	January 1, 2029	July 31, 2046	Tim Walz (DFL)	William Mitchell

== Notable cases ==
- Baker v. Nelson, 291 Minn. 310, 191 N.W.2d 185 (1971), in which the Court held that denial of the statutory entitlement demanded by gay citizens to marry the adult of one's choice does not offend the United States Constitution; overturned by Obergefell v. Hodges, 576 U.S. 644 (2015).
- Doe v. Gomez, 27 Minn. 542 N.W.2d 17 (1995), in which the Court held that the right of privacy under the Minnesota Constitution includes the right to an abortion and that the Minnesota government may not deny funding for abortion while funding other pregnancy-related medical services.

== See also ==
- Courts of Minnesota
