= Minnesota =

U.S. state

- State
- Flag Seal
- Nicknames: North Star State; Gopher State; Land of 10,000 Lakes; Land of Sky Blue Waters
- Motto: L'Étoile du Nord (French: The Star of the North)
- Anthem: "Hail! Minnesota"
- Location of Minnesota within the United States
- Country: United States
- Before statehood: Minnesota Territory
- Admitted to the Union: May 11, 1858 (32nd)
- Capital: Saint Paul
- Largest city: Minneapolis
- Largest county or equivalent: Hennepin
- Largest metro and urban areas: Minneapolis–Saint Paul

Government
  - Governor: Tim Walz (DFL)
  - Lieutenant Governor: Peggy Flanagan (DFL)
- Legislature: Legislature
  - Upper house: Senate
  - Lower house: House of Representatives
- Judiciary: Minnesota Supreme Court
- U.S. senators: Amy Klobuchar (DFL); Tina Smith (DFL)
- U.S. House delegation: 4 Democrats; 4 Republicans (list)

Area
  - Total: 86,936 sq mi (225,163 km^{2})
  - Land: 79,627 sq mi (206,232 km^{2})
  - Water: 7,310 sq mi (18,930 km^{2}) 8.40%
  - Rank: 12th

Dimensions
  - Length: 400 mi (640 km)
  - Width: 200–350 mi (320–560 km)
- Elevation: 1,210 ft (370 m)
- Highest elevation (Eagle Mountain (Note: Elevation adjusted to North American Vertical Datum of 1988)): 2,300 ft (701 m)
- Lowest elevation (Lake Superior): 600 ft (183 m)

Population (2025)
  - Total: ▲5,830,405
  - Rank: 22nd
  - Density: 71/sq mi (27.6/km^{2})
  - Rank: 36th (2020 census)
  - Median household income: $85,100 (2023)
  - Income rank: 13th
- Demonym: Minnesotan

Language
  - Official language: none
  - Spoken language: English 88.9%; Spanish; Somali; Hmong
- Time zone: UTC– 06:00 (Central)
  - Summer (DST): UTC– 05:00 (CDT)
- USPS abbreviation: MN
- ISO 3166 code: US-MN
- Traditional abbreviation: Minn.
- Latitude: 43° 30′ N to 49° 23′ N
- Longitude: 89° 29′ W to 97° 14′ W
- Website: mn.gov

Minnesota (Note: /ˌmɪnəˈsoʊtə/ MIN-ə-SOH-tə) is a state in the Upper Midwestern region of the United States. It is bordered by the Canadian provinces of Manitoba and Ontario to the north and east and by the U.S. states of Wisconsin to the east, Iowa to the south, and North Dakota and South Dakota to the west. The northeast corner has a water boundary with Michigan across Lake Superior. It is the 12th-largest U.S. state in area and the 22nd-most populous, with about 5.8 million residents. Minnesota is known as the "Land of 10,000 Lakes"; it has 14,420 bodies of fresh water covering at least ten acres each. Roughly a third of the state is forested. Much of the remainder is prairie and farmland. More than 60% of Minnesotans (about 3.71 million) live in the Minneapolis–Saint Paul metropolitan area, known as the "Twin Cities", which is Minnesota's main political, economic, and cultural hub and the 16th-largest metropolitan area in the U.S. Other minor metropolitan and micropolitan statistical areas include Duluth, Mankato, Moorhead, Rochester, and St. Cloud.

Minnesota, which derives its name from the Dakota language, has been inhabited by various Native Americans since the Woodland period of the 11th century BCE. Between roughly 200 and 500 CE, two areas of the indigenous Hopewell tradition emerged: the Laurel complex in the north, and Trempealeau Hopewell in the Mississippi River Valley in the south. The Upper Mississippian culture, consisting of the Oneota people and other Siouan speakers, emerged around 1000 CE and lasted through the arrival of Europeans in the 17th century. French explorers and missionaries were the earliest Europeans to enter the region, encountering the Dakota, Ojibwe, and various Anishinaabe tribes. Much of what is now Minnesota formed part of the vast French holding of Louisiana, which the United States purchased in 1803. After several territorial reorganizations, the Minnesota Territory was admitted to the Union as the 32nd state in 1858. Minnesota's official motto, L'Étoile du Nord ("The Star of the North"), is the only state motto in French. This phrase was adopted shortly after statehood and reflects both the state's early French explorers and its position as the northernmost state in the contiguous U.S.

As part of the American frontier, Minnesota attracted settlers and homesteaders from across the country. Its growth was initially based on timber, agriculture, and railroad construction. Into the early 20th century, European immigrants arrived in significant numbers, particularly from Scandinavia, Germany, and Central Europe. Many were linked to the failed revolutions of 1848, which partly influenced the state's development as a center of labor and social activism. Minnesota's rapid industrialization and urbanization precipitated major social, economic, and political changes in the late 19th and early 20th centuries; the state was at the forefront of labor rights, women's suffrage, and political reform. Consequently, Minnesota is relatively unique among Midwestern states in being a reliable base for the Democratic Party, having voted for every Democratic presidential nominee since 1976, longer than any other U.S. state.

Since the late 20th century, Minnesota's economy has diversified away from traditional industries such as agriculture and resource extraction to services, finance, and health care. Minnesota ranks highly among national averages in terms of life expectancy, healthcare standards, and education, and above average in income per capita. Minnesota is home to 11 federally recognized Native American reservations (seven Ojibwe, four Dakota), and its culture, demographics, and religious landscape reflect Scandinavian and German influence. This heritage continues to affect the state's racial demographics, making it one of the country's least diverse states, but in recent decades, Minnesota has become more multicultural, due to both larger domestic migration and immigration from Latin America, Asia, the Horn of Africa, and the Middle East. The state has the nation's largest population of Somali Americans and the second-largest Hmong community.

== Etymology ==
The word Minnesota comes from the Dakota name for the Minnesota River, which got its name from one of two words in Dakota: mní sóta, which means "clear blue water", or Mníssota, which means "cloudy water". Early explorers interpreted the Dakota name for the Minnesota River in various ways, and four spellings of the state's name were considered before "Minnesota" was established in 1849, when the Territory of Minnesota was formed. Dakota people demonstrated the name to early settlers by dropping milk into water and calling it mní sóta.

Many places in the state have similar Dakota names, such as Minnehaha Falls ("curling water" or waterfall), Minneiska ("white water"), Minneota ("much water"), Minnetonka ("big water"), Minnetrista ("crooked water"), and Minneapolis, a hybrid word combining Dakota mní ("water") and -polis (Greek for "city"). The state seal features the phrase Mni Sóta Makoce ("the land where the water reflects the skies"), the Dakota name for the larger region.

== History ==
A map of Minnesota Territory 1849–1858

When Europeans arrived in North America, the Dakota people lived in what is now Minnesota. The first Europeans to enter the region were French voyageurs and fur traders who arrived in the 17th century. They used the Grand Portage to access trapping and trading areas further into Minnesota. The Anishinaabe (also known as Ojibwe or Chippewa) were migrating into Minnesota, and formed an Alliance with the Dakota. European powers destabilized the region economically and politically, resulting in the alliance's collapse and the Dakota-Ojibwe War, and dislocated the Mdewakanton from its homelands along Mille Lacs Lake. Explorers such as Daniel Greysolon, Sieur du Lhut, Father Louis Hennepin, Jonathan Carver, Henry Schoolcraft, and Joseph Nicollet mapped the state.

The region was part of Spanish Louisiana from 1762 to 1802. The portion of the state east of the Mississippi River became part of the United States at the end of the American Revolutionary War, when the Second Treaty of Paris was signed. Land west of the Mississippi was acquired with the Louisiana Purchase, though the Hudson's Bay Company disputed the Red River Valley until the Treaty of 1818, when the border on the 49th parallel was agreed upon.

In 1805, Zebulon Pike bargained with Native Americans to acquire land at the confluence of the Minnesota and Mississippi rivers to create a military reservation. The construction of Fort Snelling followed between 1819 and 1825. Its soldiers built a grist mill and a sawmill at Saint Anthony Falls, which were harbingers of the water-powered industries around which Minneapolis later grew. Meanwhile, squatters, government officials, and others had settled near the fort; in 1839 the army forced them off military lands, and most moved downriver, just outside the military reservation, to the area that became St. Paul.

Minnesota was part of several territorial organizations between acquisition and statehood. From 1812 to 1821 it was part of the Territory of Missouri that corresponded with much of the Louisiana Purchase. It was briefly an unorganized territory (1821–1834) and was later consolidated with Wisconsin, Iowa and half the Dakotas to form the short-lived Territory of Michigan (1834–1836). From 1836 to 1848, Minnesota and Iowa were part of the Territory of Wisconsin. From 1838 to 1846, Minnesota west of the Mississippi River was part of the Territory of Iowa. Minnesota east of the Mississippi was part of Wisconsin until 1848.

=== Statehood ===
When Iowa gained statehood, western Minnesota was in an Unorganized Territory again. Minnesota Territory was formed on March 3, 1849. The first territorial legislature, held on September 2, 1849, was dominated by men of New England ancestry. Minnesota became the 32nd U.S. state on May 11, 1858. The founding population was so overwhelmingly of New England origins that the state was dubbed "the New England of the West".

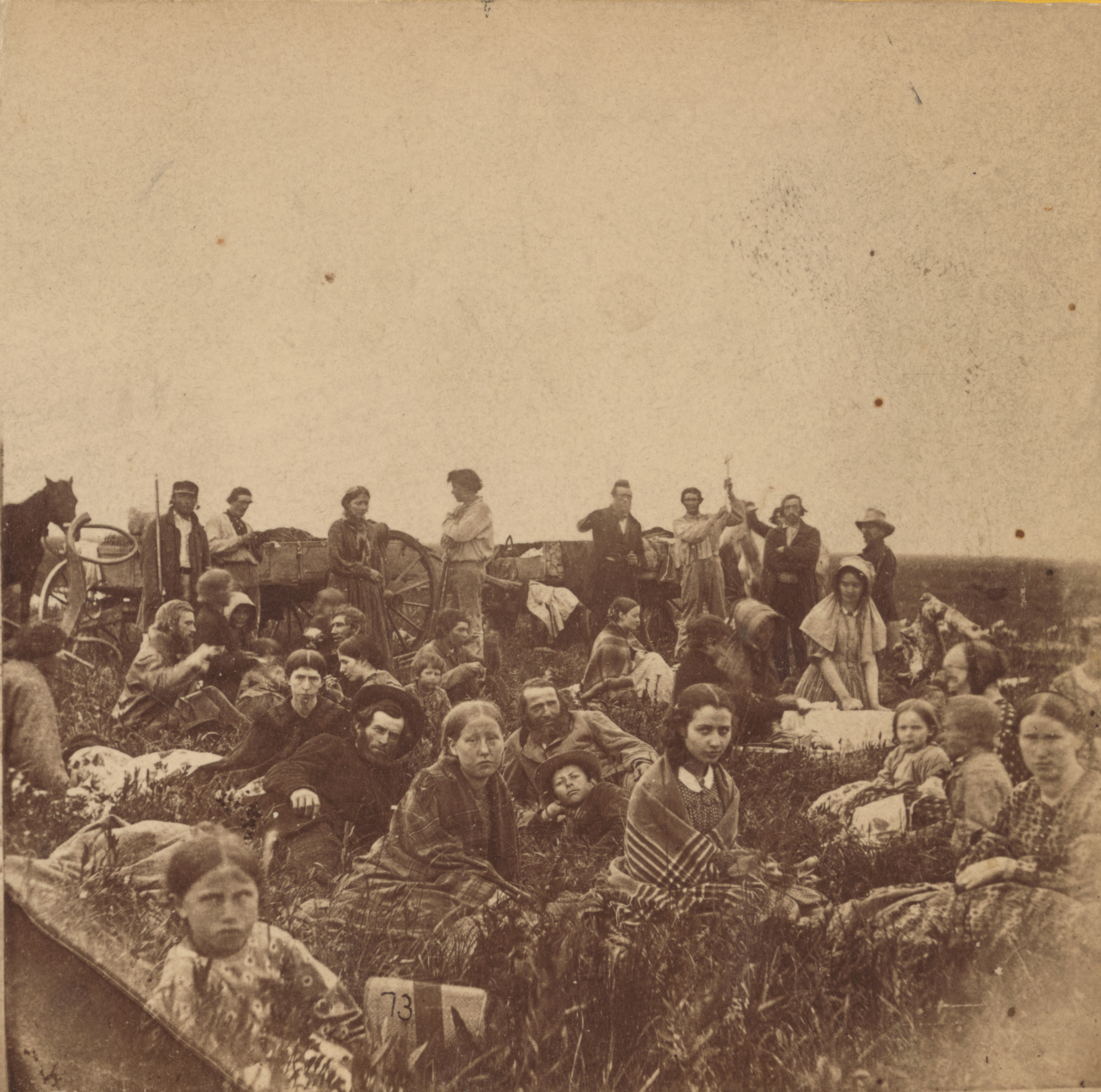
Mixed Dakota-Europeans who were rescued by "non-hostile" Dakota. The girl in the foreground wrapped in the striped blanket is Elise Robertson, the sister of Thomas Robertson, a mixed blood who acted as an intermediary between the Dakota and the European-Americans during the Dakota War of 1862

Treaties between the U.S. government and the eastern Dakota and Ojibwe gradually forced the natives off their lands and onto reservations. As conditions deteriorated for the eastern Dakota, tensions rose, leading to the Dakota War of 1862. The conflict was ignited when four young Dakota men, searching for food, killed a family of white settlers on August 17. That night, a faction of Little Crow's eastern Dakota decided to try to drive all settlers out of the Minnesota River valley. In the weeks that followed, Dakota warriors killed hundreds of settlers, causing thousands to flee the area. The six-week war ended with the defeat of the eastern Dakota and 2,000 in custody, who were eventually exiled to the Crow Creek Reservation by the Great Sioux Reservation in Dakota Territory. The remaining 4,500 to 5,000 Dakota mostly fled the state into Rupert's Land. As many as 800 settlers were killed during the war.

Minnesota Governor Alexander Ramsey subsequently declared that "the Sioux Indians of Minnesota must be exterminated or driven forever beyond the borders of the state" and placed a bounty of $25/scalp on the heads of the eastern Dakota men. Over 1,600 eastern Dakota women, children, and elderly walked from the Lower Sioux Agency to Fort Snelling to be held until the spring thaw allowed riverboats to take them out of Minnesota to Crow Creek Indian Reservation. William Crooks, commander of 6th Minnesota, had a palisade erected around the encampment on the river bottom flats directly below Fort Snelling, to protect native people from the soldiers and settlers. Conditions there were poor and between 125 and 300 died of disease. Around 400 Dakota men were tried after the war. 303 were sentenced to death, but Abraham Lincoln reviewed the convictions and approved 39 of the death sentences. In December 1862, 38 of them were hanged.

In early 1863, Ramsey resigned as governor to become the Federal Indian Commissioner. His successor, Governor Henry Swift, raised the bounty to $200/scalp. A total of $325 was paid out to four people collecting bounties, including for Little Crow who was killed in July 1863. Upon becoming Indian Commissioner, Ramsey set out to get Ojibwe lands too. In 1863 he negotiated the Treaty of Old Crossing, whereby the Ojibwe ceded all their land in northern Minnesota and moved to reservations.

Logging, farming, and railroads were mainstays of Minnesota's early economy. The sawmills at Saint Anthony Falls and logging centers of Pine City, Marine on St. Croix, Stillwater, and Winona processed vast quantities of timber. These cities were on rivers that were ideal for transportation. St. Anthony Falls was later tapped to provide power for flour mills. Innovations by Minneapolis millers led to the production of Minnesota "patent" flour, which commanded almost double the price of "bakers'" or "clear" flour which it replaced. By 1900, Minnesota mills, led by Pillsbury, Northwestern, and the Washburn-Crosby Company, an ancestor of General Mills, were grinding 14.1% of the nation's grain.

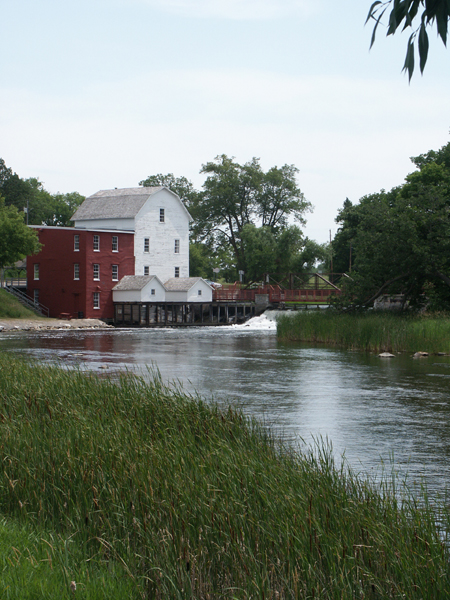
Phelps Mill in Otter Tail County

The state's iron-mining industry was established with the discovery of iron in the Vermilion and Mesabi ranges in the 1880s, followed by the Cuyuna Range in the early 1900s. The ore went by rail to Duluth and Two Harbors for ship transport east via the Great Lakes.

=== 20th and 21st centuries ===
Industrial development and the rise of manufacturing caused the population to shift gradually from rural areas to cities during the early 20th century. Nevertheless, farming remained prevalent. Minnesota's economy was hit hard by the Great Depression, resulting in lower prices for farmers, layoffs among iron miners, and labor unrest. Compounding the adversity, western Minnesota and the Dakotas were hit by drought from 1931 to 1935. New Deal programs provided some economic turnaround. The Civilian Conservation Corps and other programs around the state established some jobs for Indians on their reservations, and the Indian Reorganization Act of 1934 provided the tribes with a mechanism of self-government. This gave Natives a greater voice within the state and promoted more respect for tribal customs because religious ceremonies and native languages were no longer suppressed.

After World War II, industrial development quickened. New technology increased farm productivity through automation of feedlots for hogs and cattle, machine milking at dairy farms, and raising chickens in large buildings. Planting became more specialized, with hybridization of corn and wheat, and farm machinery such as tractors and combines became the norm. University of Minnesota professor Norman Borlaug contributed to these developments as part of the Green Revolution. Increased mobility enabled more specialized jobs.

Minnesota became a center of technology after World War II. Engineering Research Associates was formed in 1946 to develop computers for the United States Navy. It later merged with Remington Rand, and then became Sperry Rand. William Norris left Sperry in 1957 to form Control Data Corporation (CDC). Cray Research was formed when Seymour Cray left CDC to form his own company. Medical device maker Medtronic also started business in the Twin Cities in 1949. The nonprofit Mayo Clinic, which was founded in 1864 in Rochester, grew to become one of the country's leading medical systems, and, by the 21st century, Minnesota's largest private employer.

In 1957, the legislature created a planning commission for the Twin Cities metropolitan area, which became the Metropolitan Council in 1967. In 1971, under Governor Wendell Anderson, a series of legislation called the "Minnesota Miracle" led to a broad reform in financing of Minnesota public schools and local governments that created a fairer distribution in taxation and education. Two postwar Minnesota governors, former dentist Rudy Perpich and former professional wrestler Jesse Ventura, were both known for their unconventional manner, but enjoyed some popularity within the state.

In the 2020s, the state drew national and international attention for the murder of George Floyd and the subsequent George Floyd protests; a series of cases of fraud, most notably the Feeding Our Future scandal; and Operation Metro Surge. After a period of mostly divided government during the 21st century, the Minnesota Democratic–Farmer–Labor Party (DFL) won control of all three branches of Minnesota's government in 2022 and passed significant reforms in the 2023 legislative session, moving the state in a progressive direction.

== Geography ==
Scalable map of Minnesota, showing roads and major bodies of water

Minnesota is the second northernmost U.S. state (after Alaska) and northernmost contiguous state, as the isolated Northwest Angle in Lake of the Woods County is the only part of the 48 contiguous states north of the 49th parallel. The state is part of the U.S. region known as the Upper Midwest and part of North America's Great Lakes region. It shares a Lake Superior water border with Michigan and a land and water border with Wisconsin to the east. Iowa is to the south, North Dakota and South Dakota are to the west, and the Canadian provinces of Ontario and Manitoba are to the north. With 86,943 square miles (225,180 km^{2}), or approximately 2.25% of the United States, Minnesota is the 12th-largest state.

=== Geology ===
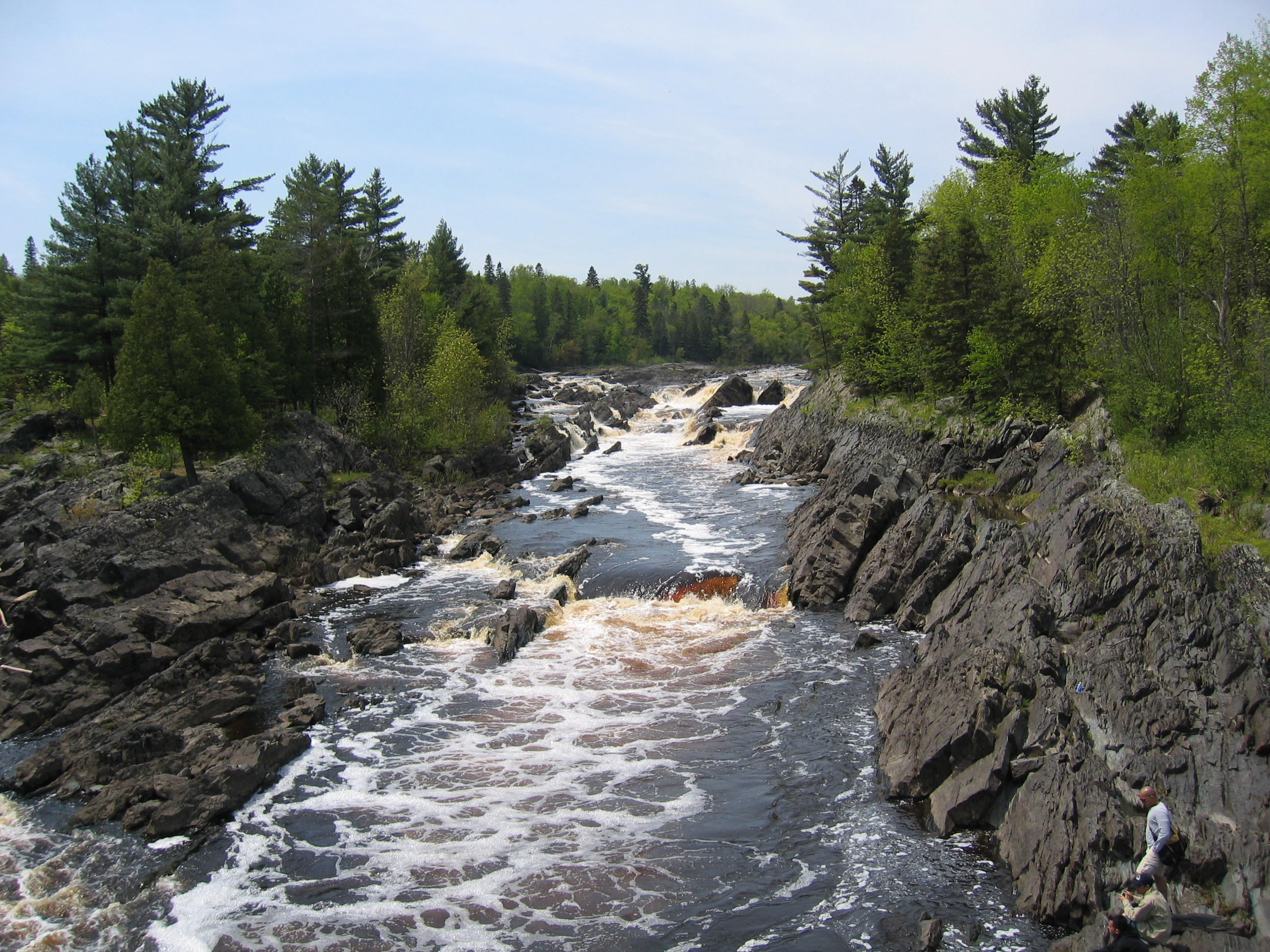
Tilted beds of the Middle Precambrian Thomson Formation in Jay Cooke State Park

Minnesota has some of the earth's oldest rocks, gneisses that are about 3.6 billion years old (80% as old as the planet). About 2.7 billion years ago basaltic lava poured out of cracks in the floor of the primordial ocean; the remains of this volcanic rock formed the Canadian Shield in northeast Minnesota. The roots of these volcanic mountains and the action of Precambrian seas formed the Iron Range of northern Minnesota. Since a period of volcanism 1.1 billion years ago, Minnesota's geological activity has been more subdued, with no volcanism or mountain formation, but with repeated incursions of the sea, which left behind multiple strata of sedimentary rock.

In more recent times, massive ice sheets at least one kilometer thick ravaged the state's landscape and sculpted its terrain. The Wisconsin glaciation left 12,000 years ago. These glaciers covered all of Minnesota except the far southeast, an area characterized by steep hills and streams that cut into the bedrock. This area is known as the Driftless Zone for its absence of glacial drift. Much of the remainder of the state has 50 feet (15 m) or more of glacial till left behind as the last glaciers retreated. Gigantic Lake Agassiz formed in the northwest 13,000 years ago. Its flatbed now is the fertile Red River valley, and its outflow, glacial River Warren, carved the valley of the Minnesota River and the Upper Mississippi downstream from Fort Snelling. Minnesota is geologically quiet today; it experiences earthquakes infrequently, most of them minor.

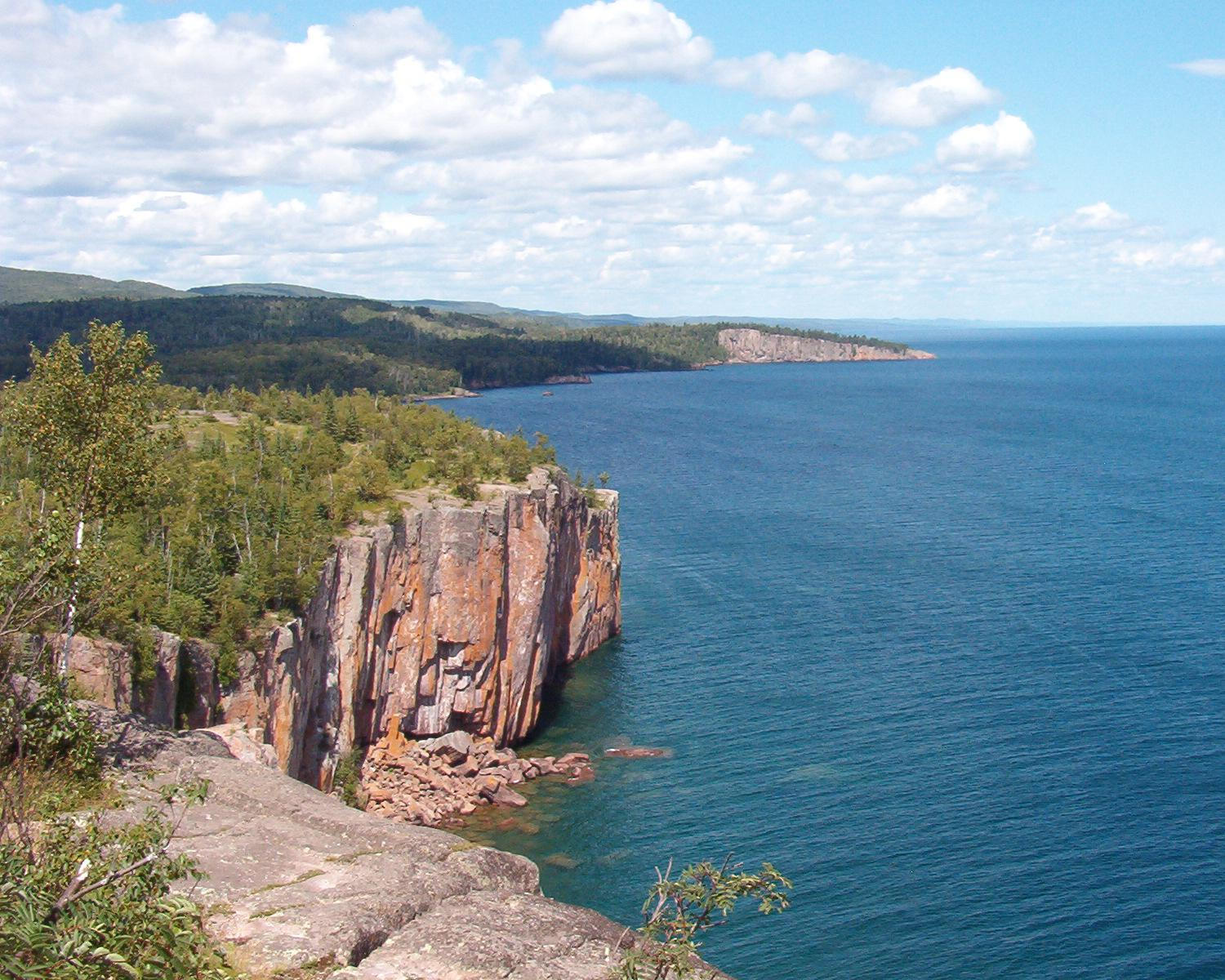
Palisade Head on Lake Superior was formed from a Precambrian rhyolitic lava flow.

The state's high point is Eagle Mountain at 2,301 feet (701 m), which is only 13 miles (21 km) away from the low point of 601 feet (183 m) at the shore of Lake Superior. Notwithstanding dramatic local differences in elevation, much of the state is a gently rolling peneplain.

Two major drainage divides meet in Minnesota's northeast in rural Hibbing, forming a triple watershed. Precipitation can follow the Mississippi River south to the Gulf of Mexico, the Saint Lawrence Seaway east to the Atlantic Ocean, or the Hudson Bay watershed to the Arctic Ocean.

The state's nickname "Land of 10,000 Lakes" is apt, as there are 11,842 Minnesota lakes over 10 acres (4 ha) in size. Minnesota's portion of Lake Superior is the largest (at 962,700 acres (389,600 ha; 3,896 km^{2})) and deepest (at 1,290 ft (390 m)) body of water in the state. Minnesota has 6,564 natural rivers and streams that cumulatively flow for 69,000 miles (111,000 km). The Mississippi River begins its journey from its headwaters at Lake Itasca and crosses the Iowa border 680 miles (1,090 km) downstream. It is joined by the Minnesota River at Fort Snelling, by the St. Croix River near Hastings, by the Chippewa River at Wabasha, and by many smaller streams. The Red River drains the northwest part of the state northward toward Canada's Hudson Bay. Approximately 10.6 million acres (4,300,000 ha; 43,000 km^{2}) of wetlands are within Minnesota's borders, the most of any state outside Alaska.

=== Flora and fauna ===
Minnesota has four ecological provinces: prairie parkland, in the southwestern and western parts of the state; the eastern broadleaf forest (Big Woods) in the southeast, extending in a narrowing strip to the state's northwestern part, where it transitions into tallgrass aspen parkland; and the northern Laurentian mixed forest, a transitional forest between the northern boreal forest and the broadleaf forests to the south. These northern forests are a vast wilderness of pine and spruce trees mixed with patchy stands of birch and poplar.

Much of Minnesota's northern forest has undergone logging, leaving only a few patches of old growth forest today in areas such as the Chippewa National Forest and the Superior National Forest, where the Boundary Waters Canoe Area Wilderness has some 400,000 acres (162,000 ha) of unlogged land. Although logging continues, regrowth and replanting keep about a third of the state forested. Nearly all Minnesota's prairies and oak savannas have been fragmented by farming, grazing, logging, and suburban development.

While loss of habitat has affected native animals such as the pine marten, elk, woodland caribou, and bison, others like whitetail deer and bobcat thrive. Minnesota has the nation's largest populations of timber wolves and trumpeter swans outside Alaska, and supports healthy populations of black bears, moose, and gophers. Located on the Mississippi Flyway, Minnesota hosts migratory waterfowl such as geese and ducks, and game birds such as grouse, pheasants, and turkeys. It is home to birds of prey, including the largest number of breeding pairs of bald eagles in the lower 48 states as of 2007, red-tailed hawks, and snowy owls. Hawk Ridge is one of the premier birdwatching sites in North America. The lakes teem with sport fish such as walleye, bass, muskellunge, and northern pike, while brook, brown, and rainbow trout populate streams in the southeast and northeast.

=== Climate ===
Minnesota's Köppen climate types

Minnesota experiences temperature extremes characteristic of its continental climate, with cold winters and hot summers. The lowest temperature recorded was −60 °F (−51 °C) at Tower on February 2, 1996. The highest was 114 °F (46 °C) at Moorhead on July 6, 1936. Meteorological events include rain, snow, blizzards, thunderstorms, hail, derechos, tornadoes, and high-velocity straight-line winds. The growing season varies from 90 days in the far northeast to 160 days in southeast Minnesota near the Mississippi River. Average temperatures range from 37 to 49 °F (3 to 9 °C). Average summer dewpoints range from about 58 °F (14 °C) in the south to about 48 °F (9 °C) in the north. Average annual precipitation ranges from 19 to 35 inches (48 to 89 cm). Droughts occur every 10 to 50 years.

Minnesota has been affected by climate change and warmed over the past few years. Rising temperatures have affected natural habitats and many species that live in them. For example, the lakes' water is warming, which affects fish populations: trout, a cold-water fish, is losing its habitat, while the habitat of bass, a warm-water fish, is growing.

Average daily maximum and minimum temperatures for selected cities in Minnesota
Location	July (°F)	July (°C)	January (°F)	January (°C)
Minneapolis	83/64	28/18	23/7	−4/−13
Saint Paul	83/63	28/17	23/6	−5/−14
Rochester	82/63	28/17	23/3	−5/−16
Duluth	76/55	24/13	19/1	−7/−17
St. Cloud	81/58	27/14	18/−1	−7/−18
Mankato	86/62	30/16	23/3	−5/−16
International Falls	77/52	25/11	15/−6	−9/−21

=== Protected lands ===
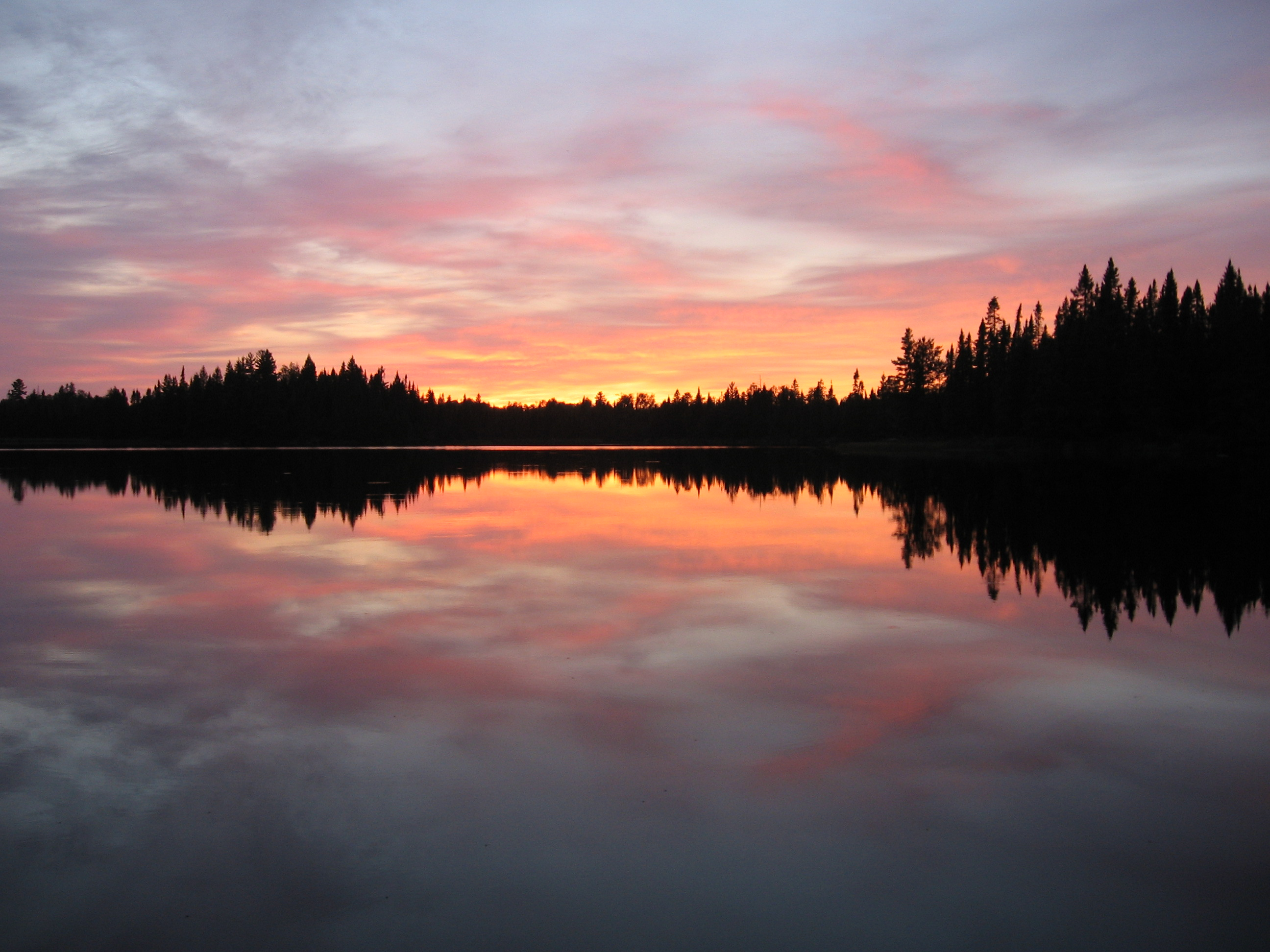
Pose Lake in the Boundary Waters Canoe Area Wilderness

Minnesota's first state park, Itasca State Park, was established in 1891, and is the source of the Mississippi River. Today Minnesota has 72 state parks and recreation areas, 58 state forests covering about four million acres (16,000 km^{2}), and numerous state wildlife preserves, all managed by the Minnesota Department of Natural Resources. The Chippewa and Superior national forests comprise 5.5 million acres (22,000 km^{2}). The Superior National Forest in the northeast contains the Boundary Waters Canoe Area Wilderness, which encompasses over a million acres (4,000 km^{2}) and a thousand lakes. To its west is Voyageurs National Park. The Mississippi National River and Recreation Area (MNRRA) is a 72-mile-long (116 km) corridor along the Mississippi River through the Minneapolis–St. Paul Metropolitan Area connecting a variety of sites of historic, cultural, and geologic interest.

== Cities and towns ==
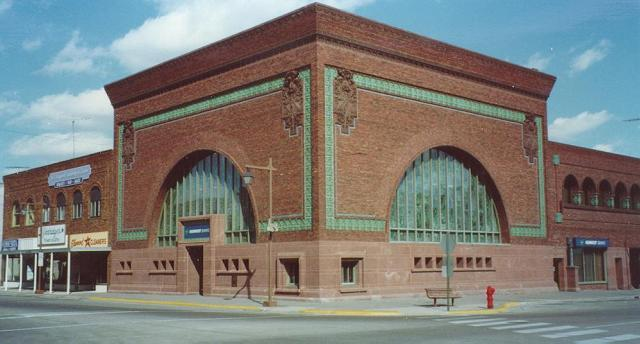
National Farmers Bank in Owatonna by Louis Sullivan

Minnesota cities, counties, and towns.

Saint Paul, in east-central Minnesota along the banks of the Mississippi River, has been Minnesota's capital city since 1849, first as capital of the Territory of Minnesota, and then as the state capital since 1858.

Saint Paul is adjacent to Minnesota's most populous city, Minneapolis; they and their suburbs are collectively known as the Twin Cities metropolitan area, the country's 16th-largest metropolitan area and home to about 55% of the state's population. The remainder of the state is known as "Greater Minnesota" or "Outstate Minnesota".

The state has 17 cities with populations above 50,000 as of the 2020 census. In descending order of population, they are Minneapolis, Saint Paul, Rochester, Duluth, Bloomington, Brooklyn Park, Plymouth, Saint Cloud, Woodbury, Eagan, Maple Grove, Coon Rapids, Eden Prairie, Minnetonka, Burnsville, Apple Valley, Blaine, and Lakeville. Of these, only Rochester, Duluth, and Saint Cloud are outside the Twin Cities metropolitan area.

Minnesota's population continues to grow, primarily in the urban centers. The populations of metropolitan Sherburne and Scott counties doubled between 1980 and 2000, while 40 of the state's 87 counties lost residents over the same period.

Largest cities or towns in Minnesota Source:
Rank	Name	County	Pop.
1	Minneapolis	Hennepin	425,336
2	Saint Paul	Ramsey	307,193
3	Rochester	Olmsted	121,465
4	Bloomington	Hennepin	89,298
5	Duluth	St. Louis	86,372
6	Brooklyn Park	Hennepin	84,526
7	Plymouth	Hennepin	79,828
8	Woodbury	Washington	76,990
9	Lakeville	Dakota	72,812
10	Blaine	Anoka	70,935

The United States Navy has recognized multiple Minnesota communities.

== Demographics ==
=== Overview ===
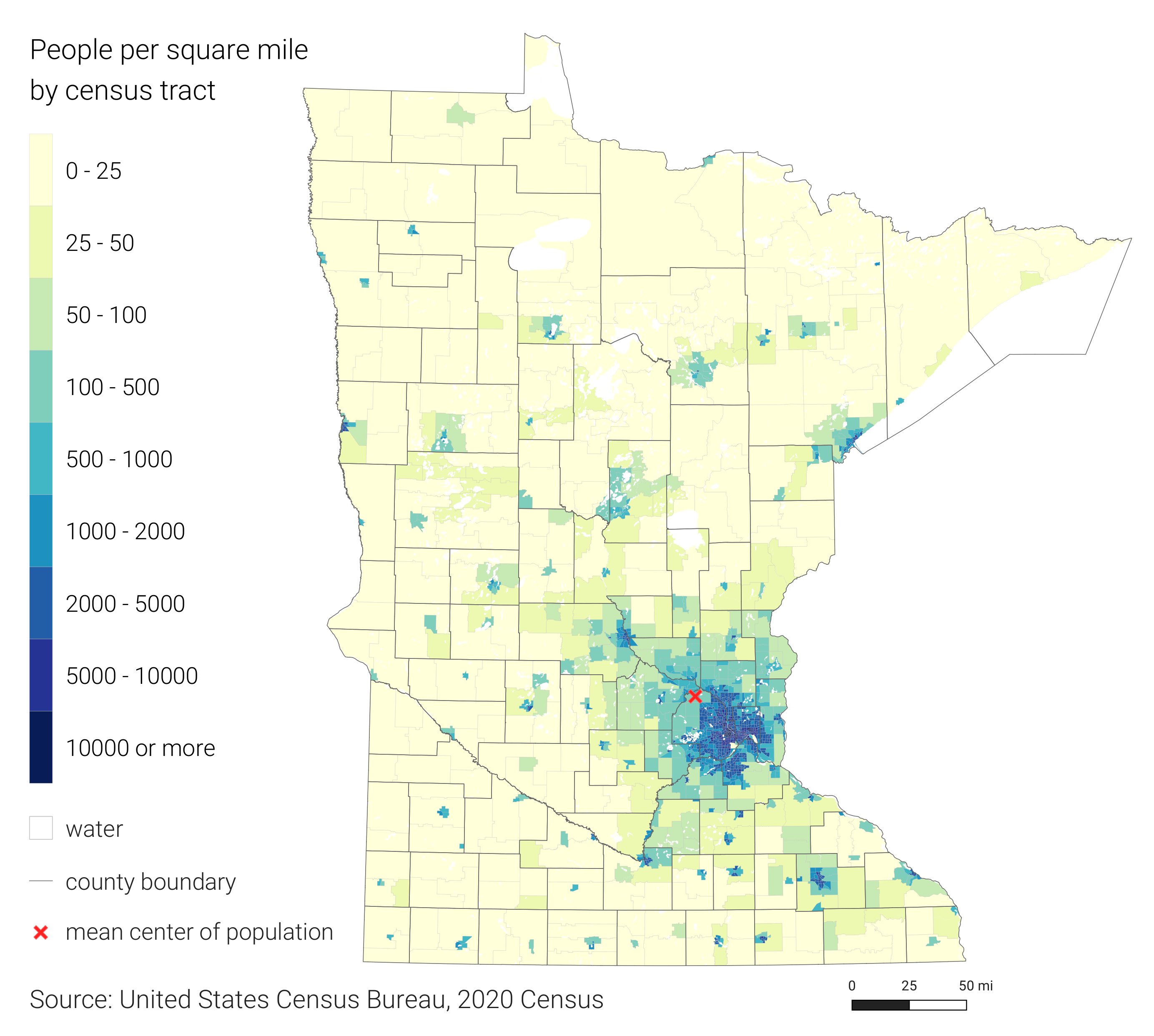
A map of Minnesota's population density, 2020

Historical population
Census	Pop.	Note	%±
1850	6,077		—
1860	172,023		2,730.7%
1870	439,706		155.6%
1880	780,773		77.6%
1890	1,310,283		67.8%
1900	1,751,394		33.7%
1910	2,075,708		18.5%
1920	2,387,125		15.0%
1930	2,563,953		7.4%
1940	2,792,300		8.9%
1950	2,982,483		6.8%
1960	3,413,864		14.5%
1970	3,804,971		11.5%
1980	4,075,970		7.1%
1990	4,375,099		7.3%
2000	4,919,479		12.4%
2010	5,303,925		7.8%
2020	5,706,494		7.6%
2025 (est.)	5,830,405		2.2%
Source: 1910–2020; 2022 Estimate

According to the United States Census Bureau and the Minnesota State Demographic Center, Minnesota had a population of about 5.7 million in 2020, making it the 22nd-most populous U.S. state. Its fertility rate in 2021 was slightly below the replacement rate at 1.75, but the state has seen growth over the past century through more births than deaths, and significant immigration. A destination for European immigrants in the late 19th and early 20th centuries, primarily from Scandinavia, Germany, and Ireland, it now attracts people from Latin America, primarily Mexico; East Africa, particularly Somalis and Ethiopians; and South and Southeast Asia, especially Hmong, Vietnamese, Karen, and Indian people. The state has a diverse population in terms of age, birthplace, ancestry, and socioeconomic status, with a well-educated populace and a median household income around $77,000.

=== Race and ethnicity ===
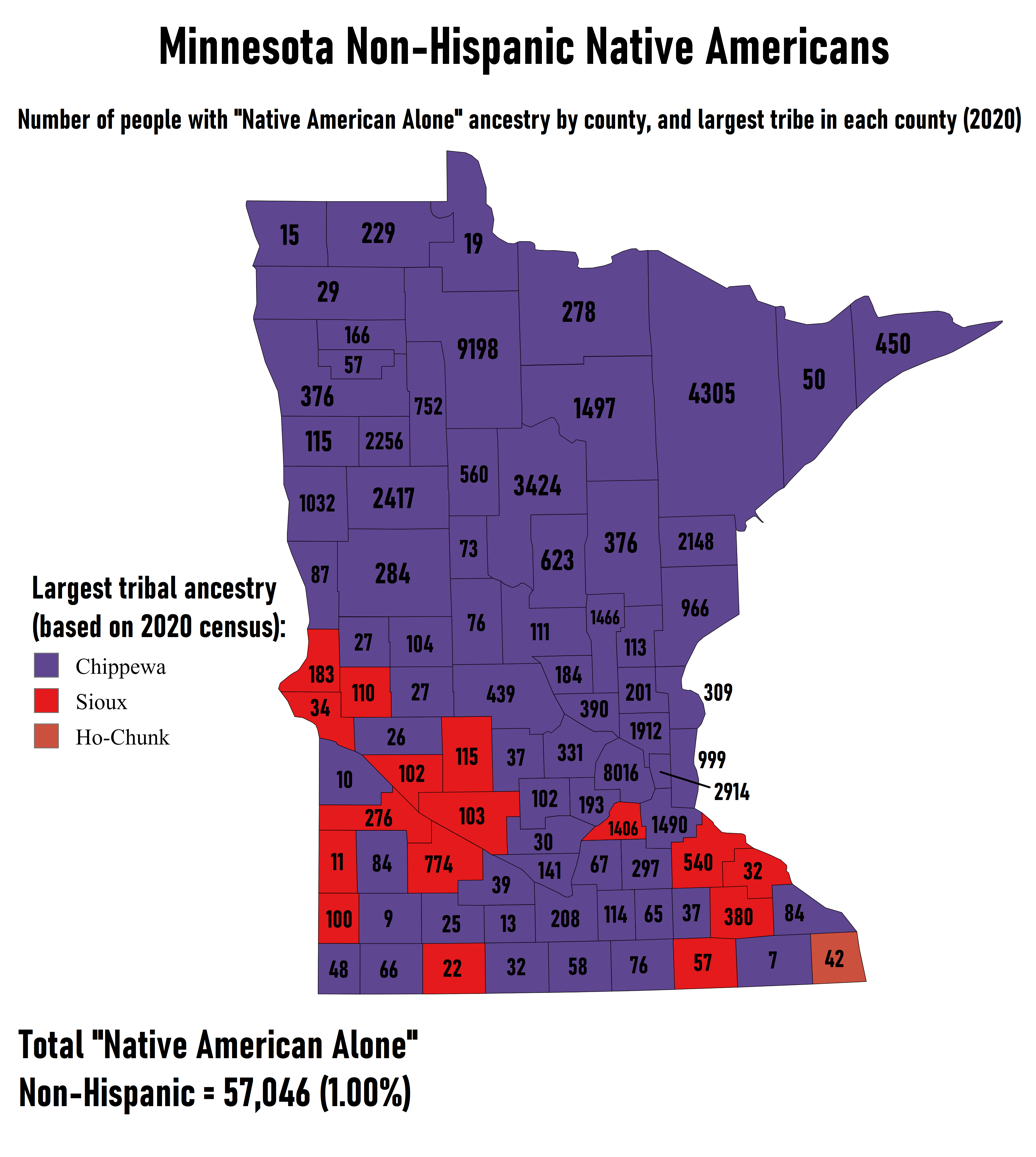

Minnesota's racial demographics have significantly diversified since its early settlement period. As of 2020, according to U.S. census data, the white population had fallen to 77.5% from over 98% in the early to mid-20th century. Concurrently, other racial populations have markedly increased. The Black population has risen to 7%, the Asian population to 5.3%, and those identifying as two or more races to 6.1%.

Racial composition in 2020
Race	Percentage
White	77.5%
Black or African American	7.0%
American Indian	1.2%
Asian	5.3%
Pacific Islander	0.1%
Other race	3.2%
Two or more races	6.1%

Minnesota – Racial and ethnic composition Note: the US Census treats Hispanic/Latino as an ethnic category. This table excludes Latinos from the racial categories and assigns them to a separate category. Hispanics/Latinos may be of any race.
Race / Ethnicity (NH = Non-Hispanic)	Pop 1980	Pop 1990	Pop 2000	Pop 2010	Pop 2020	% 1980	% 1990	% 2000	% 2010	% 2020
White alone (NH)	3,916,519	4,101,266	4,337,143	4,405,142	4,353,880	96.09%	93.74%	88.16%	83.05%	76.30%
Black or African American alone (NH)	52,576	93,040	168,813	269,141	392,850	1.29%	2.13%	3.43%	5.07%	6.88%
Native American or Alaska Native alone (NH)	35,003	48,251	52,009	55,421	57,046	0.86%	1.10%	1.06%	1.04%	1.00%
Asian alone (NH)	26,530	76,229	141,083	212,996	297,460	0.65%	1.74%	2.87%	4.02%	5.21%
Native Hawaiian or Pacific Islander alone (NH)	x	x	1,714	1,860	2,621	x	x	0.03%	0.04%	0.05%
Other race alone (NH)	13,219	2,429	5,031	5,947	20,963	0.32%	0.06%	0.10%	0.11%	0.37%
Mixed race or Multiracial (NH)	x	x	70,304	103,160	236,034	x	x	1.43%	1.94%	4.14%
Hispanic or Latino (any race)	32,123	53,884	143,382	250,258	345,640	0.79%	1.23%	2.91%	4.72%	6.06%
Total	4,075,970	4,375,099	4,919,479	5,303,925	5,706,494	100.00%	100.00%	100.00%	100.00%	100.00%

==== 2025 American Community Survey one-year estimates ====
Racial Makeup of Minnesota (2025): 1. White alone (74.5%); 2. Black alone (7.45%); 3. Native American alone (1.16%); 4. Asian Alone (5.58%); 5. Pacific Islander Alone (0.02%); 6. Other race alone (2.84%); 7. Two or more races (8.48%)	Racial/Ethnic Makeup of Minnesota excluding Hispanics from racial categories (2025); NH=Non-Hispanic: 1. White NH (73.1%); 2. Black NH (7.37%); 3. Native American NH (0.86%); 4. Asian NH (5.55%); 5. Pacific Islander NH (0.02%); 6. Other race NH (0.42%); 7. Two or more races NH (5.45%); 8. Hispanic Any Race (7.22%)	Racial Makeup of Hispanics in Minnesota (2025): 1. White alone (18.8%); 2. Black alone (1.16%); 3. Native American alone (4.07%); 4. Asian Alone (0.42%); 5. Pacific Islander Alone (0.01%); 6. Other race alone (33.5%); 7. Two or more races (42.0%)

In the 2017 American Community Survey, 5.1% of Minnesota's population were of Hispanic or Latino origin (of any race): Mexican (3.5%), Puerto Rican (0.2%), Cuban (0.1%), and other Hispanic or Latino origin (1.2%). The ancestry groups claimed by more than 5% of the population were German (33.8%), Norwegian (15.3%), Irish (10.5%), Swedish (8.1%), and English (5.4%). Minnesota has the country's largest Somali population, and the largest Hmong population per capita. Minnesota also has the largest Norwegian American and Swedish American populations.

=== Immigration ===
Since the 1960s, Minnesota's immigrant population has been shaped by its status as a major area for refugee resettlement. As of 2018, Minnesota had the largest refugee population per capita of any state, with 2% of the country's population but 13% of its refugees. The largest groups of refugees over the past decades have been Hmongs, Somalis, Ethiopians, and Vietnamese; other major refugee groups that have recently been settling in Minnesota include Burmese, Liberians, Ecuadorians, Congolese, Russians, and Ukrainians. Minnesota also receives large numbers of non-refugee immigrants, primarily from Mexico, India, China, Korea, and Canada.

Country of origin of first and second-generation immigrants (2023)
Country	Population
Mexico	95,227
Somalia	76,658
Hmong people (Note: Hmong people are a stateless group; the majority of Hmong in Minnesota have immigrated from either Laos or Thailand.)	55,005
India	39,559
Ethiopia	36,982
Laos	24,901
China	24,353
Vietnam	22,283
Liberia	20,168
South Korea	20,126
Thailand	19,235
Canada	18,804
Kenya	16,823
Myanmar	15,679
Philippines	13,544
Russia	12,787
El Salvador	12,137
Nigeria	9,508
Guatemala	7,727
Ecuador	6,298

=== Religion ===
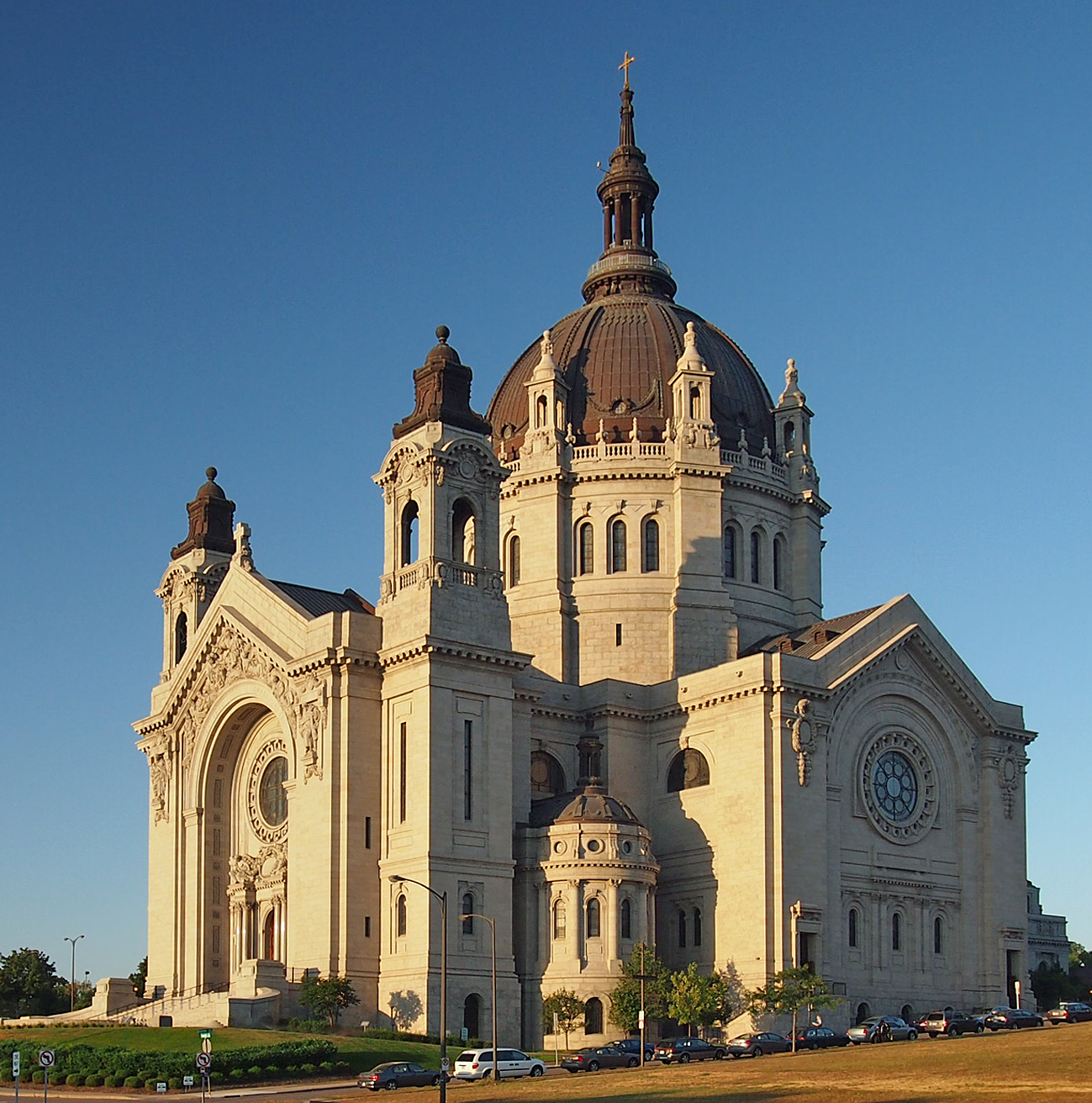
The French Renaissance style Cathedral of St. Paul in the city of St. Paul

Minnesota's religious landscape is also diverse, having evolved significantly over its history. The area's first Christian influence came from Catholic missionaries in the 17th and 18th centuries. 19th-century European settlers, especially Scandinavians, established Protestant denominations, particularly Lutheranism. Catholicism also continued to be significant due to Irish immigrants, and the Archdiocese of Saint Paul and Minneapolis serves a substantial Catholic community. The 20th and 21st centuries witnessed growth in other Christian denominations and non-Christian religions due to further immigration, leading to the establishment of Buddhist, Hmong folk religion, Muslim, and Hindu communities, as well as a sizable Jewish community. A growing number of people identify as non-religious, in line with national trends. As of 2014, 74% of Minnesotans identified as Christian, 5% belonged to non-Christian faiths, and 20% identified as religiously unaffiliated, according to the Pew Research Center.

=== Languages ===
Minnesota does not have an official language, although English is dominant, spoken by about 90% of residents. Other languages spoken include Spanish, Somali, Hmong, Vietnamese, Chinese, Russian, Arabic, Amharic, and Karen.

== Economy ==
Once primarily a producer of raw materials, Minnesota's economy has transformed to emphasize finished products and services. Perhaps the most significant characteristic of the economy is its diversity; the relative outputs of its business sectors closely match the United States as a whole.

In 2025, Minnesota's gross domestic product was $531.4 billion, with 33 of the United States' top 1,000 publicly traded companies by revenue headquartered in Minnesota, including Target, UnitedHealth Group, 3M, General Mills, U.S. Bancorp, Ameriprise, Hormel, Land O' Lakes, SuperValu, Best Buy, and Valspar. Private companies based in Minnesota include Cargill, the largest privately owned company in the United States, and Carlson Companies, the parent company of Radisson Hotels.

Minnesota's per capita personal income was $78,538 in 2025, the 13th-highest in the nation. Its 2019 median household income was $74,593, ranking thirteenth in the U.S. and fifth among the 36 states not on the Atlantic coast. As of May 2025, the unemployment rate was 3.3%.

=== Industry and commerce ===
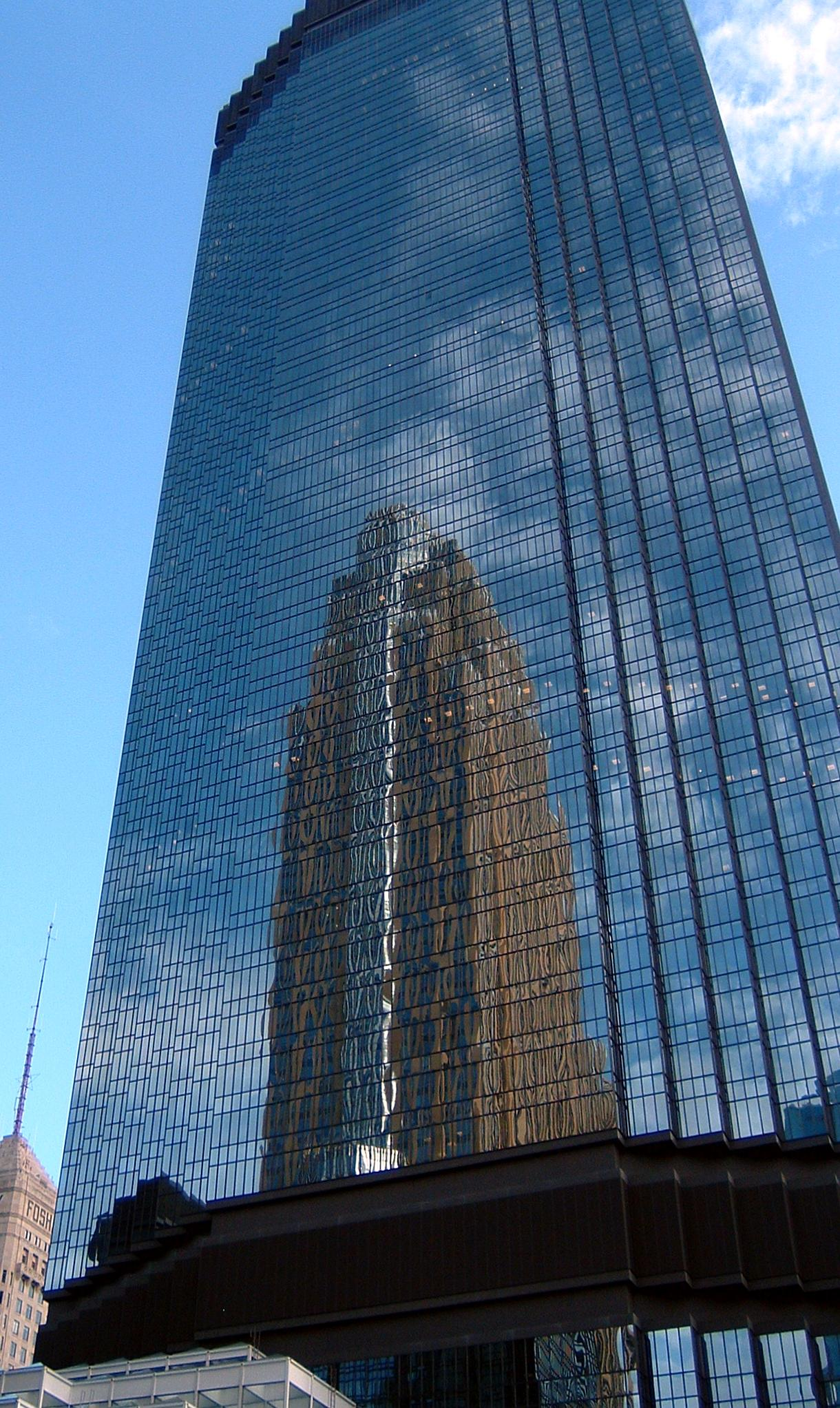
The IDS Tower, designed by Philip Johnson, is the state's tallest building, reflecting César Pelli's Art Deco-style Wells Fargo Center.

Minnesota's earliest industries were fur trading and agriculture. Minneapolis grew around the flour mills powered by St. Anthony Falls. Although less than 1% of the population is now employed in the agricultural sector, it remains a major part of the state's economy, ranking sixth in the nation in the value of products sold. The state is the nation's largest producer of sugar beets, sweet corn, peas for processing, and farm-raised turkeys. Minnesota is a large producer of corn and soybeans, and has the most food cooperatives per capita in the United States.

Forestry remains strong, including logging, pulpwood processing and paper production, and forest products manufacturing. Minnesota was famous for its soft-ore mines, which produced a significant portion of the world's iron ore for more than a century. Although the high-grade ore is now depleted, taconite mining continues, using processes developed locally to save the industry. In 2016 the state produced 60% of the country's usable iron ore. The mining boom created the port of Duluth, which continues to be important for shipping ore, coal, and agricultural products.

The manufacturing sector now includes technology and biomedical firms, in addition to the older food processors and heavy industry. The nation's first indoor shopping mall was Edina's Southdale Center, and its largest is Bloomington's Mall of America. Minnesota is one of 45 U.S. states with its own lottery; its games include multi-jurisdiction draws and in-house draws.

==== Largest employers ====
As of 2026, Minnesota's largest employers were:

Company	Employees in Minnesota	Headquartered in Minnesota?
Mayo Clinic	57,159	Yes
State of Minnesota	46,485	Yes
M Health Fairview	33,941	Yes
Target Corporation	32,000	Yes
Allina Health	27,677	Yes
HealthPartners	26,100	Yes
Walmart	25,205	No
University of Minnesota	23,171	Yes
Federal government	19,076	No
UnitedHealth Group	18,000	Yes
Minnesota State Colleges and Universities system	13,969	Yes
Essentia Health	12,965	Yes
CentraCare Health	10,692	Yes
U.S. Bancorp	10,102	Yes
Wells Fargo	10,000	No
Medtronic	10,000	No

=== Energy use and production ===
Minnesota produces ethanol fuel and is the first to mandate its use, a 10% mix (E10). In 2019, there were more than 411 service stations supplying E85 fuel, comprising 85% ethanol and 15% gasoline. A 2% biodiesel blend has been required in diesel fuel since 2005. Minnesota is ranked in the top ten for wind energy production. In 2018, Minnesota generated nearly one-fifth of its electrical energy from wind.

Xcel Energy is the state's largest utility and is headquartered in the state; it is one of five investor-owned utilities. There are also a number of municipal utilities. There are 44 electric distribution cooperatives serving retail electric consumers throughout the state.

=== State taxes ===
Minnesota has a progressive income tax structure. The four brackets of state income tax rates are 5.35%, 7.05%, 7.85%, and 9.85%. In 2025, Minnesota ranked 10th in the nation in per capita total state and local taxes. In 2022, Minnesotans paid 12.1% of their income in state and local taxes; the U.S. average was 11.2%. The state sales tax in Minnesota is 6.875%. Clothing, prescription drug medications and food items for home consumption are exempt. The state legislature may allow municipalities to institute local sales taxes and special local taxes, such as the 0.5% supplemental sales tax in Minneapolis. Excise taxes are levied on alcohol, tobacco, and motor fuel. The state imposes a use tax on items purchased elsewhere but used in Minnesota. Owners of real property in Minnesota pay property tax to their county, municipality, school district, and special taxing districts.

== Culture ==
=== Fine and performing arts ===
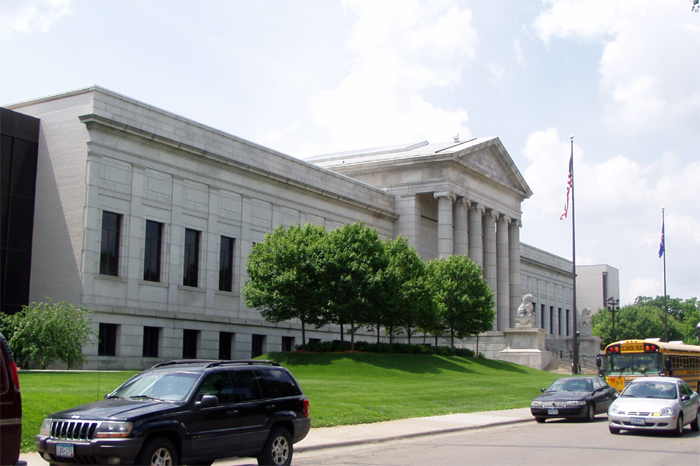
The Minneapolis Institute of Art's Neoclassical north facade, designed by McKim, Mead, and White.

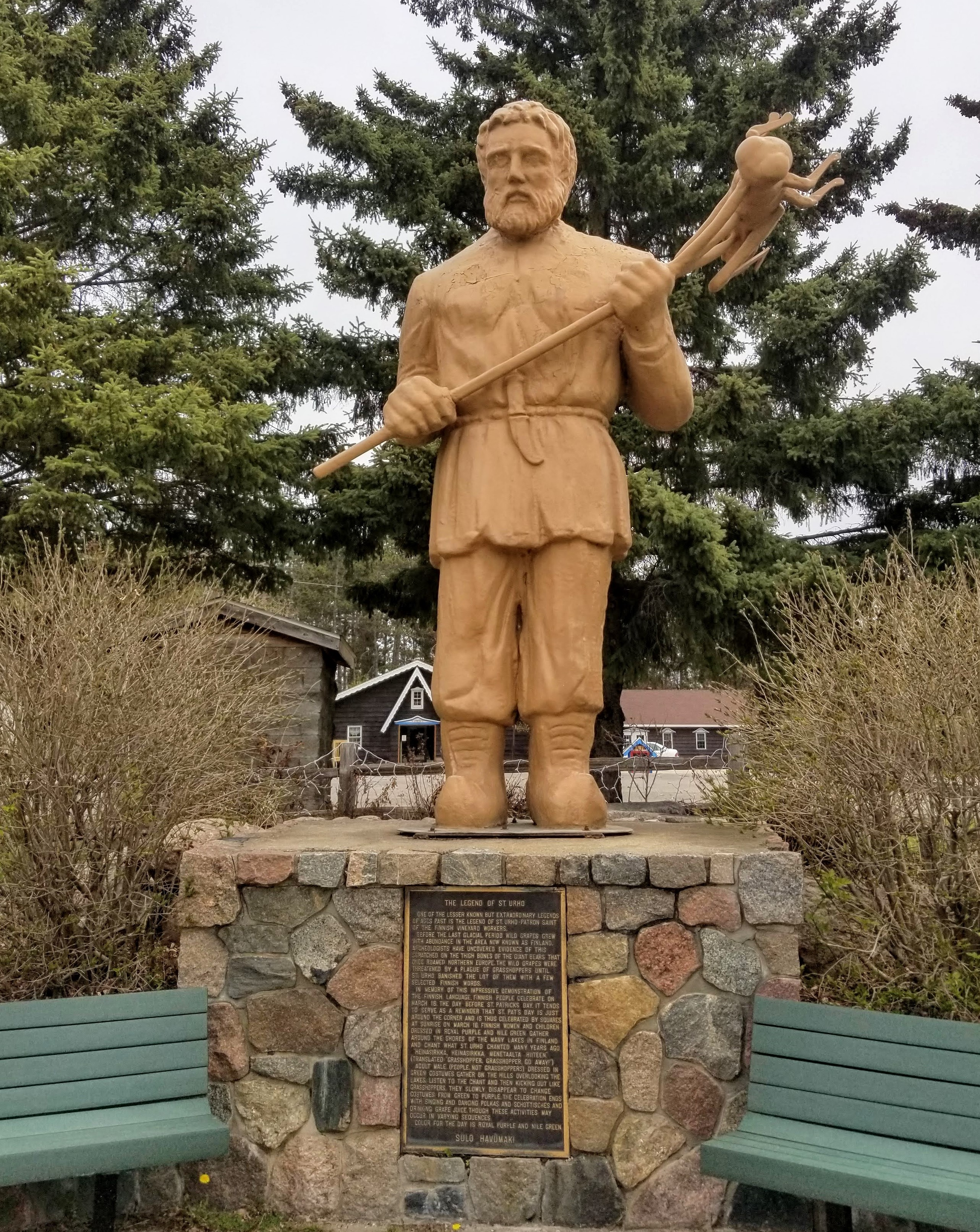
A sculpture of St. Urho in Menahga, Minnesota, in 2020.

Minnesota's leading fine art museums include the Minneapolis Institute of Art, the Walker Art Center, the Frederick R. Weisman Art Museum, and The Museum of Russian Art (TMORA). All are in Minneapolis. The Minnesota Orchestra and the Saint Paul Chamber Orchestra are prominent full-time professional musical ensembles who perform concerts and offer educational programs to the Twin Cities' community. The world-renowned Guthrie Theater moved into a new Minneapolis facility in 2006, boasting three stages and overlooking the Mississippi River.

Attendance at theatrical, musical, and comedy events in the area is strong. In the United States, Minneapolis's number of theater companies ranks behind only New York City's, and about 2.3 million theater tickets were sold in the Twin Cities annually as of 2006. The Minnesota Fringe Festival in Minneapolis is an annual celebration of theatre, dance, improvisation, puppetry, kids' shows, visual art, and musicals with more than 800 performances over 11 days. It is the country's largest non-juried performing arts festival.

=== Literature ===
The rigors and rewards of pioneer life on the prairie are the subject of Giants in the Earth by Ole Rolvaag and the Little House series of children's books by Laura Ingalls Wilder. Small-town life is portrayed grimly by Sinclair Lewis in the novel Main Street, and more gently and affectionately by Garrison Keillor in his tales of Lake Wobegon.

St. Paul native F. Scott Fitzgerald wrote of the social insecurities and aspirations of the young city in stories such as Winter Dreams and The Ice Palace, published in Flappers and Philosophers. Henry Wadsworth Longfellow's epic poem The Song of Hiawatha was inspired by Minnesota and names of many of the state's places and bodies of water. Minnesota native Bob Dylan won the 2016 Nobel Prize in Literature. Science fiction writer Marissa Lingen lives here.

=== Entertainment ===
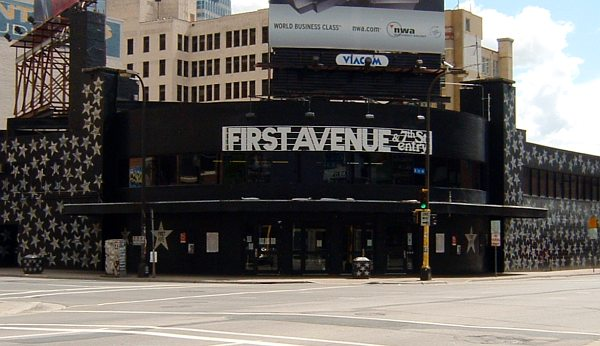
First Avenue nightclub, the heart of Minnesota's music community.

Minnesota musicians include Prince, Bob Dylan, Eddie Cochran, The Andrews Sisters, The Castaways, The Trashmen, Soul Asylum, David Ellefson, Chad Smith, John Wozniak, Hüsker Dü, Semisonic, The Replacements, Owl City, Holly Henry, Motion City Soundtrack, Atmosphere, and Dessa. Minnesotans helped shape the history of music through popular American culture: the Andrews Sisters' "Boogie Woogie Bugle Boy" was an iconic tune of World War II, while the Trashmen's "Surfin' Bird" and Bob Dylan epitomize two sides of the 1960s. In the 1980s, influential hit radio groups and musicians included Prince, The Original 7ven, Jimmy Jam & Terry Lewis, The Jets, Lipps Inc., and Information Society.

Minnesotans have also made significant contributions to comedy, theater, media, and film. The comic strip Peanuts was created by St. Paul native Charles M. Schulz. A Prairie Home Companion which first aired in 1974, became a long-running comedy radio show on National Public Radio. A cult sci-fi cable TV show, Mystery Science Theater 3000, was created by Joel Hodgson in Hopkins, and Minneapolis, MN. Another popular comedy staple developed in the 1990s, The Daily Show, was originated through Lizz Winstead and Madeleine Smithberg.

Joel and Ethan Coen, Terry Gilliam, Bill Pohlad, and Mike Todd contributed to the art of filmmaking as writers, directors, and producers. Notable actors from Minnesota include Loni Anderson, Richard Dean Anderson, James Arness, Jessica Biel, Rachael Leigh Cook, Julia Duffy, Mike Farrell, Judy Garland, Peter Graves, Josh Hartnett, Garrett Hedlund, Tippi Hedren, Jessica Lange, Kelly Lynch, E.G. Marshall, Laura Osnes, Melissa Peterman, Chris Pratt, Marion Ross, Jane Russell, Winona Ryder, Seann William Scott, Kevin Sorbo, Lea Thompson, Vince Vaughn, Jesse Ventura, James Hong, and Steve Zahn.

=== Popular culture ===
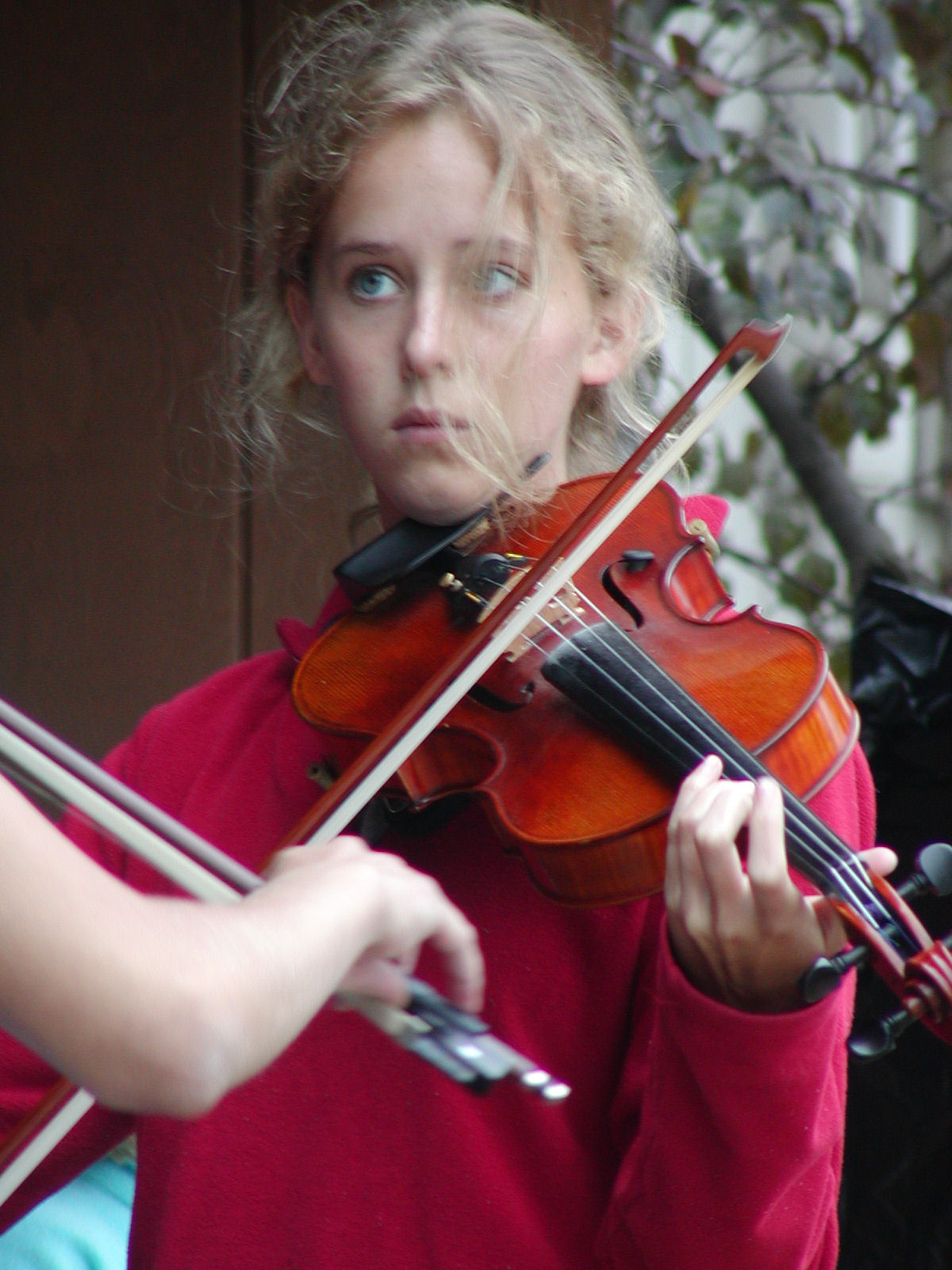
A youth fiddle performance at the Minnesota State Fair.

Stereotypical traits of Minnesotans include "Minnesota nice", Lutheranism, a strong sense of community and shared culture, and a distinctive brand of North Central American English featuring Scandinavian expressions. Potlucks, usually with a variety of hotdishes, are popular small-town church activities. A small segment of the Scandinavian population attend a traditional lutefisk dinner to celebrate Christmas.

Life in Minnesota has also been depicted or used as a backdrop, in movies such as Fargo, Grumpy Old Men, Grumpier Old Men, Juno, Drop Dead Gorgeous, Young Adult, A Serious Man, New in Town, Rio, The Mighty Ducks films, and in famous television series like Little House on the Prairie, The Mary Tyler Moore Show, The Golden Girls, Coach, The Rocky and Bullwinkle Show, How I Met Your Mother and Fargo. Major movies shot on location in Minnesota include That Was Then... This Is Now, Purple Rain, Airport, Beautiful Girls, North Country, Untamed Heart, Feeling Minnesota, Jingle All The Way, and A Simple Plan.

The Minnesota State Fair, advertised as The Great Minnesota Get-Together, is an icon of state culture. In a state of 5.5 million people, there were more than 1.8 million visitors to the fair in 2014, setting a new attendance record. The fair covers the variety of Minnesota life, including fine art, science, agriculture, food preparation, 4-H displays, music, the midway, and corporate merchandising. It is known for its displays of seed art, butter sculptures of dairy princesses, the birthing barn, and the "fattest pig" competition. In September 1927, John Philip Sousa and his band gave the premiere performance of "The Minnesota March" at the fair before a grandstand crowd of 12,000. One can also find dozens of varieties of food on a stick, such as Pronto Pups, cheese curds, and deep-fried candy bars. On a smaller scale, many of these attractions are offered at numerous county fairs.

Other large annual festivals include the Saint Paul Winter Carnival, the Minnesota Renaissance Festival, Minneapolis' Aquatennial and Mill City Music Festival, Moondance Jam in Walker, the Judy Garland Festival in Grand Rapids, the Eelpout Festival on Leech Lake, and the WE Fest in Detroit Lakes.

== Health ==
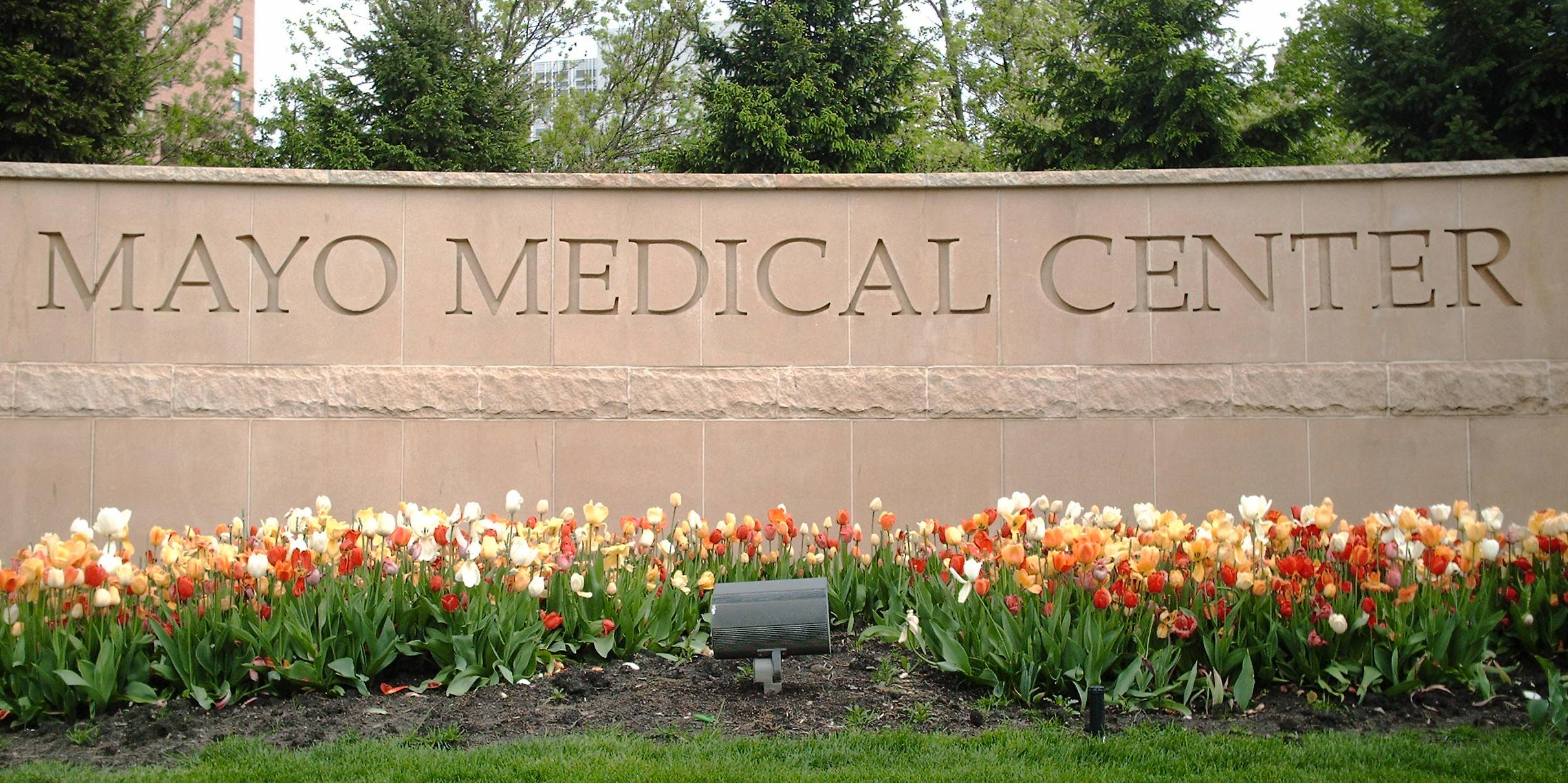
The Mayo Clinic in Rochester

Minnesotans have low rates of premature death, infant mortality, cardiovascular disease, and occupational fatalities. They have long life expectancies, and high rates of health insurance and regular exercise. These and other measures have led two groups to rank Minnesota as the healthiest state in the nation; however, in one of these rankings, Minnesota descended from first to sixth in the nation between 2005 and 2009 because of low levels of public health funding and the prevalence of binge drinking. While overall health indicators are strong, Minnesota has significant health disparities in minority populations.

In October 2007, the Freedom to Breathe Act took effect, outlawing smoking in restaurants and bars in Minnesota.

The Minnesota Department of Health is the primary state health agency responsible for public policy and regulation. Medical care in the state is provided by a comprehensive network of hospitals and clinics operated by a number of large providers including Allina Hospitals & Clinics, CentraCare Health System, Essentia Health, HealthPartners, M Health Fairview and the Mayo Clinic Health System. There are two teaching hospitals and medical schools in Minnesota. The University of Minnesota Medical School is a high-rated teaching institution that has made a number of breakthroughs in treatment, and its research activities contribute significantly to the state's growing biotechnology industry. The Mayo Clinic, a world-renowned hospital based in Rochester, was founded by William Worrall Mayo, an immigrant from England.

U.S. News & World Report's 2020–21 survey ranked 4,554 hospitals in the country in 12 specialized fields of care, and placed the Mayo Clinic in the top four in most fields. The hospital ranked first on the best hospitals honor roll. The only specialty where it fell outside the top ten was ophthalmology. The Mayo Clinic and the University of Minnesota are partners in the Minnesota Partnership for Biotechnology and Medical Genomics, a state-funded program that conducts research into cancer, Alzheimer's disease, heart health, obesity, and other areas.

== Education ==
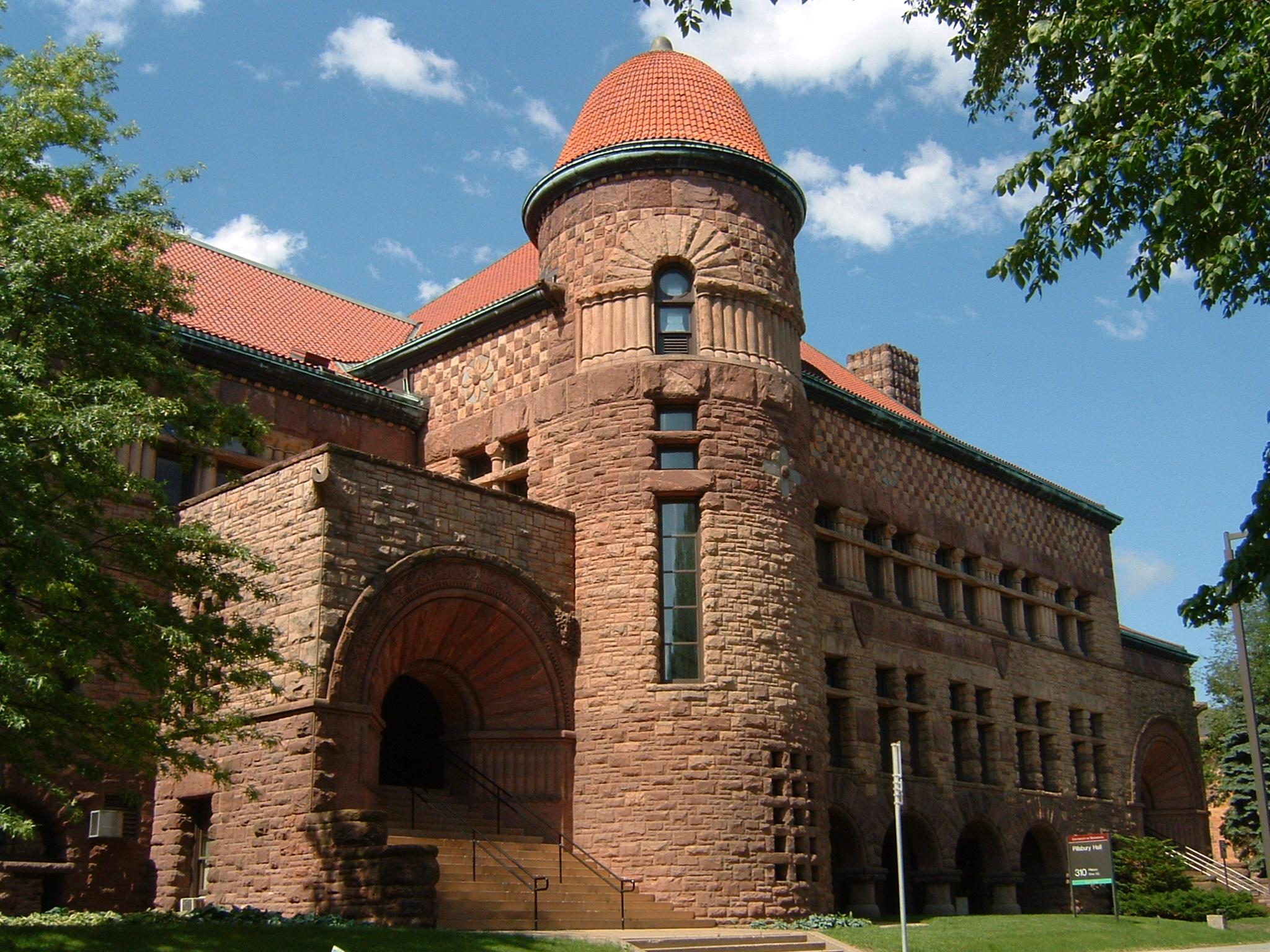
The Richardsonian Romanesque Pillsbury Hall (1889) is one of the oldest buildings on the University of Minnesota Minneapolis campus.

One of the first acts of the Minnesota Legislature when it opened in 1858 was the creation of a normal school in Winona. Minnesota's commitment to education has contributed to a literate and well-educated populace. In 2009, according to the U.S. Census Bureau, Minnesota had the second-highest proportion of high school graduates, with 91.5% of people 25 and older holding a high school diploma, and the tenth-highest proportion of people with bachelor's degrees.

In 2015, Minneapolis was named the nation's "Most Literate City", while St. Paul placed fourth, according to a major annual survey. In a 2013 study conducted by the National Center for Educational Statistics comparing the performance of eighth-grade students internationally in math and science, Minnesota ranked eighth in the world and third in the United States, behind Massachusetts and Vermont.

In 2014, Minnesota students had the nation's tenth-highest average composite score on the ACT exam. In 2013, Minnesota ranked 21st nationwide in per-student public education spending. Minnesota has chosen not to implement school vouchers, but is home to the first charter school.

The state supports a network of public universities and colleges, including 37 institutions in the Minnesota State Colleges and Universities System and five major campuses of the University of Minnesota system. It is also home to more than 20 private colleges and universities, six of which rank among the nation's top 100 liberal arts colleges, according to U.S. News & World Report.

== Transportation ==
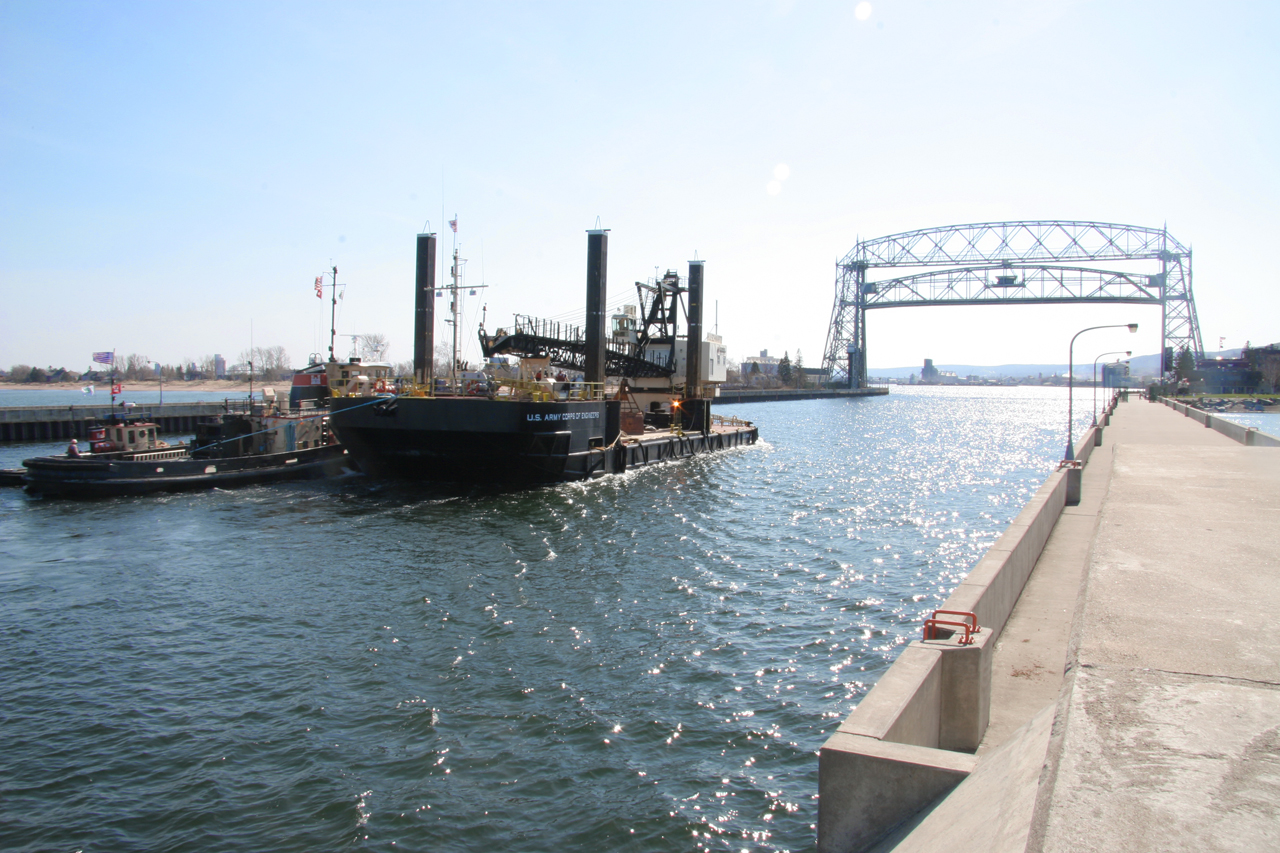
The Aerial Lift Bridge in Duluth

Transportation in Minnesota is overseen by the Minnesota Department of Transportation (MnDOT) at the state level and by regional and local governments at the local level. Principal transportation corridors radiate from the Twin Cities metropolitan area and along interstate corridors in Greater Minnesota. The major Interstate highways are Interstate 35 (I-35), I-90, and I-94, with I-35 and I-94 connecting the Minneapolis–St. Paul area, and I-90 traveling east–west along the state's southern edge.

In 2006, a constitutional amendment was passed that required sales and use taxes on motor vehicles to fund transportation, with at least 40% dedicated to public transit. There are nearly two dozen rail corridors in Minnesota, most of which go through Minneapolis–St. Paul or Duluth. There is water transportation along the Mississippi River system and from the ports of Lake Superior.

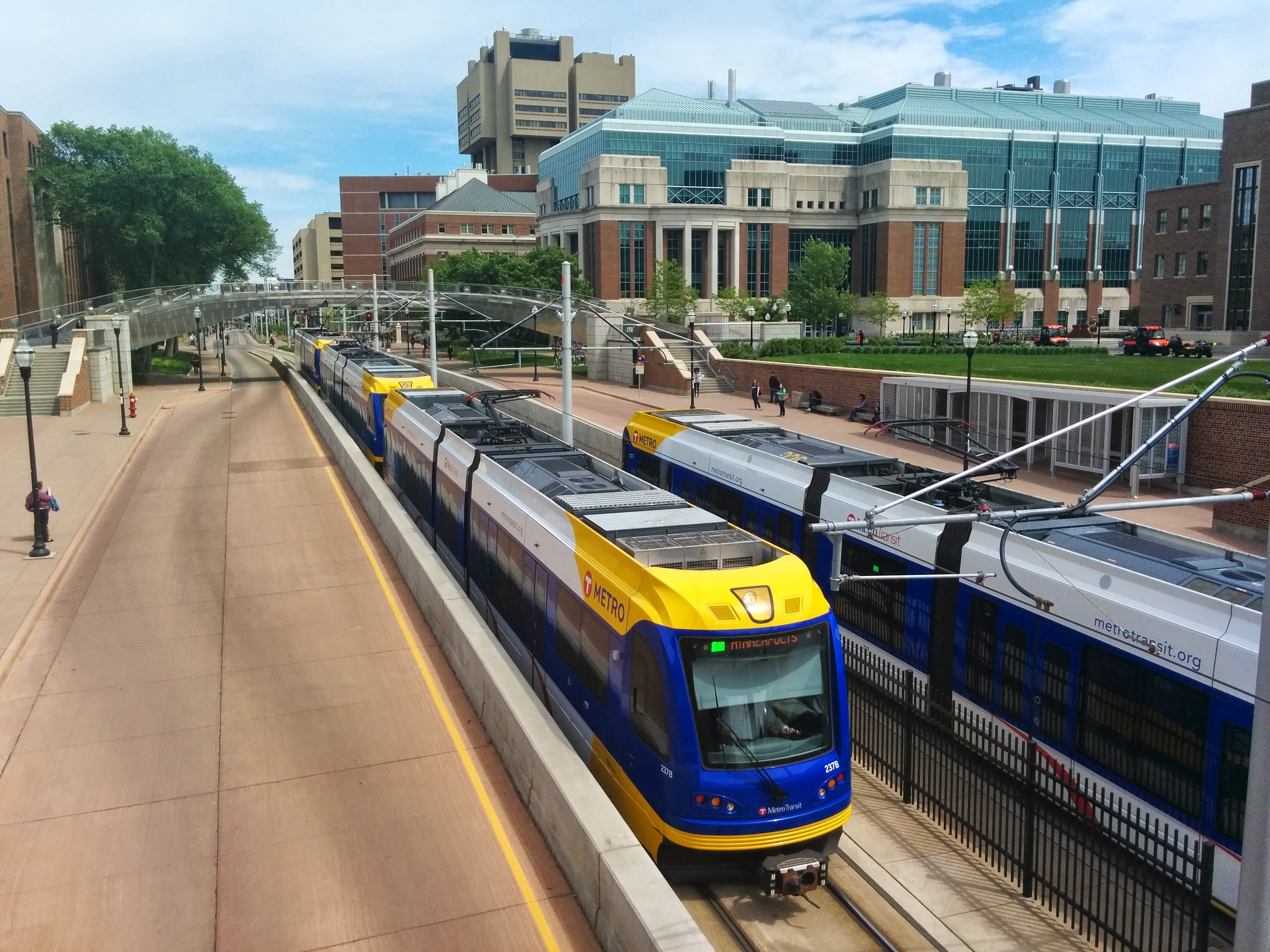
Two Metro Green Line trains on the University of Minnesota–Twin Cities campus

Minnesota's principal airport is Minneapolis–St. Paul International Airport (MSP), a major passenger and freight hub for Delta Air Lines and Sun Country Airlines. Most other domestic carriers serve the airport. Large commercial jet service is provided at Duluth and Rochester, with scheduled commuter service to four smaller cities via Delta Connection carriers SkyWest Airlines, Compass Airlines, and Endeavor Air.

Public transit services are available in the regional urban centers in Minnesota including Metro Transit in the Twin Cities, opt-out suburban operators Minnesota Valley Transit Authority, SouthWest Transit, Plymouth Metrolink, Maple Grove Transit and others. In Greater Minnesota transit services are provided by city systems such as Duluth Transit Authority, Mankato Transit System, MATBUS (Fargo-Moorhead), Rochester Public Transit, Saint Cloud Metro Bus, Winona Public Transit and others. Dial-a-Ride service is available for persons with disabilities in a majority of Minnesota counties.

Two daily Amtrak trains provide inter-city rail service. The Empire Builder (Chicago–Seattle/Portland) train runs through Minnesota, calling at the Saint Paul Union Depot and five other stations. The Borealis (Chicago–Saint Paul) train runs from Saint Paul to Chicago, on a portion of the tracks used by the Empire Builder. Intercity bus providers include Jefferson Lines, Greyhound, and Megabus. Local public transit is provided by bus networks in the larger cities and by two rail services. From Target Field station in downtown Minneapolis, light rail runs to Saint Paul Union Depot on the Green Line, and to the MSP airport and the Mall of America via the Blue Line.

== Law and government ==
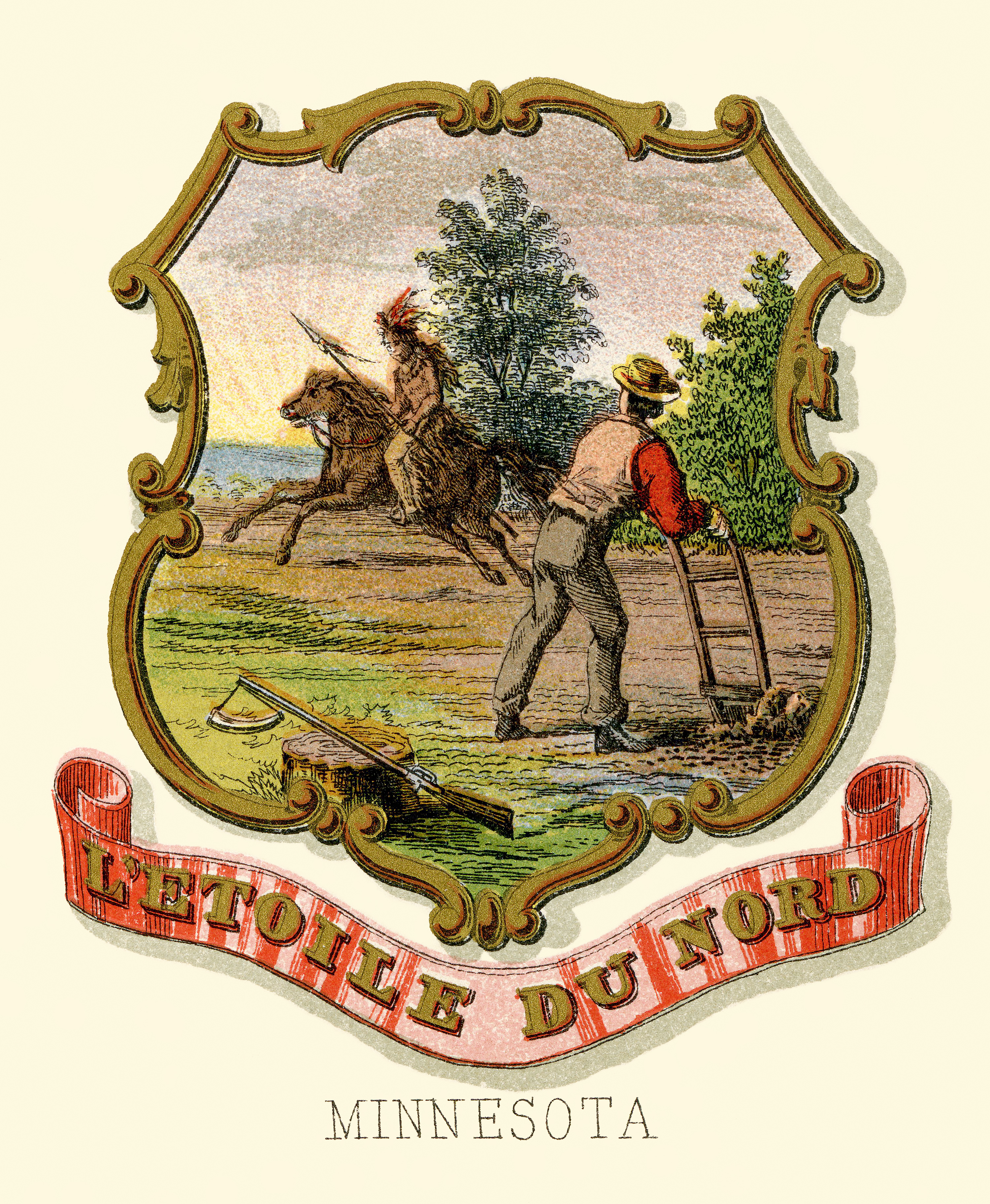
The historical coat of arms of Minnesota in 1876

Logo of the Minnesotan government

Minnesota is governed pursuant to the Minnesota Constitution, which was adopted on October 13, 1857, roughly one year before statehood. Like all U.S. states and the federal government, Minnesota has a republican system of political representation with power divided into three branches: executive, legislative, and judicial. The state constitution includes a bill of rights that reaffirms many of the same rights and freedoms as its federal counterpart, with some protected more strongly and explicitly.

=== Executive ===
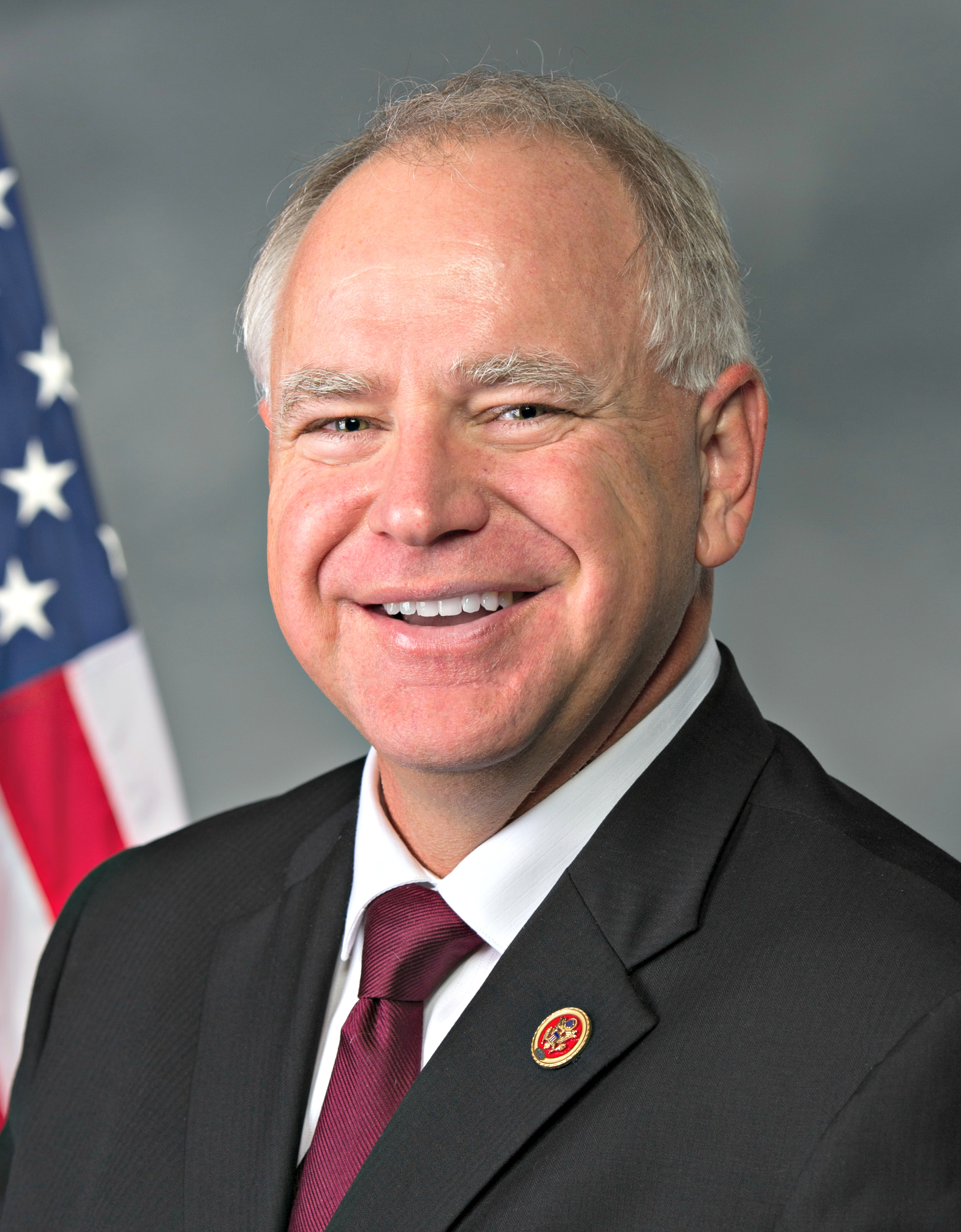
Governor Tim Walz

The executive branch is led by Minnesota's governor, currently Tim Walz, a DFLer who took office on January 7, 2019. Walz was also Kamala Harris's running mate in the 2024 United States presidential election. As chief executive, the governor appoints the heads of state agencies and is responsible for faithful execution of the law. As commander-in-chief of the state's armed forces, the governor also has command and control over the Minnesota National Guard. A cabinet consisting of the lieutenant governor and the heads of Minnesota's 22 state agencies consults and assists the governor in the business of state government.

Aside from the governor and lieutenant governor, who are elected on a joint ticket, Minnesotans separately elect three other constitutional officers: a secretary of state, an attorney general, and a state auditor. (Note: The secretary of state is custodian of state records and the state seal, registers businesses, and administers elections. The secretary of state also processes notary public applications and administers Minnesota's address confidentiality program for victims of crime, among other responsibilities.) (Note: The attorney general is the chief law officer for the state of Minnesota, representing state agencies in legal proceedings and issuing written opinions on questions of law. As chief law officer, the attorney general also enforces state consumer protection and antitrust laws, regulates charities, and advocates for people and small businesses in utilities matters, among other responsibilities.) (Note: The state auditor supervises and audits the finances of Minnesota's approximately 5,500 local governments, which altogether spend over $40 billion annually. The state auditor also performs under contract the annual single audit of federal programs administered by state agencies and their subrecipients. Public expenditures overseen by the state auditor thus exceed standalone state spending by 15.3 percent.) These five "executive officers" together constitute the Executive Council, which has certain statutory responsibilities in matters of state finance, emergency management, and public lands administration.

Constitutional officeholders:

- Governor Tim Walz (DFL)
- Lt. Governor Peggy Flanagan (DFL)
- Secretary of State Steve Simon (DFL)
- Attorney General Keith Ellison (DFL)
- State Auditor Julie Blaha (DFL)

=== Legislature ===
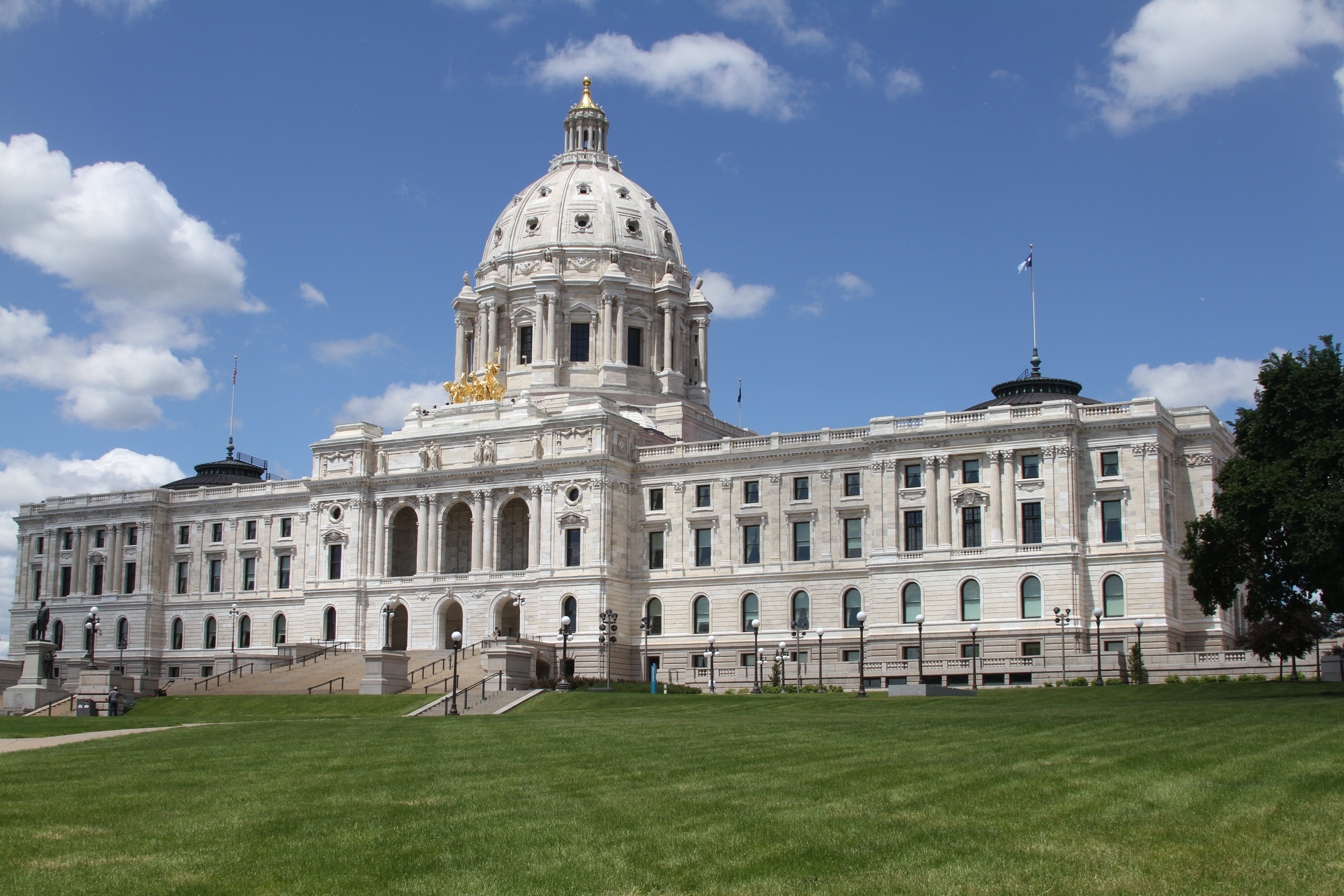
The Minnesota State Capitol in Saint Paul, designed by Cass Gilbert

The Minnesota Legislature is a bicameral body consisting of the Minnesota Senate and the Minnesota House of Representatives. The state has 67 legislative districts, each with about 85,000 people. Each district has one senator and two representatives, with each senatorial district divided into A and B sections for members of the House. Representatives serve two-year terms, and senators are up for election every four years and in the first state election after a census.

After the 2022 state elections, both the House and Senate had a slim DFL majority. Since the 2024 Minnesota House of Representatives election, the House has had 67 DFLers and 67 Republicans.

=== Judiciary ===
Minnesota's court system has three levels. Most cases start in the district courts, which are courts of general jurisdiction. There are 279 district court judgeships in ten judicial districts. Appeals from the trial courts and challenges to certain governmental decisions are heard by the Minnesota Court of Appeals, consisting of 19 judges who typically sit in three-judge panels. The seven-justice Minnesota Supreme Court hears all appeals from the tax court, the workers' compensation court of appeals, first-degree murder convictions, and discretionary appeals from the court of appeals; it also has original jurisdiction over election disputes.

Two specialized courts within administrative agencies have been established: the workers' compensation court of appeals, and the tax court, which deals with non-criminal tax cases.

Supreme Court Justices

- Chief Justice Theodora Gaïtas

Associate Justices

- Anne McKeig
- Paul Thissen
- Gordon Moore
- Karl Procaccini
- Sarah Hennesy
- Theodora Gaïtas

=== Regional ===
In addition to the city and county levels of government found in the United States, Minnesota has other entities that provide governmental oversight and planning. Regional development commissions (RDCs) provide technical assistance to local governments in the broad multi-county areas of the state. Along with this Metropolitan Planning Organizations (MPOs), such as the Metropolitan Council, provide planning and oversight of land use actions in metropolitan areas. Many lakes and rivers are overseen by watershed districts and soil and water conservation districts.

=== Federal ===
Minnesota's United States senators are Democrats Amy Klobuchar and Tina Smith. The state has eight congressional districts; they are represented by Brad Finstad (1st district; R), Angie Craig (2nd; DFL), Kelly Morrison (3rd; DFL), Betty McCollum (4th; DFL), Ilhan Omar (5th; DFL), Tom Emmer (6th; R), Michelle Fischbach (7th; R), and Pete Stauber (8th; R).

Federal court cases are heard in the United States District Court for the District of Minnesota, in Minneapolis, St. Paul, Duluth, and Fergus Falls. Appeals are heard by the Eighth Circuit Court of Appeals in St. Louis, Missouri and St. Paul.

=== Tribal ===
The State of Minnesota was created by the United States federal government in the traditional and cultural range of lands occupied by the Dakota and Anishinaabe peoples as well as other Native American groups. After many years of unequal treaties and forced resettlement by the state and federal government, the tribes re-organized into sovereign tribal governments. Today, the tribal governments are divided into 11 semi-autonomous reservations that negotiate with the U.S. and the state on a bilateral basis:

Four Dakota Mdewakanton communities:

- Prairie Island Indian Community
- Shakopee Mdewakanton Sioux Community
- Lower Sioux Indian Reservation
- Upper Sioux Community – Pejuhutazizi Oyate

Seven Anishinaabe reservations:

- Bois Forte Band of Chippewa
- Fond du Lac Band of Lake Superior Chippewa
- Grand Portage Band of Chippewa
- Leech Lake Band of Ojibwe
- Mille Lacs Band of Ojibwe
- White Earth Band of Ojibwe
- Red Lake Band of Chippewa

The first six of the Anishinaabe bands compose the Minnesota Chippewa Tribe, the collective federally recognized tribal government of the Bois Forte, Fond du Lac, Grand Portage, Leech Lake, Mille Lacs, and White Earth reservations.

== Politics ==
United States presidential election results for Minnesota
Year	Republican		Democratic		Third party(ies)	
Year	No.	%	No.	%	No.	%
1860	22,069	63.53%	11,920	34.31%	748	2.15%
1864	25,055	59.06%	17,367	40.94%	0	0.00%
1868	43,722	60.88%	28,096	39.12%	0	0.00%
1872	55,708	61.27%	35,211	38.73%	0	0.00%
1876	72,955	58.80%	48,587	39.16%	2,533	2.04%
1880	93,902	62.28%	53,315	35.36%	3,553	2.36%
1884	111,685	58.78%	70,065	36.87%	8,267	4.35%
1888	142,492	54.12%	104,385	39.65%	16,408	6.23%
1892	122,823	45.96%	100,920	37.76%	43,495	16.28%
1896	193,503	56.62%	139,735	40.89%	8,524	2.49%
1900	190,461	60.21%	112,901	35.69%	12,949	4.09%
1904	216,651	73.98%	55,187	18.84%	21,022	7.18%
1908	195,843	59.11%	109,401	33.02%	26,060	7.87%
1912	64,334	19.25%	106,426	31.84%	163,459	48.91%
1916	179,544	46.35%	179,152	46.25%	28,668	7.40%
1920	519,421	70.59%	142,994	19.43%	73,423	9.98%
1924	420,759	51.18%	55,913	6.80%	345,474	42.02%
1928	560,977	57.77%	396,451	40.83%	13,548	1.40%
1932	363,959	36.29%	600,806	59.91%	38,078	3.80%
1936	350,461	31.01%	698,811	61.84%	80,703	7.14%
1940	596,274	47.66%	644,196	51.49%	10,718	0.86%
1944	527,416	46.86%	589,864	52.41%	8,249	0.73%
1948	483,617	39.89%	692,966	57.16%	35,643	2.94%
1952	763,211	55.33%	608,458	44.11%	7,814	0.57%
1956	719,302	53.68%	617,525	46.08%	3,178	0.24%
1960	757,915	49.16%	779,933	50.58%	4,039	0.26%
1964	559,624	36.00%	991,117	63.76%	3,721	0.24%
1968	658,643	41.46%	857,738	54.00%	72,129	4.54%
1972	898,269	51.58%	802,346	46.07%	41,037	2.36%
1976	819,395	42.02%	1,070,440	54.90%	60,096	3.08%
1980	873,241	42.56%	954,174	46.50%	224,538	10.94%
1984	1,032,603	49.54%	1,036,364	49.72%	15,482	0.74%
1988	962,337	45.90%	1,109,471	52.91%	24,982	1.19%
1992	747,841	31.85%	1,020,997	43.48%	579,110	24.66%
1996	766,476	34.96%	1,120,438	51.10%	305,726	13.94%
2000	1,109,659	45.50%	1,168,266	47.91%	160,760	6.59%
2004	1,346,695	47.61%	1,445,014	51.09%	36,678	1.30%
2008	1,275,409	43.82%	1,573,354	54.06%	61,606	2.12%
2012	1,320,225	44.96%	1,546,167	52.65%	70,169	2.39%
2016	1,323,232	44.93%	1,367,825	46.44%	254,176	8.63%
2020	1,484,065	45.28%	1,717,077	52.40%	76,029	2.32%
2024	1,519,032	46.68%	1,656,979	50.92%	77,909	2.39%

Minnesota is known for a politically active citizenry, and populism has been a long-standing force among the state's political parties. Minnesota has a consistently high voter turnout. In the 2008 U.S. presidential election, 78.2% of eligible Minnesotans voted – the highest percentage of any U.S. state – versus the national average of 61.2%. That figure was surpassed in 2020, when 79.96% of registered voters participated in the general election. Voters can register on election day at their polling places with evidence of residency.

Hubert Humphrey brought national attention to the state with his address at the 1948 Democratic National Convention. Minnesotans have consistently cast their Electoral College votes for Democratic presidential candidates since 1976, longer than any other state. Minnesota is the only state in the nation that did not vote for Ronald Reagan in either of his presidential campaigns. Minnesota has voted for the Democratic nominee in all but one presidential election since 1960 (Republican Richard Nixon won Minnesota in 1972).

Both the Democratic and Republican parties have major-party status in Minnesota, but its state-level Democratic party has a different name, officially known as the Minnesota Democratic–Farmer–Labor Party (DFL). It was formed out of a 1944 alliance of the Minnesota Democratic and Farmer–Labor parties.

The state has had active third-party movements. The Reform Party, now the Independence Party, was able to elect former mayor of Brooklyn Park and professional wrestler Jesse Ventura to the governorship in 1998. The Independence Party has received enough support to keep major-party status. The Green Party, while no longer having major-party status, has a large presence in municipal government, notably in Minneapolis and Duluth, where it competes directly with the DFL party for local offices. Major-party status in Minnesota (which grants state funding for elections) is reserved for parties whose candidates receive five percent or more of the vote in any statewide election (e.g., governor, secretary of state, U.S. president).

The state's U.S. Senate seats was split in the early 1990s and in the 108th and 109th Congresses, Minnesota's congressional delegation was split, with four representatives and one senator from each party. In the 2006 mid-term election, Democrats were elected to all state offices, except governor and lieutenant governor, where Republicans Tim Pawlenty and Carol Molnau narrowly won reelection.

The DFL posted double-digit gains in both houses of the legislature, elected Amy Klobuchar to the U.S. Senate, and increased the party's U.S. House caucus by one. Keith Ellison was the first African American U.S. representative elected from Minnesota and the first Muslim elected to Congress nationwide. In 2008, DFLer and former comedian and radio talk show host Al Franken defeated incumbent Republican Norm Coleman in the U.S. Senate race by 312 votes out of three million cast.

In the 2010 election, Republicans took control of both chambers of the Minnesota legislature for the first time in 38 years and, with Mark Dayton's election, the DFL party took the governor's office for the first time in 20 years. Two years later, the DFL regained control of both houses, and with Dayton in office, the party had same-party control of both the legislative and executive branches for the first time since 1990. Two years later, the Republicans regained control of the Minnesota House, and in 2016, the GOP also regained control of the State Senate.

In 2018, the DFL retook control of the Minnesota House, while electing DFLer Tim Walz as Governor.

In a 2020 study, Minnesota was ranked as the 15th easiest state for citizens to vote in.

== Media ==
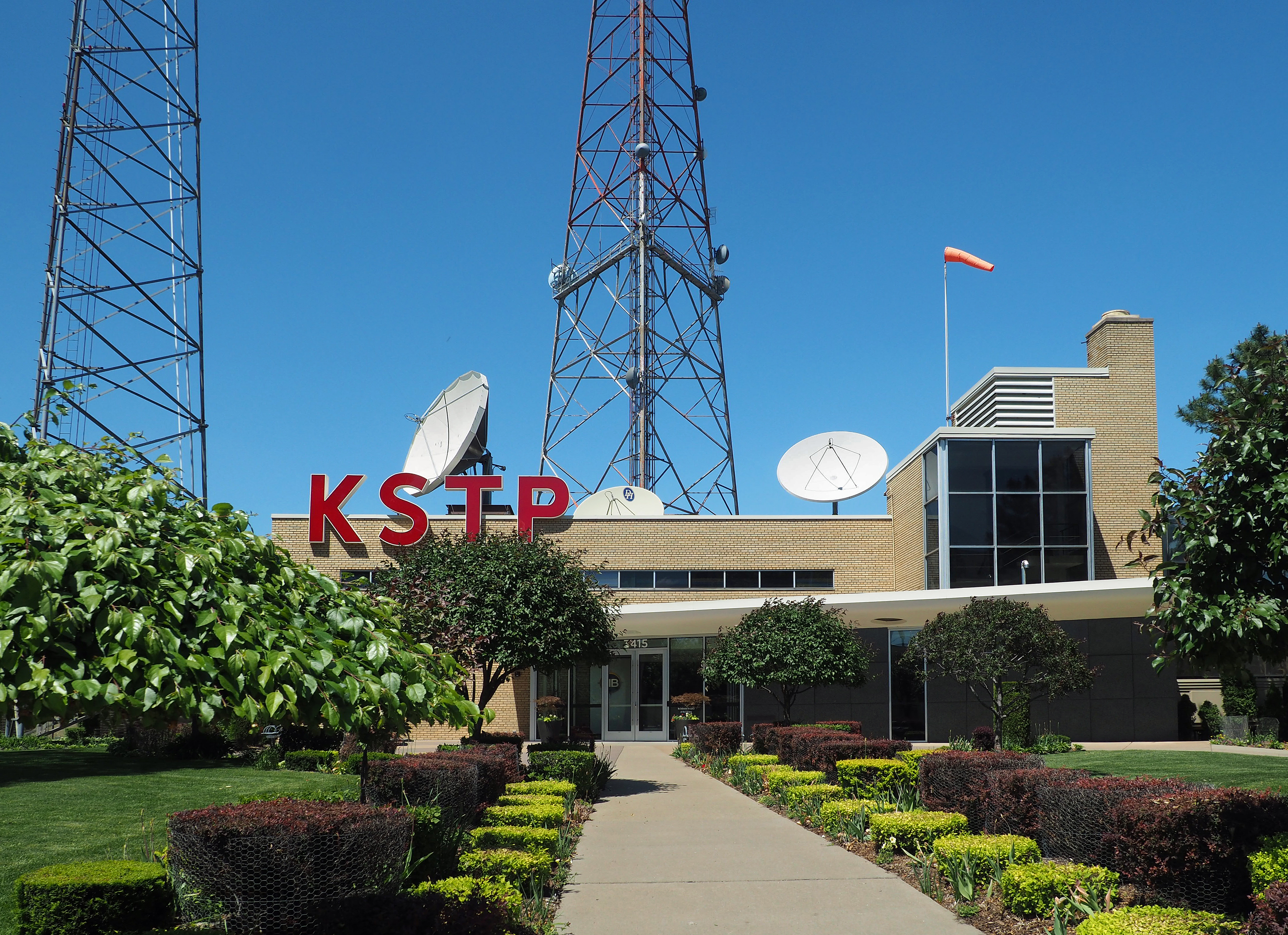
KSTP studios

The Twin Cities area is the fifteenth largest media market in the United States, as ranked by Nielsen Media Research. The state's other top markets are Fargo–Moorhead (118th nationally), Duluth–Superior (137th), Rochester–Mason City–Austin (152nd), and Mankato (200th).

Broadcast television in Minnesota and the Upper Midwest started on April 27, 1948, when KSTP-TV began broadcasting. Hubbard Broadcasting, which owns KSTP, is now the only locally owned television company in Minnesota. Twin Cities CBS station WCCO-TV and FOX station KMSP-TV are owned-and-operated by their respective networks. There are 39 analog broadcast stations and 23 digital channels broadcast over Minnesota.

The four largest daily newspapers are the Star Tribune in Minneapolis, the Pioneer Press in Saint Paul, the Duluth News Tribune in Duluth, and the Post-Bulletin in Rochester. The Minnesota Daily is the largest student-run newspaper in the U.S. Sites offering daily news on the Web include The UpTake, MinnPost, the Twin Cities Daily Planet, business news site Finance and Commerce and Washington D.C.–based Minnesota Independent. Weekly and monthly publications such as Minnesota Monthly are available.

Two of the largest public radio networks, Minnesota Public Radio (MPR) and Public Radio International (PRI), are based in the state. MPR has the largest audience of any regional public radio network in the nation, broadcasting on 46 radio stations as of 2019. PRI weekly provides more than 400 hours of programming to almost 800 affiliates. The state's oldest radio station, KUOM-AM, was launched in 1922 and is among the 10-oldest radio stations in the United States. The University of Minnesota-owned station is still on the air, and since 1993 broadcasts a college rock format.

== Sports, recreation and tourism ==
Minnesota has an active program of organized amateur and professional sports. Tourism has become an important industry, especially in the Lake region. In the North Country, what had been an industrial area focused on mining and timber has largely been transformed into a vacation destination. Popular interest in the environment and environmentalism, added to traditional interests in hunting and fishing, has attracted a large urban audience within driving range.

=== Organized sports ===
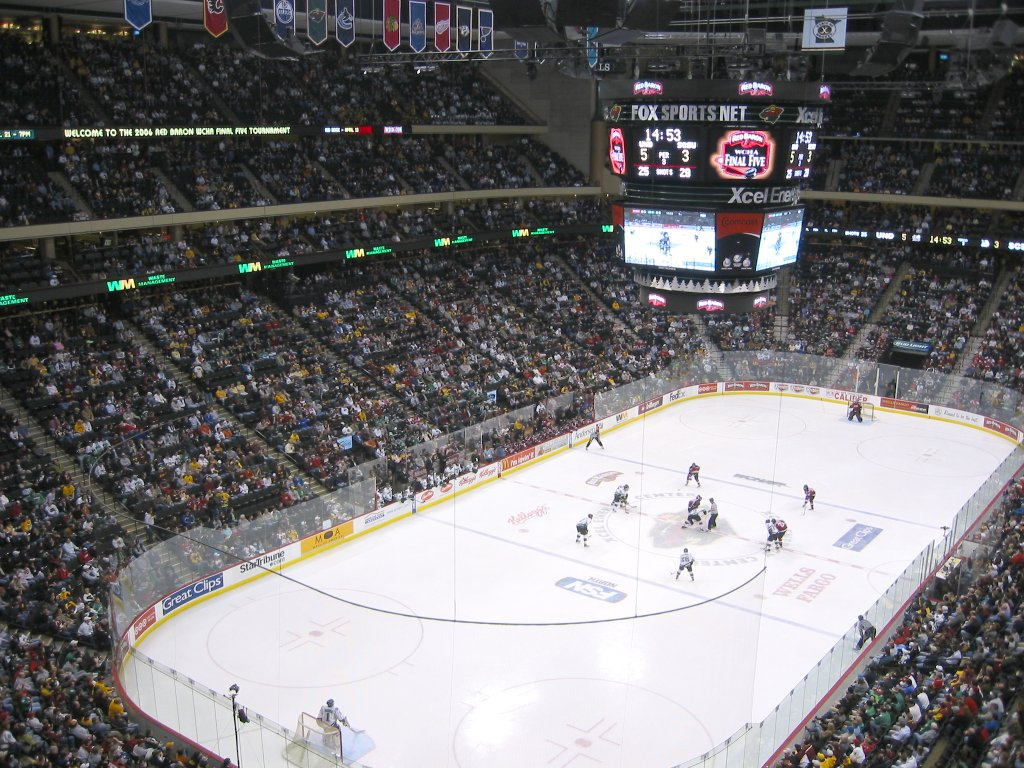
The University of North Dakota and St. Cloud State University during the WCHA Final Five at the Grand Casino Arena.

Minnesota has professional men's teams in all major sports.

The Minnesota Vikings, an American football team based in Minneapolis, have played in the National Football League since their admission as an expansion franchise in 1961. They played in Metropolitan Stadium from 1961 through 1981 and in the Hubert H. Humphrey Metrodome from 1982 until its demolition after the 2013 season for the construction of the team's new and current home, U.S. Bank Stadium. This stadium hosted Super Bowl LII in February 2018. Super Bowl XXVI was played in the Metrodome in 1992. The Vikings have advanced to the Super Bowl Super Bowl IV, Super Bowl VIII, Super Bowl IX, and Super Bowl XI, losing all four games to their AFC/AFL opponent.

The Minnesota Twins have played in the Major League Baseball in the Twin Cities since 1961. The Twins began play as the original Washington Senators, a founding member of the American League in 1901, relocating to Minnesota in 1961. The Twins won the 1987 and 1991 World Series in seven-game matches where the home team was victorious in all games. The Twins also advanced to the 1965 World Series, where they lost to the Los Angeles Dodgers in seven games. The team has played at Target Field since 2010.

The Minneapolis Lakers of the National Basketball Association played in the Minneapolis Auditorium from 1947 to 1960, after which they relocated to Los Angeles. The Minnesota Timberwolves joined the NBA in 1989, and have played in Target Center since 1990.

The National Hockey League's Minnesota Wild play in St. Paul's Grand Casino Arena, and reached 300 consecutive sold-out games on January 16, 2008. Previously, the Minnesota North Stars competed in the NHL from 1967 to 1993, which played in and lost the 1981 and 1991 Stanley Cup Finals.

Minnesota United FC joined Major League Soccer as an expansion team in 2017, having played in the lower-division North American Soccer League from 2010 to 2016. The team plays at Allianz Field in St. Paul. Previous professional soccer teams have included the Minnesota Kicks, which played at Metropolitan Stadium from 1976 to 1981, and the Minnesota Strikers from 1984 to 1988.

Minnesota also has minor-league professional sports teams. The Minnesota Swarm of the National Lacrosse League played at the Xcel Energy Center until the team moved to Georgia in 2015. The St. Paul Saints, who play at CHS Field in St. Paul, are the Triple-A minor league affiliate of the Minnesota Twins.

Professional women's sports include the Minnesota Lynx of the Women's National Basketball Association, winners of the 2011, 2013, 2015, and 2017 WNBA Championships, Minnesota Aurora FC of the United Soccer League W-League, the Minnesota Vixen of the Independent Women's Football League, the Minnesota Valkyrie of the Legends Football League, the Minnesota Frost of the Professional Women's Hockey League, and the Minnesota Whitecaps of the National Women's Hockey League.

The Twin Cities campus of the University of Minnesota is a National Collegiate Athletic Association (NCAA) Division I school competing in the Big Ten Conference. Four additional schools in the state compete in NCAA Division I ice hockey: the University of Minnesota Duluth; Minnesota State University, Mankato; St. Cloud State University and Bemidji State University. There are nine NCAA Division II colleges in the Northern Sun Intercollegiate Conference, and twenty NCAA Division III colleges in the Minnesota Intercollegiate Athletic Conference and Upper Midwest Athletic Conference.

Minneapolis has hosted the NCAA Men's Division I Basketball Championship in 1951, 1992, 2001, and 2019.

The Hazeltine National Golf Club has hosted the U.S. Open, U.S. Women's Open, U.S. Senior Open and PGA Championship. The course also hosted the Ryder Cup in the fall of 2016, when it became one of two courses in the U.S. to host all major golf competitions. The Ryder Cup is scheduled to return in 2028.

Interlachen Country Club has hosted the U.S. Open, U.S. Women's Open, and Solheim Cup.

Winter Olympic Games medalists from the state include twelve of the twenty members of the gold medal 1980 ice hockey team (coached by Minnesota native Herb Brooks) and the bronze medalist U.S. men's curling team in the 2006 Winter Olympics, as well as the gold medal-winning team from Duluth at the 2018 Winter Olympics. Swimmer Tom Malchow won an Olympic gold medal in the 2000 Summer games and a silver medal in 1996.

Grandma's Marathon is run every summer along the scenic North Shore of Lake Superior, and the Twin Cities Marathon winds around lakes and the Mississippi River during the peak of the fall color season. Farther north, Eveleth is the location of the United States Hockey Hall of Fame.

=== Outdoor recreation ===
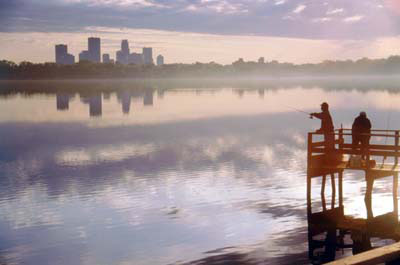
Fishing on Bde Maka Ska in Minneapolis

Minnesotans participate in high levels of physical activity, and many of these activities are outdoors. The strong interest of Minnesotans in environmentalism has been attributed to the popularity of these pursuits.

In the warmer months, these activities often involve water. Weekend and longer trips to family cabins on Minnesota's numerous lakes are a way of life for many residents. Activities include water sports such as water skiing, which originated in the state, boating, canoeing, and fishing. More than 36% of Minnesotans fish, second only to Alaska.

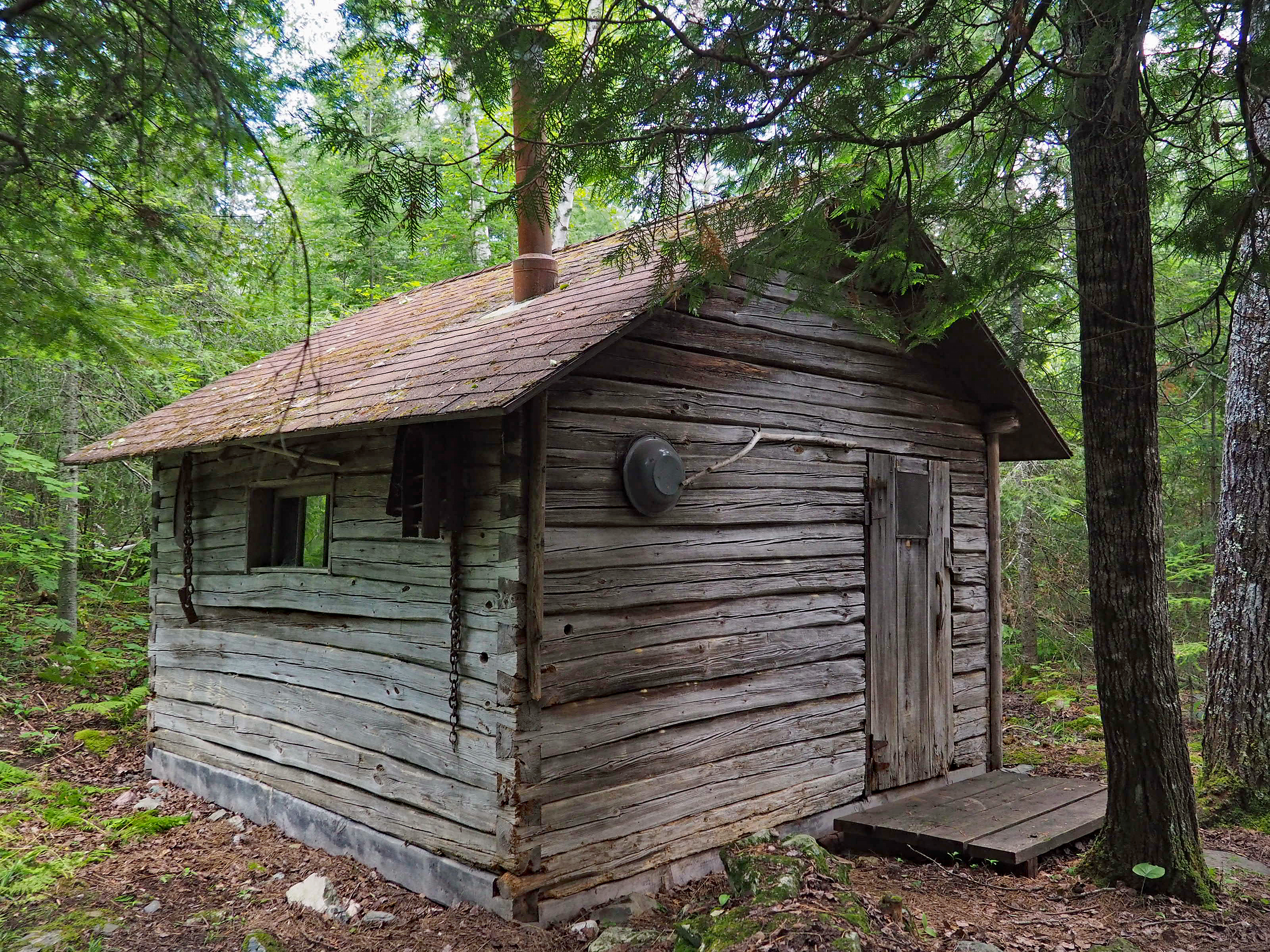
An old sauna cabin of Listening Point on the shores of Burntside Lake in Morse Township, Minnesota

Fishing does not cease when the lakes freeze; ice fishing has been around since the first Scandinavian immigrants arrived. During the long, harsh winters, Minnesotans play ice sports such as skating, hockey, curling, and broomball, and snow sports such as cross-country skiing, alpine skiing, luge, snowshoeing, and snowmobiling. Minnesota is the only U.S. state where bandy is played.

State and national forests and the 72 state parks are used year-round for hunting, camping, and hiking. There are almost 20,000 miles (32,000 km) of snowmobile trails statewide. Minnesota has more miles of bike trails than any other state, and a growing network of hiking trails, including the 235-mile (378 km) Superior Hiking Trail in the northeast. Many hiking and bike trails are used for cross-country skiing during the winter.

== See also ==
- Index of Minnesota-related articles
- Outline of Minnesota

== Notes ==
Preceded by California	List of U.S. states by date of statehood Admitted on May 11, 1858 (32nd)	Succeeded by Oregon
