= Hispanics and Latinos in Minnesota =

Residents of the U.S. state of Minnesota who are of Hispanic or Latino origin

Hispanic and Latino Minnesotans are residents of the U.S. state of Minnesota who are of Hispanic or Latino origin. In the 2020 census, 345,640 Minnesotans reported Hispanic or Latino origin, or 6.1 percent of the state's population. After White and Black residents, they are the state's third-largest population group. The Census Bureau's 2025 estimate puts the Hispanic or Latino share at 7.2 percent.

Mexican and Tejano workers first came to Minnesota in large numbers in the early twentieth century to work in the sugar beet fields, and some settled in St. Paul and Minneapolis. The population grew slowly until the 1990s, when jobs in meat and poultry processing, manufacturing, construction and services drew new arrivals to the Twin Cities and to towns in the southern and western parts of the state. As of 2021, about 70 percent of Latino Minnesotans were born in the United States.

Latino Minnesotans have faced immigration enforcement at several points in the state's history, including repatriation drives in the 1930s, a 2006 raid at a Worthington meatpacking plant, and Operation Metro Surge, a federal enforcement operation in the Twin Cities area that began around the start of December 2025.

== Demographics ==
The Latino population of Minnesota grew from 143,382 in 2000 (2.9 percent of the state) to 248,297 in 2010 (4.7 percent) and 345,640 in 2020 (6.1 percent). During the 2010s the state's total population grew 7.6 percent while its Hispanic or Latino population grew 38 percent, which made up nearly a quarter of the state's population growth in that decade. State demographer Susan Brower said that Latinos had the largest undercount of any group in the 2020 census. The Star Tribune reported that many Latinos felt vulnerable because of a late-added citizenship question that the U.S. Supreme Court ordered removed. A 2023 American Community Survey estimate put the population at about 367,000 (6.4 percent), and the Minnesota Council on Latino Affairs projects 551,600 residents by 2035.

About 200,000 Latino Minnesotans, or three in five, are of Mexican origin. An analysis of 2020 census responses by the Star Tribune, which counts people who also listed other groups, found about 214,000 people of Mexican descent in the state, and that this group grew by more than 38,400 from 2010 to 2020, more than any other Latino group. The next largest origin groups in 2021 were Ecuadorians (19,600), Puerto Ricans (14,300), people of Spanish origin (13,900), Salvadorans (12,400) and Guatemalans (12,200). Colombians, Cubans, Hondurans and Dominicans each numbered fewer than 8,000.

The Twin Cities metropolitan area had 242,621 Latino residents in 2020. Outside the metro area, the highest shares were in the southwest and south: the Worthington area was 32.6 percent Latino, and Nobles County and Watonwan County each had a Latino share above 25 percent. The Willmar area was 13.5 percent Latino, the Austin area 12.7 percent, the Albert Lea area 10.3 percent and the Faribault-Northfield area 10.1 percent.

The Latino population is much younger than the state as a whole. In 2021 the median age was 26.2 years, compared with 38.8 statewide, and in 2020 about 37 percent of Latino Minnesotans were under 18, compared with 23 percent of all Minnesotans. About 78 percent are U.S. citizens. Among residents aged five and older, 58 percent speak Spanish at home and 86 percent speak English well or very well.
