= John E. Simonett =

American judge

The Honorable John E. Simonett

United States Senator from Minnesota Supreme Court
- In office 1980–1994
- Preceded by: Walter F. Rogosheske
- Succeeded by: Paul H. Anderson

Personal details
- Born: July 12, 1924 Le Center, Minnesota
- Died: July 28, 2011 (aged 87)

John E. Simonett (July 12, 1924 – July 28, 2011) was an attorney and associate justice of the Minnesota Supreme Court. He was famous for his wit and thoughtfulness, characteristics reflected both in his judicial opinions, and in his writings and speeches. In 2007, he was named one of the 100 most influential attorneys in Minnesota history. Of his six daughters and sons, two became judges, one serving as the fourth Chief Judge of the Minnesota Court of Appeals from 1994 to 1995.

== Background ==
Simonett was born to Edward and Veronica Simonett on July 12, 1924, in Mankato, Minnesota, and was raised in nearby Le Center. He attended St. John's University in Collegeville, Minnesota, but his studies were interrupted by World War II. After three years in the U.S. Army, he was ordered to the Philippines as an infantry lieutenant just as the war was coming to a close. Upon his discharge, he returned to St. John's, graduating with a bachelor's degree in 1948. He entered the University of Minnesota Law School, where he graduated as one of the top students in his class in 1951 after serving as the president of the Minnesota Law Review. He then entered private practice in Little Falls, Minnesota, with Gordon Rosenmeier. Rosenmeier was already a well-respected state senator and attorney, and Simonett soon became a well-respected trial attorney. He also became known as a colorful commentator on the law and culture, through articles such as "The Common Law of Morrison County" in 1963, which recited myths about legal rights and duties in small-town America. He also took on more serious and complex topics, writing an influential law review article in 1977 on the use of partial settlements of multi-defendant civil suits. In 1980, when Little Falls native Walter F. Rogosheske retired from the Minnesota Supreme Court, Governor Al Quie appointed Simonett to fill the vacancy.

== Associate Justice, Minnesota Supreme Court (1980–1994) ==
In over thirteen years on the bench, Justice Simonett wrote 423 opinions, 355 of them on behalf of a majority of the justices. "Simonett, a moderate, wrote decisions upholding the state's fetal homicide law, overturning lower welfare benefits for new state residents and, in one controversial case, allowing a lawyer to eliminate a potential juror based on religion." Looking back on Simonett's opinions at the time of his retirement, Robert Stein (then the dean of the University of Minnesota Law School) commented that his decisions cannot readily be classified as conservative. "Rather, they seem to be very thoughtful, well-researched expositions of how prior law would apply to the case before him." In Cohen v. Cowles Media Co., his opinion for the Court reversing (on First Amendment grounds) a jury verdict against a media company whose editorial staff broke a promise of confidentiality was reversed by the U.S. Supreme Court.

== Retirement from the bench ==
In Minnesota, judges are required to retire from active service before their 70th birthday. Upon Simonett's mandatory retirement from the Supreme Court in 1994, Governor Arne Carlson appointed Paul H. Anderson, then Chief Judge of the Minnesota Court of Appeals, to take Simonett's place, and chose one of Simonett's daughters, Hennepin County District Court Judge Anne Simonett, to succeed Anderson as Chief Judge of the Court of Appeals. Anne Simonett's service was cut short by a brain tumor that proved fatal the following year. Another of his daughters, Martha Simonett, was later appointed to fill a District Court vacancy in Dakota County.

Upon his retirement from the bench, he practiced law in Minneapolis at the law firm of Greene Espel PLLP until 2007, and taught appellate practice at the University of Minnesota. He resided in St. Paul with his wife Doris, the former Doris Margaret Bogut.

The chapter of the American Inns of Court in the area of Central Minnesota in which he practiced law for 29 years is named the John Simonett American Inn of Court.

== Death ==
On July 28, 2011, Simonett died at the age of 87.

== Major articles ==
- "The Common Law of Morrison County," 49 A.B.A. Journal 263 (Mar. 1963)
- "The Trial as One of the Performing Arts," 52 A.B.A. Journal 1145 (Dec. 1966)
- "The Footnote as Excursion and Diversion," 55 A.B.A. Journal 1141 (Dec. 1969)
- "Release of Joint Tortfeasors: Use of the Pierringer Release in Minnesota," 3 Wm. Mitchell L. Rev. 1 (1977)
- "Meditation on the Limits of Law," 2 J. of Law & Religion 1 (1984)
- "Forensic Rhetoric and Irving Younger," 73 Minn. L. Rev. 865 (1989)
- "The Growing Irrelevance of Relevance," 49 Bench & Bar of Minnesota 11 (Aug. 1992)
- "Rules for Practice in General," 51 Bench & Bar of Minnesota 30 (Jul. 1994)
- "The Use of 'Result-Oriented' to Characterize Appellate Decisions," 10 Wm. Mitchell L. Rev. 187 (1984)
- "Essay: A Corporation Soul," 54 Bench & Bar of Minnesota 34 (Sept. 1997)
- "Rules of Statutory Construction and Florida Election Law," 58 Bench & Bar of Minnesota 51 (July 2001)
- "Civility and 'Generalized Reciprocity'," 60 Bench & Bar of Minnesota 27 (Feb. 2003)
