= Theatre of the Relatively Talentless =

Student theatrical company in Minnesota

The Theatre of the Relatively Talentless (TORT) is a student theatrical company that puts on musicals and other performances written, produced, directed and performed by law students of the University of Minnesota Law School. TORT is a campus life program through the University of Minnesota Student Activities Office and operates under the purview of the Law School. Formed in 2002, it "provides law students and faculty with a desperately needed creative outlet."

== Membership ==
TORT is open to all law students at the university wanting to join. TORT is governed year-round by an executive board consisting of two producers, a director, a music director, a technical director, a head writer, a treasurer, a head costumer, and a choreographer. As TORT has become more established, the cast has grown to more than 70 members. Participants are often known as the TORTfeasors.

== Musical ==
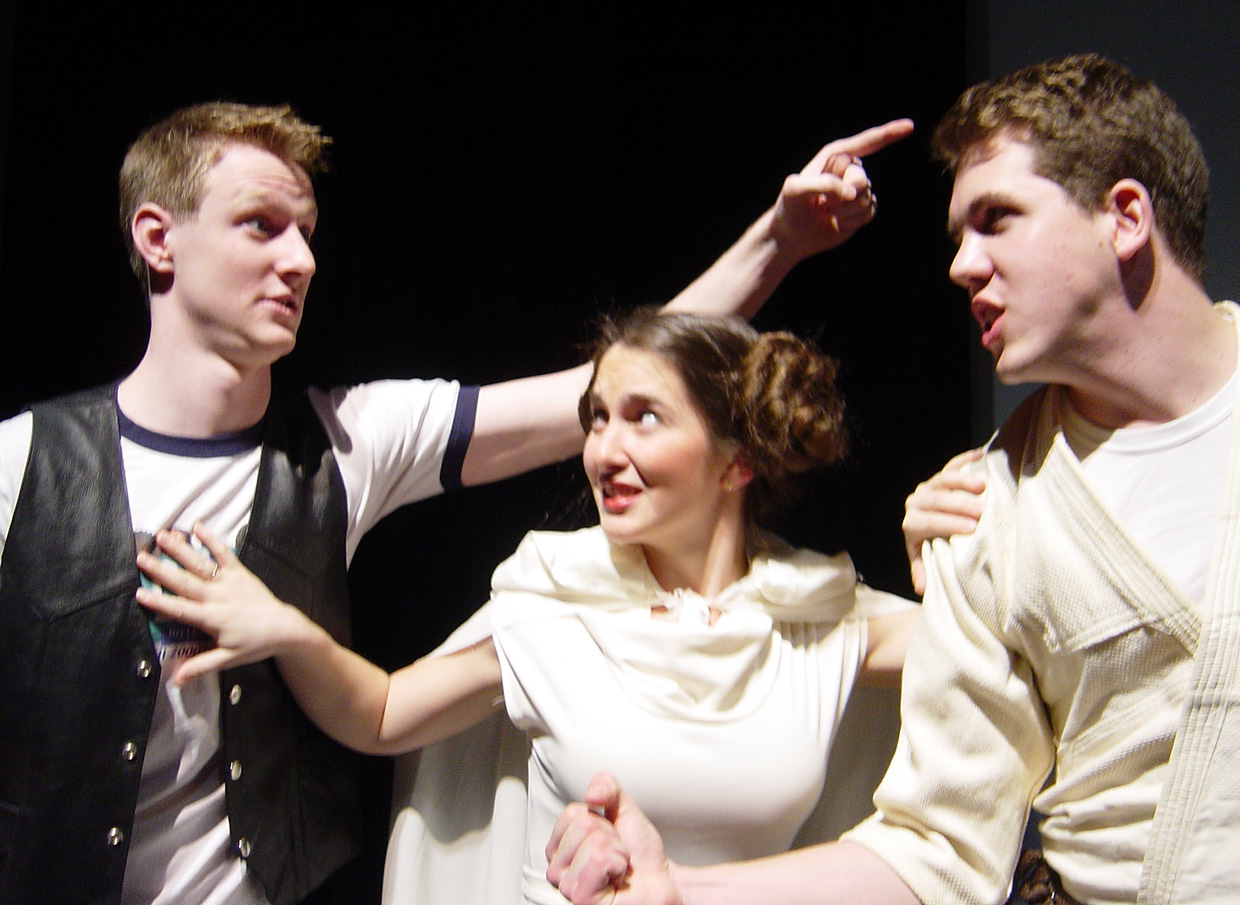
Scene from T.O.R.T.'s 2004 production of Law Wars.

The musical is an annual event held in late March or early April of each year. The event draws over a thousand audience members each year. The show is notable for its cameos by law school professors, deans, staff, alumni and other distinguished members of the Minnesota legal community.

The theme is chosen shortly after the previous year's show, and a draft of the script is completed over the summer. Auditions are held during the fall semester, and rehearsals begin at the start of the spring semester.

Cast members may be assigned as leads, featured singers, featured dancers, or members of the chorus. Chorus members may also have speaking lines, and often impersonate law school professors, staff, or administrators. TORT has its own pit orchestra, also composed entirely of law students, which provides musical accompaniment for the show.

Executive Board members for the following year are elected on the night of each final performance.

== Past shows ==
- 2003: Wizard of Fritz – a spoof on The Wizard of Oz, performed in the Open Book Loft in Minneapolis, Minnesota.
- 2004: Law Wars – a spoof on Star Wars, performed in the Coffman Memorial Union Theatre on the Minneapolis campus of the University of Minnesota.
- 2005: Walter Wonka & the Lawyer Factory – a spoof on Willy Wonka & the Chocolate Factory, performed in the St. Paul Student Center Theatre on the St. Paul campus of the University of Minnesota.
- 2006: West Bank Story – a spoof on West Side Story, performed in the St. Paul Student Center Theatre at the University of Minnesota.
- 2007: Frankenlaw – a spoof on Frankenstein, performed in the Pantages Theatre in downtown Minneapolis.
- 2008: Robin Hood, Esq. – a spoof on Robin Hood, performed in the Pantages Theatre.
- 2009: It's A Wonderful Law School – a spoof on It's a Wonderful Life, performed in the Pantages Theatre.
- 2010: A Midsemester Night's Dream – a spoof on A Midsummer Night's Dream, performed in the Pantages Theatre.
- 2011: Harry Torter and the Magical Law School – a spoof on Harry Potter, performed in the Pantages Theatre.
- 2012: Alawddin: The Tale of 1,001 All-Nighters – a spoof on Aladdin, performed in the Pantages Theatre.
- 2013: Back to the Future Interest – a spoof on Back to the Future, performed in the Pantages Theatre.
- 2014: Clue: a Murder Mystery in Mondale – a spoof on Clue (film), performed in the Pantages Theatre.
- 2015: Froze-in – a spoof on Frozen (film), performed in the Pantages Theatre.
- 2016: Minnesota Jones and the Law School of Doom – a spoof on Indiana Jones and the Temple of Doom, performed in the Pantages Theatre.
- 2017: The TORT Producers – a spoof on The Producers (musical), performed in the Ted Mann Concert Hall.
- 2018: Top Gunner – a spoof on Top Gun, performed in the Ted Mann Concert Hall.
- 2019: Tale as Old as Time - a spoof on Beauty and the Beast, performed in the Pantages Theater.
- 2020: ~~Lord of the Ranks~~, tragically cancelled due to some kind of worldwide pandemic or something.
- 2021: Super Smash Gophers, performed via online simulcast and drive-in experience at Graco Park.
- 2022: Gunner's New Groove, a spoof on The Emperor's New Groove performed in the St. Paul Student Center Theatre at the University of Minnesota.
- 2023: Tortanic, a spoof on Titanic (1997 film), performed in the Ted Mann Concert Hall at the University of Minnesota.
- 2024: Moot Cars, a spoof on Cars (film), performed in the Ted Mann Concert Hall at the University of Minnesota.
- 2025: Night at the Law School, inspired by Night at the Museum, performed in the Ted Mann Concert Hall at the University of Minnesota.
- 2026: Moot Girls, inspired by Mean Girls, performed in the Ted Mann Concert Hall at the University of Minnesota.

== Cameos ==
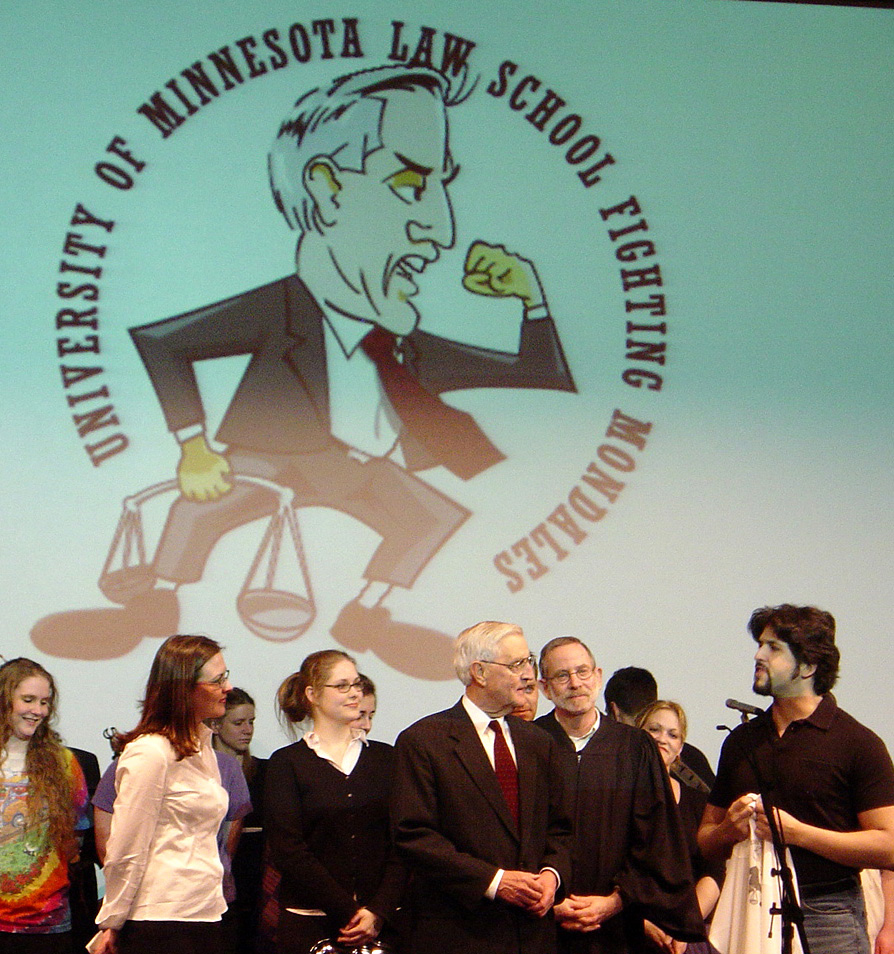
Walter Mondale at the introduction of the "Fighting Mondales" following the 2004 production of Law Wars.

=== 2003 ===
VIP

- Former vice president Walter Mondale ('56)
- Minnesota Supreme Court Associate Justice Paul H. Anderson ('68)
- Federal District Court Judge Joan N. Ericksen ('81)

Law School

- Dean Alex Johnson
- Professor Ann Burkhart
- Professor Guy-Uriel Charles
- Professor Jim Chen
- Professor John Matheson
- Professor Judith T. Younger

=== 2004 ===
VIP

- Former vice president Walter Mondale ('56)
- Then-Attorney General of Minnesota Mike Hatch ('73)
- Federal District Court Judge James M. Rosenbaum ('69)
- Hennepin County District Court Judge (then Chief Judge) Kevin S. Burke ('75)

Law School

- Dean Alex Johnson
- Professor Dale Carpenter
- Professor Maury Landsman
- Professor John Matheson
- Susan Gainen, director, Career Center

The international students, Frankenlaw, and Igor in the 2007 production of Frankenlaw. Photo by Emily Melvin.

=== 2005 ===
VIP

- Former vice president Walter Mondale ('56)
- Then-Hennepin County District Attorney Amy Klobuchar (currently a U.S. Senator representing Minnesota)
- Hennepin County District Court Judge Stephen Aldrich ('71)

Law School

- Dean Alex Johnson
- Associate Dean of Students Erin Keyes
- Associate Dean Jim Chen
- Professor Bradley Clary
- Professor Laura Cooper
- Professor Maury Landsman
- Professor John Matheson
- Professor Judith T. Younger
- Collins Byrd, then-Director of Admissions
- Susan Gainen, director, Career & Professional Development Center
- Steve Marchese, director, Career & Professional Development Center
- Linda Lokensgard, director, Building & Events

=== 2006 ===
VIP

- Former Minnesota Attorney General Mike Hatch ('73)
- Federal District Court Judge John R. Tunheim ('80)

Law School

- Dean Alex Johnson
- Associate Dean of Students Erin Keyes
- Professor John Matheson
- Professor Judith T. Younger
- Professor Jim Chen
- Susan Gainen, director, Career & Professional Development Center
- Vic Massaglia, Career Advisor in the Career & Professional Development Center

Mob scene from the 2007 production of Frankenlaw. Photo by Jessica Johnson.

=== 2007 ===
VIP

- Former vice president Walter Mondale ('56)
- Federal District Court Judge John R. Tunheim ('80)
- Federal District Court Judge James M. Rosenbaum ('69)
- Minnesota Supreme Court Associate Justice Paul H. Anderson ('68)
- Minnesota Supreme Court Associate Justice Lorie Skjerven Gildea

Law School

- Co-Dean Fred Morrison
- Co-Dean Guy-Uriel Charles
- Professor John Matheson
- Professor Judith T. Younger
- Professor Laura Cooper
- Professor Ruth Okediji
- Professor Stephen Befort
- Professor Bradley Clary
- Professor Maury Landsman
- Professor Prentiss Cox
- Susan Gainen, director, Career & Professional Development Center
- Steven Marchese, director, Career & Professional Development Center
- Vic Massaglia, Career Advisor, Career & Professional Development Center

=== 2008 ===
VIP

- Federal District Court Judge James M. Rosenbaum ('69)
- Minnesota Supreme Court Associate Justice Paul H. Anderson ('68)
- Minnesota Supreme Court Associate Justice Lorie Skjerven Gildea
- Mike Ciresi ('71)

Law School

- Co-Dean Fred Morrison
- Co-Dean Guy-Uriel Charles
- Professor John Matheson
- Professor Judith T. Younger
- Professor Claire Hill
- Professor Richard Frase
- Professor Stephen Befort
- Professor Heidi Kitrosser
- Professor Laura Cooper
- Professor Prentiss Cox
- Susan Gainen, director, Career & Professional Development Center
- Steven Marchese, director, Career & Professional Development Center
- Vic Massaglia, Career Advisor, Career & Professional Development Center

TORT Alumni

- Kirby Petersen ('07)
- Trevor Helmers ('07)

=== 2024 ===
Law School

- Dean William McGeveran
- Dean Jay Wong
- Professor Brad Clary
- Professor Tom Cotter
- Professor Prentiss Cox
- Professor Scott Dewey
- Professor Sapna Kumar
- Professor Andrew Martineau
- Professor Perry Moriearty
- Joy Mbithe Musyimi, Assistant Director, Student Affairs
- Carter Rush, Coordinator of Student Programs, Student Affairs

=== 2025 ===
Notable Appearances

- Minnesota Supreme Court Justice Sarah Hennesy

== Alumni ==
Past TORTfeasors have formed an alumni group called the TORT Alumni Relationship Taskforce (TART). This group is responsible for organizing the alumni after-party for the Saturday night performance of each year's musical. It also hosts alumni events over the course of the year and maintains alumni contact information to help the TORT Executive Board with recruiting VIPs, selling tickets, and generating sponsors.
