= John Rodenberg =

John R. Rodenberg

Judge of the Minnesota Court of Appeals
- In office February 10, 2012 – August 21, 2020
- Appointed by: Mark Dayton
- Preceded by: Edward Toussaint
- Succeeded by: Theodora Gaïtas

Judge of the Minnesota Fifth District Court in Brown County
- In office October 27, 2000 – February 10, 2012
- Appointed by: Jesse Ventura
- Preceded by: Terri Stoneburner
- Succeeded by: Robert Docherty

Personal details
- Born: June 8, 1956 (age 69) New Ulm, Minnesota, U.S.
- Education: St. Olaf College (BA); Hamline University (JD)

John R. Rodenberg (born June 8, 1956) is an American attorney and jurist who served as a judge of the Minnesota Court of Appeals from 2012 to 2020.

== Early life and education ==
Rodenberg was born in New Ulm, Minnesota. He earned a Bachelor of Arts degree from St. Olaf College and a Juris Doctor from Hamline University. During law school, Rodenberg wrote for the Hamline Law Review.

== Career ==
He worked in private practice until 2000, when he was appointed to serve as a district court judge by then-Governor Jesse Ventura. He was elected vice chair of the Minnesota Judicial Council in 2007.

Rodenberg was appointed to the Minnesota Court of Appeals in 2012 by Governor Mark Dayton. He retired on August 21, 2020.

Legal offices
Preceded by Edward Toussaint	Judge of the Minnesota Court of Appeals; 2012–2020	Succeeded by Theodora Gaïtas
