= 2026 Minnesota judicial elections =

2026 judicial elections in Minnesota

- November 3rd, 2026

Nonpartisan elections for multiple judicial positions in Minnesota took place on November 3, 2026. Minnesota Judges are elected to six-year terms in nonpartisan races, with Minnesota Supreme Court judges elected statewide and Court of Appeals and district court judges elected within various jurisdictions.

== State Supreme Court ==
Two seats on the Minnesota Supreme Court were up for election. Both were won by their respective incumbents in uncontested races.

=== Place 1 ===
2026 Minnesota Supreme Place 1 Justice election
- November 3, 2026
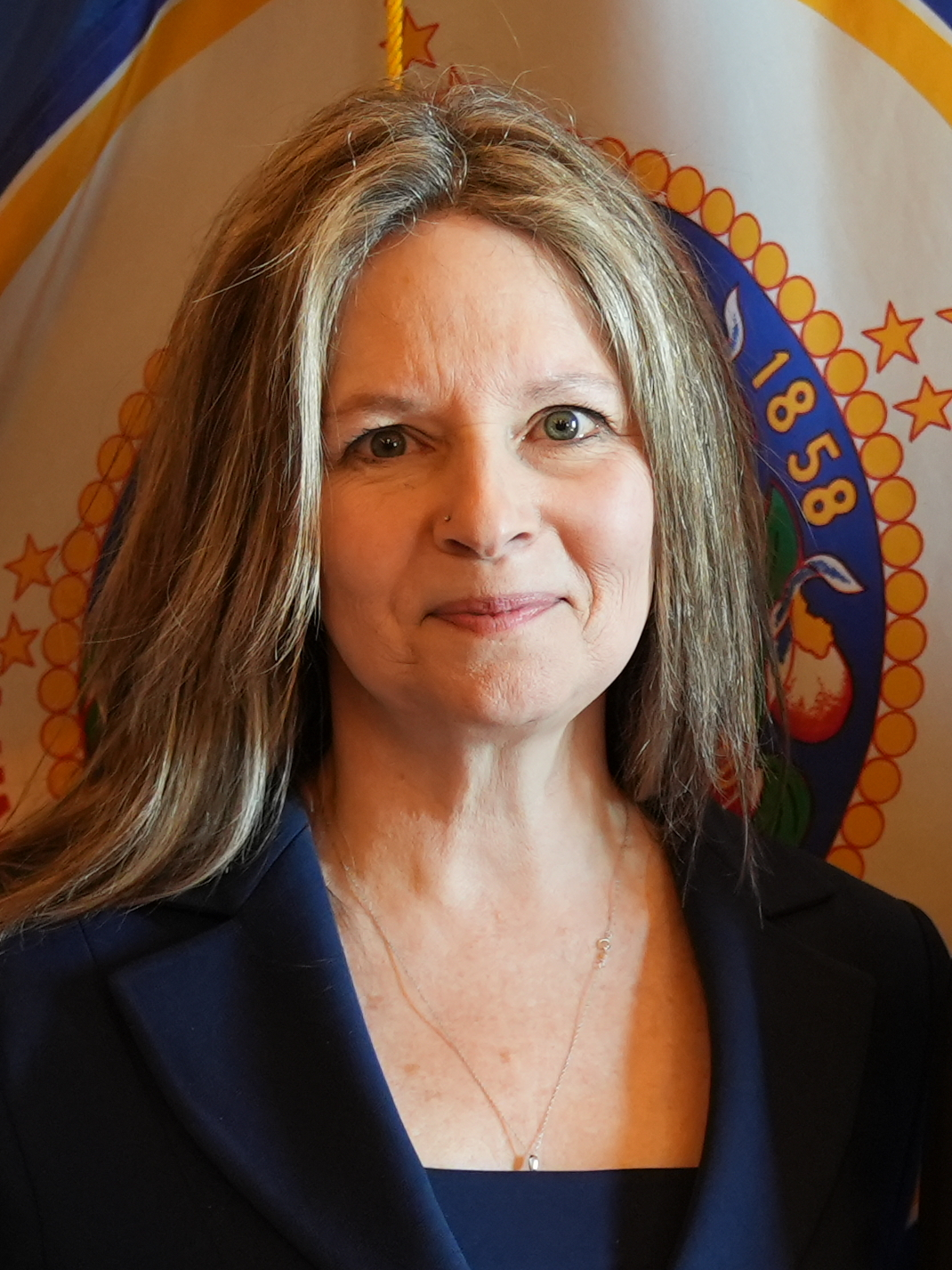
Candidate	Sarah Hennesy
Popular vote	1,639,649
Percentage	98.94%
Associate Justice before election
Sarah Hennesy
Elected Associate Justice
Sarah Hennesy

Incumbent Sarah Hennesy won re-election. She was appointed by Tim Walz in 2024. She previously served as judge of Minnesota's Seventh Judicial District. Her seat was not contested.

2026 Minnesota Supreme Place 1 Justice election
Party	Candidate	Votes	%
Nonpartisan	Sarah Hennesy	1,639,649	98.94%
Write-in		17,640	1.06%
Total votes		1,657,289	100%

=== Place 4 ===
2026 Minnesota Supreme Place 1 Justice election
- November 3, 2026
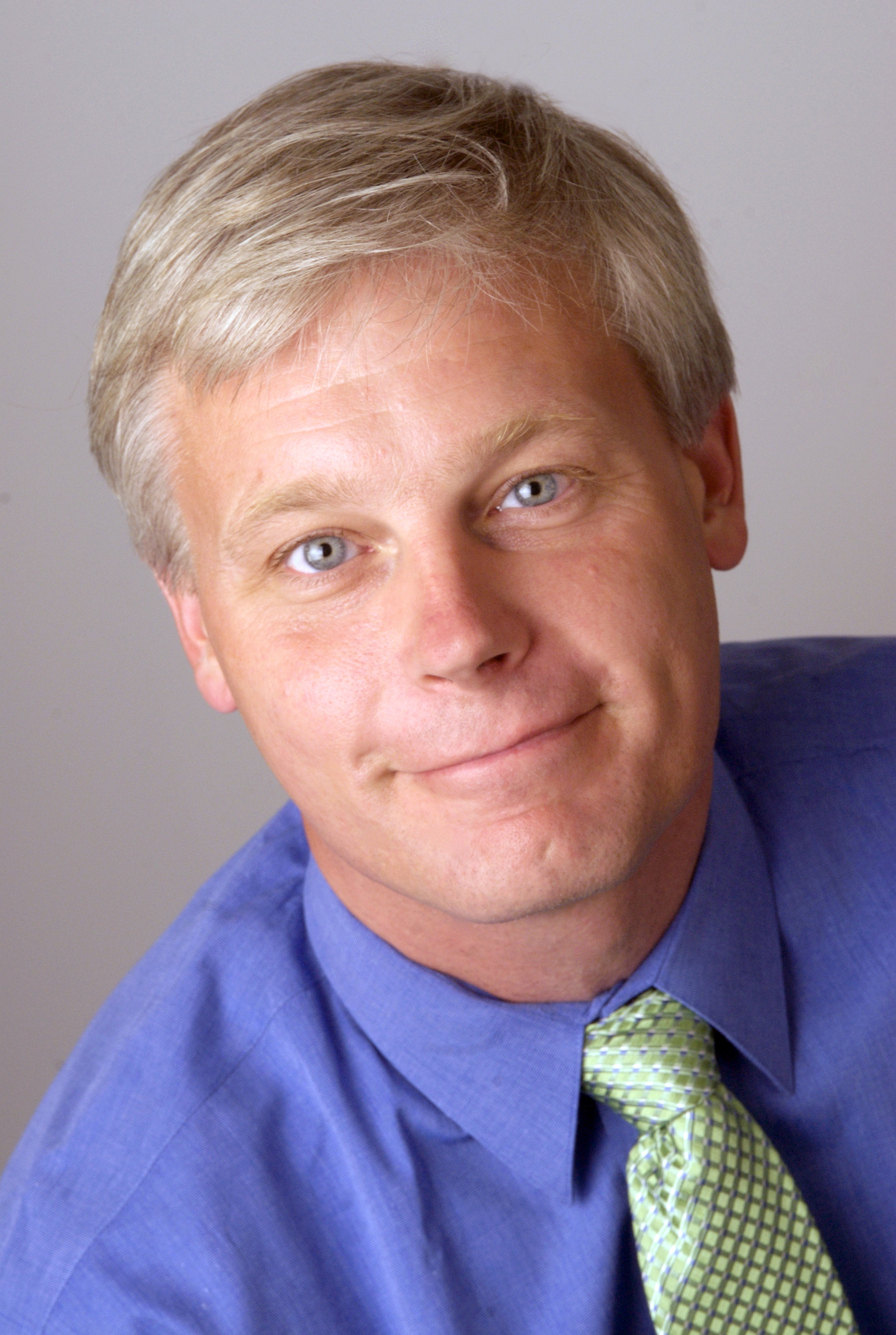
Candidate	Paul Thissen
Popular vote	1,620,663
Percentage	99.00%
Associate Justice before election
Paul Thissen
Elected Associate Justice
Paul Thissen

Incumbent Paul Thissen won re-election. He was appointed in 2018 by Mark Dayton. He previously served as Speaker of the Minnesota House of Representatives. He has unsuccessfully ran for Governor of Minnesota in 2010 and 2018. His seat was not contested.

2026 Minnesota Supreme Place 4 Justice election
Party	Candidate	Votes	%
Nonpartisan	Paul Thissen	1,620,663	99.00%
Write-in		16,395	1.00%
Total votes		1,637,058	100%

== Court of Appeals ==
Five Court of Appeals seats are up for re-election. None of them were contested. All incumbents were re-elected.

Position	Incumbent	First elected	Status	Candidates	Result
1	Elizabeth Bentley	2024	Incumbent	▌ Elizabeth Bentley	Bentley - 99.04%
7	Rachel Bond	2025	Incumbent	▌ Rachel Bond	Bond - 99.04%
13	Jeanne Cochran	2018	Incumbent	▌ Jeanne Cochran	Cochran - 99.06%
15	Kevin Ross	2006	Incumbent	▌ Kevin Ross	Ross - 99.08%
18	JaPaul Harris	2024	Incumbent	▌ JaPaul Harris	Harris - 99.02%
