= Kevin Burke =

Kevin Burke may refer to:

- Kevin Burke (musician) (born 1950), Irish fiddler
- Kevin Burke (CEO), chairman, president, and CEO of Consolidated Edison
- Kevin Burke (judge) (born 1950), district judge in Hennepin County, Minnesota
- Kevin Burke (quarterback) (born 1993), college football quarterback, two-time Gagliardi Trophy winner
- Kevin Burke (American football coach), American football coach and wide receiver
- Kevin Burke (hurler) (born 2000), Irish hurler
- Kevin C. A. Burke (1929–2018), British-American geologist, professor of geology and tectonics at the University of Houston, USA
- Kevin M. Burke (born 1946), American attorney and politician in the Massachusetts House of Representatives
