= Jim Chen =

American legal scholar

23rd Dean of the University of Louisville School of Law
- In office 2007–2012
- Preceded by: Laura Rothstein
- Succeeded by: Susan Duncan (interim)

Personal details
- Education: Emory University (BA, MA); Harvard University (JD)
- Profession: Academic administrator

Jim Chen is an American legal scholar known for his expertise in constitutional law. He holds the Justin Smith Morrill Chair in Law at the Michigan State University College of Law. From 2007 to 2012, he served as the dean of the University of Louisville Brandeis School of Law.

== Education ==
Chen received his B.A. and M.A. from Emory University in 1987. Following his studies at the University of Iceland as a Fulbright Scholar, he earned his J.D., magna cum laude, from Harvard Law School, where he was executive editor of the Harvard Law Review.

Chen is fluent in Taiwanese and French, among other languages.

== Career ==
After law school, Chen clerked for federal judge Michael Luttig on the U.S. Court of Appeals for the Fourth Circuit and for Justice Clarence Thomas of the U.S. Supreme Court.

Chen was a professor of law at the University of Minnesota Law School from 1993 to 2007. While at Minnesota he taught in the areas of administrative law, agricultural law, constitutional law, economic regulation, environmental law, industrial policy, legislation and statutory interpretation, and natural resources law. Chen was active in Minnesota's law journals as an editor of the Constitutional Commentary and of the Minnesota Journal of Law, Science & Technology, as well being as an advisor for the Theatre of the Relatively Talentless during its first four years.

In late 2006, Chen was named as the new dean of the Brandeis School of Law. He served in that position until 2012 when he was appointed as Professor at Michigan State. Along with Frank H. Wu at Wayne State University Law School, Harold Hongju Koh at Yale Law School, and Wallace Loh at the University of Washington School of Law, Chen is one of four Asian Americans who have held the post of dean at an American law school.

Chen is an elected member of the American Law Institute and has served since 2010 as a public member of the Administrative Conference of the United States.

== Scholarship and teaching ==
Chen teaches constitutional law, regulatory state, and upper-level electives such as agriculture law. He has taught law around the world, including at Heinrich Heine University of Düsseldorf in Düsseldorf, Germany, the University of Nantes in Nantes, France, and at Slovak University of Agriculture in Nitra, Slovakia. He writes on the inter-relatedness of mathematics, complexity theory, linguistics, and behavior psychology at Jurisdynamics and manages Law Blog Central, a sister site to Jurisdynamics that also previews other law professor blogs.

== Selected works ==
=== Articles ===
- — (2006). "Filburn's Legacy". Emory Law Journal. 52: 1719. SSRN 901026.
- — (2006). "There's No Such Thing as Biopiracy...And it's a Good Thing Too". McGeorge Law Review. 37. SSRN 781824.
- — (2006). "Constitutional Curiosities: a Twenty-One Question Scavenger Hunt". Minnesota Legal Studies Research Paper No. 06-45. SSRN 929012.
- — (2014). "Measuring Market Risk Under the Basel Accords: VaR, Stressed VaR, and Expected Shortfall". Aestimatio, the IEB International Journal of Finance. 8: 184–201. SSRN 2252463.
- Katz, Daniel Martin; Bommarito, Michael James; Soellinger, Tyler; Chen, James Ming (2017). "Law on the Market? Abnormal Stock Returns and Supreme Court Decision-Making". SSRN. SSRN 2649726.

=== Books and book chapters ===
- Chen, James Ming (2008-09-15). Dorf, Michael C. (ed.). The Story of Wickard v. Filburn: Agriculture, Aggregation, and Commerce (2nd ed.). Foundation Press. ISBN 978-1599411699. SSRN 1268162.
- Farber, Daniel A; Chen, Jim; Verchick, Robert R. M; Sun, Lisa Grow (2015). Disaster law and policy (3rd ed.). New York: Wolters Kluwer. ISBN 978-1-4548-6925-2. OCLC 921253487.

== See also ==
- List of law clerks for the tenth seat of the Supreme Court of the United States
