= Jennifer Frisch =

American judge from Minnesota

Chief Judge of the Minnesota Court of Appeals
- Incumbent
- Assumed office December 31, 2024
- Appointed by: Tim Walz
- Preceded by: Susan Segal

Judge of the Minnesota Court of Appeals
- Incumbent
- Assumed office May 4, 2020
- Appointed by: Tim Walz
- Preceded by: Edward Cleary

Judge of the Second Judicial District of Minnesota
- In office November 22, 2013 – May 4, 2020
- Appointed by: Mark Dayton
- Preceded by: Kathleen R. Gearin
- Succeeded by: Kellie Charles

Personal details
- Born: 1970 or 1971 (age 55–56)
- Education: Macalester College (BA); University of Minnesota (JD)

Jennifer L. Frisch is an American lawyer from Minnesota who is the chief judge of the Minnesota Court of Appeals.

== Education ==
Frisch earned her Bachelor of Arts, magna cum laude, from Macalester College and her Juris Doctor, cum laude, from the University of Minnesota Law School.

== Legal and academic career ==
Frisch served as Senior Associate General Counsel at the University of Minnesota, where she represented the university as trial and appellate counsel in state and federal courts. She teaches legal writing and moot court at the University of Minnesota Law School, coaches and judges collegiate and high school mock trial, and teaches English language learner classes at Neighborhood House.

== State court service ==
On November 22, 2013, Governor Mark Dayton appointed Frisch to be a District Judge for the Second Judicial District in Ramsey County, Minnesota. She filled the vacancy created by Kathleen R. Gearin, who retired. She won election in 2016. During her time on the court she served as assistant chief judge for Ramsey County District Court.

== Minnesota Court of Appeals service ==
In March 2020, Frisch was one of three candidates a merit selection panel submitted to the governor to fill a vacancy on the Court of Appeals. On April 1, 2020, Governor Tim Walz announced Frisch's appointment to the Minnesota Court of Appeals to fill the vacancy left by the retirement of Edward Cleary. She took office on May 4, 2020. On November 26, 2024 Walz appointed Frisch as Chief Judge of the Minnesota Court of Appeals to replace the retiring Susan Segal. Frisch assumed office on December 31, 2024.

Legal offices
Preceded by Edward Cleary	Judge of the Minnesota Court of Appeals; 2020–present	Incumbent
