= Barry Anderson =

American judge (born 1954)

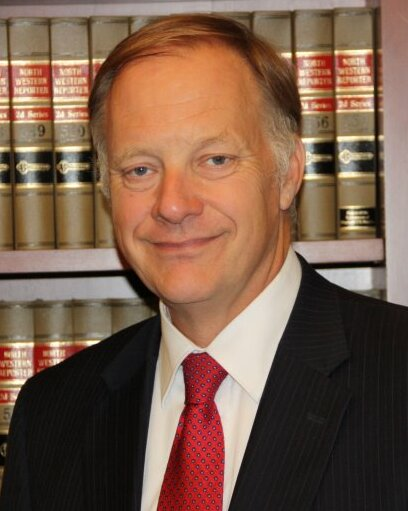

Associate Justice of the Minnesota Supreme Court
- In office October 13, 2004 – May 10, 2024
- Appointed by: Tim Pawlenty
- Preceded by: James H. Gilbert
- Succeeded by: Sarah Hennesy

Judge of the Minnesota Court of Appeals
- In office August 20, 1998 – August 27, 2004
- Appointed by: Arne Carlson
- Succeeded by: Christopher Dietzen

Personal details
- Born: Grant Barry Anderson; October 24, 1954 (age 70); Mankato, Minnesota, U.S.
- Children: 3
- Education: Gustavus Adolphus College (BA); University of Minnesota (JD)

Grant Barry Anderson (born October 24, 1954) is a former associate justice of the Minnesota Supreme Court. He previously served as a member of the Minnesota Court of Appeals.

== Early life and education ==
Anderson was born on October 24, 1954, and grew up in Mankato, Minnesota. He is a 1976 graduate of Gustavus Adolphus College, receiving a Bachelor of Arts, magna cum laude, and a 1979 graduate of the University of Minnesota Law School, receiving a Juris Doctor.

Anderson was a general-practice lawyer in Fairmont and then in Hutchinson, where he served as city attorney for over a decade. He is certified as a civil trial specialist by the Minnesota State Bar Association and is an experienced trial lawyer, representing both plaintiffs and defendants in a wide variety of cases.

== Career ==
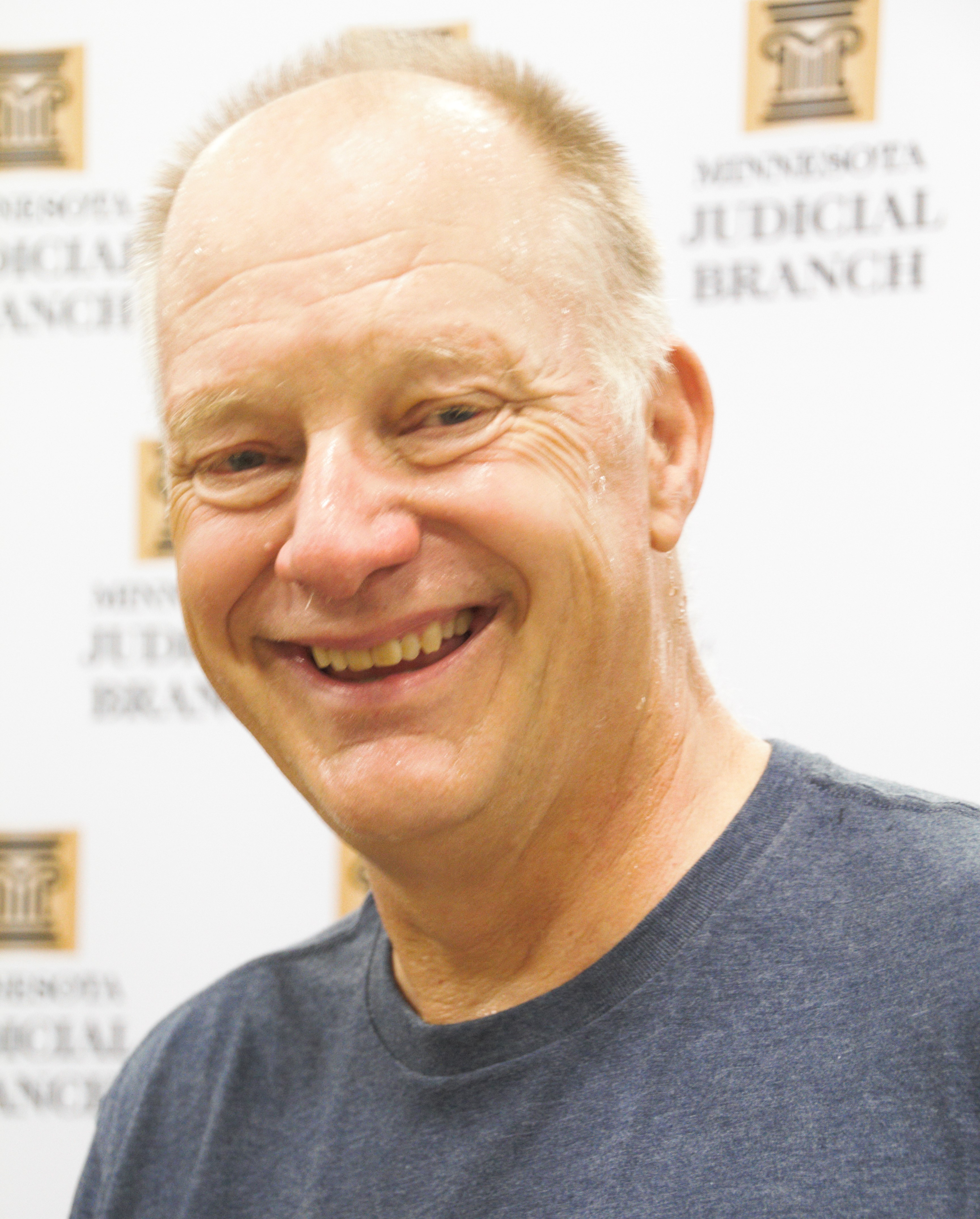
Anderson at the Minnesota State Fair in 2018

Anderson’s background includes service as chairman of the Board of Directors of Hutchinson Community Video Network, a local public-access television effort, two terms as President of the Hutchinson Rotary Club, and other community activities. More recently he has served as a member of the Minnesota Valley YMCA Community Board of Directors, as a youth athletics coach, and as a national judge of the “We the People” high school civics competition. Anderson has also served as the moderator of Pioneer PBS's "Your Legislators" for over 20 years. Anderson is a frequent contributor to continuing legal education efforts and has lectured on the use of expert witnesses and similar topics. He also serves on the Judicial Council, the statewide governing board for the Minnesota Judicial Branch.

Anderson served on the Minnesota Court of Appeals from August 1998 until 2004. He was appointed to the Minnesota Supreme Court by Governor Tim Pawlenty in 2004, beginning October 13, 2004. In 2006, he was elected to a six-year term. Dean Barkley, who briefly served as a U.S. Senator from Minnesota in 2002 after the death of Paul Wellstone, ran against Anderson in the 2012 election. Anderson won reelection to another six-year term with 58.9% of the vote. He retired on May 10, 2024.

Legal offices
Preceded by James Gilbert	Associate Justice of the Minnesota Supreme Court; 2004–2024	Succeeded by Sarah Hennesy
