= Jeanne Cochran =

American attorney and jurist

Judge of the Minnesota Court of Appeals
- Incumbent
- Assumed office 2018
- Appointed by: Mark Dayton
- Preceded by: Randolph W. Peterson

Personal details
- Education: Dartmouth College (BA); University of Minnesota (JD)

Jeanne M. Cochran is an American attorney and jurist serving as a judge of the Minnesota Court of Appeals. She was appointed in 2018 by Governor Mark Dayton and elected to a full term in 2020.

== Education ==
Cochran earned a Bachelor of Arts degree from Dartmouth College and a Juris Doctor from the University of Minnesota Law School.

== Career ==
From 1992 to 1994, Cochran worked as an associate attorney for the Sierra Club Legal Defense Fund. From 1994 to 1996, she was an associate at Leonard, Street & Deinard in Minneapolis. From 1998 to 2000, Cochran served as a legislative analyst and attorney for the Minnesota House of Representatives Research Department. From 2000 to 2012, she served as an assistant attorney general in the Minnesota Attorney General's Office, specializing in civil litigation. Cochran served as an administrative law judge of the Minnesota Office of Administrative Hearings. She was appointed to the Minnesota Court of Appeals in 2018, succeeding Randolph W. Peterson.
