= Sarah Hennesy =

American judge

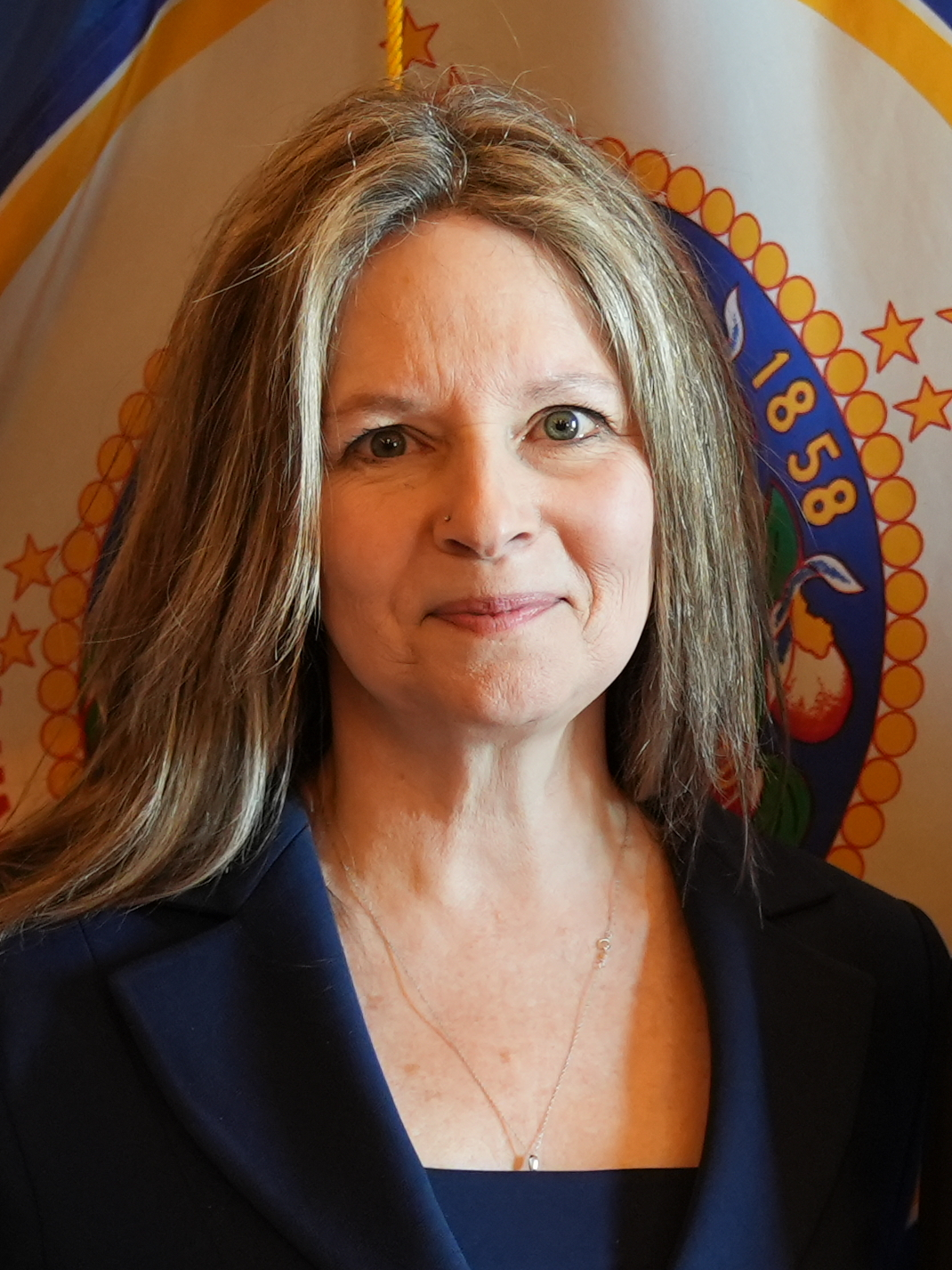
- Hennesy c. 2024

Associate Justice of the Minnesota Supreme Court
- Incumbent
- Assumed office May 13, 2024
- Appointed by: Tim Walz
- Preceded by: G. Barry Anderson

Personal details
- Born: 1969 or 1970 (age 56–57)
- Education: Central College (BA); Drake University (JD)

Sarah E. Hennesy (born 1969 or 1970) is an American lawyer who serves as an associate justice of the Minnesota Supreme Court. She was previously a district court judge (Seventh Judicial District) from 2012 to 2024, and served as the chief judge of the Seventh District from 2021 to 2024.

== Education ==
Hennesy earned a Bachelor of Arts from Central College in 1991 and a Juris Doctor from Drake Law School in 1994.

== Career ==
From 1994 to 1996, Hennesy was an assistant appellate defender in the State Appellate Defender's Office. From 1998 to 1999, she was an associate attorney with Kohn & Einstein in Washington, D.C. From 1999 to 2003, she worked at the Alexandria Public Defender's Office in Alexandria, Virginia. From 2003 to 2005, she was an associate attorney with Damiani & Damiani, P.C., in Alexandria, Virginia. From 2006 to 2012, she was a staff attorney with the St. Cloud Area Legal Services of St. Cloud, Minnesota.

On March 12, 2012, Governor Mark Dayton appointed Hennesy to serve as a judge of Minnesota's Seventh Judicial District. She replaced Judge Steven P. Ruble, who retired in 2011. In December 2023, Hennesy was one of three candidates named to fill a vacancy on the Minnesota Court of Appeals. The vacancy came after the resignation of Judge Jeffrey Bryan, who was appointed by President Joe Biden to the United States District Court for the District of Minnesota.

=== Appointment to Minnesota Supreme Court ===
In April 2024, Hennesy was one of six candidates named for possible appointment to the Minnesota Supreme Court. On April 22, 2024, Governor Tim Walz announced Hennesy's appointment. She was appointed to the seat vacated by the retirement of Justice G. Barry Anderson. Hennesy took office on May 13, 2024. Walz also announced the appointment of Judge Theodora Gaïtas to fill the upcoming vacancy created by the retirement of Justice Margaret Chutich. With their appointments, the court had a majority of women for the first time since Justice Rosalie E. Wahl retired in 1994. As of October 2026, this is no longer the case due to the appointment of Reynaldo Aligada on October 1st, 2026.

== See also ==
- List of female state supreme court justices

Legal offices
Preceded by G. Barry Anderson	Associate Justice of the Minnesota Supreme Court; 2024–present	Incumbent
