= Stauber =

Stauber is a surname. Notable people with the surname include:

- Allan Stauber (born 1944), American bridge player
- Dalit Stauber (born 1959), Israeli educator
- Dan Stauber, American ice hockey player and coach
- Edith Stauber (born 1968), Austrian film director and illustrator
- Emma Stauber (born 1993), American ice hockey player
- Jack Stauber (born 1996), American musician, YouTuber and animator
- Jaxson Stauber (born 1999), American ice hockey player
- Jenny Stauber, Australian ecotoxicologist
- John Stauber (born 1953), American writer and activist
- Larry Stauber (born 1947), American judge
- Pete Stauber (born 1966), American politician from Minnesota
- Robb Stauber (born 1967), American ice hockey player
- Roni Stauber (born 1961), Israeli historian

== See also ==
- 24547 Stauber, a main-belt minor planet
