= Anne McKeig =

American judge (born 1967)

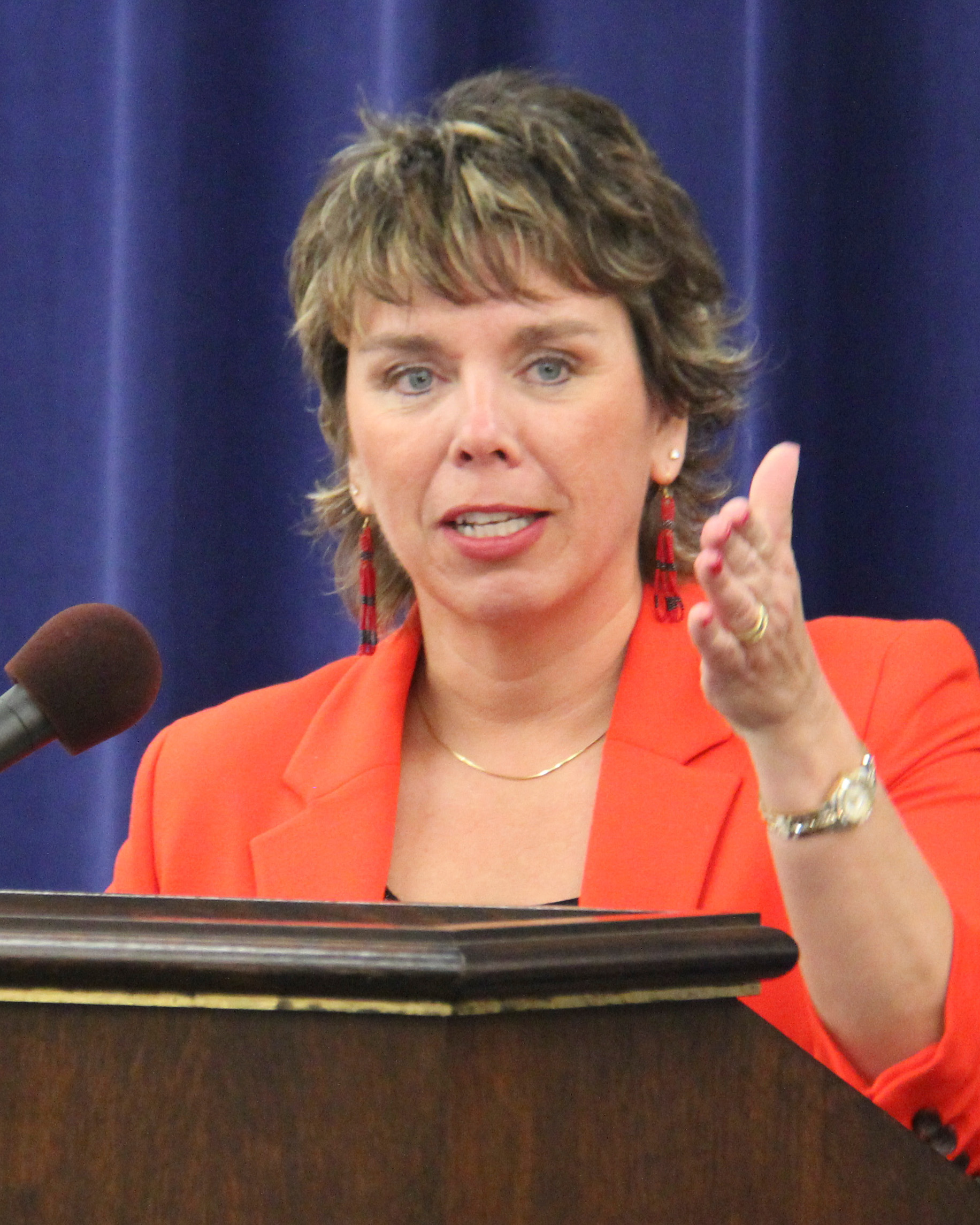
- McKeig in 2018

Associate Justice of the Minnesota Supreme Court
- Incumbent
- Assumed office September 1, 2016
- Appointed by: Mark Dayton
- Preceded by: Christopher Dietzen

Personal details
- Born: February 9, 1967 (age 59)
- Education: St. Catherine University (BA); Hamline University (JD)

Anne K. McKeig (born February 9, 1967) is an American lawyer serving as an associate justice of the Minnesota Supreme Court. She is its first Native American justice and the first Native American woman to serve on any state supreme court. From 2008 to 2016, she was a judge of the Minnesota Fourth District Court in Hennepin County.

== Early life and education ==
McKeig was raised in Federal Dam, Minnesota, and attended Northland High School in Remer, Minnesota. She is a descendant of the White Earth Band of Ojibwe.

McKeig received a Bachelor of Arts from St. Catherine University in 1989 and a J.D. degree from Hamline University School of Law in 1992.

== Career ==
McKeig was an assistant attorney for Hennepin County of the child protection division, specializing in Native American child welfare cases, for more than 15 years.

McKeig was a family court judge of the Minnesota Fourth District Court in Hennepin County, appointed by Republican Governor Tim Pawlenty in 2008. She was the presiding judge of the family court since 2013.

DFL Governor Mark Dayton announced his appointment of McKeig to the Minnesota Supreme Court on June 28, 2016. She is its first Native American justice as well as the first female Native American to serve on any state supreme court. Her appointment also marked the second time the court had a majority of women since 1991. She joined the court on August 31, 2016. Her formal investiture ceremony was held on September 15, 2016.

McKeig is also an adjunct professor at Mitchell Hamline School of Law.

== See also ==
- List of Native American jurists

Legal offices
Preceded by Christopher Dietzen	Associate Justice of the Minnesota Supreme Court; 2016–present	Incumbent
