= Randolph W. Peterson =

American lawyer

Randolph Peterson
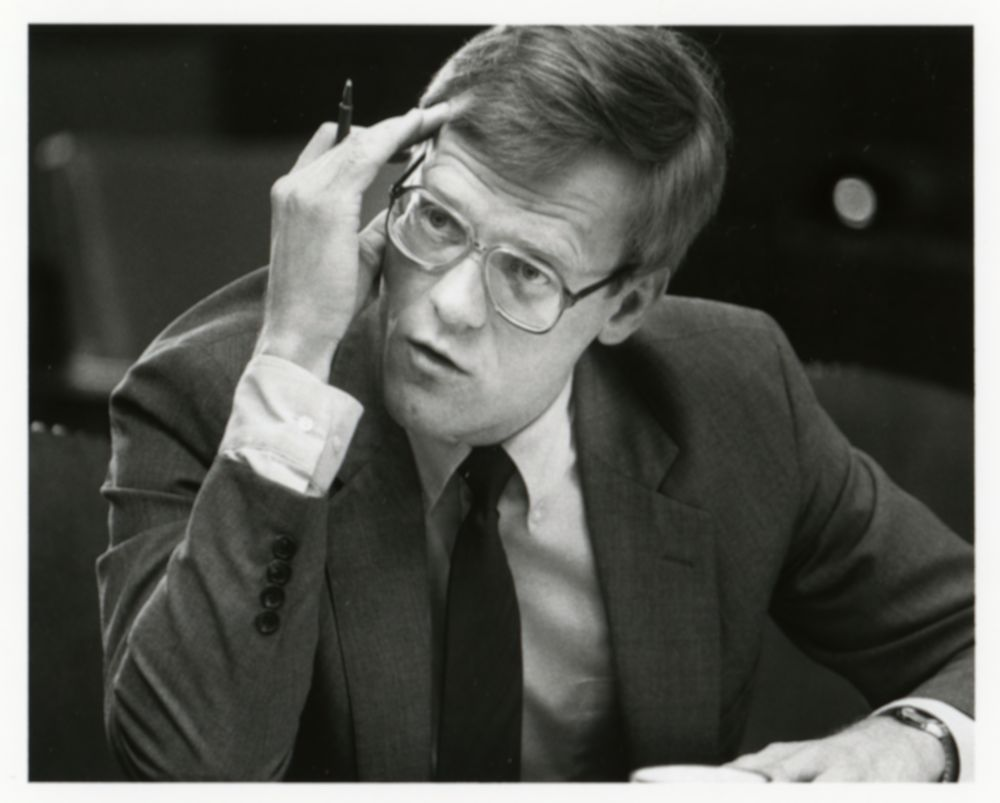
- Peterson between 1987-1990

Judge of the Minnesota Court of Appeals
- In office 1990–2018
- Appointed by: Rudy Perpich
- Succeeded by: Jeanne Cochran

Member of the Minnesota Senate
- In office 1981–1990

Personal details
- Born: September 11, 1953 (age 72) Minneapolis, Minnesota, U.S.
- Party: Democratic
- Education: University of Minnesota (BA, JD)

Randolph W. Peterson (born September 11, 1953) was an American attorney, politician, and jurist.

== Early life and education ==
Peterson was born in Minneapolis and graduated from the Forest Lake Area High School in Forest Lake, Minnesota. He received a Bachelor of Arts degree in political science from the University of Minnesota in 1976 and his Juris Doctor degree from the University of Minnesota Law School in 1979.

== Career ==
After graduating from law school, he was admitted to the Minnesota State Bar Association. Peterson served in the Minnesota Senate from 1981 to 1990 and was a Democrat. In 1990, Peterson was appointed to the Minnesota Court of Appeals. He left the court in 2018 and was succeeded by Jeanne Cochran.

== Personal life ==
Peterson lived in Wyoming, Minnesota, with his wife and family.
