= Daniel Wozniak =

Daniel Wozniak may refer to:

- Daniel Wozniak (athlete), Polish Paralympic athlete
- Daniel Wozniak (murderer) (born 1984), American murderer
- Daniel Donald Wozniak (1922–2005), or D.D. Wozniak, American politician and judge
