= John Simonett =

John Simonett may refer to:

- John E. Simonett, attorney and Minnesota Supreme Court judge
- John Richard Simonett, politician in Ontario, Canada
