= Michelle Ann Larkin =

American lawyer

Judge of the Minnesota Court of Appeals
- Incumbent
- Assumed office July 14, 2008
- Appointed by: Tim Pawlenty
- Preceded by: Christopher Dietzen

Personal details
- Born: 1967 (age 58–59)
- Education: University of Minnesota; William Mitchell College of Law

Michelle Larkin (born 1967) is an American lawyer and judge from Minnesota serving as a judge of the Minnesota Court of Appeals.

== Early life and education ==
Larkin earned her undergraduate degree from University of Minnesota in 1988 and worked for the Minnesota House of Representatives Judiciary Committee in the 1989 and 1990 legislative sessions. She earned her J.D. from William Mitchell College of Law in 1992, graduating magna cum laude.

== Career ==
From 1992 to 2001, Larkin worked as an attorney in the Hennepin County Public Defender's office. From 2001 to 2005, she worked there as a senior attorney and trial team supervisor.

== Judicial service ==
Governor Tim Pawlenty appointed Larkin to the district court bench on November 10, 2005. On June 24, 2008, he announced her appointment to the Court of Appeals seat previously occupied by Christopher Dietzen, whom Pawlenty had named to the Minnesota Supreme Court. Larkin was reelected in 2010, 2016, and 2022.
