= Christopher Dietzen =

American judge

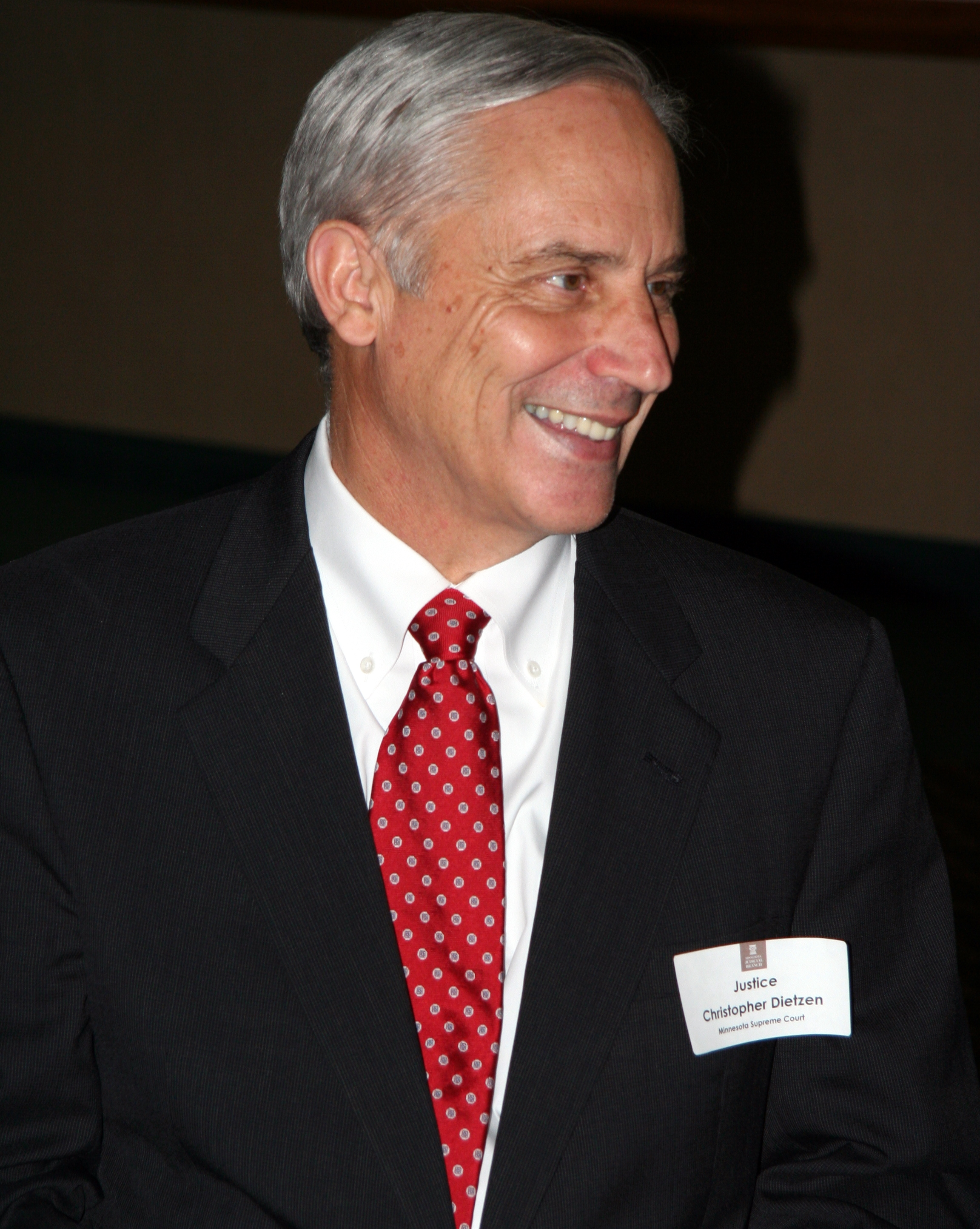
- Diezten in 2010

Associate Justice of the Minnesota Supreme Court
- In office February 19, 2008 – August 31, 2016
- Appointed by: Tim Pawlenty
- Preceded by: Sam Hanson
- Succeeded by: Anne McKeig

Judge of the Minnesota Court of Appeals
- In office December 15, 2004 – February 19, 2008
- Appointed by: Tim Pawlenty
- Preceded by: Barry Anderson
- Succeeded by: Michelle Ann Larkin

Personal details
- Born: March 8, 1947 (age 79) Yakima, Washington
- Education: Gonzaga University (B.B.A., J.D.)

Christopher Dietzen (born March 8, 1947) was an associate justice of the Minnesota Supreme Court from 2008 to 2016 and a judge of the Minnesota Court of Appeals from 2004 to 2008.

== Early life and education ==
Dietzen was born on March 8, 1947, in Yakima, Washington. He attended Gonzaga University as an undergraduate and law student, receiving a Bachelor of Business Administration degree in 1969 and a Juris Doctor in 1973.

== Career ==
Dietzen was an attorney with the law firm of Larkin, Hoffman, Daly & Lindren, Ltd., of Bloomington, Minnesota, from 1978 to 2004, and with the firm of Richter, Wimberly, & Ericson in Spokane, Washington, from 1973 to 1977. He also served as an attorney for Tim Pawlenty during his 2002 gubernatorial campaign.

Dietzen joined the Minnesota Supreme Court on February 19, 2008. He was appointed to the court by Pawlenty after the resignation of Justice Sam Hanson. From December 15, 2004, to February 19, 2008, he served as a judge on the Minnesota Court of Appeals. He was likewise appointed to that judgeship by Pawlenty and then elected to it in 2006.

In 2001 and 2004, Dietzen contributed $250 to the reelection campaign of Norm Coleman, with his last donation occurring almost a year before he became a judge.

Dietzen retired from the Supreme Court on August 31, 2016, seven months before reaching the mandatory retirement age.

Legal offices
Preceded by Barry Anderson	Judge of the Minnesota Court of Appeals; 2004–2008	Succeeded by Michelle Ann Larkin
Preceded by Sam Hanson	Associate Justice of the Minnesota Supreme Court; 2008–2016	Succeeded by Anne McKeig
