= Sam Hanson =

American judge

Associate Justice of the Minnesota Supreme Court
- In office September 3, 2002 – January 1, 2008
- Appointed by: Jesse Ventura
- Preceded by: Joan N. Ericksen
- Succeeded by: Christopher Dietzen

Judge of the Minnesota Court of Appeals
- In office November 2000 – September 3, 2002
- Appointed by: Jesse Ventura
- Succeeded by: Wilhelmina Wright

Personal details
- Born: August 26, 1939 (age 87) Mankato, Minnesota, U.S.
- Spouse: Mirja
- Children: 6

Samuel Lee Hanson (born August 26, 1939) is an American lawyer and judge from the state of Minnesota. He served on the Minnesota Court of Appeals from 2000 to 2002 and as an associate justice of the Minnesota Supreme Court from 2002 to 2008. When not serving on the bench, he has practiced with the Minneapolis law firm of Briggs & Morgan.

== Biography ==
Hanson earned an undergraduate degree in economics and istory from St. Olaf College in 1961. He received a Juris Doctor from William Mitchell College of Law in 1965.

After law school, Hanson clerked for future Chief Justice Douglas Amdahl and Justice Robert Sheran before joining Briggs & Morgan, where he specialized in civil litigation and utility regulation. In 2000, he was appointed to the Minnesota Court of Appeals by Governor Jesse Ventura, where he served until his appointment to the Supreme Court. In 2007, he announced that he would step down from the Court, effective at the beginning of 2008. Governor Tim Pawlenty named Minnesota Court of Appeals Judge Christopher Dietzen to succeed Justice Hanson.

Hanson and his wife, Mirja, have six children: Greta, Chrystina, Benjamin, Leif, Luke, and Jai.

Legal offices
Preceded by Joan N. Ericksen	Associate Justice; Minnesota Supreme Court; 2002-2008	Succeeded by Christopher Dietzen
