= Sarah Wheelock =

American lawyer and jurist

Judge of the Minnesota Court of Appeals
- Incumbent
- Assumed office January 10, 2022
- Appointed by: Tim Walz
- Preceded by: Carol Wooten

Personal details
- Education: University of Iowa (BA, JD)

Sarah Wheelock is an American lawyer and jurist serving as a judge of the Minnesota Court of Appeals. She was appointed to the court by Governor Tim Walz on December 1, 2021, and assumed office on January 10, 2022.

== Education ==
Wheelock earned a Bachelor of Arts degree from the University of Iowa and a Juris Doctor from the University of Iowa College of Law.

== Career ==
Before her appointment as a judge, Wheelock served as legal counsel for the Shakopee Mdewakanton Sioux Community in Prior Lake, Minnesota. She also worked an appellate judge of the White Earth Band of Chippewa Court of Appeals and an adjunct professor at the Hamline University School of Law. A member of Meskwaki Nation, Wheelock is the first Native American judge to sit on the Minnesota Court of Appeals.
