= Kevin Burke (judge) =

American judge

Kevin Burke is a former judge of the District Court of Minnesota in Hennepin County, Minnesota who served from July 25, 1984 to September 17, 2020.

== Early life and education ==
Burke received his Bachelor of Arts in political science from the University of Minnesota in 1972, and received his Juris Doctor in 1975.

== Legal career ==
Burke served as an assistant public defender in the Hennepin County Public Defenders Office from 1975 until 1979. He left the Public Defenders office in 1979 to be partner at the law firm of Ranum, Quackenbush & Burke. In 1980 he left Ranum, Quackenbush & Burke for a partnership at Chestnut & Brooks, P.A. where he stayed until 1984.

== Judicial service ==
Burke was first appointed to the bench on July 25, 1984. He was elected to a six year term in 1986 and reelected in 1992, 1998, 2004 and 2010. He created and served as the presiding judge for Hennepin County's Drug Court from January 1, 1997 until June 30, 2000. At the time the Hennepin County Drug Court was one of the largest drug courts in the nation. He was elected for four terms as chief judge (July 1, 1992 – June 30, 1996; July 1, 2000 – June 30, 2004) and three terms as assistant chief judge (July 1, 1989 – June 30, 1992; December 1998-June 30, 2000). From 1991 to 1996 he served as the chair of the Conference of Chief Judges. He chaired the State Board of Public Defense and was a leader in the effort to improve and expand the state's public defender system.

Burke turned 70 years old on September 17, 2021, hitting the mandatory retirement age for a Minnesota judge.

== Awards ==
In addition, Burke has taught at the University of Minnesota Law School since 1989 and at the University of St. Thomas Law School since 2003. From 1986 until 1990 he served on the faculty of the University of Minnesota's Hubert H. Humphrey Institute of Public Affairs Reflective Leadership Program. He has been a speaker in many states as well as Canada, Egypt, Mexico, China, India and Ireland regarding improvement in judicial administration and court leadership. He is a board member of the American Judicature Society and the Institute for the Reform of the American Legal System.

In 1997, Judge Burke received the Director's Community Leadership Award from the Federal Bureau of Investigation. In 2002, the National Center for State Courts awarded him the Distinguished Service Award. In 2003, he was selected as the William H. Rehnquist Award recipient by the National Center for State Courts. The Rehnquist Award is presented annually to a state judge who exemplifies the highest level of judicial excellence, integrity, fairness and professional ethics. He was awarded Public Official of the Year by Governing Magazine in 2004. In 2005, the Minnesota Chapter of the American Board of Trial Advocates named him trial judge of the year. Recently the magazine Law & Politics named him one of the one hundred most influential lawyers in the history of the State of Minnesota.

== Publications ==
Below is a partial list of Judge Burke's publications. Recently he co-authored with Judge Steve Leben a white paper for the American Judges Association on Procedural Fairness. His other articles are listed below:

- "The Evolution of the Trial Judge From Counting Case Dispositions to a Commitment to Fairness," Vol. 18, No. 2, Widener Law Journal, 2009.
- "Understanding the International Rule of Law as a Commitment to Procedural Fairness," Vol. 18, Issue 2, Minnesota Journal of International Law, Summer 2009.
- "State v. Dettman: The End of the Sentencing Revolution or Just the Beginning?" Vol. 33, No. 4, William Mitchell Law Review, 2007.
- "Judging the Courts," Vol. 48, No. 3, State News, March 2005.
- "A Judiciary That Is as Good as Its Promise: The Best Strategy for Preserving Judicial Independence," Vol. 41, Issue 2, Court Review, Summer 2004
- "The Tyranny of the "Or" is the Threat to Judicial Independence, Not Problem-Solving Courts," Vol. 41, Issue 2, Court Review, Summer 2004
- "A Court and a Judiciary That Is as Good as Its Promise," Vol. 73, No. 1, The Hennepin Lawyer, January/February 2004
- "A Court and a Judiciary That Is as Good as Its Promise," Vol. 40, Issue 2, Court Review, Summer 2003
- "Transforming the District Court," Vol. 72, No. 1, ¬The Hennepin Lawyer, January 2003
- "The Hennepin County Drug Court: A Progress Report," Vol. 69, No. 5, The Hennepin Lawyer, May 2000.
- "Drugs and the Legal System," Vol. 72, No. 1, Spectrum, The Journal of State Government, Winter 1999.
- "That was Then; This is Now," Vol. 62, No. 5, The Hennepin Lawyer, May/June 1993.
- "Doing the System Justice: Toward the Creation of a More Healthy Judiciary," Vol. 7, No. 1, Law & Politics, April 19, 1992.
- "New Chief Judge Eyes Courtroom Changes," Vol. 62, No. 2, The Hennepin Lawyer, Nov/Dec 1992.
- "Misconduct on the Bench, or . . . What to do With Judges Who are Cantankerous," Vol. 49, No. 4, The Hennepin Lawyer, Mar/Apr 1992.
- "Chief Justice A.M. 'Sandy' Keith," The Hennepin Lawyer, Mar/Apr 1991.
- "State on New Course for Sentencing: 'Just Desserts,'" Vol. 6, No. 6, Minnesota Trial Lawyer, Sept/Oct 1981.
- Public Defender Trial Lawyers Manual, published October 1979 by Minnesota Public Defenders Association and Hennepin County Public Defenders Office through L.E.A.A. grant.
- "DWI – A New Law – An Old Approach," Vol. 48, No. 2, The Hennepin Lawyer, Nov/Dec 1978.
