= Anne Simonett =

American judge

Chief Judge of the Minnesota Court of Appeals
- In office July 1, 1994 – March 31, 1995
- Appointed by: Arne Carlson
- Preceded by: Paul H. Anderson
- Succeeded by: Edward Toussaint, Jr.

Personal details
- Born: July 30, 1952 Little Falls, Minnesota
- Died: May 6, 1995 (aged 42) Hennepin County, Minnesota
- Spouse: Henry Shea
- Children: Two
- Education: Lawrence University; Yale University; Harvard University

Anne V. Simonett (1952–1995) was an American lawyer and judge from Minnesota. She was the first woman to be Chief Judge of the Minnesota Court of Appeals.

The daughter of the Minnesota Supreme Court Justice John E. Simonett, Anne Simonett received a degree in music from Lawrence University in Appleton, Wisconsin. She received a master's degree in music performance, graduating magna cum laude from Yale University. She received her law degree from Harvard University in 1981.

Simonett worked in business litigation for Faegre & Benson and became a partner. She was appointed a trial court judge in Minnesota's Fourth Judicial District. In 1994 Governor Arne Carlson named her to be Chief Judge of the Minnesota Court of Appeals, succeeding Chief Judge Paul H. Anderson, who had been appointed to the Minnesota Supreme Court.

During her first year in office, Simonett was diagnosed with an incurable brain tumor. She resigned on March 31, 1995 and died on May 6 the same year.

Legal offices
Preceded by Paul H. Anderson	Chief Judge of the Minnesota Court of Appeals; 1994 - 1995	Succeeded by Edward Toussaint, Jr.
