= Paul Anderson (judge) =

American judge

Paul H. Anderson
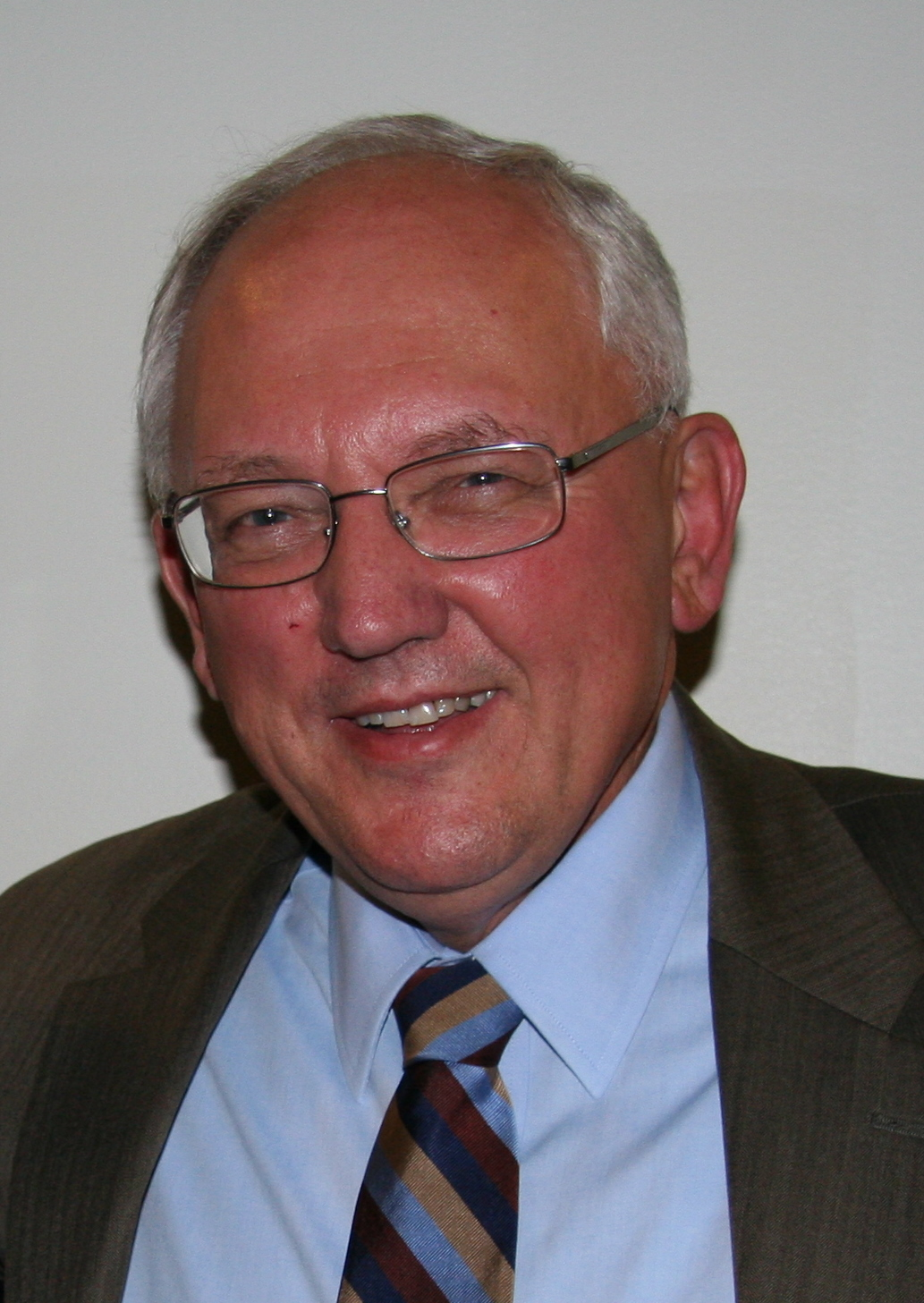
- Anderson in 2010

Associate Justice of the Minnesota Supreme Court
- In office July 1, 1994 – May 31, 2013
- Appointed by: Arne Carlson
- Preceded by: John Simonett
- Succeeded by: David Lillehaug

Chief Judge of the Minnesota Court of Appeals
- In office September 1, 1992 – June 30, 1994
- Appointed by: Arne Carlson
- Preceded by: D.D. Wozniak
- Succeeded by: Anne Simonett

Personal details
- Born: May 14, 1943 (age 83) Eden Prairie, Minnesota, U.S.
- Spouse: Jan
- Children: 2 (1 deceased)
- Education: Macalester College (BA); University of Minnesota (JD)

Paul Holden Anderson (born May 14, 1943) is an American attorney and jurist who served as an associate justice of the Minnesota Supreme Court. He served as chief judge of the Minnesota Court of Appeals from 1992 to 1994.

== Early life and education ==
Anderson was born in Eden Prairie, Minnesota, to Helen Holden Anderson, the first president of the Eden Prairie Historical Society. He earned a Bachelor of Arts degree from Macalester College in 1965 and a Juris Doctor form the University of Minnesota Law School in 1968.

== Career ==
Before his appointment to the judicial branch, Anderson was in private practice as a partner in the law firm of LeVander, Gillen & Miller Law Offices in South Saint Paul. He served as a VISTA attorney from 1968 to 1969 and as a special Assistant Attorney General in the Criminal Division and Department of Public Safety of the Office of the Minnesota Attorney General from 1970 to 1971. He served on Arne Carlson's 1990 Minnesota gubernatorial campaign committee.

Governor Carlson appointed Anderson to the Minnesota Court of Appeals as Chief Judge, beginning on September 1, 1992. Two years later, Carlson appointed Anderson to be an associate justice of the Minnesota Supreme Court, beginning on July 1, 1994. He is the author of many important decisions, including a leading case on bail, State of Minnesota vs. Wesley Brooks. Anderson retired on May 31, 2013, when he reached the statutorily mandatory retirement age for judges in Minnesota.

== Personal life ==
Anderson lives in St. Paul with his wife, Jan, who worked as the human resources director at Metropolitan State University. They have one daughter, Isa, who is an elementary school teacher. Their second daughter, Marina, died in 2005.

Legal offices
Preceded by D.D. Wozniak	Chief Judge of the Minnesota Court of Appeals; 1992–1994	Succeeded by Anne Simonett
Preceded by John Simonett	Associate Justice of the Minnesota Supreme Court; 1994–2013	Succeeded by David Lillehaug
