= James H. Gilbert =

American judge (born 1947)

Associate Justice of the Minnesota Supreme Court (Ret.)
- In office January 29, 1998 – August 9, 2004
- Appointed by: Arne Carlson
- Preceded by: A.M. Sandy Keith
- Succeeded by: G. Barry Anderson

Personal details
- Born: March 11, 1947 (age 79)
- Education: University of Minnesota (BA, JD)

James H. Gilbert (born March 11, 1947) is an American attorney who was a justice of the Minnesota Supreme Court from 1998 to 2004.

== Early life and education ==
Gilbert was born on March 11, 1947, and grew up in Minneapolis and Edina, Minnesota. He is a 1969 graduate of the University of Minnesota, receiving a Bachelor of Arts in political science with a minor in economics, and a 1972 graduate of the University of Minnesota Law School, receiving a Juris Doctor.

== Career ==
Gilbert engaged in the private practice of law in Minnesota from 1972 to 1998 with and as a shareholder in Meshbesher and Spence, Ltd., in Minneapolis, Minnesota. He was Chief Executive Officer of the firm from 1996 to 1997 and as managing partner from 1984 to 1992. Gilbert was also licensed to practice law in Wisconsin from 1984 to 2007 and before the United States Supreme Court in 1988. He was certified as a Civil Trial Specialist by the Minnesota State Bar Association from 1997 through 2003. He is a member of the American Bar Association, the Minnesota State Bar Association, and is a Life Member of The Fellows of the American Bar Association.

Gilbert was appointed to the Minnesota Supreme Court by Governor Arne Carlson in 1998 and elected to the Court in 2000 with 69% of the statewide vote. He was an Associate Justice from January 1998 to August 2004. He was appointed by the Minnesota Supreme Court to be Acting Chief Justice from August to September 2008 to hear a contested election case. Gilbert is currently President of Gilbert Mediation Center, Ltd., and the James H. Gilbert Law Group, PLLC, focusing on alternative dispute resolution.

Gilbert's background includes being a member in 1991 and then Chair from 1992 to 1997 of the Judicial Merit Selection Commission for the State of Minnesota, Chair of the Minnesota Supreme Court Standing Committee for Administration of No-Fault Arbitration from 2004 to 2008, Hearing Chair for the Minnesota News Council from 2005 to 2012, and as a member of the Minnesota D.A.R.E. State Board of Directors from 1998 to 2007. In 2004, Gilbert was awarded the Distinguished Jurist Award by the Academy of Certified Trial Lawyers of Minnesota.

Gilbert co-authored the Alternative Dispute Resolutions section of the Minnesota State Bar Association Civil Practice Deskbook from 2009-2024.
