= Susan Segal =

American judge from Minnesota

Chief Judge of the Minnesota Court of Appeals
- In office May 1, 2020 – December 31, 2024
- Appointed by: Tim Walz
- Preceded by: Edward J. Cleary
- Succeeded by: Jennifer Frisch

Judge of the Minnesota Court of Appeals
- In office November 26, 2019 – December 31, 2024
- Appointed by: Tim Walz
- Preceded by: Jill Flaskamp Halbrooks
- Succeeded by: Rachel Bond

City Attorney of Minneapolis, Minnesota
- In office 2008–2020
- Appointed by: R. T. Rybak

Personal details
- Born: 1954 or 1955 (age 70–71) Minneapolis, Minnesota
- Parent: Gloria Segal (mother)
- Education: University of California, Berkeley (B.A.); University of Michigan Law School (J.D.)

Susan Segal is an American lawyer from Minnesota who served as chief judge of the Minnesota Court of Appeals from 2020 to 2024. She previously served as the city attorney of Minneapolis. Segal reached the mandatory retirement age of 70 in December 2024, and retired at the end of the month.

== Education ==
Segal earned her Bachelor of Arts from the University of California, Berkeley, and her Juris Doctor, cum laude, from the University of Michigan Law School.

== Legal career ==
Segal established her own law firm, Susan Segal PLLC, focused on employment law. She was also a partner at Gray, Plant, Mooty, Mooty & Bennett, P.A., and then a senior attorney at the Hennepin County Attorney's Office. In 2008, Mayor R. T. Rybak named her Minneapolis City Attorney. In that role, she was responsible for the city's legal work, including all litigation involving the city and its boards and commissions, and managed an office of 110 employees.

== Minnesota Court of Appeals service ==
On October 9, 2019, Governor Tim Walz announced Segal's appointment as a judge of the Minnesota Court of Appeals. She took office on November 26, 2019, filling the vacancy left by Jill Flaskamp Halbrooks. On April 13, 2020, Walz named Segal as Chief Judge of the Court of Appeals.

== Community activities ==
Segal's community involvement includes service as chair of the board of trustees of the Women's Foundation of Minnesota and board member of Minnesota Film and TV; she was previously the chair of the Mental Health Association of Minnesota board.

== Personal life ==
Segal is the daughter of Gloria Segal, who served in the Minnesota legislature. Like her mother, Susan is Jewish.

Legal offices
Preceded by Jill Flaskamp Halbrooks	Judge of the Minnesota Court of Appeals; 2019–present	Incumbent
Preceded by Edward J. Cleary	Chief Judge of the Minnesota Court of Appeals; 2020–present	Incumbent
