= Matthew Johnson (judge) =

American judge

Chief Judge of the Minnesota Court of Appeals
- In office November 1, 2010 – October 31, 2013
- Appointed by: Tim Pawlenty
- Preceded by: Edward Toussaint
- Succeeded by: Edward Cleary

Judge of the Minnesota Court of Appeals
- Incumbent
- Assumed office January 1, 2008
- Appointed by: Tim Pawlenty
- Preceded by: seat established

Personal details
- Born: February 10, 1963 (age 63) Sioux Falls, South Dakota
- Children: 3
- Education: St. Olaf College (B.A.); William Mitchell College of Law (J.D.)

Matthew E. Johnson (born February 10, 1963) is a judge of the Minnesota Court of Appeals. He previously served as its chief judge.

== Education ==
Johnson received his undergraduate degree from St. Olaf College in 1985 and his J.D. from William Mitchell College of Law in 1992, where he served as editor-in-chief of the William Mitchell Law Review.

== Career ==
After graduating, Johnson worked as a staff auditor for the Prudential Insurance Company in Minneapolis, and then as a staff assistant to the United States Senate Committee on the Judiciary. He spent the next two years as a judicial clerk, first for Charles R. Wolle of the United States District Court for the Southern District of Iowa and then for David R. Hansen of the United States Court of Appeals for the Eighth Circuit.

From 1994 to 2007, Johnson worked in private practice in Minneapolis, most recently with Halleland Lewis Nilan & Johnson.

== Judicial service ==
In 2007, Governor Tim Pawlenty appointed Johnson to a new seat on the Minnesota Court of Appeals, beginning January 1, 2008. Pawlenty later appointed him as chief judge, serving from November 1, 2010, to October 31, 2013.

Legal offices
Preceded by New seat	Judge of the Minnesota Court of Appeals; 2008–present	Succeeded by Incumbent
Preceded by Edward Toussaint	Chief Judge of the Minnesota Court of Appeals; 2010–2013	Succeeded by Edward Cleary
