= Walter F. Rogosheske =

American judge

Walter Frederick Rogosheske (July 12, 1914 – May 15, 1998) was an American jurist and politician.

Born in Sauk Rapids, Minnesota, Rogosheske attended Sauk Rapids High School, St. Cloud State University, and Valparaiso University. He received his bachelor's degree from the University of Minnesota in 1937 and his law degree from the University of Minnesota Law School. Rogesheske served in the United States Army during World War II. He served in the Minnesota House of Representatives from 1943 to 1949 as a Republican. Rogosheske moved to Little Falls, Minnesota, in 1950, when he was appointed a Minnesota District Court judge. He served on the Minnesota Supreme Court from 1962 to 1980.
