= Terri Stoneburner =

American judge

Judge of the Minnesota Court of Appeals
- In office April 28, 2000 – April 1, 2014
- Appointed by: Jesse Ventura
- Preceded by: Marianne Short
- Succeeded by: Peter Reyes

Judge of the Minnesota Fifth District Court
- In office April 1990 – April 28, 2000
- Appointed by: Rudy Perpich

Personal details
- Born: 1945 (age 80–81)
- Education: Hanover College (B.A.); University of Washington (J.D.)

Terri J. Stoneburner (born 1945) is an American lawyer and judge from the U.S. state of Minnesota. She is a former judge of the Minnesota Court of Appeals.

== Education and career ==
Stoneburner earned her undergraduate degree from Hanover College in 1967. She earned her J.D. from the University of Washington Law School in 1972.

Stoneburner worked as a staff attorney for the Alaska Commission for Human Rights from 1977 to 1979. She then worked as a professor of women's studies and political science at Minnesota State University, Mankato then called Mankato State University in Minnesota. Stoneburner also joined Farrish, Johnson, Maschka Attorneys at Law in Mankato, becoming a partner in 1984.

Stoneburner was appointed to the fifth district court by Rudy Perpich in April 1990. She was appointed to the Court of Appeals by Jesse Ventura in 2000. She retired on April 1, 2014.
