= Jeffrey Bryan =

American judge (born 1976)

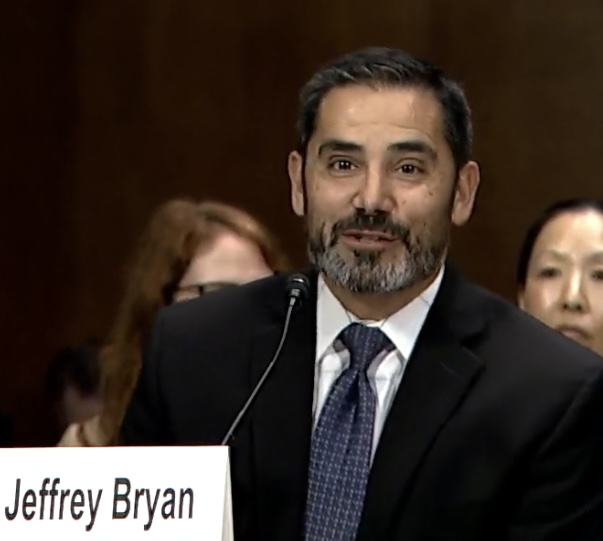

Judge of the United States District Court for the District of Minnesota
- Incumbent
- Assumed office November 30, 2023
- Appointed by: Joe Biden
- Preceded by: John R. Tunheim

Judge of the Minnesota Court of Appeals
- In office November 25, 2019 – November 30, 2023
- Appointed by: Tim Walz
- Preceded by: Heidi Schellhas
- Succeeded by: JaPaul Harris

Judge of the Second Judicial District of Minnesota
- In office August 20, 2013 – November 25, 2019
- Appointed by: Mark Dayton
- Preceded by: J. Thomas Mott
- Succeeded by: David Brown

Personal details
- Born: Jeffrey Marc Bryan; April 16, 1976 (age 50) Fayetteville, North Carolina, U.S.
- Education: University of Texas at Austin (BA); Yale University (JD)

Jeffrey Marc Bryan (born April 16, 1976) is an American lawyer and jurist who has served since 2023 as a United States district judge of the United States District Court for the District of Minnesota. From 2019 to 2023, he served as a judge of the Minnesota Court of Appeals, and from 2013 to 2019 as a judge of the District Court of Minnesota.

== Early life and education ==
Bryan was born on April 16, 1976, in Fayetteville, North Carolina, and grew up in El Paso, Texas. His mother's family is of Mexican descent. His mother was a high school English teacher and inspired Bryan to pursue a career in law after she read him the book To Kill a Mockingbird. Bryan earned his Bachelor of Arts, summa cum laude, from the University of Texas at Austin in 1998 and his Juris Doctor from Yale Law School in 2002.

== Career ==
Bryan was a law clerk for Judge Paul A. Magnuson of the United States District Court for the District of Minnesota from 2002 to 2003. From 2003 to 2007, he was a civil litigation attorney for Robins Kaplan LLP in Minneapolis, where he developed a litigation practice emphasizing antitrust law and intellectual property disputes. From 2007 to 2013, he served as an assistant United States attorney for the United States Attorney's Office, where he prosecuted financial fraud and drug-trafficking conspiracies.

=== State district court ===
On July 11, 2013, Governor Mark Dayton appointed Bryan as a trial court judge in the Ramsey County District Court to fill the vacancy left by J. Thomas Mott's retirement. He assumed office on August 20, 2013, and was elected in 2014. He co-chaired the Ramsey County Juvenile Detention Alternatives Initiative during his time on the trial court. In 2018 and 2020, Bryan was among four finalists for vacancies on the Minnesota Supreme Court.

=== Minnesota Court of Appeals ===
On October 9, 2019, Minnesota Governor Tim Walz appointed Bryan to be a judge of the Minnesota Court of Appeals. He filled the vacancy left by Heidi Schellhas. He served in an at-large capacity. He assumed office on November 25, 2019.

=== Federal judicial service ===
On June 23, 2023, Bryan was mentioned as a potential nominee the FBI was vetting for a vacancy on the United States District Court for the District of Minnesota. On July 27, President Joe Biden nominated Bryan to serve as a United States district judge of the United States District Court for the District of Minnesota. Biden nominated Bryan to the seat being vacated by Judge John R. Tunheim, who announced his intent to assume senior status upon confirmation of a successor. On September 6, a hearing on his nomination was held before the Senate Judiciary Committee. On September 28, his nomination was reported out of committee by a 13–8 vote. On November 27, the United States Senate invoked cloture on his nomination by a 47–42 vote. On November 28, his nomination was confirmed by a 49–46 vote. He received his judicial commission on November 30 and was sworn in on December 1. He is the first Latino federal judge in Minnesota.

== Personal life ==
Bryan married Liz Kramer on November 16, 2002. They met at Yale University. As of 2023, Kramer served as Solicitor General in Minnesota Attorney General Keith Ellison's office. Kramer is co-founder of the appeals self-help clinic at the Minnesota Judicial Center and in 2016 was named Minnesota Lawyer's Attorney of the Year.

As of 2013, Bryan was a member of the Minnesota Hispanic Bar Association. He previously served on the Macalester-Groveland Community Council and chaired the Minnesota Minority Recruiting Conference Committee for Twin Cities Diversity in Practice. He also serves on the Minnesota Task Force on Missing and Murdered Indigenous Women, the Minnesota Supreme Court Rules of Evidence Advisory Committee, and on the board of various community organizations, including the Minnesota Urban Debate League and Twin Cities Habitat for Humanity.

== See also ==
- List of Hispanic and Latino American jurists

Legal offices
Preceded by Heidi Schellhas	Judge of the Minnesota Court of Appeals; 2019–2023	Succeeded by JaPaul Harris
Preceded by John R. Tunheim	Judge of the United States District Court for the District of Minnesota; 2023–present	Incumbent
