= Edward Toussaint =

American judge

Judge of the Minnesota Court of Appeals
- In office November 1, 2010 – July 15, 2011

Chief Judge of the Minnesota Court of Appeals
- In office November 1, 1995 – October 31, 2010
- Appointed by: Arne Carlson
- Preceded by: Anne V. Simonett
- Succeeded by: Matthew E. Johnson

Hennepin County District Court Judge
- In office 1992–1995
- Appointed by: Arne Carlson

Personal details
- Born: October 7, 1941 (age 84)
- Education: DePaul University

Edward Toussaint, Jr. (born October 7, 1941) is an American lawyer and judge from Minnesota. For 16 years, from 1995 until July 2011, he served as a judge on the Minnesota Court of Appeals.

Toussaint was appointed Chief Judge of the Minnesota Court of Appeals in 1995 by Minnesota Governor Arne Carlson. He held the position until October 2010, when he stepped down as Chief Judge to take a seat on the court as an associate judge. He remained on the court until July 15, 2011, when he retired due to the state's mandatory retirement age.

Toussaint now serves as a professor of law at William Mitchell College of Law in Saint Paul. Before serving on the Court of Appeals, Toussaint served as a district judge in Hennepin County.

Legal offices
Preceded by Anne Simonett	Chief Judge of the Minnesota Court of Appeals; 1995–2010	Succeeded by Matthew E. Johnson
