= D.D. Wozniak =

American politician

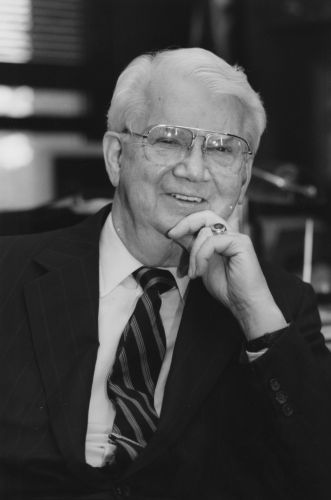

Chief Judge of the Minnesota Court of Appeals
- In office November 16, 1987 – August 31, 1992
- Appointed by: Rudy Perpich
- Preceded by: Peter S. Popovich
- Succeeded by: Paul H. Anderson

Judge of the Minnesota Court of Appeals
- In office November 2, 1983 – November 15, 1987
- Appointed by: Rudy Perpich
- Preceded by: Office Created
- Succeeded by: Thomas J. Kalitowski

Member of the Minnesota House of Representatives
- In office 1951–1965

Personal details
- Born: August 26, 1922 Silver Lake, Minnesota
- Died: August 17, 2005 (aged 82) St. Paul, MN
- Spouse: Angela Walsh
- Children: Victoria Morris Wozniak, Angela Wozniak Daniel Wozniak Jr., George Wozniak
- Education: University of St. Thomas; University of Minnesota

Daniel Donald "D.D." Wozniak Sr. (August 26, 1922 in Silver Lake, Minnesota – August 17, 2005) was a Minnesota lawyer, politician, and judge, who served as Chief Judge of the Minnesota Court of Appeals.

== Early life and education ==
Wozniak was born in Silver Lake, Minnesota and graduated from Central High School in Minneapolis, Minnesota. Wozniak served as a naval aviator during World War II. He graduated with a degree in economics from the University of St. Thomas in 1943, and received his law degree from the University of Minnesota in 1948. Wozniak was elected to the Minnesota House of Representatives in 1951, a position he would hold for 14 years. Described as a "maverick Democratic-Farmer-Labor Party activist," Wozniak would later serve in the foreign service for President Lyndon Johnson. Wozniak was appointed as one of the first judges on the newly created Minnesota Court of Appeals in 1982. He was later appointed Chief Judge in 1987. Wozniak held the position until 1992, when he resigned due to reaching the state's mandatory retirement age. Wozniak died in 2005.

Legal offices
Preceded by Peter S. Popovich	Chief Judge of the Minnesota Court of Appeals; 1987 - 1992	Succeeded by Paul H. Anderson
Preceded by Office Created	Judge of the Minnesota Court of Appeals; 1982 - 1987	Succeeded by Thomas J. Kalitowski
