= Larry Stauber =

American judge

United States Senator from Minnesota Court of Appeals
- In office 2008 – May 31, 2017
- Appointed by: Tim Pawlenty
- Preceded by: R.A. (Jim) Randall
- Succeeded by: James Florey

Personal details
- Born: 1947 (age 78–79) Duluth, Minnesota
- Children: 2

Lawrence "Larry" B. Stauber Jr. (born 1947) is a former judge on the Minnesota Court of Appeals. He was appointed to this position by Minnesota Governor Tim Pawlenty on June 24, 2008. Stauber was elected to the court in 2010 and again in 2016. He retired at the end of May 2017.

== Biography ==
Stauber received his B.A. and B.S. degrees from the University of Minnesota, Duluth in 1970 and his J.D. degree from the Chicago-Kent College of Law in 1977. He served in the U.S. Army from 1971 to 1974. Stauber was married until his wife's death in 2015, and has two adult children.

== Legal career ==
Stauber worked as a solo law practitioner in Duluth from 1977 to 1982. He also worked part-time as a public defender from 1978 to 2006. He was a partner and senior attorney of the general practice law firm Stauber and Lien from 1982 until his appointment to the Court of Appeals. He has also worked as a district court referee, a Minnesota Department of Transportation condemnation commissioner, and a Guardian ad Litem.

== Judicial career ==
Stauber was appointed to the Court of Appeals in 2008 by Governor Tim Pawlenty. In naming Stauber to the Court, Pawlenty cited Stauber's experience as a practicing attorney, and his desire to name people from a mix of legal backgrounds as Judges, commenting that, "in Larry's case, he's got three decades of legal experience, including appellate experience which will serve him well."

Stauber was then elected to the court in 2010, defeating Republican challenger Dan Griffith. In 2016, he ran unopposed for reelection. Stauber continued to serve on the Court until reaching Minnesota's mandatory retirement age (70) for judges.

After retirement, Stauber took the position of Senior Judge on Minnesota Court of Appeals and became an Adjunct/Affiliated Professor at the Mitchell Hamline School of Law. As a Senior Judge, Stauber continued to hear cases, including a controversial case concerning the Minneapolis Park and Recreation Board's renaming of Lake Calhoun to Bde Maka Ska.
