= Minnesota Journal of Law, Science & Technology =

- Discipline: Law review
- Language: English
- Edited by: Christhy Le

Publication details
- Former name: Minnesota Intellectual Property Review
- History: 2000-present
- Publisher: University of Minnesota Law School (United States)
- Frequency: Biannual

Standard abbreviations
- Bluebook: Minn. J. L. Sci. & Tech.
- ISO 4: Minn. J. Law Sci. Technol.

Indexing
- ISSN: 1552-9533 (print); 1552-9541 (web)
- LCCN: 2004213323
- OCLC no.: 56551103

Links
- Journal homepage

The Minnesota Journal of Law, Science & Technology is a biannual law review edited by students and faculty from the University of Minnesota. It was established in 2000 as the Minnesota Intellectual Property Review and covers issues in patents, trademarks, copyrights, bioethics, science, and technology as it relates to the law. Christhy Le is the editor-in-chief of Volume 26.

The journal is the 6th most cited Intellectual Property law journal, 5th most cited environmental and land use law journal, 3rd most cited health, medicine & psychology law journal, and 4th most cited science, technology, and computing law journal.
