= Kevin Burke (hurler) =

Irish hurler

Personal information
- Native name: Caoimhín de Búrca (Irish)
- Born: 2000 (age 25–26) Glasnevin, Dublin, Ireland
- Occupation: Student

Sport
- Sport: Hurling
- Position: Centre-back
Club
- Years: Club
- Na Fianna
Club titles
- Dublin titles: 0
College
- Years: College
- 2018-present: Dublin City University
College titles
- Fitzgibbon titles: 0
Inter-county*
Years	County	Apps (scores)
2020-present	Dublin	0 (0-00)
Inter-county titles
- Leinster titles: 0
- All-Irelands: 0
- NHL: 0
- All Stars: 0
- *Inter County team apps and scores correct as of 21:50, 5 July 2021.

Kevin Burke (born 2000) is an Irish hurler who plays for Dublin Senior Championship club Na Fianna and at inter-county level with the Dublin senior hurling team. He usually lines out as a centre-back.

== Career ==
A member of the Na Fianna club in Glasnevin, Burke first came to prominence at schools' level with the combined Dublin North team that won the Leinster Colleges Championship in 2018. He made his first appearance on the inter-county scene as a member of the Dublin minor team during the 2017 Leinster Championship, before later lining out at centre-back on the under-20 team that won the Leinster Championship title in 2020. Burke joined the Dublin senior hurling team in 2020.

== Career statistics ==
As of 3 July 2021

Team	Year	National League			Leinster		All-Ireland		Total	
Team	Year	Division	Apps	Score	Apps	Score	Apps	Score	Apps	Score
Dublin	2020	Division 1B	0	0-00	0	0-00	0	0-00	0	0-00
Dublin	2021	Division 1B	0	0-00	0	0-00	0	0-00	0	0-00
Career total			0	0-00	0	0-00	0	0-00	0	0-00

== Honours ==
Dublin North

- Leinster Colleges Senior Hurling Championship: 2018

Dublin

- Leinster Under-20 Hurling Championship: 2020 (c)
