= Minnesota Court of Appeals =

Appellate court in Minnesota, US

- Interactive map of Minnesota Court of Appeals
- 44°57′16″N 93°6′1″W
- Established: November 1, 1983
- Jurisdiction: Minnesota, United States
- Location: Saint Paul
- Coordinates: 44°57′16″N 93°6′1″W
- Composition method: Nonpartisan election, appointment by the governor if filling midterm vacancy
- Authorized by: Minnesota Constitution
- Appeals to: Minnesota Supreme Court
- Judge term length: 6 years (mandatory retirement at the age of 70)
- Number of positions: 19
- Website: Official website

Chief Judge
- Currently: Jennifer Frisch
- Since: December 31, 2024
- Lead position ends: December 31, 2027
- Jurist term ends: January 2, 2029

The Minnesota Court of Appeals is the intermediate appellate court in the U.S. state of Minnesota. It began operating on November 1, 1983.

== Jurisdiction ==
The Court of Appeals has jurisdiction over most appeals from the state trial courts, including the Minnesota District Courts, and from many decisions of state agencies and local governments. The only exceptions to this grant of jurisdiction are statewide election contests, first-degree murder cases, and appeals from the Minnesota Tax Court and Minnesota Workers' Compensation Court of Appeals, all of which go directly to the Minnesota Supreme Court.

The Minnesota Supreme Court has discretionary review. Only about five percent of Court of Appeals decisions are accepted by the Supreme Court for further review, meaning that the Court of Appeals makes the final ruling in the vast majority of the 2,000 to 2,400 appeals filed every year.

== Procedure ==
Under Minnesota law, the Court of Appeals must issue a decision within 90 days after oral arguments. If no oral argument is held, a decision is due within 90 days of the case's scheduled conference date. This deadline is the shortest imposed on any appellate court in the nation. The court expedites decisions on child custody cases, mental health commitments and other matters in which the parties request accelerated response.

== Composition ==
The 19 judges of the Minnesota Court of Appeals are elected to renewable six-year terms. When a midterm vacancy occurs, the governor appoints a replacement to a term that ends after the general election occurring more than one year after the appointment. All judges who have served on the court have been appointed by the governor. The chief judge is selected by the governor from the members of the court to serve a fixed three-year term.

Eight seats are associated with Minnesota's congressional districts. Judges for those seats must live in the associated district at the time of appointment or initial election. But seated judges remain eligible for those positions even if they later move to another district. Remaining seats are at-large positions that can be filled without regard to residency. The seats associated with congressional districts are redesignated every ten years following reapportionment of the districts. The most recent reapportionment occurred in 2022. The seats on the Court of Appeals were redesignated in January 2023.

Members sit in three-judge panels in various locations throughout the state to hear oral arguments, all of which are open to the public.

== Members ==
District (Note: All judges are elected statewide in nonpartisan elections. Eight seats are tied to Minnesota’s congressional districts, and candidates for those seats must reside in the associated district at the time of appointment or initial election. The remaining 11 seats have no residency requirement.)	Seat	Name	Start	Term ends	Appointer	Law school
4th	10	Jennifer Frisch, Chief Judge	May 4, 2020	January 2, 2029	Tim Walz (D)	Minnesota
1st	6	Renee Worke	June 9, 2005	January 6, 2031	Tim Pawlenty (R)	Mitchell
3rd	15	Kevin Ross	February 23, 2006	January 3, 2033	Tim Pawlenty (R)	Iowa
At-large	19	Francis Connolly	January 1, 2008	January 2, 2029	Tim Pawlenty (R)	Georgetown
At-large	17	Matthew Johnson	January 1, 2008	January 2, 2029	Tim Pawlenty (R)	Mitchell
At-large	16	Peter Reyes	April 7, 2014	January 2, 2029	Mark Dayton (D)	Mitchell
At-large	4	Tracy Smith	February 3, 2016	January 6, 2031	Mark Dayton (D)	Minnesota
At-large	12	Diane Bratvold	March 24, 2016	January 6, 2031	Mark Dayton (D)	Minnesota
At-large	13	Jeanne Cochran	November 7, 2018	January 3, 2033	Mark Dayton (D)	Minnesota
2nd	3	Sarah Wheelock	December 1, 2021	January 6, 2031	Tim Walz (D)	Iowa
8th	14	Elise Larson	July 1, 2022	January 6, 2031	Tim Walz (D)	Minnesota
At-large	2	Jon Schmidt	September 5, 2023	January 6, 2031	Tim Walz (D)	Mitchell
At-large	8	Keala Ede	September 11, 2023	January 6, 2031	Tim Walz (D)	Berkeley
At-large	18	JaPaul Harris	March 18, 2024	January 3, 2033	Tim Walz (D)	Hamline
At-large	1	Elizabeth Bentley	August 1, 2024	January 3, 2033	Tim Walz (D)	Harvard
5th	7	Rachel Bond	January 3, 2025	January 3, 2033	Tim Walz (D)	Boston
At-large	5	Lisa Beane	January 26, 2026	January 2, 2029	Tim Walz (D)	Minnesota
7th	9	Anne Rasmusson	February 17, 2026	January 2, 2029	Tim Walz (D)	Minnesota
6th	11	John A. Bowen	October 12, 2026	January 2, 2029	Tim Walz (D)	Mitchell

=== Chief judges ===
- Peter Popovich (1983–1987)
- D.D. Wozniak (1987–1992)
- Paul Anderson (1992–1994)
- Anne Simonett (1994–1995)
- Edward Toussaint (1995–2010)
- Matthew Johnson (2010–2013)
- Edward Cleary (2013–2020)
- Susan Segal (2020–24)
- Jennifer Frisch (2024-present)

=== Former judges ===
- Barry Anderson
- Paul Anderson
- Jeffrey Bryan
- Margaret Chutich
- Theodora Gaïtas
- Sam Hanson
- Natalie Hudson
- David Minge
- Fred Norton
- Randolph W. Peterson
- Peter Popovich
- Robert A. Randall
- John Rodenberg
- Larry Stauber
- Terri Stoneburner
- Edward Toussaint
- Wilhelmina Wright
