= District Court of Minnesota =

State trial court

- Established: May 8, 1858
- Jurisdiction: Minnesota
- Location: Minnesota Judicial Center; Saint Paul
- Composition method: Nonpartisan election, appointment by the governor if filling midterm vacancy
- Authorised by: Minnesota Constitution
- Appeals to: Minnesota Court of Appeals
- Judge term length: 6 years (mandatory retirement at the age of 70)

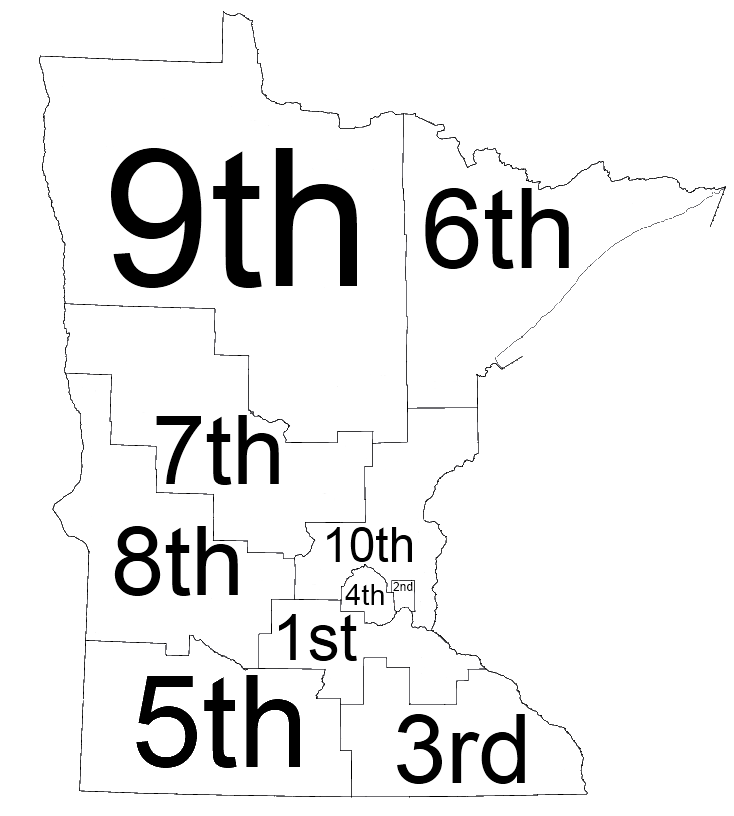
Judicial district map

The District Court of Minnesota is the state trial court of general jurisdiction in the U.S. state of Minnesota.

== Jurisdiction of the court ==
The Minnesota Constitution provides that the district court has original jurisdiction in civil and criminal cases and such appellate jurisdiction as may be prescribed by law. Appeals from these courts usually go to the Minnesota Court of Appeals.

Minnesota Court Rule 146 creates a Complex Case Program (CCP) in the district courts, assigning complex cases to a single judge from beginning to end. Per Rule 146.01, the CCP's objective is promoting "effective and efficient judicial management of complex cases in the district courts, avoid unnecessary burdens on the court, keep costs reasonable for the litigants and to promote effective decision making by the court, the parties and counsel." In addition to the single assigned judge highly involved in case management throughout the litigation process, the CCP's core principles involve mandatory disclosures of information, setting firm trial dates, and requiring judicial and staff education and training in complex case management.

A number of district courts have expedited civil litigation track programs, sometimes referred to as the "rocket docket". These include district courts in Dakota and St. Louis Counties (since 2013), Hennepin and Olmstead Counties (since 2016), and the entirety of the Sixth Judicial District (since 2019). The rocket docket is typified by early judicial involvement, limited discovery, curtailed continuances, and the setting early trial dates. The program is mandatory, but assigned parties can seek to opt out. The first two pilot project judges were Jerome B. Abrams in Dakota County and Eric Hylden in St. Louis County. In May 2024, the Supreme Court expanded the rocket docket program statewide, giving all judicial districts without the docket an opportunity to opt-in to the program.

== Structure of the court ==
It is common to refer to the "district courts" in the plural, as if each court in each judicial district is a separate court; this is the usage found in Chapter 484 of the Minnesota Statutes, which governs the jurisdiction, powers, procedure, organization, and operations of the district court. However, the Minnesota Constitution only refers to "a district court" in the singular (as a single statewide court). As the Court of Appeals has recognized, "Minnesota trial benches were consolidated into a single district court."

In 2019 there were 289 judges of the district court in Minnesota. They are assigned to geographic districts. Each district has three or more judges, who are elected by the voters of the district in nonpartisan judicial elections to six-year terms. Candidates file for a specific judgeship by seat number. Vacancies are filled by appointment of the governor. The chief judge and assistant chief judge of each district are elected from judges of that district to exercise general administrative authority over the courts of the district. The chief justice of the Minnesota Supreme Court has the power to assign judges from one district to serve in another.

There are ten judicial districts, each comprising one or more of Minnesota's 87 counties:

List of District Court of Minnesota judicial districts
#	Counties served
First Judicial District	Carver, Dakota, Goodhue, Le Sueur, McLeod, Scott and Sibley counties.
Second Judicial District	Ramsey County.
Third Judicial District	Dodge, Fillmore, Freeborn, Houston, Mower, Olmsted, Rice, Steele, Wabasha, Waseca and Winona counties.
Fourth Judicial District	Hennepin County.
Fifth Judicial District	Blue Earth, Brown, Cottonwood, Faribault, Jackson, Lincoln, Lyon, Martin, Murray, Nicollet, Nobles, Pipestone, Redwood, Rock and Watonwan counties.
Sixth Judicial District	Carlton, Cook, Lake and St. Louis counties.
Seventh Judicial District	Becker, Benton, Clay, Douglas, Mille Lacs, Morrison, Otter Tail, Stearns, Todd and Wadena counties.
Eighth Judicial District	Big Stone, Chippewa, Grant, Kandiyohi, Lac qui Parle, Meeker, Pope, Renville, Stevens, Swift, Traverse, Wilkin, Yellow Medicine counties.
Ninth Judicial District	Aitkin, Beltrami, Cass, Clearwater, Crow Wing, Hubbard, Itasca, Kittson, Koochiching, Lake of the Woods, Mahnomen, Marshall, Norman, Pennington, Polk, Red Lake and Roseau counties.
Tenth Judicial District	Anoka, Chisago, Isanti, Kanabec, Pine, Sherburne, Washington and Wright counties.
