= University of Minnesota Law School =

Public law school in Minneapolis, Minnesota, US

- Established: 1888
- School type: Public law school
- Parent endowment: $5.4 billion (2022) (system-wide)
- Dean: William McGeveran
- Location: Minneapolis, Minnesota, U.S. 44°58′23″N 93°14′40″W
- Enrollment: 704 (spring 2022)
- Faculty: 31 (full-time, fall 2021)
- USNWR ranking: 22nd (tie) (2026)
- Bar pass rate: 97% (Minnesota, July 2022)
- Website: law.umn.edu

The University of Minnesota Law School is the law school of the University of Minnesota, a public university in Minneapolis, Minnesota. The school confers four law degrees: a Juris Doctor (J.D.), a Master of Laws (LL.M.), a Master of Science in Patent Law (M.S.P.L.), and a Doctor of Juridical Science (S.J.D.). The J.D. program offers a number of concentration opportunities, as well as dual and joint degree options with other graduate and professional schools of the university.

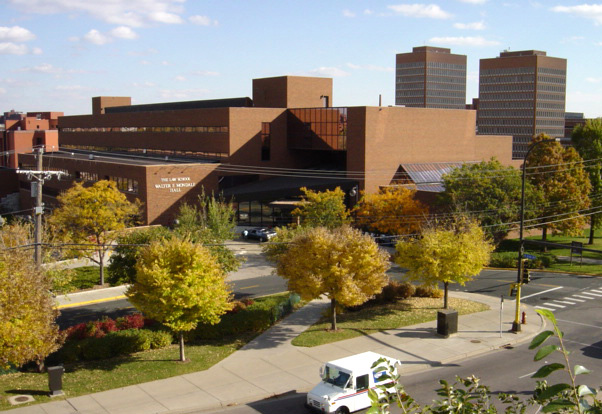
Walter F. Mondale Hall, home of the law school on the University of Minnesota's West Bank Campus

== History ==
The school was originally housed in Pattee Hall, named after the school's first dean, William S. Pattee, who served from 1888 to 1911. Pattee's personal books became the law library's first collection. In 1928 the school moved to Fraser Hall, named after Prof. Everett Fraser who served as dean from 1920 to 1948. In 1978 the school moved to its present building, originally named the Law Center. In 1999–2001, the law school initiated and completed an expansion of its facilities on the west bank of the university campus. This larger building was renamed Walter F. Mondale Hall in honor of one of its most distinguished alumni, former vice president Walter Mondale ('56).

Along with Harvard Law School, the University of Minnesota Law School founded the Center for Computer-Assisted Legal Instruction (CALI) in 1982. CALI has grown to include the membership of nearly every law school in the US and the organization still has offices at the University of Minnesota Law School.

The law school has 704 professional students and most of them are members of the J.D. program,; the school maintains a 8:1 student-to-faculty ratio. Admission to the law school is selective. Half of the incoming Class of 2028 had a GPA above 3.88 and/or an LSAT score above 171. The five-year average bar exam passage rate was 96.91%.

The law school's 12th dean is Professor William McGeveran, formerly Minnesota Law’s interim dean for the 2023-24 academic year and a professor with more than 18 years of experience as a faculty member at the Law School.

== Cost of attendance; employment ==
Tuition for the 2020–2021 academic year are $43,704 for residents and $52,560 for non-residents. Over 95% of the students receive financial aid, including scholarships, to help fund their legal education. Law School scholarships are awarded at the time of admission and range from $5,000 to full tuition. The median starting salary for the 2015 graduates entering the private sector was over $115,000, with 93% of the Class of 2015 known to be employed as of March 2016. The most popular destinations for the 2015 graduates were California, Minnesota, New York, Washington, D.C., and Wisconsin.

== U.S. Supreme Court clerkships ==
The law school ranked in the top 20 of law schools whose graduates secured U.S. Supreme Court clerkships in recent years. They include Kyle D. Hawkins (Class of 2009), who clerked for Justice Samuel Alito in the 2013 Term, and Amy L. Bergquist (Class of 2007), who clerked for Justice Ruth Bader Ginsburg in the 2010 Term.

== Experiential learning ==
There are 24 nationally recognized legal education clinics, offering "student attorneys" the opportunity to handle real legal cases under the supervision of teaching attorneys, with over 50 percent of law students participating in at least one clinic program, which is twice the national average. In 2015, the law school's faculty and students, working in the Center for New Americans, took a case all the way up to the U.S. Supreme Court and won a landmark decision that changed the law in the area of immigration.

Over 95 percent of second-year J.D. students participate in either a moot court or legal journal, such as the Minnesota Law Review. According to the prestigious law journal rankings recently released by Washington and Lee University School of Law, the Minnesota Law Review, currently celebrating its 100th volume, ranks 9th among all law reviews. Two journals were ranked at the very top in their subject areas: Law and Inequality (JLI) for family law and the Minnesota Journal of Law, Science & Technology (MJLST) for energy law.

JLI has been the highest-ranked family law journal for four straight years. It also ranked 3rd in minority, race and ethnic issues, 7th in gender, women, and sexuality, and 20th in public policy, politics, and the law.

MJLST has been the highest-ranked energy law journal for eight consecutive years. MJLST was also ranked 3rd in health law, 4th in environmental, natural resources, and land use, 8th in science, technology, and computing, and 10th in intellectual property.

The Minnesota Journal of International Law ranked 16th among all international law journals, moving up from 23rd in 2014. The ABA Journal of Labor & Employment Law is now ranked 4th for employment law. The law school's faculty-edited journal, Constitutional Commentary, was ranked 2nd in legal history and 9th in constitutional law.

The school's students have won the prestigious Burton Award for Legal Achievement nine times, making the law school one of only seven schools to have received these distinguished writing awards eight or more times.

== Prominent faculty ==
The school was ranked 15th among U.S. law schools, tied with the University of Michigan Law School, for the number of times its tenured faculty's published scholarship was cited in legal journals during the period 2010 through 2014. In addition, several of the school's recent past deans have gone on to college or university presidencies, including the eighth Dean Tom Sullivan, who went on the serve as president of the University of Vermont (2012-19), the tenth Dean David Wippman, who went on to serve as president of Hamilton College (2016-2024), and the eleventh Dean Garry Jenkins, who went on to serve as president of Bates College (2023-present).

== Law Library ==
The Law Library, with over 1 million volumes, is the 7th largest of its kind in the United States. The Riesenfeld Rare Books Research Center houses one of the top three collections of rare legal texts in the nation. For its millionth volume, the law school acquired the papers of Clarence Darrow.

== Study abroad programs ==
The law school offers a number of study abroad opportunities and, in 2006 opened a summer study program for J.D. students in Beijing. The program was originally conducted with the China University of Political Science and Law, and after two years it was changed to Renmin University (People's University) in Beijing.

The school also features semester exchange programs with ESADE Faculty of Law in Barcelona, Spain; University of Uppsala, Uppsala, Sweden; Université Jean Moulin (Lyon III) in Lyon, France, Humboldt University in Berlin, Germany; University College Dublin in Dublin, Ireland, Tilburg University Faculty of Law in Tilburg, Netherlands, Bocconi University in Milan, Italy; and Bucerius Law School in Hamburg, Germany. In Fall 2006, the law school announced a new exchange partnership with the Universidad de Montevideo in Montevideo, Uruguay.

== Student life ==
=== Musical ===
An annual highlight for the law school is when the student body puts on its own full-length musical: written, performed, directed and produced by the all-student Theatre of the Relatively Talentless (T.O.R.T.). Begun in 2002, the event draws over a thousand audience members each year and features cameos by distinguished alumni and other distinguished members of the Minnesota legal community. For the 2006 show, "West Bank Story" (a spoof on "West Side Story"), tickets sold out within three days. Previous shows include: "The Wizard of Fritz" (2003); "Law Wars" (2004); "Walter Wonka and the Lawyer Factory" (2005); "West Bank Story" (2006); "Frankenlaw" (2007); "Robin Hood, Esq." (2008); "It's a Wonderful Law School" (2009); "A Midsemester Night's Dream" (2010); "Harry Torter and the Magical Law School" (2011); "Alawddin: The Tale of 1001 All-Nighters" (2012); "Back to the Future Interest" (2013); "Clue: A Murder Mystery in Mondale" (2014); "Froze-In" (2015); "Minnesota Jones and the Law School of Doom" (2016); "The T.O.R.T. Producers" (2017); and "Top Gunner" (2018). T.O.R.T. performed "Tale as Old as Time" March 29 and 30, 2019, at the Pantages Theater in downtown Minneapolis. T.O.R.T.'s production of "Lord of the Ranks" was cancelled after COVID-19 made a show impossible. In 2021, T.O.R.T.'s production of "Super Smash Gophers(SSG)" was filmed at the St. Paul Campus Auditorium and screened in Northeast Minneapolis. Participants are known as the TORTfeasors.

=== Hockey ===
The Fighting Mondales hit the ice during the season in intramural play, club play and rivalry games. In the fall, the Fighting Mondales participate in the University of Minnesota's intramural season, often playing their games at Mariucci Arena on the U of M campus. The Fighting Mondales also square off against the hockey teams of the other Midwestern law schools including North Dakota Law School, the Mitchell Hamline Fighting Eelpouts, and the University of St. Thomas Fightin’ Apostles. In the spring, the Mondales, Eelpouts, and Apostles battle in an annual competition for the coveted Golden Gavel, awarded to the best Twin Cities law school hockey club. The Mondales most recently won the Gavel in 2025, defeating the Fighting Apostles 3-1. The trophy currently resides in Mondale Hall.

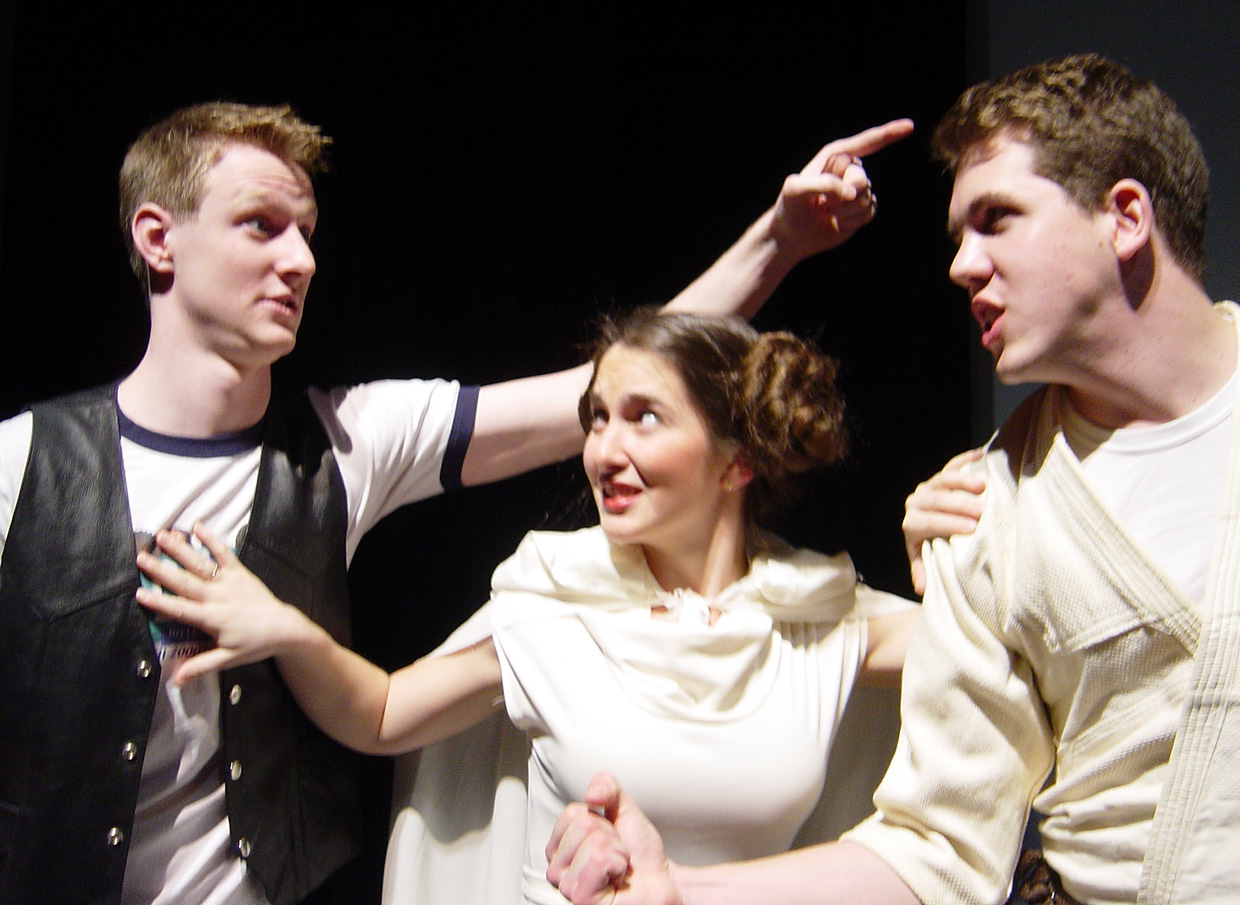
Scene from TORT's 2004 production of "Law Wars"

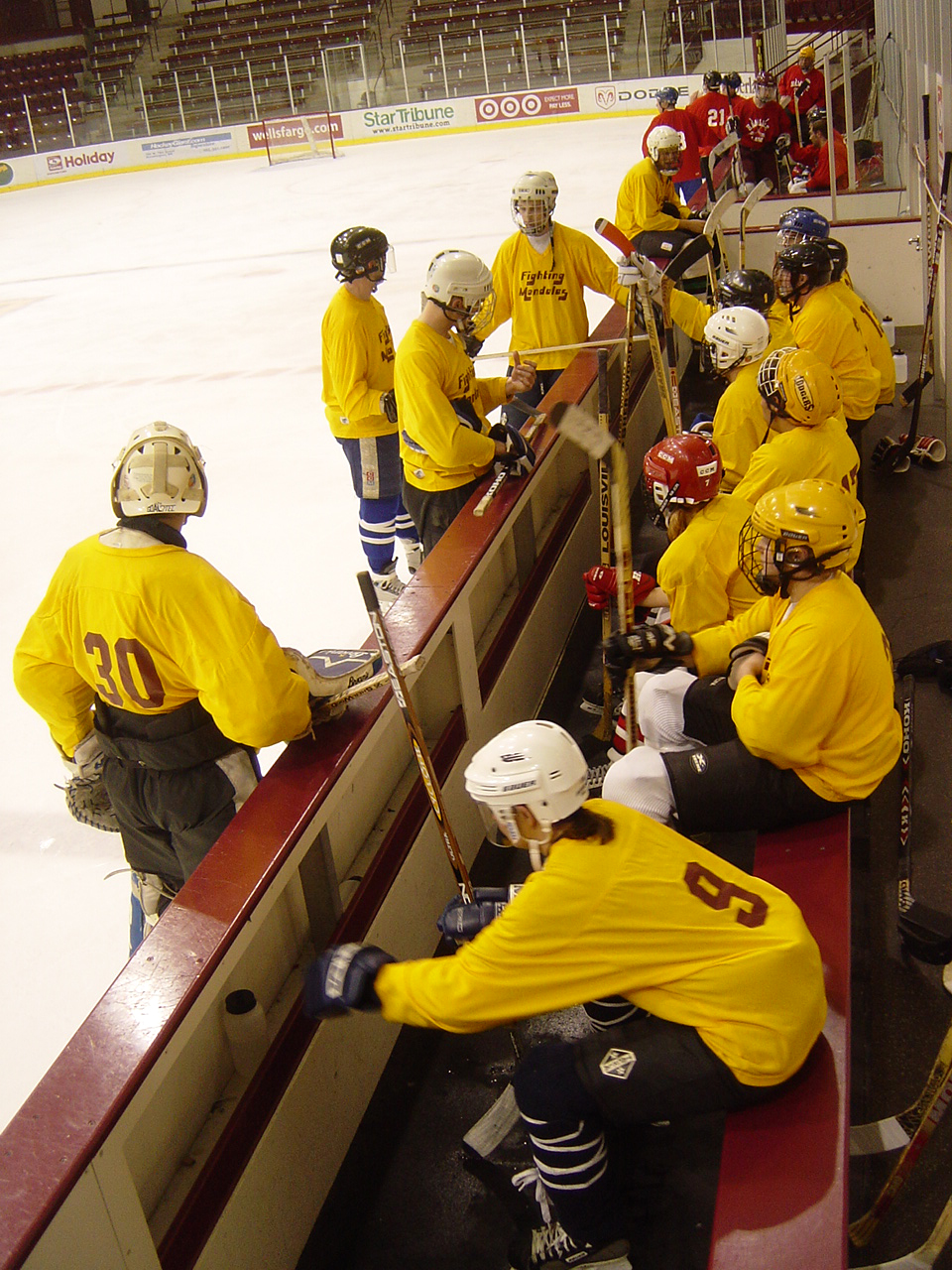
The Fighting Mondales bench during a game against Hamline University

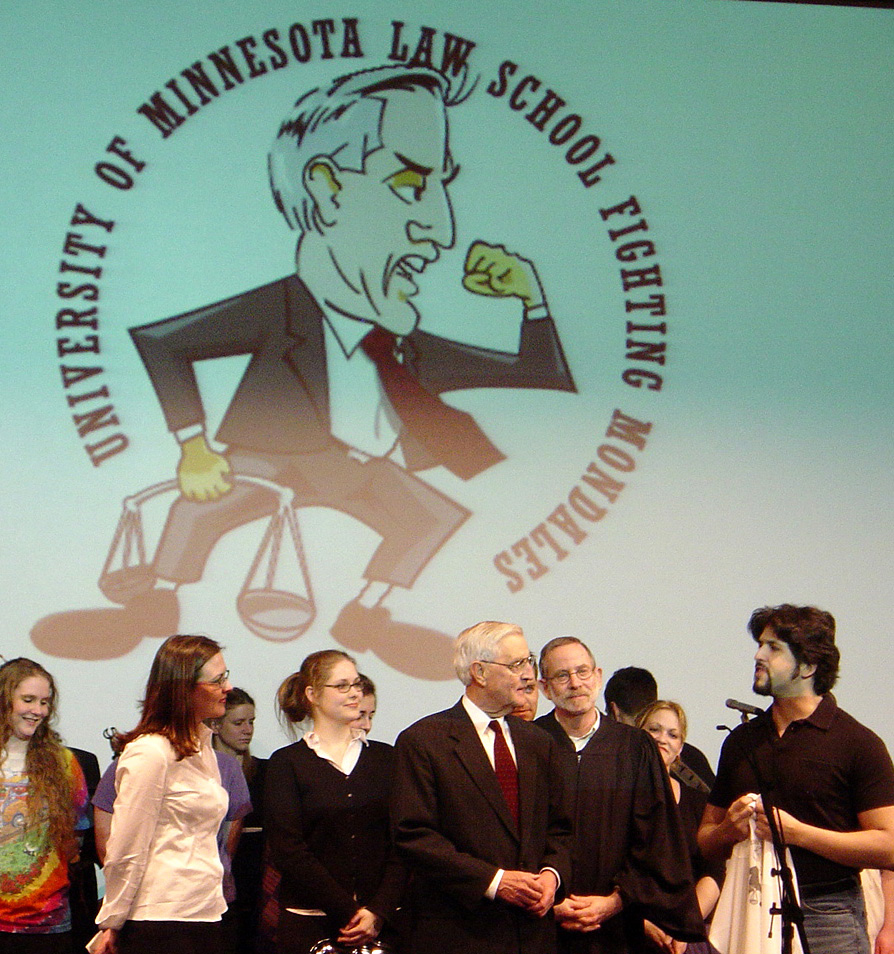
Walter Mondale at the introduction of the "Fighting Mondales"

== Notable alumni ==
The law school has about 13,000 living alumni in 50 states and 70 countries, including 275 serving as federal and state court judges nationwide. Perhaps the most famous alumnus of the law school is former Vice President of the United States and U.S. Ambassador to Japan Walter Mondale ('56). The law school's building was renamed Walter F. Mondale Hall in his honor in 2002. His legacy and continued participation in the life of the school earned him a most interesting honor from the school's student-run Law Council: the naming of the mascot of the law school as the "Fighting Mondales." The Law School held the office of Attorney General of Minnesota uninterrupted from another law school from 1929 until 2007.
