= List of first women lawyers and judges in Minnesota =

This is a list of the first women lawyer(s) and judge(s) in Minnesota. It includes the year in which the women were admitted to practice law (in parentheses). Also included are women who achieved other distinctions such becoming the first in their state to graduate from law school or become a political figure.

== Firsts in state history ==
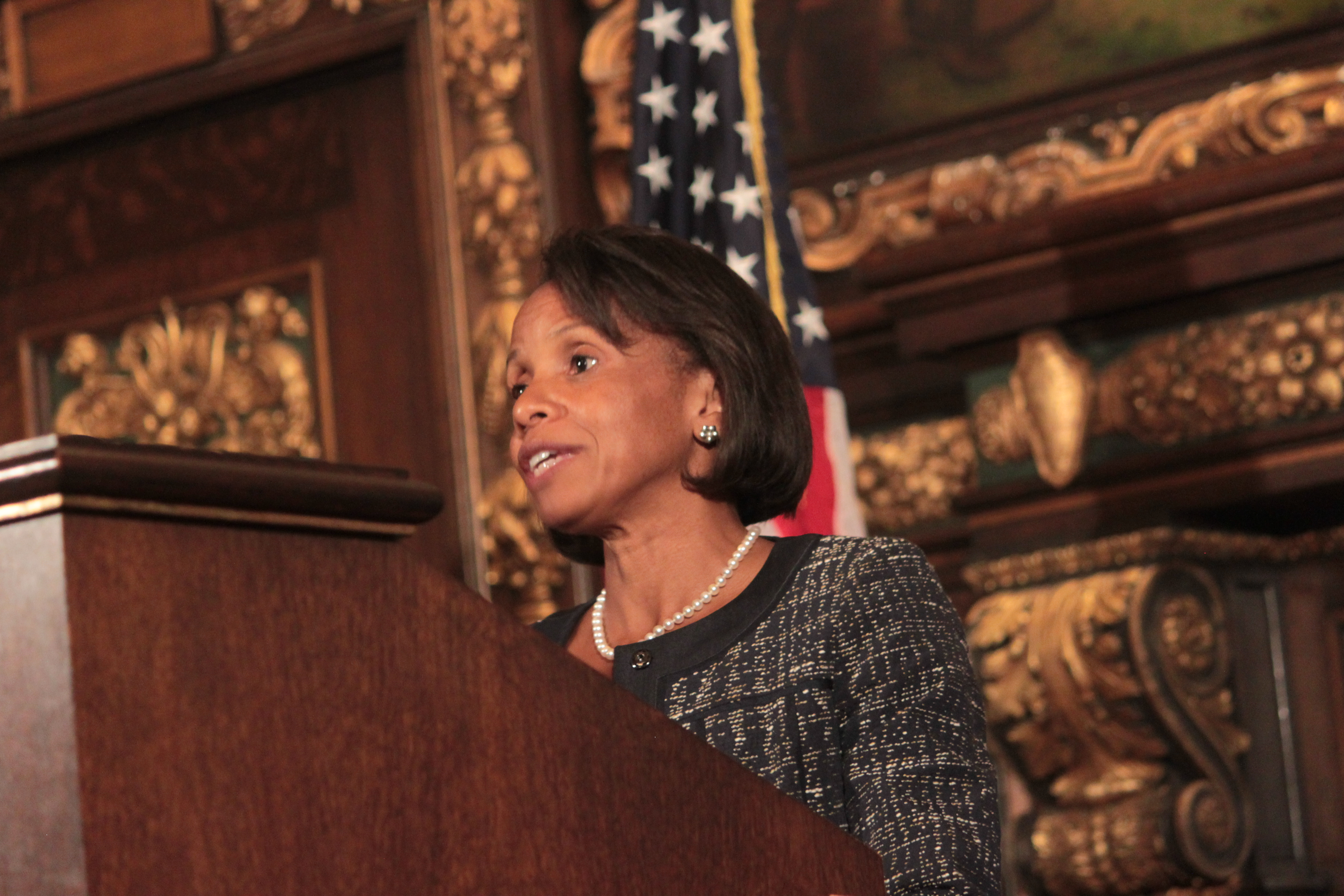
Wilhelmina Wright: First African American female Justice of the Minnesota Supreme Court (2012)

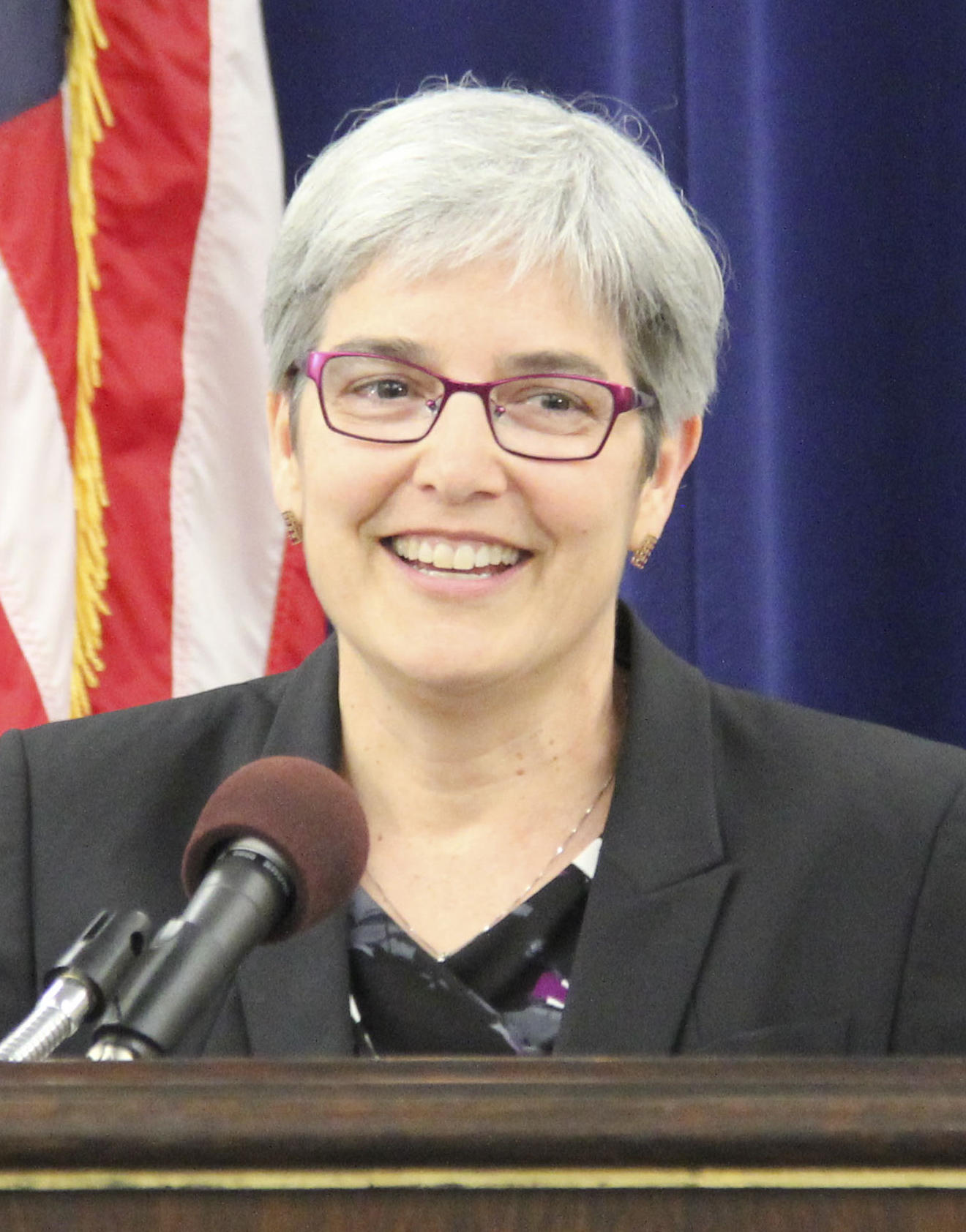
Margaret Chutich: First openly lesbian Justice of the Minnesota Supreme Court (2016)

=== Law School ===
- Maureen Onyelobi: First (African American) female to take a law school test while incarcerated in Minnesota (2021)

=== Lawyers ===
- Martha Angle Dorsett (1878): First female lawyer in Minnesota. Admitted to the Hennepin County bar.
- Mary L. McGindley (1891): First woman admitted to the Minnesota bar.
- Lena O. Smith (1921): First African American female lawyer in Minnesota
- Margaret Treuer (1977): First Native American (Ojibwe) (female) lawyer in Minnesota. She would later become a tribal judge.
- Lenor Scheffler (1988): First Mdewakanton (female) lawyer in Minnesota
- Kao Ly Ilean Her and Pacyinz Lyfoung (1994): First Hmong American female lawyers in Minnesota
- Lola Velazquez-Aguilu: First Latino American female to serve as the Chair of the Minnesota Commission on Judicial Selection
- Amran Farah (2013): Reputed to be the first Somali American (female) to make partner at a major Minnesota law firm (2020)

=== Law clerk ===
- Joyce A. Hughes: First African American (female) law clerk for a federal Minnesota court (1965)

=== State judges ===
- Eleanor Nolan: First female to briefly serve as a municipal court judge in Minnesota (1940)
- Betty Whitlock Washburn: First female judge in Minnesota (1950)
- Ruth Brown, LeSueur County Court
- Gail Murray, St. Louis County Court
- Susanne C. Sedgwick: First female to serve on a Minnesota trial court, Hennepin County District Court (1974) second woman to serve as a municipal judge (1970) defeating an incumbent, and one of the first women to serve on the newly-created Minnesota Court of Appeals (1983)
- Rosalie E. Wahl: First female to serve on the Minnesota Supreme Court (1977)
- Harriet Lansing, Ramsey County Municipal Court (1978), one of first two women on the newly-created Minnesota Court of Appeals (1983)
- Pamela Alexander: First African American female judge in Minnesota (1983)
- Isabel Gomez: First Hispanic American female judge in Minnesota (1984)
- Joanne M. Smith was the first woman elected chief judge of a district court in Minnesota (1989). Governor Perpich appointed Joanne Smith as a second judicial district judge on November 10, 1983.
- Linda S. Titus (1978): First female to serve on the Fifth Judicial District in Minnesota (1990)
- Leslie Metzen (1979): First female to serve on the First Judicial District in Minnesota
- Natalie Hudson: First African American female to serve on the Minnesota Court of Appeals (2002)
- Regina Chu: First Asian American female judge in Minnesota (2002)
- Susan N. Burke: First Japanese American (female) judge in Minnesota (2004)
- Wilhelmina Wright (1998): First African American female to serve on the Minnesota Supreme Court (2012)
- Margaret Chutich (1984): First openly LGBT female to serve on the Minnesota Supreme Court (2016)
- Anne McKeig (1992): First Native American (Ojibwe) [female] to serve on the Minnesota Supreme Court (2016)
- Sophia Vuelo (1999): First Hmong American female judge in Minnesota (2017)
- Sarah Wheelock: First Native American (Meskwaki Nation female) to serve on the Minnesota Court of Appeals (2021)
- Natalie Hudson: First African American (female) to serve as the Chief Justice of the Minnesota Supreme Court (2023)
- Viet-Hanh Winchell: First Vietnamese American (female) judge in Minnesota (2024)

=== Federal judges ===
- Margaret Treuer (1977): First Native American (Ojibwe) female to serve as a U.S. Magistrate for the United States District Court for the District of Minnesota (1983)
- Margaret A. Mahoney: First female to serve on the U.S. Bankruptcy Court in Minnesota (1984)
- Diana E. Murphy: First female federal judge in Minnesota (1994)
- Kesha Tanabe: First Asian American (female) to serve as a federal judge in Minnesota (2022)

=== Attorney General ===
- Lori Swanson: First female Attorney General of Minnesota (2007)

=== Assistant Attorney General ===
- Nilushi Ranaweera: First Sri Lankan American female to serve as an Assistant Attorney General of Minnesota (2019)

=== Deputy Attorney General ===
- Luz María Frías: First Latino American female to serve as the Deputy Attorney General of Minnesota

=== Solicitor General ===
- Cathy Haukedahl (1979): First female Solicitor General of Minnesota

=== United States Attorney ===
- Rachel Paulose (1997): First Indian American female to serve as the U.S. Attorney for the District of Minnesota (2006)

=== County Attorney ===
- Mary P. Walbran (1937): First female to serve as a County Attorney in Minnesota (1943)
- Helen Hill Bianz and Susan Grimsley: First females elected as County Attorneys in Minnesota (1977-1978)

=== Assistant County Attorney ===
- Phyllis Jean Jones: First female to serve as an Assistant County Attorney in Minnesota

=== Bar Association ===
- Helen Kelly: First female to serve as the President of the Minnesota State Bar Association (1987-1988)
- Sonia Miller-Van Oort: First Hispanic American female (and Hispanic American in general) to serve as the President of the Minnesota State Bar Association (2017)
- Luz Maria Frias: First female to serve as the President of the Minnesota Hispanic Bar Association
- Adine Momoh: First minority female to serve as the President of the Hennepin County Bar Association, Minnesota (2018)

== Firsts in local history ==
- Gail Murray: First female judge in Northern Minnesota (1967)
- Flora E. Matteson, Marie A. McDermott, Nora L. Morton: First females to graduate from the University of Minnesota Law School (1893) [Hennepin and Ramsey Counties, Minnesota]
- Kaoly Lyfoung: First Hmong American female to earn a law degree from the University of Minnesota [Hennepin and Ramsey Counties, Minnesota]
- Joyce Anne Hughes: First African American female to earn a law degree from the University of Minnesota (1965). In 1971, she became the first African American (female) professor at the same school. [Hennepin and Ramsey Counties, Minnesota]
- Elizabeth A. Hayden (1979): First female judge north of Anoka County, Minnesota (1986)
- Charlotte Farrish: First female attorney in Mankato [which is located in Blue Earth, Le Sueur, and Nicollet Counties, Minnesota]
- Leslie Beiers: First female to serve on the Carlton County Sixth Judicial District (2014)
- Leslie Metzen (1979): First female judge in Dakota County, Minnesota (1986)
- Susan Grimsley: First female elected as County Attorney in Dodge County, Minnesota (c. 1977/1978)
- Tori Stewart: First female judge in Goodhue County, Minnesota (upon her appointment to the First Judicial District in 2023)
- Betty Whitlock Washburn: First female judge in Hennepin County, Minnesota (1950)
- LaJune Johnson-Lange: First African American female to serve as an Assistant Public Defender in Hennepin County, Minnesota (1978)
- Helen Kelly: First female to serve as the President of the Hennepin County Bar Association (1981)
- Pamela Alexander: First African American (female) prosecutor and judge in Hennepin County, Minnesota (1983)
- Amy Klobuchar: First female elected as the County Attorney for Hennepin County, Minnesota (1999)
- Mary Moriarty: First female to serve as the Chief Public Defender for Hennepin County, Minnesota (2014)
- Adine Momoh: First minority female to serve as the President of the Hennepin County Bar Association, Minnesota (2018)
- Helen Hill Bianz: First female elected as County Attorney in Itasco County, Minnesota (c. 1977/1978)
- Phyllis Jean Jones: First female to serve as an Assistant County Attorney in Ramsey County, Minnesota
- Harriet Lansing (1970): First female judge in Ramsey County, Minnesota (1978)
- Mimi Wright: First African American (female) judge in Ramsey County, Minnesota (2000)
- Gail Chang Bohr (c. 1991): First Asian American (female) judge in Ramsey County, Minnesota (2009)
- Monica Dooner Lindgren: First Latino American female to serve as the President for the Ramsey County Bar Association (2021)
- R. Kathleen Morris: First female to serve as the County Attorney for Scott County, Minnesota
- Elizabeth A. Hayden (1979): First female judge in Stearns County, Minnesota
- Virginia Marso (1978): First female lawyer in St. Cloud, Stearns County, Minnesota
- Janelle P. Kendall (1990): First female County Attorney in Stearns County, Minnesota
- Mary P. Walbran (1937): First female lawyer in Steele County, Minnesota
- Juanita Freeman: First African American female (and African American in general) to serve on the Tenth Judicial District in Washington County, Minnesota (2018)
- Karin Sonneman: First female to serve as the County Attorney for Winona County, Minnesota (2010)

== See also ==
- List of first women lawyers and judges in the United States
- Timeline of women lawyers in the United States
- Women in law

== Other topics of interest ==
- List of first minority male lawyers and judges in the United States
- List of first minority male lawyers and judges in Minnesota
