= List of first minority male lawyers and judges in Minnesota =

This is a list of the first minority male lawyer(s) and judge(s) in Minnesota. It includes the year in which the men were admitted to practice law (in parentheses). Also included are the men who achieved other distinctions such becoming the first in their state to graduate from law school or become a political figure.

== Firsts in state history ==
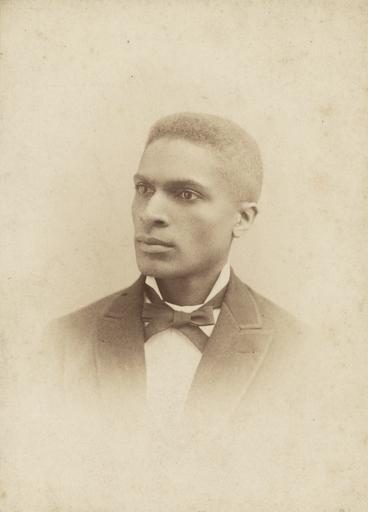
Fredrick McGhee: First African American male lawyer in Minnesota (1889)

Alan Page: First African American male Justice of the Minnesota Supreme Court (1993)

=== Law Degree ===
- First Somali American male: Hassan Ali Mohamud in 2002

=== Lawyers ===
- Jacob Jackson Noah (1851): First Jewish American male lawyer in Minnesota
- Fredrick McGhee (1889): First African American male lawyer in Minnesota
- William F. Campbell (1890s): First Native American male (Chippewa) lawyer in Minnesota
- Raul O. Salazar (1962): First Latino American male lawyer in Minnesota

=== State judges ===
- Charles Bechhoefer: First Jewish American male judge in Minnesota (1923)
- James J. Irving: First Native American (Sioux) male judicial officer in Minnesota (c. 1924)
- L. Howard Bennett: First African American male judge in Minnesota (1957)
- Stephen L. Maxwell (1953): First African American male to serve as a district court judge in Minnesota (1968)
- Alberto Miera, Jr.: First Hispanic American male judge in Minnesota (1983)
- Alan Page (1978): First African American male to serve on the Minnesota Supreme Court (1993)
- Tony N. Leung: First Asian American male judge in Minnesota (1994)
- Robert A. Blaeser (1979): First Native American (Anishinaabe from the White Earth Band of Ojibwe) male judge in Minnesota (1995)
- Edward Toussaint: First African American male to serve on the Minnesota Court of Appeals (1995)
- David Stras: First Jewish American male to serve on the Minnesota Supreme Court (2010)
- Peter Reyes Jr. (1997): First Hispanic American male to serve on the Minnesota Court of Appeals (2014)
- David Stras: First Jewish American male to serve on the Minnesota Supreme Court (2010)
- Leonardo Castro: First Hispanic American male to serve as a chief judge in a judicial district in Minnesota (2020)
- Keala Ede: First Native Hawaiian male judge in Minnesota (upon his appointment to the Minnesota District Court in 2022)
- Karl Procaccini: First Muslim American male to serve as a Justice of the Minnesota Supreme Court (2023)
- Reynaldo Aligada, Jr.: First Asian American male (Filipino descent) to serve as Justice of the Minnesota Supreme Court (2026)

=== Federal judges ===
- Michael J. Davis (1972): First African American male appointed as a Judge of the U.S. District Court for the District of Minnesota (1994) and its Chief Judge (2008)
- Leo Brisbois: First Native American male to serve as a U.S. Magistrate judge in Minnesota (2010)
- Tony N. Leung: First Asian American male to become a federal court judge in Minnesota (2011)
- Jeffrey Bryan: First Latino American male federal judge in Minnesota (2023)

=== Attorney General ===
- Keith Ellison (1990): First African American (and first Muslim) to become Attorney General of Minnesota (2018)

=== United States Attorney ===
- B. Todd Jones: First African American male to serve as the United States Attorney for the District of Minnesota (2009)

=== Assistant United States Attorney ===
- Donald M. Lewis: First African American male to serve as an Assistant U.S. Attorney for the District of Minnesota (1982-1988)

=== County Attorney ===
- Ed Rogers: First Native American male elected to serve as a County Attorney in Minnesota (1910)
- John J. Choi (1995): First Korean American male to serve as a County Attorney in Minnesota (2011)

=== Public Defender ===
- Daniel Lew: First Asian American male to serve as a Chief Public Defender in Minnesota (2014)

=== Political Office ===
- Keith Ellison (1990): First African American male (and first Muslim) elected to the U.S. Congress from Minnesota (2006)

=== Bar Association ===
- Jarvis Jones: First African American to serve as the President of the Minnesota State Bar Association (c. 2001)
- Leo Brisbois: First male of American Indian descent to serve as the President of the Minnesota State Bar Association (2009)
- Phil Duran: First openly LGBT male to serve as the President of the Minnesota State Bar Association (2013)

== Firsts in local history ==
- John Francis Wheaton: First African American male to graduate from the University of Minnesota Law School (1897) [Hennepin and Ramsey Counties, Minnesota]
- William R. Morris (c. 1889): First African American male lawyer in Minneapolis, Minnesota [Hennepin County, Minnesota]
- Esteban Rivera: First Latino American male to serve as the President of the Hennepin County Bar Association
- Juan Hoyos: First Latino American male to serve as President of the Ramsey County Bar Association (c. 2009)
- Leonardo Castro: First Hispanic American male to serve as a Chief Judge of the Second Judicial District (2020) [Ramsey County, Minnesota]
- Charles LaDue: First Native American (White Earth Band of Ojibwe) male law graduate from the William Mitchell College of Law (1972) [Saint Paul, Ramsey County, Minnesota]
- Manuel Cervantes: First Latino American male lawyer in Saint Paul, Ramsey County, Minnesota
- Shawn L. Pearson: First African American male judge in the Sixth Judicial District in Duluth, Minnesota (St. Louis County, Minnesota; 2021)

== See also ==
- List of first minority male lawyers and judges in the United States

== Other topics of interest ==
- List of first women lawyers and judges in the United States
- List of first women lawyers and judges in Minnesota
