= Thapa v. St. Cloud Orthopedic Associates =

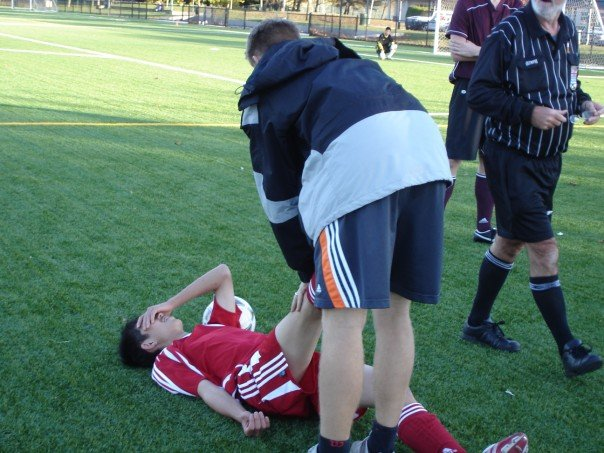
Jyhurt.jpg

Thapa v. St. Cloud Orthopedic Associates is a landmark Minnesota medical malpractice case in which college student Anuj Thapa sued St. Cloud Hospital and associated provider's over negligent post-surgical care. In May 2022, a jury awarded him about $111.25 million, one of the largest malpractice verdicts in Minnesota history.

== Background ==
In January 2017, 19-year-old Anuj Thapa a student from Nepal attending St. Cloud State University was injured playing indoor soccer when he was side-tackled and suffered a severe fracture in his left leg. He was transported to CentraCare’s St. Cloud Hospital by ambulance. Dr. Chad Holien, the on-call orthopedic surgeon from St. Cloud Orthopedic Associates (SCOA), performed surgery that evening, assisted by PA William Paschke.

Despite complaining of intense pain, numbness, burning and poor muscle contraction the next day, Thapa was discharged that night with instructions to call if symptoms worsened. He returned six days later, in excruciating pain, where another physician reopened his leg and discovered acute compartment syndrome a surgical emergency. Surgeons found his leg muscles were “gray” and non-contractile, indicating severe tissue damage.

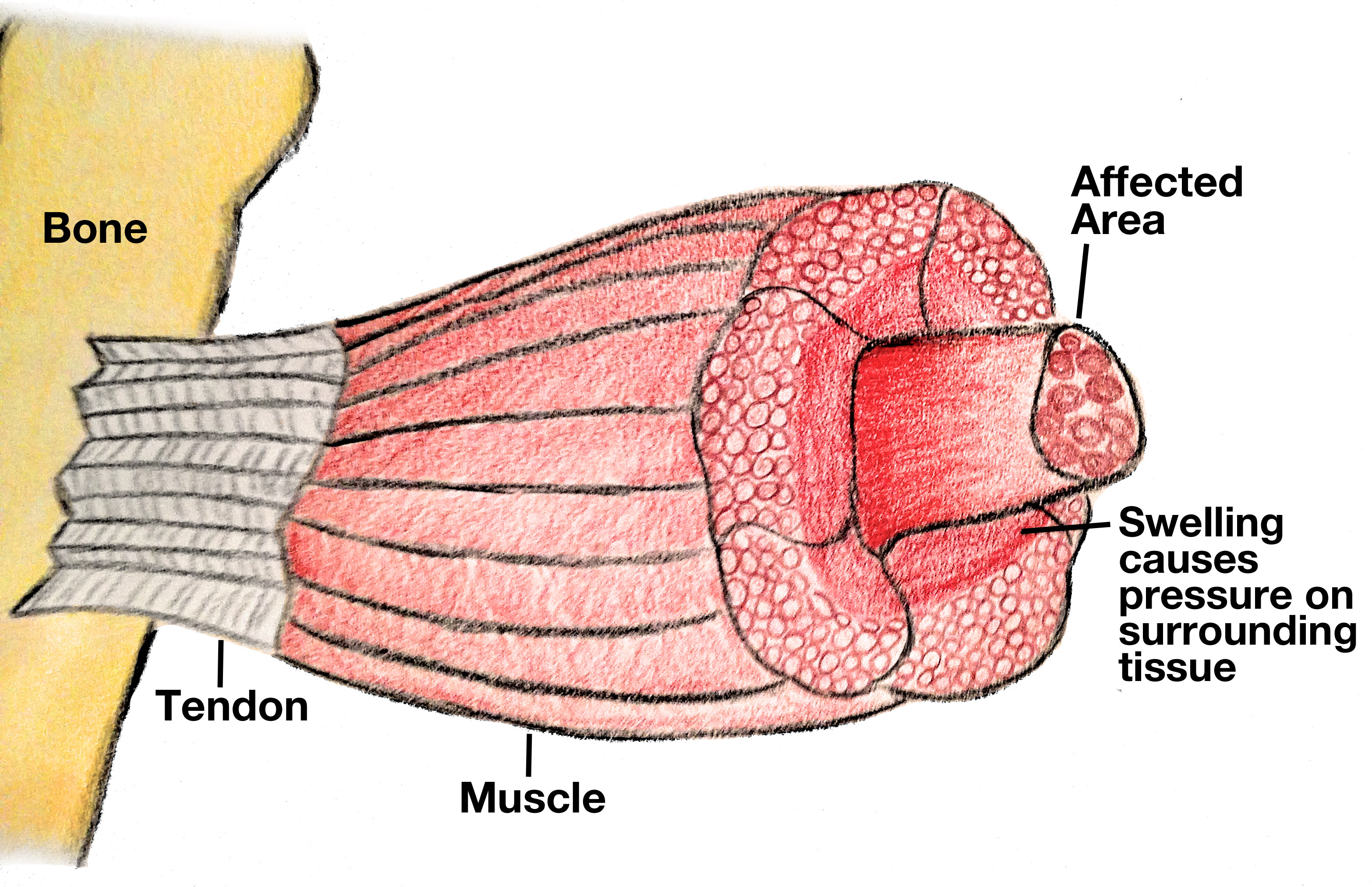
Compartment Syndrome in Muscle (cleaned up) (annotated).jpg

Thapa filed suit in 2019, alleging that SCOA departed from accepted standards of medical care by failing to evaluate his persistent symptoms appropriately and delaying diagnosis of compartment syndrome. He claimed that this negligence caused over 20 additional surgeries, permanent limp, chronic pain, and disability. He may even need hip surgery in the future; his engineering dreams continue but have been forever altered. The defense argued the doctors acted in accord with standard procedures, and that the complications were not their fault.

== Decision ==
=== Jury verdict and award breakdown ===
In May 2022, a federal jury awarded Thapa $111,251,559.22, making it Minnesota’s largest medical malpractice verdict to date. The damages include $100 million for future pain, disability, emotional distress and disfigurement $10 million for past pain and suffering $1+ million for past and future medical expenses No amount was awarded for lost wages or earning capacity.

=== Judicial reduction and settlement ===
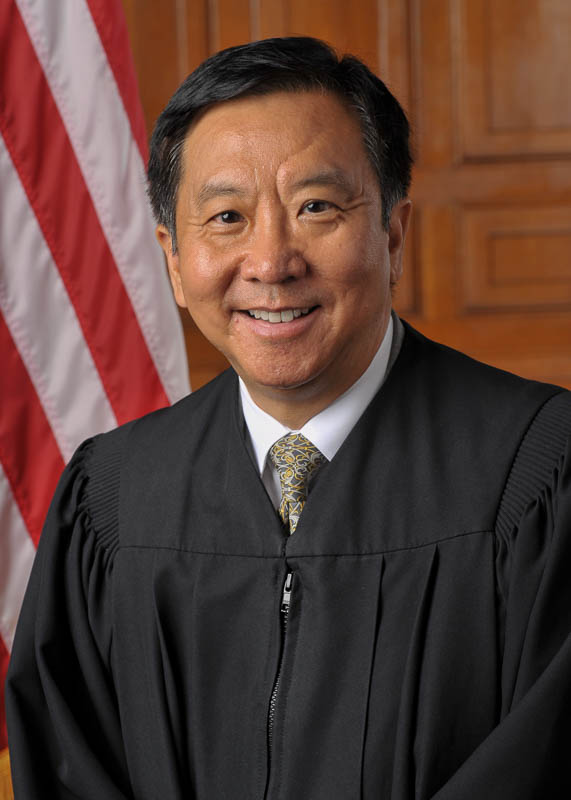
Magistrate Judge Tony N. Leung.jpg

After the verdict, the defense sought a new trial or remittitur, calling the award “shockingly excessive.” In October 2023, U.S. Magistrate Judge Tony Leung ruled that Thapa had to choose between accepting a reduced $10 million award for non-economic damages or retry the damages phase. The judge allowed retention of $1.25 million in economic damages. Thapa’s attorney reportedly said they were still weighing options. Later, in 2024, before a retrial could occur, the parties reached a settlement—though specific financial terms were not publicly disclosed.

== Significance ==
This verdict rattled the medical and legal communities in Minnesota as it shattered previous state malpractice award records, with prior large verdicts capped around $25–35M. It tested the Popovich v. Allina Health doctrine: Minnesota hospitals can be held vicariously liable for independent contractors if they present as the provider and the patient relies on the hospital’s selection of providers. Observers warned medical providers to rethink contracts, insurance, risk policies and emergency protocols in light of possible "shock verdict".

== Aftermath ==
Thapa, now living in Los Angeles due to climate and medical care needs, continues to manage chronic pain and disability from his injuries. His ambition to complete a mechanical engineering degree remains, though challenged by his physical impairment. The case continues to be cited in legal circles as a cautionary example in orthopedic and hospital risk management.
