= Rosalie E. Wahl =

American judge (1924–2013)

Rosalie Wahl

Associate Justice of the Minnesota Supreme Court
- In office 1977–1994
- Appointed by: Rudy Perpich
- Preceded by: Harry H. MacLaughlin
- Succeeded by: Edward C. Stringer

Personal details
- Born: Sara Rosalie Erwin; August 27, 1924 Gordon, Kansas, U.S.
- Died: July 22, 2013 (aged 88) St. Paul, Minnesota, U.S.
- Spouse: Roswell Wahl (m. 1946; div. 1972)
- Education: University of Kansas; William Mitchell College of Law

Sara Rosalie Wahl (née Erwin; August 27, 1924 – July 22, 2013) was an American feminist, lawyer, public defender, clinical law professor, and judge. She was the first woman to serve on the Minnesota Supreme Court, which she did for some seventeen years. Governor Rudy Perpich nominated Wahl to the Minnesota Supreme Court in 1977 and Wahl won the election to the seat in a non-partisan election in 1978, defeating three male candidates. She chaired the state's Gender Bias Taskforce and Racial Bias Taskforce and led the American Bar Association's efforts to establish clinical legal education. She was a champion for the mentally ill and for displaced homemakers. She wrote 549 opinions including for the majority in holding that different penalties for crack and powder cocaine were unconstitutional in State v. Russell (477 N.W.2d 886 [Minn.1993]).

== Early life and education ==
Born in Caney, Kansas, Wahl suffered several traumatic losses early in life. Her mother died when she was three, and her grandmother and Aunt Sara raised her. When she was seven, she opened the railroad crossing gate for their horse-drawn wagon. A late train that had failed to blow its whistle struck and killed her grandfather and younger brother while she watched. A local lawyer required a $100 retainer in order to help them seek restitution, which, as Wahl recounted, "might have well have been a million" during the difficult times of the Depression.

A Quaker since college, Rosalie grew up Methodist. In college, she worked to fight racism through the YWCA and lived in a racially-integrated communal home at the University of Kansas in the 1940s. Having begun as a journalism major, she edited the Daily Kansan. She dropped out and taught in the one-room school in Birch Creek that she herself had attended after her fiancé who had enlisted in the Air Force died in a military training accident in 1943. She returned to school and earned her undergraduate degree in Sociology from the University of Kansas in 1946. She later met, married, and moved to Minnesota with her husband, Roswell Wahl, and lived with friends on forty acres north of Circle Pines at what they hoped would be an intentional community.

== Early career ==
Wahl's foray into political life sought to extend the reach of the county library system, but county board rejected the proposal. After being ushered out of the room and not permitted to observe the board, Wahl decided she was tired of sitting outside of the rooms where men made decisions.

After giving birth to four children, she began attending William Mitchell College of Law (now Mitchell Hamline School of Law) at night and gave birth to her fifth child during her second year. One other woman was in her class and only one woman, the law librarian, served on the faculty.

C. Paul Jones hired Wahl for the newly created public defender's office as an Assistant State Public Defender when she graduated in 1967 and allowed her to work part-time; he was one of the only legal employers to do so, and many of Minnesota's first women lawyers therefore learned from experience of the legal troubles of the poor. (Wahl divorced in 1972.) This work gave her experience defending the indigent but also provided numerous opportunities for appellate oral argument; she argued 109 cases before the Minnesota Supreme Court.

Her experience as a public defender led William Mitchell College of Law to hire her to establish a criminal and civil law clinic in 1973. Law clinics expose students to the practice of law as opposed to the study of legal opinions. Her courses were popular, with students standing in line all night to get one of the sixty places. Many of those students later became active in her campaign.

== Feminist campaign to select a woman to serve on the Minnesota Supreme Court ==
Women rang the doorbells, distributed literature, poured the coffee, served as volunteer office helpers and campaign workers, in essence, did all the chores for state and local politics while the parties chose men to run for office. 1966, Betty Kane had launched a statewide (Democratic Farmer Labor Party) DFL Women's Federation. The DFL Women's Caucus replaced the DFL Women's Federation in 1971 and morphed into the DFL Feminist Caucus in 1973 to fight for feminism within the party—to pressure the party to run more women candidates and to ensure that DFL candidates were pro-choice. A report for the DFL Feminist Caucus captured the sense of the day: women were Present but Powerless.

Although women were gaining entry into law schools and their numbers inched upwards in the 1970a, few served as judges. In 1977, no woman had served on the U.S. Supreme Court, only one woman sat on a federal appellate court, and only five other women served on state supreme courts. The first woman to serve as a Minnesota trial court judge, Susanne C. Sedgwick, a Republican, acquired a seat on the Hennepin County District Court by running against an incumbent in 1970.

Both the Minnesota Women's Political Caucus and Minnesota Women Lawyers set out to identify qualified women. MWL formed a committee and sent a questionnaire to all women lawyers asking if they would be willing to serve on boards or on the bench. Wahl had never argued before a woman judge and did not send her questionnaire back for two years.

In January 1977, Rudy Perpich formally addressed the DFL Feminist Caucus, the first governor to do so. In response to a question, Perpich promised to fill the next vacancy on the Supreme Court with a woman leading to banner newspaper Minneapolis Star headlines the next day saying "Woman in top court promised."

== Selecting Minnesota judges ==
Minnesota's system for selecting judges is non-partisan election. Formally, supreme court justices run for office with no party designation but a designation as incumbent. In practice, sitting justices inform the governor when they are going to step down, and the governor nominates a replacement when the retirement is announced, allowing the nominee to run as an incumbent. If a justice was appointed more than a year before the next election, he or she had to stand in the next one, and then again every six years. As of 1977, only one member of the Minnesota Supreme Court, C. Donald Peterson, had obtained his seat by election rather than appointment. The last incumbent unseated in an election was in 1900. Serious challenges to sitting justices are rare.

== Identifying women candidates ==
Judith L. Oakes chaired Minnesota Women Lawyers' endorsement committee and it winnowed a list of eighteen names to seven (Doris Huspeni, Phyllis Gene Jones, Roberta Levy, Delores Orey, Susanne C. Sedgwick, Esther Tomljanovich, and Rosalie Wahl). Wahl was also on lists that the Minnesota Women's Political Caucus and DFL Feminist Caucus submitted to Governor Rudy Perpich. University of Minnesota law professor Roberta Levy and Hennepin Municipal Judge Diana Murphy were ultimately the other two finalists. (Levy later became the first woman Hennepin County District chief judge while Murphy was the first woman appointed to the federal bench from Minnesota and was later the first woman appointee to the Eighth Circuit of the U.S. Court of Appeals the least gender diverse of all the circuit courts).

== Appointment to the Minnesota Supreme Court ==
When President Carter nominated Senator Walter Mondale's former law partner and associate justice of the Minnesota Supreme Court, Harry MacLaughlin, to the federal bench, Minneapolis Star reporter Gwenyth Jones wrote a front-page column reminding the governor and all readers of his promise. Rather than name his appointee as the news of MacLaughlin's elevation broke Governor Perpich instead, announced only that he would appoint a woman.

Perpich knew that the first woman appointed would have many challengers who wanted a seat on the Supreme Court. If she were defeated, he would then have squandered the power to shape the bench. Another unpredictable populist governor, Jerry Brown of California, had appointed a woman, Rose Bird, as the first woman and the first chief justice of the California Supreme Court in February 1977. Bird just barely held her seat in 1978 but subsequently lost a retention election in a hard-fought campaign. Carol Connolly promised the governor that she would manage Wahl’s campaign. If Wahl lost, future governors might conclude it was too risky to appoint a woman.

The decision to appoint a woman and the choice of Wahl stirred more intense emotions than any other government appointment in Minnesota history." On Friday, June 3rd 1977, at a gathering of nearly 4,500 women meeting in St. Cloud Minnesota to hammer out a platform and choose delegates to the upcoming White House Conference on Women in Houston, conference chair Minnesota Secretary of State Joan Growe announced that Governor Rudy Perpich would appoint Rosalie Wahl to the state supreme court—the first woman and its 72nd justice. The crowd erupted as Wahl came to the microphone. Wahl promised to remember all the women who came before her who knew disappointment, scorn, and exclusion.

Wahl spoke of being a mother of four starting law school, inspired to write this poem:

Foot in nest

Wing in sky

Bound by each

Hover I

"Now," she said, "I know it is not necessary to hover. Now I know it is possible to soar." As Judge Harriet Lansing recalls, "Rosalie's carefully chosen words left so indelible an impression that they were published in their entirety in the next morning's Minneapolis Star." A reception in St. Paul on June 9 to celebrate the appointment, party activist Koryne Horbal clasped Wahl's hand and tearfully said, "Thank you for being ready."

== The Campaign ==
For the first time in two decades, a seated Supreme Court Justice had a serious opponent, or rather in Wahl’s case, three, meaning she would face a primary. Ramsey County District Court Judge Jerome J. Plunkett, Rochester District Court Judge Daniel Foley, and former Attorney General Robert W. Mattson filed. Her opponents criticized her lack of judicial experience. Wahl won the primary, receiving 231,000 votes to the next highest vote getter Mattson’s 130,000, but Mattson adopted Plunkett’s criticisms in the general election. If all those who voted for Plunkett and Foley voted for Mattson, Wahl would lose.

Mattson ran a series of negative ads giving reasons to vote against Wahl. He claimed she had a poor win/loss record before the Supreme Court. (Wahl's appellate practice argued the cases of the indigent already convicted but appealing.) Another ad, patterned after the campaign against Rose Bird in California, charged that “Ms. [sic] Wahl lets rapists loose.” (She was the sole dissenter in State v. Willis, (269 N.W.2d [Minn. 1978]) a case of a rapist who had held his victim at knifepoint. Wahl had dissented because a trial court had suppressed evidence and the police had unlawfully searched the defendant’s house.) Another ad charged she let drug dealers loose.

Rosalie Wahl was the highest vote getter on the ballot in November 1978, holding on to her seat. She became the tenth woman serving on a state supreme court in 1977.

Four important factors helped ensure Wahl’s electoral success. First, her colleagues supported her, unlike Chief Justice Rose Bird. Chief Justice Sandy Keith who joined the court later wrote of her ability to get along with others. Justice Sheran observed: "Life taught Wahl to take a punch, and that ability helped her be productive in situations where a less resilient and tolerant person would have fled in frustration. She appeared to be as comfortable with senior partners in the Manhattan boardroom at Sullivan & Cromwell as she was in southeastern Minnesota with a group of farm women. Her grace in working with those who did not necessarily share her ideals is one of her strongest qualities, and it allowed her to accomplish projects in the face of repeated setbacks."

Judge Peterson, who also faced a challenge, joined forces with Wahl and they campaigned together, allowing them to draw on an existing fund called the Lawyers Committee to Retain Incumbent Justices, already in place from past elections. That fund gave them $10,000 as a base for the joint campaign and a chair already in place.

Second, Wahl actively campaigned and enjoyed widespread support. Wahl recounted, "women were very crucial in this campaign because the women in the state knew that if I couldn’t be elected, no governor would appoint a woman, because it would be just throwing an appointment away." Historian Mary Pruitt described the Wahl campaign as “the single moment everyone [in a very fractious feminist movement] worked together.”. The Citizens Committee to Retain Rosalie Wahl raised about $29,000 and pulled in allies from the Minnesota Women’s Political Caucus and Minnesota Women lawyers who were nonpartisan.

Wahl assembled a coalition of William Mitchell College of Law alumni, faculty, and students, as well as elites and grassroots organizers for social change, from feminists, to public interest lawyers, to Quakers, to the League of Women Voters. She also proved to be an effective campaigner. Mattson’s dishonesty in the debate before the Ramsey County Bar Association, his efforts to smear Wahl's son in the press, and negative campaign further aroused Wahl’s fighting spirit. While serving as a justice on the Supreme Court, Wahl traversed the state, speaking to bar associations, women’s groups, and other community organizations, such as churches and hospitals.

The third factor was the quality of the candidate. Wahl was an experienced advocate—not from working for a prestigious law firm, but from defending the indigent as a public defender. As a clinical law professor, Wahl not only supervised students but she had substantial experience arguing criminal law cases before the Supreme Court—unlike Mattson. She had the support of both political parties. The Minnesota State Bar Association took its traditional plebiscite on judicial candidates and Wahl got 2,547 votes to 779 for Robert Mattson Sr., the other top vote getter of the primary.

Fourth, Mattson’s negative campaign backfired. The Minnesota State Bar Association, worried about the issue of judicial independence and uneasy about judicial elections, came to Wahl’s defense. Chief Justice Sheran talked to friends at the Bar Association and they wrote a letter to the paper denouncing Mattson’s ads The Minneapolis Tribune editorialized against “Mattson’s Injudicious Campaign” on October 22, saying his distortion of Wahl’s office rendered him unfit for office. Wahl said she was lucky to face Mattson, “because a lot of lawyers did not think really highly of him.”

Hundreds of women wrote to Wahl about what her appointment meant to them. As Kenney writes, "Like blasting Sally Ride into space, Wahl's appointment symbolized that women's political exclusion had dramatically ended; that women were smart and capable of assuming leadership positions, and that the feminist movement and arrived and had clout."

== Impact on the law ==
Republican Governor Al Quie appointed a second woman, Mary Jeanne Coyne to the Supreme Court in 1982. Wahl recounts that prior to that, she had not realized how isolated she felt. Wahl retained her seat easily without challenge in 1984. Perpich went on to appoint more women than had been appointed by all of the previous governors of Minnesota combined. He was the first governor to select a woman, Marlene Johnson, as his running mate for lieutenant governor. Most of the women on Perpich’s first short list ultimately served on the state or federal bench, if not the Minnesota Supreme Court.

Until Wahl retired in 1994, the Minnesota Supreme Court was the first state in history to have a majority (4 of 7) women justices. Research on the effects of increasing numbers of women on the Minnesota Supreme Court showed little effect in voter participation in judicial races, an increased willingness on the part of lawyers to appeal women’s rights cases (which peaked at three justices), and some reports of an altered courtroom atmosphere. Kathleen Blatz, a Republican, became the first woman chief justice in 1998, holding that office until 2006.

Wahl had an enormous impact on the law, women’s equality, the legal system, and legal education. She wrote 549 opinions over seventeen years. She looked at the judicial system from the bottom up, championing the underdog, the marginalized, or the outcast, such as criminal defendants. She believed that Minnesota’s constitution held the government to a higher standard of rationality than the federal constitution did the national government and argued for a more expansive interpretation of individual rights than under the U.S. Constitution. She wrote for the majority in holding that different penalties for crack and powder cocaine were unconstitutional in State v. Russell (477 N.W.2d 886 [Minn.1993]). Her opinions on race and sex discrimination were especially important. She had what her former clerk, Jane Larson, called “her longest running struggle with other members of the supreme court” over how to interpret statutes allowing for the availability of permanent rather than rehabilitative maintenance for long-term homemaker spouses. Wahl would often say that she thought men had trouble understanding the experience of a midlife woman whose husband is divorcing her.

Her compassion for parents who might cross the line in seeking to “de-program” an adult child who has become part of a religious cult, or for parents seeking custody after divorce, or for those who hope to regain custody after a termination shines through her opinions. As Court of Appeals Judge Harriet Lansing wrote about the way Justice Wahl applied the reasonable man standard: "Rosalie’s opinions, in both her use of language and her analyses, often demonstrate a wider definition of reason that does not artificially omit or ostracize the effect of human emotions on perception and thought. She brings in the emotions to better focus the picture and, when relevant, incorporates them into the decision."

Larson described Wahl’s commitment to the common person and writing accessible opinions. "In one case probably little remembered on the statewide scene, Huver v. Opatz, the issue was whether one rural township or another was to be held responsible for maintaining the roadside beside a particular stretch of county line road. Justice Wahl drafted her opinions with her clerks by her side, and when we came to the section of the opinion in which the road is to be described, Justice Wahl refused to borrow the description from any of the briefs. 'Look in the trial court records for any photographs, any physical detail,' she told me. “The people who live in those townships know this road like the back of their hand. And this opinion will mean a tax increase for one group of citizens or the other. The court’s opinion must communicate to them that we, too see this road as a real place, connecting real lives, like no other in the state. It is not just some convenient geographical hook on which to hang an abstract legal principle.'

Judge Harriet Lansing commented further on the poetry of Wahl’s opinions. "Rosalie’s inclusivity of landscape is one of the enduring delights of her opinions. Her descriptions and metaphors of the heartland are great sources of strength. Whether it is layering sod along a culvert in Kliniski v. Southdale Manor Inc., or observing a dew-laden bulldozer in Anderson v. American Casualty Col. Or listening to the rattle of old rain gutters beside a chicken coop in State v. Anderson you can see the meadow stretching beyond. But my personal favorite is her evocation in In re Wang of a substantial evidence standards as “evidence with heft.” I can see the threshers in the field and taste the lemon meringue pie for lunch."

Wahl mentored women clerks. One of her former clerks, Amy Adams, wrote, "I have never met anyone as fiercely committed to the preservation of individual dignity as Justice Wahl. In every decision, every hearing, every encounter, she remained committed to the ideal that each person is entitled to decency and respect, and she granted that respect to everyone; justices, trial court judges, litigants, and attorneys. I never saw Justice Wahl listen to an oral argument while sitting back in her chair. She always leaned forward, giving each oralist her full attention, assuring each party that he or she was receiving a full and fair hearing of his or her argument."

It was said that "She spearheaded and chaired the state taskforce on gender fairness and the courts; Minnesota was the sixth state to conduct such a study. She then went on to chair the state's racial bias taskforce. She was a longtime champion of the rights of the mentally ill. “What is not so well known in the state where she lives is that Wahl’s contributions to legal education may have more national impact than her work as a state supreme court justice.” Wahl was the first woman to chair the American Bar Association’s Accreditation Committee as well as the Section of Legal Education and Admissions to the Bar where she shrewdly and skillfully put together the strategy for expanding clinical legal education. She was a pivotal member of the National Association of Women Judges which awarded her the Joan Demsey Klein award honoree of the year award in 2004. The Minnesota State Bar Association named an annual award in her honor. Minnesota Women Lawyers named its annual lecture in her honor".

Wahl recalls the exhilarating sense of making history and that women have learned the hard way that those holding power never share it until it becomes politically necessary to do so. She chuckled over the local comic strip, Sally Forth, which shows the girl, Hilary, at Halloween admiring her costume of a black robe in the mirror. She says to her mother, who holds the witch’s hat in her lap, “Oh put away the hat, I'll just go as a Supreme Court Justice.” She concludes, "Such evidence of increased participation is sweet, even though what I and others have experienced as dramatic leaps ahead are, in a larger perspective, only the slow erosion of individual and institutional sexism. . . . Women with access to power and status must not allow this to separate them from their knowledge of what it means to be female in this society. Certainly every woman of accomplishment owes it to another woman to reach out and assist her growth and aspiration. We are responsible, socially and individually, for helping other women achieve their desired goals. Thus, in our own sphere, we work for the election or appointment of women judges to the bench."

Wahl served on the court until her retirement in 1994. She remained active in the community, regularly attending meetings from the Minnesota Women’s Consortium to Minnesota Women Lawyers, raising money for groups such as Leaders of Today and Tomorrow that encourages college-aged women to aspire to political leadership positions, and actively protesting the war in Iraq.

She died on July 22, 2013, at the age of 88.

Supreme Court Chief Justice Lorie Gildea issued a statement on the death of former justice Wahl:

"Rosalie Wahl was a trailblazer for our state, both as a lawyer and as the first woman to serve on the Minnesota Supreme Court. While on the court she led efforts to address both gender fairness and racial bias in our state's justice system. She will be remembered with fondness and respect for her unwavering commitment to the principle of equal justice for all." In an interview with Peter Shea done in 2003 she talks about her post-retirement role as a "public citizen," including her work as a peace activist.

The Minnesota Historical Society published Minneapolis Star Tribune columnist Lori Sturdevant's book, Her Honor: Rosalie Wahl and the Minnesota Women's Movement, in 2014.

Nina Tottenburg narrates Emily Hoddad's documentary film about Wahl entitled, "The Girl from Birch Creek."

Stanford University Law Library's ABA Trailblazers project holds an interview of Wahl by Cara Lee Neville.

== See also ==
- List of female state supreme court justices
- List of first women lawyers and judges in Minnesota

== License note ==
This article incorporates text from a free content work. Licensed under CC BY-SA 3.0 unported (license statement/permission). Text taken from Thank you for Being Ready: Rosalie Wahl holds her place on the Minnesota Supreme Court, Sally J. Kenney, Center on Women and Public Policy Case Study Program, Humphrey Institute of Public Affairs, University of Minnesota.
