= Tony Leung =

Tony Leung may refer to:

- Tony Leung Chiu-wai (born 1962), Hong Kong actor known as "Little Tony"
- Tony Leung Ka-fai (born 1958), Hong Kong actor known as "Big Tony"
- Tony N. Leung (born 1959), United States magistrate judge

== See also ==
- Antony Leung (born 1952), Hong Kong businessman
