= Martha Angle Dorsett =

American lawyer (1851–1918)

Martha Angle Dorsett (2 April 1851 – 8 March 1918) was the first woman admitted to the bar in the state of Minnesota.

== Early life and education ==
Martha A. Angle was born 2 April 1851 in Randolph, Cattaraugus County, New York, the daughter of Nicholas Angle and Mary Ewing. She attended local schools and graduated from the University of Michigan in 1877. She attended and graduated from the Iowa College of Law, now Drake University Law School, in 1876.

== Marriage and family ==
She married Charles William Dorsett (28 September 1850 – 1936) on 29 June 1876. They had met at the Iowa College of Law, where both graduated. She and her husband later were parents to at least 6 children, some of whom they adopted.

The Dorsetts moved west to Minnesota, where she became the first woman to be admitted to the bar, after passing the bar with high grades and challenging the state's statute limiting the profession to men. They were part of the continuing migration of the 19th century. Later Charles Dorsett ran twice for Governor of Minnesota on the ticket of the Prohibition Party, but was unsuccessful. Martha Dorsett died 8 March 1918 at Minneapolis, Minnesota and is buried at Lakewood Cemetery.

== Professional ==
After their marriage in June 1876, she and her husband moved to Minnesota. She had taken his name and applied as Martha Dorsett for admission to the State Bar of Minnesota in 1876, the first woman ever to do so, after passing the exam with high scores. Her application was denied on the grounds that state law only permitted males to practice law. In the words of Judge Young, the one who denied her application, "The lady passed the best examination of any applicant for admission that has been presented for a long time."

She and her husband Charles William Dorsett campaigned in the State legislature to have the statute amended. On 27 February 1877, by a vote of 63 to 30, the House approved. Martha Dorsett was admitted to the bar in 1878.

She later served as Treasurer and member of the Board of Directors of Maternity Hospital, located at 2529 4th Avenue South, Minneapolis, which opened on 30 November 1886.

== See also ==
- List of first women lawyers and judges in Minnesota
