= Arthur and Edith Lee House =

Historic house in Minnesota, United States

- U.S. National Register of Historic Places
- Minneapolis Landmark
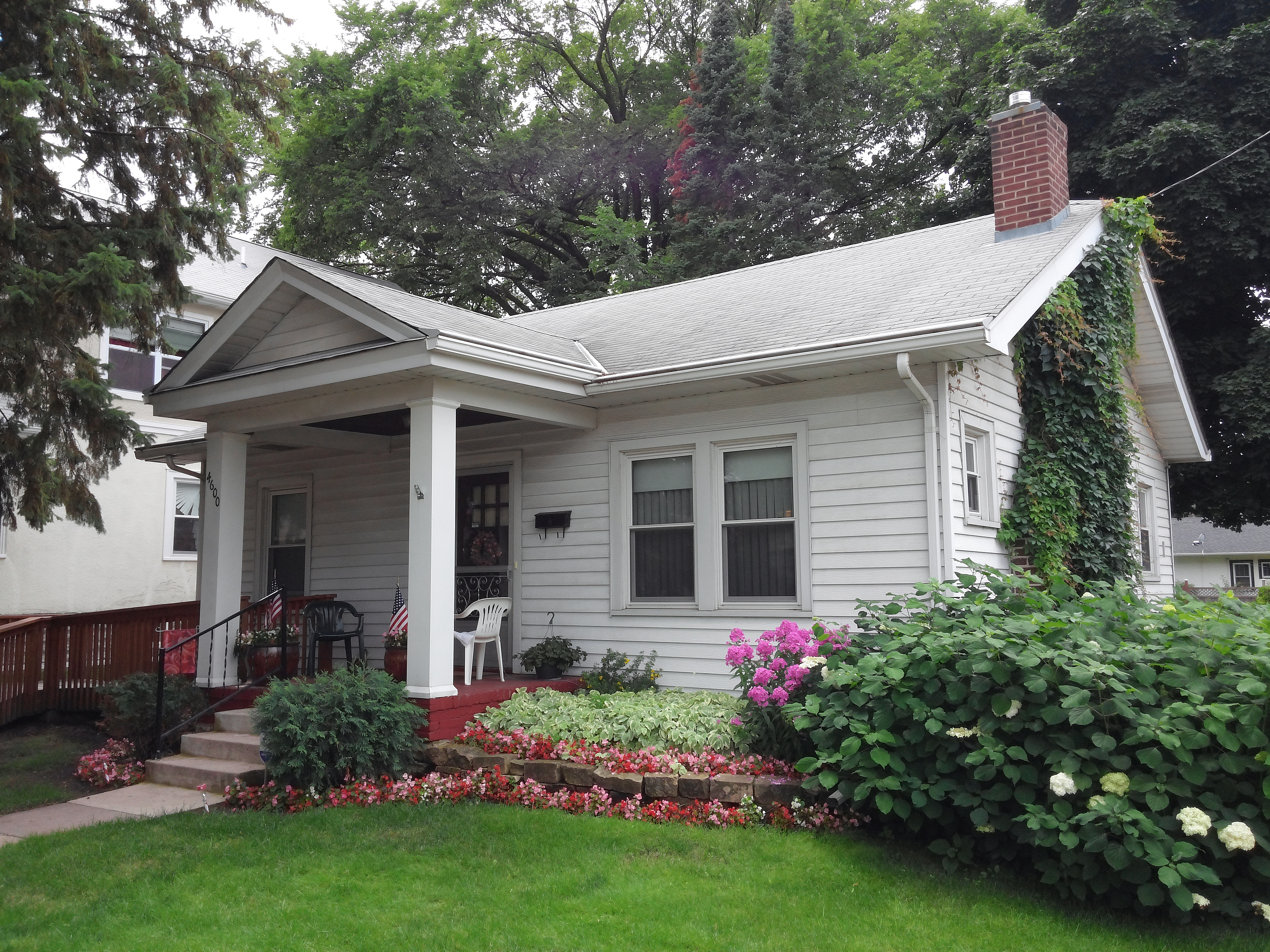
- Arthur and Edith Lee House, 2014

- Location within Minnesota Location within the United States
- Location: 4600 Columbus Avenue South, Minneapolis, Minnesota
- Coordinates: 44°55′11″N 93°15′50″W
- Area: less than one acre
- Built: 1923
- NRHP reference No.: 14000391

Significant dates
- Added to NRHP: July 11, 2014
- Designated MPLSL: 2016

The Arthur and Edith Lee House is a historic place located in the Field neighborhood of Minneapolis, Minnesota, United States. It was originally constructed in 1923. In the early 1930s, Arthur Lee and Edith Lee, an African-American couple, acquired ownership of the home, which came during a period of racial discrimination in housing deeds, and the house was located in a predominately White neighborhood. The Lee family endured violent threats from White neighbors and eventually moved out of the house in 1934 after several years of unrest. The home had renewed interest in the 2000s from scholars of racial discrimination in housing and it was added to the U.S. National Register of Historic Places in 2014.

== History ==
The home was built in 1923 and has similarities to kit houses common to the era.

In 1927 hundreds of property owners in the area had created the Eugene Field Neighborhood Association and signed a "gentleman's agreement" with the neighborhood association pledging to not sell or rent their property to non-Whites. This group had success purging much of the blocks around 46th and Columbus of non-whites. It was only by one neighbor with an unsettled grudge that the Lees were allowed any chance to buy into the neighborhood.

In June 1931 Arthur and Edith Lee, an African-American couple, purchased the home with a down payment and a mortgage. The Lees moved in July and shortly the neighborhood association formed a committee to offer them $5000 for the house they had just paid $4700 for. Lee asked for $7500 and negotiations ended.

Around July 8 neighbors began to harass them with shouted insults and violent threats. By Saturday July 11 the crowd numbered about 150. The Lees kept their house darkened, stones pelted the siding as the porch and garage were splashed with a black paint or similar substance.

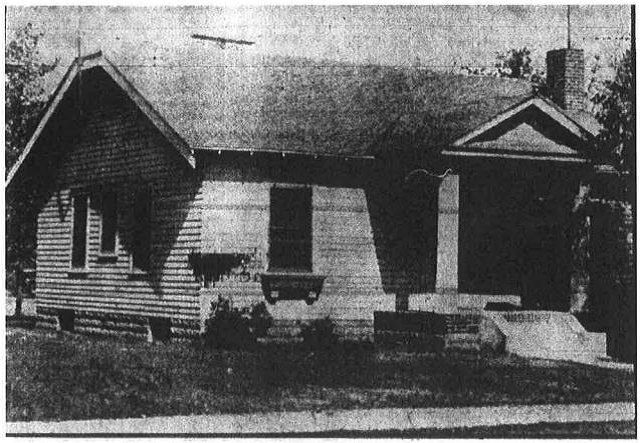
Arthur and Edith Lee home splattered in black paint, July 1931

The unrest escalated over the next several days as crowds growing into the hundreds and later thousands continued their campaign of harassment. The yard was littered with signs bearing racial slurs as garbage and excrement joined the hurled objects. At its peak refreshment wagons flocked nearby streets doing bustling business into the early morning.

Local police, including captain A. C. Jensen were sent to maintain the peace but offered little additional support to the Lees. It was only on Sunday the 12th that arrests were even threatened, citing this to be an unlawful gathering. This night was only quelled by the captain suggesting the neighborhood association meet with the mayor and a committee of colored leaders to seek a solution.

Mayor Anderson claimed he could not interfere and implied the situation did not beg his responsibility to uphold law and order.

On July 15 the Minneapolis Tribune broke a media blackout on the situation with a front-page story entitled "Home Stoned in Race Row." Arthur Lee, a World War I veteran, was quoted in the article as saying "Nobody asked me to move out when I was in France fighting in mud and water for this country. I came out here to make this house my home. I have a right to establish a home." The publicity from the article generated even larger crowds as well as onlookers. All available police in the city were called to form a cordon around the house and ensure nearby streets were not blocked by the mob.

Discussions with the neighborhood and community leaders during this unrest had been unproductive with the Lees' attorney advising them to say they were planning to leave to quell the unrest. The Lees were members of the local NAACP chapter and reached out to them for assistance. Lena O. Smith, the chapter's president, offered legal assistance and argued the Lees should remain as a statement that they would not be intimidated. The Lees accepted Smith's counsel and she drafted a statement published in all of the local newspapers noting that "[Mr. Lee] has no intention of moving now or later, even after we are assured the feeling in the district has subsided."

The police presence remained at the Lees' house for more than a year thereafter; the Lees' daughter was escorted to and from school by police. In 1934 the Lee family moved from the home to the historically black Central neighborhood in Minneapolis.

== Legacy ==
Interest in the home's history was renewed in 2001 when a law professor published an article on the Lees' second attorney, Lena O. Smith, including her role in the event. The house was added to the National Register of Historic Places in 2014 on the basis of its significance to the social history of African Americans and housing discrimination in Minneapolis. There is now a plaque and effigy prominently displayed on the corner of the lot.

== See also ==
- History of Minneapolis
- Housing discrimination in the United States
- List of incidents of civil unrest in Minneapolis–Saint Paul
- Redlining
