= Chicago Commission on Race Relations =

Commission set up after the Chicago riot of 1919

The Chicago Commission on Race Relations was a non-partisan, interracial investigative committee, appointed by Illinois governor Frank Lowden. The commission was set up after the Chicago riots of July and August 1919 in "which thirty-eight lives were lost, twenty-three Negros and fifteen whites, and 537 persons were injured".The purpose of the commission was to investigate the causes of the Riot and make recommendations to prevent a tragedy like this from reoccurring. The research was the first extensive research on interracial Black-white relations conducted in Chicago funded by a government agency.

The sociological study was published in 1922 by the University of Chicago Press as The Negro in Chicago – A Study of Race Relations and a Race Riot. The study included a substantial review of the background of the riots, the riots themselves, and their aftermath, together with original work and investigation into the relations between and perceptions of the black and white communities in Chicago. The Negro in Chicago ran to 672 pages with a number of plates, plans and other additional matter.

== The Commission ==
The Chicago Commission on Race Relations was established at a meeting of eighty-one citizens, representing forty-eight social, civic, commercial, and professional organizations of Chicago. They set up a commission composed entirely of men six African-Americans and six European-Americans:

European Americans

- Edgar Bancroft
- William Scott Bond
- Edward Osgood Brown
- Harry Eugene Kelly
- Victor Lawson
- Julius Rosenwald

African Americans

- Robert Sengstacke Abbott
- George Cleveland Hall
- George H. Jackson
- Edward H. Morris
- Adelbert H. Roberts
- Lacey Kirk Williams

Before conducting the research, the commission felt that a strong emphasis should be placed on understanding the life of the Negro in Chicago, in particular the relations between the two races. The following six subcommittees were created:

- Committee on Racial Clashes
- Committee on Housing, Committee on Industry
- Committee on Industry,
- Committee on Crime
- Committee on Racial Contracts
- Committee on Public Opinion

Chicago at this time experienced a substantial increase of Black migration from the South. World War I had brought industrial jobs to cities in the North but many of these jobs were subject to a color bar and only available to whites. The arrival of black people in northern cities led to an increase in rent in underdeveloped neighborhoods and white flight. Expansion of the ghetto caused friction among white residents such that "bombs were thrown at black owned homes".

The research was conducted by a series of "conferences or informal hearings, and through research and fieldwork carried on by staff or trained investigator". Chicago's neighborhoods were classified into four groups: (1) mixed, unadjusted neighborhoods; (2) mixed, adjusted neighborhoods; (3) contested areas; and (4) neighborhoods that are entirely white or negro.

The study concluded that there were no immediate solutions to remedy the tensions between the racial groups and suggested that "through mutual understanding and sympathy between the races will be followed by harmony and co-operation".

== Records ==
The records of the commission are stored in the Illinois State Archives.
