= Lena O. Smith =

20th century Minneapolis civil rights advocate

Lena Olive Smith (August 13, 1885 − Nov. 6, 1966) was a lawyer and civil rights advocate in Minneapolis during the early to mid-20th century. She was the first female African American lawyer in Minnesota, helped establish a local chapter of the National Urban League in Minneapolis, and was an active member and the first female president of the National Association for the Advancement of Colored People's Minneapolis chapter.

== Early life ==
Smith was born on August 13, 1885, in Lawrence, Kansas, to John H. and Geneva D. Smith. In 1905 Smith moved with her father to Buxton, Iowa, and worked at the company store of the coal mine located there. In 1906 her father died of heart failure. Smith reunited with her mother and four younger siblings and moved to Minneapolis.

Smith worked a variety of jobs to help support her family including as a hairdresser and real estate agent. As a real estate agent she was exposed to housing discrimination against African Americans and the use of restrictive housing covenants. In 1916 she enrolled in the Northwestern College of Law (one of the forerunners of the William Mitchell College of Law). While taking classes she became active with the local chapter of the NAACP and filed suits against discriminatory businesses, helped investigate a lynching incident in Duluth, Minnesota, and ensured adequate legal representation for African Americans standing trial. She graduated from law school in 1921 and was admitted to the bar in June of that year. Smith was the first female African American lawyer in Minnesota and likely one of only several in the entire country.

== Professional career ==
Smith immediately began filing suits fighting instances of housing and employment discrimination against African Americans. In response to a survey showing many local businesses had no African American employees and would not hire any, she worked to establish a local branch of the National Urban League to help expand employment and housing opportunities for African Americans.

Smith later continued her work as the head of the Minneapolis NAACP's Legal Redress Committee from 1926 to 1930. She earned a reputation as an aggressive negotiator who also cultivated respect and confidently handled proceedings with the public, the press and in the courtroom. Her professionalism and reputation led to her election as the chapter's president from 1930 to 1939; she was the first woman to hold the position. Asked by a graduate student what traits helped land her this prestigious role, Smith responded that while some people took a less confrontational stance on segregation and racial equality "I’m from the West and fearless. I’m used to doing the right thing without regard for myself. Of course battles leave their scars but I’m willing to make the sacrifice. I think it is my duty."

In 1931 she became involved in the case of Arthur and Edith Lee, an African American couple who purchased a home in a predominantly white neighborhood in South Minneapolis. After enduring threats from the neighborhood and rebuffing an offer to sell their home back to several neighbors, tensions exploded into rioting. Crowds of thousands gathered to throw stones and taunt the Lees while their friends surrounded the home in solidarity and police attempted to keep the peace. Lee's original legal counsel advised them to take a vacation to let the outrage die down and consider selling the home back to the neighborhood for the right offer. Lee later turned to Smith for advice; she advised them to hold strong and make a stand. The Lees made Smith their official legal representation and held strong until the outrage subsided.

Smith continued to practice law into the 1950s and 1960s and remained active with the NAACP and other professional organizations. In 1965 Smith was honored as an invited guest of Lyndon Johnson's inauguration in Washington, D. C. She died on November 6, 1966, at the age of 81.

On the basis of her contributions to Minneapolis history, Smith's longtime house in South Minneapolis was added to the National Register of Historic Places in 1991 as the Lena O. Smith House. The Minnesota Black Women's Lawyer Network also holds an annual luncheon named in her honor.

== See also ==
- List of first women lawyers and judges in Minnesota
