= Edward H. Morris =

American politician

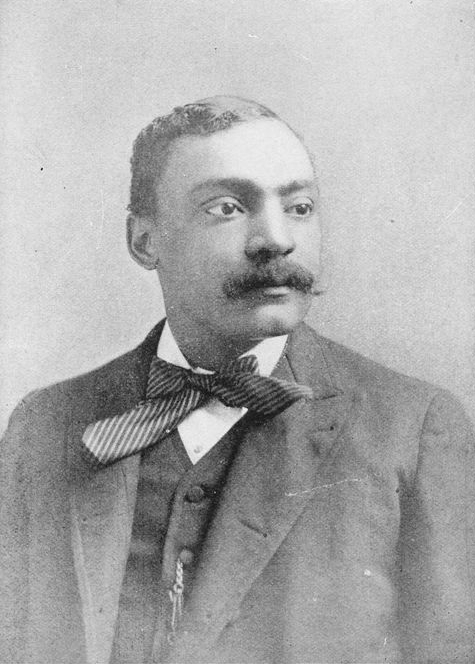
- Morris c. 1913

Member of the Illinois House of Representatives
- Constituency: Cook County
- In office 1890–1892
- In office 1902–1904

Personal details
- Born: May 30, 1858 Flemingsburg, Kentucky
- Died: February 3, 1943 (aged 84) Washington, D.C.
- Party: Republican
- Occupation: Lawyer, politician

Edward H. Morris (May 30, 1858 – February 3, 1943) was an African-American lawyer and state legislator in Illinois.

== Early life ==
Morris was born in Flemingsburg, Kentucky, on May 30, 1858. He was the son of a slave. He graduated from St. Patrick's High School, Chicago.

== Law career ==
Morris was admitted to the Chicago Bar in 1879 and became the fifth African American lawyer admitted to the Illinois Bar. He became one of Chicago's most successful black lawyers, and by the mid-1880s had become considered the unofficial "dean of colored lawyers" in Chicago.

Morris served as a mentor to many Black attorneys, including Frederick McGhee, who in 1885 joined Morris in practice.

== State and local office ==
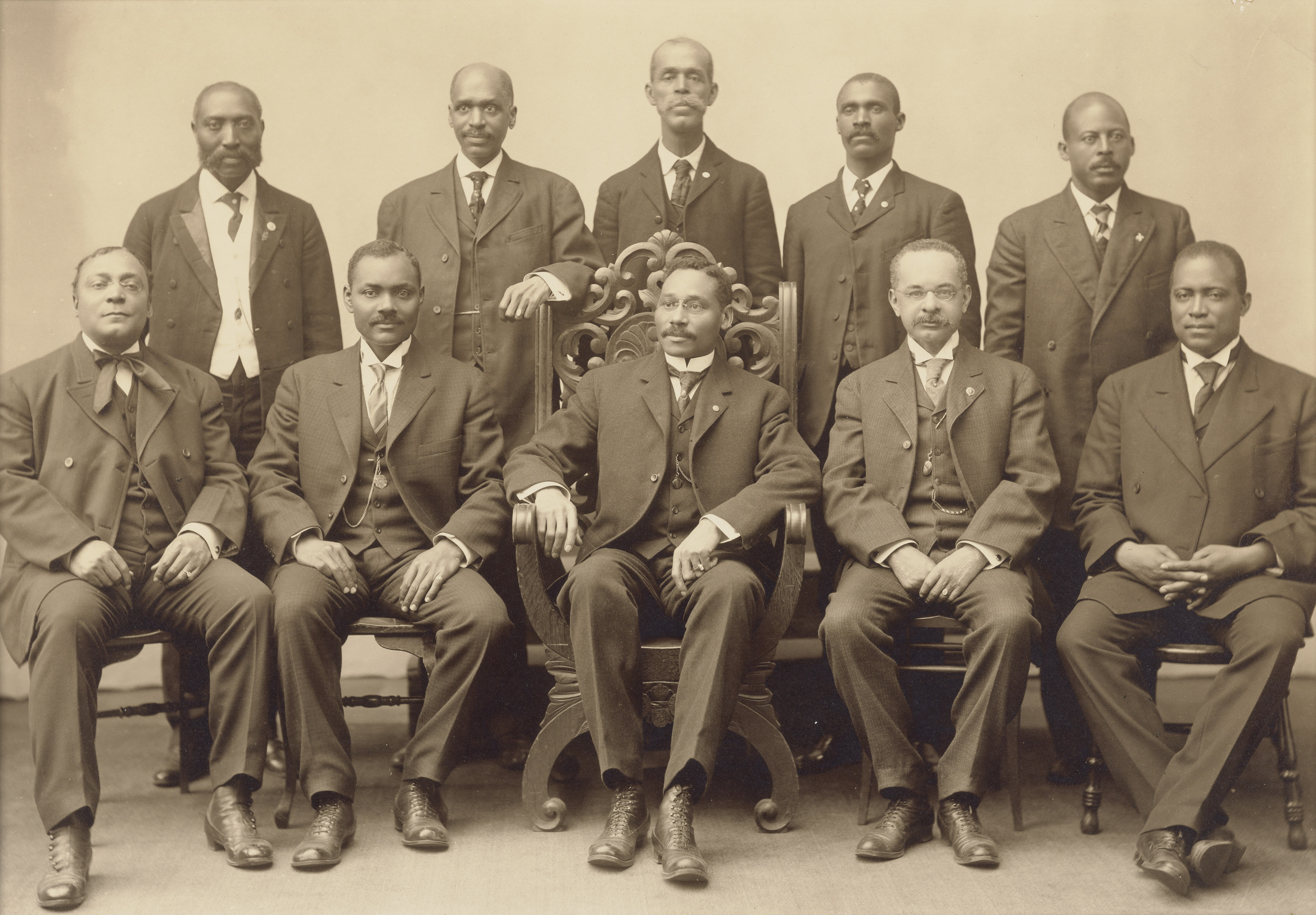
Morris (seated, far left) on the Sub-Committee of Management and Counsel of the Grand United Order of Odd Fellows, 1908

In 1891, Morris was elected to the Illinois House of Representatives as a Republican, and represented Cook County in the chamber from 1890 to 1892 and again from 1902 to 1904. He served as a town attorney of South Chicago, Illinois in 1892 and again in 1896. In 1895, he served as an Assistant Sate's Attorney in Cook County, Illinois. In 1919 he was appointed to the Chicago Commission on Race Relations.

== Death ==
Edward H. Morris died in Washington, D.C., on February 3, 1943.
