= Fredrick McGhee =

American lawyer (1861–1912)

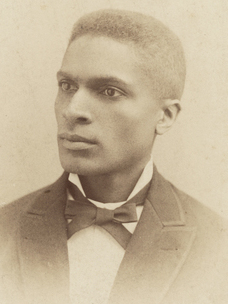
- McGhee, c. 1890s
- Born: Fredrick Lamar McGhee; October 28, 1861; C. Aberdeen, Mississippi
- Died: September 9, 1912 (aged 50); Saint Paul, Minnesota
- Resting place: Calvary Cemetery, Saint Paul
- Education: Knoxville College
- Occupations: Attorney; African American civil rights leader
- Political party: Democratic Party (after 1893) Republican (until 1893)

Fredrick Lamar McGhee (October 28, 1861 – September 9, 1912) was an African-American criminal defense lawyer and civil rights activist. Born a slave in Mississippi, McGhee would become the first black attorney in Minnesota. Alongside close friend and collaborator of W. E. B. Du Bois, McGhee would leave the National Afro-American Council to help co-found the Niagara Movement.

McGhee has been noted as one of the first prominent Black supporters of the Democratic Party at a time when Black voters overwhelmingly supported the Republican Party. McGhee was a vocal supporter of William Jennings Bryan in the 1900 presidential election, and spoke out against Republican William McKinley's support for imperialism. McGhee is also noted for being a convert to Catholicism in a time when African Americans were overwhelmingly Protestant.

== Early life and education ==
McGhee was born near Aberdeen, Mississippi, to Abraham McGhee and Sarah Walker, who were enslaved. His father, from Blount County, Tennessee, was literate, rare for an enslaved person in those times, and later became a lay Baptist preacher. The McGhees escaped slavery from the John A. Walker farmer near Aberdeen with Union troops in 1864, and made their way to Knoxville, Tennessee, where Abraham McGhee had been enslaved as a younger man.

Abraham McGhee died in 1873 and Sarah soon thereafter, leaving the young McGhee brothers orphans. McGhee got a basic education in Freedman's schools, and received his legal education at Knoxville College, graduating in 1885.

== Legal career ==
As a teenager he followed his brothers to Chicago, where he started work as a porter, but within several years became a lawyer associated with Chicago's leading black lawyer of the time, Edward H. Morris.

In 1886 McGhee married Mattie Crane, who was originally from Louisville. Later they had one adopted daughter, Ruth. In 1889 the McGhees moved to St. Paul, Minnesota, where he became the first black lawyer admitted to the bar in that state. He specialized in criminal defense and quickly became one of the most famous trial lawyers in the Twin Cities. As an attorney, McGhee successfully won clemency from President Benjamin Harrison for Lewis Carter, a Black soldier who had been falsely accused of a crime.

== Civil rights advocacy ==
McGhee participated in every local and national civil rights movement of the late 19th and early 20th centuries. He served as a national officer of the National Afro-American Council and organized its national meeting, held in St. Paul, in 1902. At that meeting Booker T. Washington took control of the Council, over McGhee's objections. McGhee broke with Washington and the Council in 1903, and was soon joined by W.E.B. DuBois.

In response, McGhee would join Du Bois in founding the Niagara Movement, in 1905. The Niagara Movement was immediate predecessor of the NAACP, which was founded in 1909. McGhee served as its chief legal officer. In 1912, DuBois gave McGhee credit for creating the Niagara Movement, stating:

"The honor of founding the organization belongs to F. L. McGhee, who first suggested it."

== Political activity ==
McGhee was initially a supporter of the Republican Party like most African Americans at the time. In the Spring of 1892, he was chosen to be a presidential elector by the Minnesota Republican Party. However, Scandinavian Republicans objected to his appointment, and he was replaced before the start of the 1892 Republican National Convention, which was held in Minneapolis in June.

Frustrated and offended by this snub, McGhee changed his allegiance to the Democratic Party in 1893. In doing so, McGhee became one of the first nationally prominent black Democrats, and became a leader in the Negro National Democratic League. McGhee strongly criticized the imperialist views of Republican President William McKinley. McGhee signed onto a letter denouncing McKinley and endorsing Democrat William Jennings Bryan in the 1900 presidential election, which stated:

"We hold that the policy known as imperialism is hostile to liberty and leans toward the destruction of government by the people themselves. We insist that the subjugation of any people is "criminal aggression" and is a pronounced departure from the first principles taught and declared by Washington, Lincoln, Jefferson, and all the great statesmen who have guided the country through as many dangers of the past. Whether the people who will be affected by such policy be or consider themselves Negroes, nor yet because the majority of them are black, is of but little moment. They are by nature entitled to liberty and freedom. We being an oppressed people, to use the words of Daniel O'Connell, should be "the loudest in our protestations against the oppression of others."

== Religious views ==
After moving to Saint Paul, McGhee converted from Baptism to Catholicism at a time when the vast majority of African Americans were Protestants. McGhee admired Archbishop John Ireland's anti-racist views. McGhee joined Ireland in the founding of St Peter Claver Catholic Church, a parish in Saint Paul which exists to this day. McGhee later participated in the Colored Catholic Congresses led by Daniel Rudd.

== Death ==
McGhee died in 1912, at age 50, of complications from a blood clot. He is buried, with his wife and daughter, in Calvary Cemetery in St. Paul. McGhee was honored by his friend Du Bois, who wrote in an obituary for McGhee:

"McGhee was not simply a lawyer... He was a staunch advocate of democracy, and because he knew by bitter experience how his own dark face had served as excuse for discouraging him and discriminating unfairly against him, he became especially an advocate of the rights of colored men."

== See also ==
- List of first minority male lawyers and judges in Minnesota
