= Lena O. Smith House =

Historic house in Minnesota, United States

- U.S. National Register of Historic Places
- Minneapolis Landmark
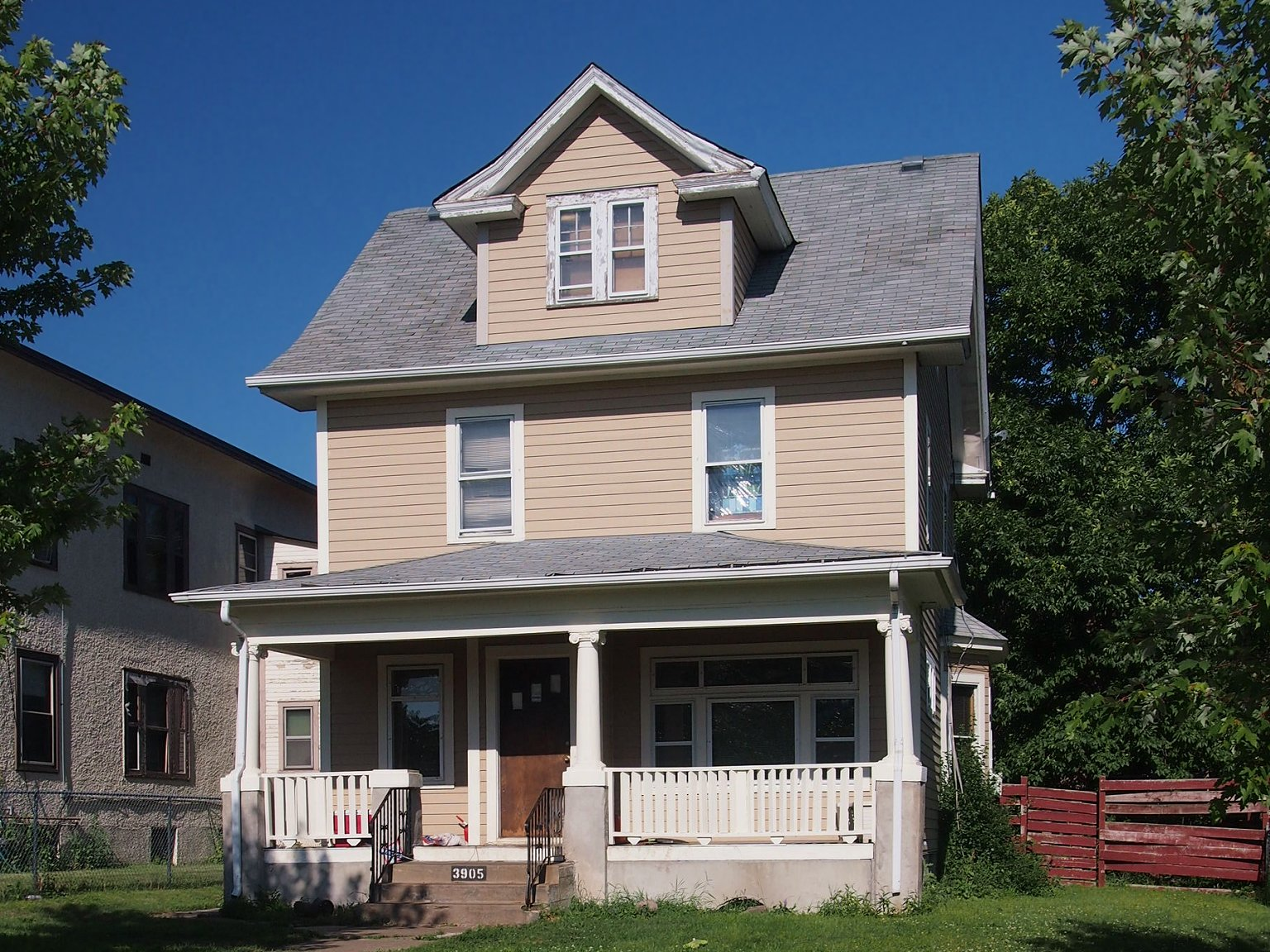
- The Lena O. Smith House from the west-southwest

- Location within Minnesota Location within the United States
- Location: 3905 5th Avenue South, Minneapolis, Minnesota
- Coordinates: 44°55′55.6″N 93°16′6.9″W
- Area: Less than one acre
- Architectural style: Classical Revival
- NRHP reference No.: 91001472

Significant dates
- Added to NRHP: September 26, 1991
- Designated MPLSL: 1996

The Lena O. Smith House is a house in Minneapolis, Minnesota, United States. Its owner, Lena O. Smith, was a prominent civil rights attorney. She was born in 1885 in Lawrence, Kansas and moved with her family to Minneapolis in 1906. She enrolled at William Mitchell College of Law (then the Northwestern College of Law) and graduated in 1921. Afterward, she opened her own law firm and became the first African-American attorney in Minneapolis. In her practice, she fought for issues such as equal protection under the law, equal access to housing, and the right to join labor unions. As an activist, she was a founder of the Minneapolis Urban League, and the first woman president of the Minneapolis chapter of the National Association for the Advancement of Colored People from 1935 through 1939. Her house is listed on the National Register of Historic Places and designated as a local landmark in recognition to the African-American community in Minneapolis.

== See also ==
- National Register of Historic Places listings in Hennepin County, Minnesota
