= Elizabeth A. Hayden =

American lawyer

Elizabeth Ann Hayden is a judge in Stearns County, Minnesota. She was first appointed by Governor Rudy Perpich in 1986. She served as assistant Stearns County attorney from 1981 to 1986. She has served on the Minnesota Supreme Court Advisory Committee on General Rules of Practice. In 2009, she was appointed to preside over the election contest from the United States Senate election in Minnesota, 2008.

She is a graduate of the College of St. Benedict (B.A.) and the Oklahoma City University School of Law (J.D.). She resides in St. Cloud, Minnesota.

Judge Hayden retired from the bench on December 11, 2009.

== See also ==
- List of first women lawyers and judges in Minnesota
