= George H. Jackson (diplomat) =

American diplomat

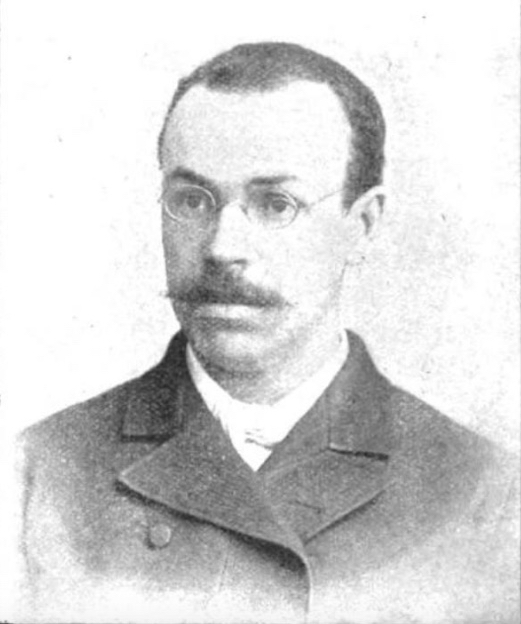

George H. Jackson (February, 28 1863, Natick – 19??) was an American lawyer, consul, and political activist. He is sometimes confused with George Henry Jackson (1846–1925), who was elected to the Ohio State House of Representatives in 1892 and who was appointed treasurer at the founding meeting of the Niagara Movement.

He went to the Congo Free State in 1893 where he served as a medical missionary until 1895.

Jackson was appointed Consul at La Rochelle, France in 1898 to 1908 and then Cognac from 1908 to 1914.

In 1919 he was appointed to the Chicago Commission on Race Relations.
