= Adelbert H. Roberts =

American politician (1866–1937)

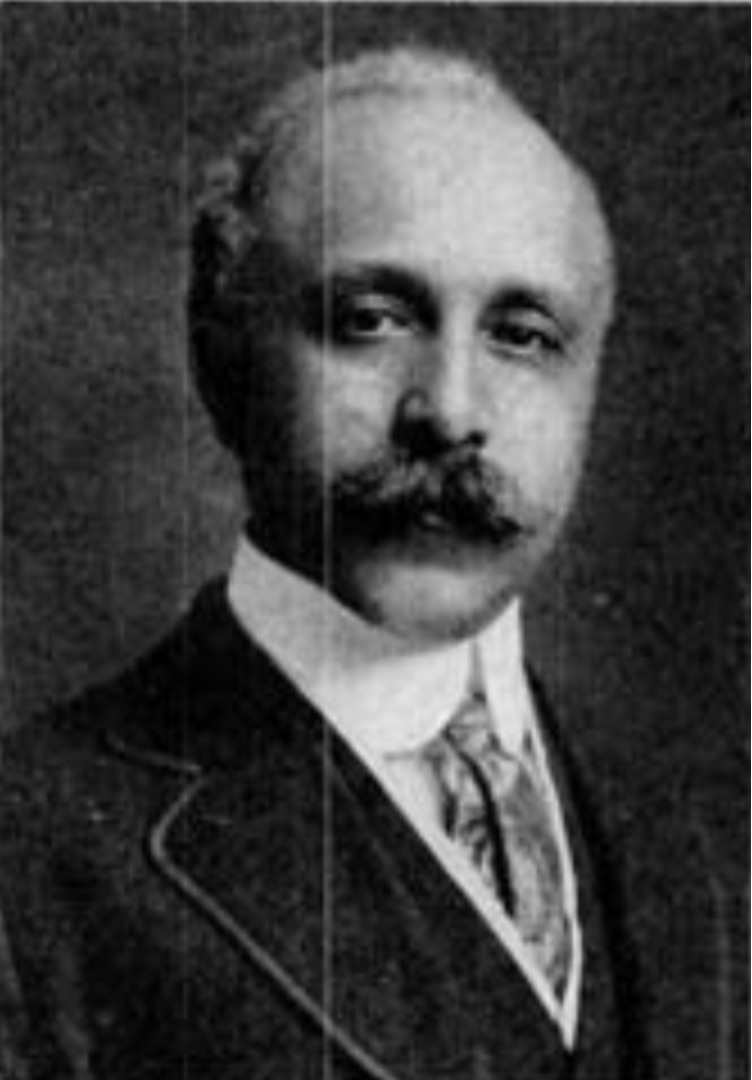
- Roberts in 1925 as State Senator

Member of the Illinois Senate
- In office 1924–1934

Member of the Illinois House of Representatives
- In office 1918–1920

Personal details
- Born: August 20, 1866 Decatur, Michigan, U.S.
- Died: January 26, 1937 (aged 70) Chicago, Illinois, U.S.
- Party: Republican
- Spouse: Lula Wiley (m. 1895)
- Children: 4
- Education: University of Michigan; Northwestern University School of Law
- Occupation: Lawyer, politician

Adelbert H. Roberts (August 20, 1866 – January 26, 1937) was an American politician and attorney who in 1924 became the first African American to serve in the Illinois Senate.

== Biography ==
Roberts was born August 20, 1866, in Decatur, Michigan. He graduated from high school at 17 and became a teacher. He took Ph.D. coursework at University of Michigan before attending Northwestern University School of Law. In 1895, he married Lula Wiley with whom he would have four children.

In 1918, Roberts, a skilled orator, was elected to the Illinois House of Representatives as a Republican. After the Chicago race riot of 1919, Governor Frank Orren Lowden's appointed Roberts, then in his second term on the Senate, to the Chicago Commission on Race Relations created in response to the incident. He used the position to "urge action to address labor and housing discrimination in Chicago". His civil rights activism extended to his being a close friend of civil rights pioneer Booker T. Washington.

Said to be concerned with the morals of those he represented, he was on the Liquor Commission. He was appointed to the Illinois Senate in 1924 to fill a vacancy and elected to the Senate in 1926 and 1930 where he served as chairman of the criminal procedures committee. During his tenure in the Senate, he was a resident of the Douglas community area (the 3rd district). In 1987, a statue honoring him was commissioned and displayed on the second floor of the state capitol rotunda.

Roberts died January 26, 1937, in Chicago.

In 1984, Senator Margaret Smith and Representative Howard B. Brookins Sr. successfully campaigned to have a statue of Roberts installed in the Capitol rotunda.
