= Harriet Lansing =

American lawyer

Harriet Lansing (born May 19, 1945) is an American lawyer, feminist, and a former judge on the Ramsey County Municipal Court (1978–83) and the Minnesota Court of Appeals (1983–2011).

== Early life and education ==
Harriet Lansing was born in rural Wisconsin and attended a one-room country school. She earned her undergraduate degree in 1967 in Political Science from Macalester College. She was one of ten women in her class at the University of Minnesota Law School where she earned her J.D. in 1970. She is married to Allan Klein, a retired attorney and administrative law judge.

As she describes herself in her oral history: "My early life experience provided me with a deep appreciation for the importance of community, the transformational power of words and literature, liberation of work, and the fundamental value of fairness. I would add to that list also the love of tall trees, fresh air and a good pair of hiking boots."

== Career ==
In 1972 she worked for the St. Paul City Attorney's Office. She opened the first women's law firm in 1973: Lansing, Oakes and Caperton. Rosalie Wahl and other members of Minnesota Women Lawyers referred clients. In 1976 she was appointed to be St. Paul's first woman City Attorney. (Only eight cities had women city attorneys at that time.)

Governor Rudy Perpich appointed her to the Ramsey County Municipal Court in 1978, the first woman on that court, and the only woman to serve during her five years there. In 1983, Governor Perpich appointed her as one of the first six judges (two of whom were women) on the newly created Minnesota Court of Appeals where she served for 28 years, winning five elections and writing more than 2000 opinions. She retired in 2011.

== Impact on the law ==
Judge Lansing was a founding member of Minnesota Women Lawyers in 1972 and the recipient of its Myra Bradwell award in 2003. She was the vice chair for the Gender Fairness Task Force, chaired by Justice Rosalie E. Wahl. She chaired and helped to establish the Family Law Mediation Program.

The U.S. Supreme Court affirmed the opinion she wrote in the 1993 case of Growe et al. v. Emison et al. holding that the federal courts had improperly enjoined the state court's redistricting plan.

Judge Lansing taught as an adjunct faculty member at William Mitchell College of Law and Hamline University Law School, and at the Appellate Judges Institute at New York University. She chaired the University of Minnesota Law School's Board of Visitors.

She joined the Uniform Law Commission in 1993, served as chair of the Commission's Executive Committee from 2011 to 2013 and as President from 2013 to 2015.

In 2015 she became a Fellow of the European Law Institute and was the keynote speaker for the Institute's Annual Conference and General Assembly in Vienna, Austria. In 2018 she also delivered the keynote speech for the Institute at its annual meeting in Riga, Latvia. From 2015 to 2018 she served as a member of the United States delegation to the United Nations Commission on International Trade Law on Enforcement of International Commercial Settlement Agreements.
