= Susanne C. Sedgwick =

Minnesota lawyer and judge

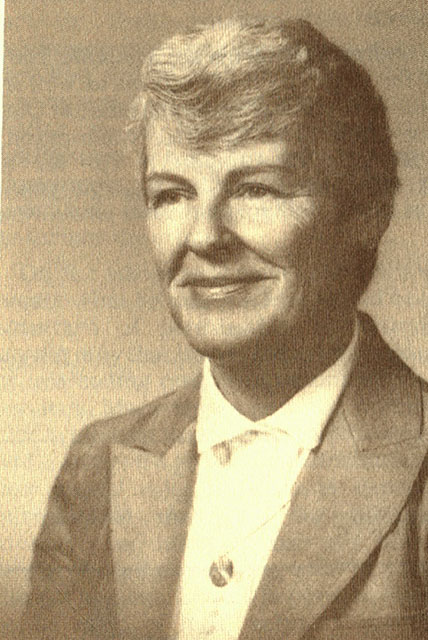
- Susanne C. Sedgwick

Associate Judge of the Minnesota Court of Appeals William Mitchell College of Law
- In office Rudy Perpich
- Preceded by: Harry H. MacLaughlin
- Succeeded by: Marianne D. Short

Personal details
- Born: Susanne Carroll; June 10, 1931
- Died: April 8, 1988 (aged 56) St. Paul, Minnesota, U.S.
- Spouse: Albert Sedgwick (m. 1955)
- Education: University of Minnesota

Susanne C. Sedgwick (June 10, 1931 – April 8, 1988) was a legal aid lawyer and judge from Minnesota. She was the first woman Assistant Hennepin County Attorney, the second woman municipal court judge in Minnesota, the first woman Hennepin County District Court Judge, one of the first judges appointed to the newly created Minnesota Court of Appeals, and a contender for the first woman federal district court from Minnesota and the first woman on the Minnesota Supreme Court.

== Biography ==
Susanne Carroll was born on June 10, 1931, in Minneapolis, Minnesota. The alcoholism of her parents led to her spending time in foster care and her father went on to help found and direct the Hazelton Clinic. Sedgwick supported Roe v. Wade and elected coordinator of the bipartisan Minnesota Women's Political Caucus.

Sedgwick earned her undergraduate degree from the University of Minnesota and her law degree from William Mitchell College of Law in 1956. Sedgwick married her husband, a banker, while in law school and gave birth to her daughter during the Christmas break. She was sworn into the bar shortly before delivering her son and had two other children.

== Career ==
Sedgwick's law school instructor and District Court Douglas Amdahl encouraged her to volunteer with the legal aid society and chief staff attorney Harlan Smith quickly hired her. Sedgwick worked as a legal aid lawyer for 3 1/2 years and then as Assistant Hennepin County Attorney, the first woman, handling juvenile delinquency and child custody cases. In 1970, at age 39, she ran against a 68-year-old sitting municipal court judge which was highly unusual. (An incumbent judge had not been defeated since 1959). A pleblicite of the Hennepin County Bar showed more lawyers supported her (795 to 647) than Judge Estrem who failed to earn the support of younger members and refused to debate Sedgwick or appear with her in a public forum to answer questions. Sedgwick criticized the bloc voting system on the ballot that encouraged lawyers to endorse all incumbent judges as a group and claimed many lawyers had returned their ballots before they knew she was running. Her 180 public supporters included the state public defender, Robert Oliphant, who often appeared in municipal court. She won the election and a seat as a Minneapolis Municipal Court Judge, defeating an incumbent, Herbert Estrem (85,164 votes to 63,745). When she assumed the bench, she was the only woman sitting judge in Minnesota.

Sedgwick chaired the committee on family law for the Hennepin County Bar Association that helped draft the legislation setting up a family law division of the Hennepin County District Court. William Mitchell students had written en masse to the Governor urging him to appoint women. Governor Wendell Anderson appointed her to head the Family Division of the Fourth Judicial District Court in 1974. She replaced Judge Paul Lommen. Governor Al Quie declared her honorary chairperson of Minnesota's efforts to commemorate the UN Year of the Child in 1979. In 1982, she became president of the United Way of Minneapolis.

Five women's groups (Minnesota Women Lawyers, Minnesota Women's Political Caucus, GOP Feminist Caucus, Hennepin County Women's Political Caucus, and Les Soeurs and Administrative Women in Education) came together to endorse only Sedgwick when U.S. Chief District Judge Edward Devitt announced he was taking senior status on May 1, 1981, creating a vacancy. A merit selection panel would recommend five names to the two Minnesota senators to forward to the U.S. Attorney General. The fifty-member strong women's coalition criticized the panel for recommending five men. President Ronald Reagan appointed Paul Magnuson. Minnesota Women Lawyers, the Minnesota Women's Political Caucus, the GOP Feminist Caucus, and the DFL Feminist Caucus joined forces to recommend that President Jimmy Carter select her for one of the newly created federal district court positions. They noted that only 11 of 525 federal judges were women, that Carter had appointed only 6 women out of 62 appointments, and that before President Carter took office, only 11 women had ever served on a federal court. The nominating commission forwarded to Carter the names of ten men.

In 1983, Governor Rudy Perpich appointed her to be one of the first six judges (one of two women) on the newly created Minnesota Court of Appeals. Minnesota Women Lawyers put her on their short list of favored candidates to be the first woman on the Minnesota Supreme Court. Justice Rosalie Wahl said that Sedgwick should have been the first woman to serve on the Minnesota Supreme Court but Democrats believed (wrongly) she was a Republican. (One press account did identify her as a "lukewarm Republican.") Supreme Court Justice Douglas Amdahl credited Sedgwick with "wiping out many of the hurdles that once faced women lawyers." Minnesota Women Lawyers gave her the Myra Bradwell award in 1984. The Ramsay County Women's Political Caucus selected her as a Founding Feminist.

Judge Sedgwick resigned her position in February 1988 and, after an eight-year battle, died in April of cancer.
