= Tony N. Leung =

American judge (born 1959)

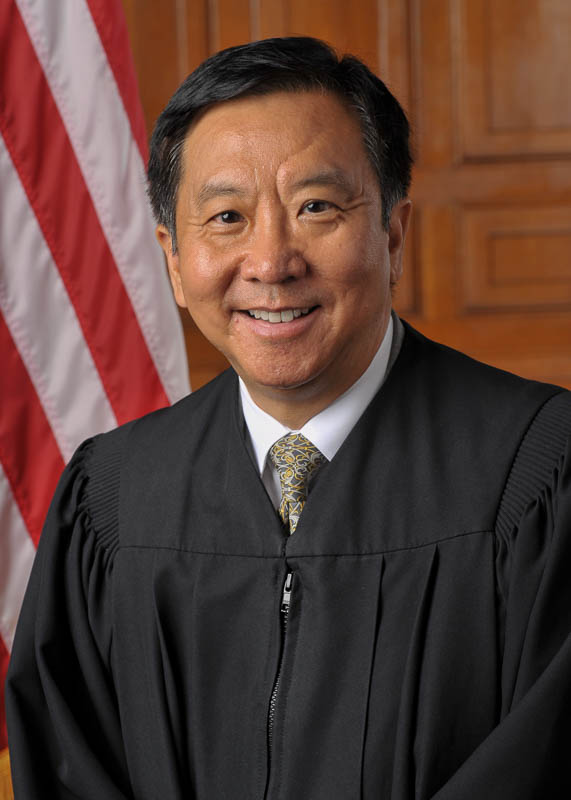

Magistrate Judge of the United States District Court for the District of Minnesota
- Incumbent
- Assumed office April 30, 2011

Judge of the Fourth Judicial District of Minnesota
- In office 1994–2011

Personal details
- Born: August 16, 1959 (age 67) Hong Kong
- Education: Yale University (BA); New York University (JD)

Tony N. Leung (simplified Chinese: 梁栋宁; traditional Chinese: 梁棟寧; born August 16, 1959) is a United States magistrate judge of the United States District Court for the District of Minnesota.

Leung is the first Asian Pacific American judge in Minnesota. In 1994, he was appointed as a District Court Judge for the Fourth Judicial District of Minnesota by Minnesota Governor Arne H. Carlson. He served in that capacity as a general jurisdiction trial judge until he was appointed to the federal bench in 2011, becoming the first Asian Pacific American to serve as a federal judge in Minnesota.

== Early life ==
Born in Hong Kong to parents from Taishan, Guangdong, China, Leung emigrated at age six with his family to the United States in 1966. He lived one year in Aurora, Illinois, learning to speak English before moving to Minneapolis, Minnesota, residing south of the Lyn-Lake area.

== Education ==
He attended Minneapolis Public Schools and graduated as co-valedictorian and president of the student council in 1978 from West High School. In 1982, he graduated with honors from Yale University, where he received a BA in political science, was co-captain of the Yale Tae Kwon-Do Club, and studied at Beijing University in the summer of 1981. He received his JD from New York University School of Law in 1985.

== Career ==
Leung returned to Minnesota to practice at Faegre & Benson, where he was an equity partner focusing on real estate and other business transactions until he joined the state bench.

On July 29, 1994, Leung became Minnesota’s first judge of Asian descent when he was appointed a District Court Judge on Minnesota’s Fourth Judicial District in Hennepin County, replacing the Honorable Michael J. Davis, who had been appointed as a United States District Judge for the District of Minnesota. Leung, who was re-elected in 1996, 2002 and 2008, presided over a wide variety of subjects, including civil, criminal, child protection and juvenile delinquency cases.

On April 30, 2011, Leung was sworn in as a United States magistrate judge for the United States District Court for the District of Minnesota. His magistrate judgeship was newly created in 2011. His duties include civil and criminal proceedings as well as naturalization ceremonies. He was appointed to his first eight-year term by District Judges of the United States District Court for the District of Minnesota and appointed to a second eight-year term in 2019.

Leung served as the President of the Federal Bar Association Minnesota Chapter from 2019-2020. He was one of the co-founders of Minnesota's Chapter of the National Asian Pacific American Bar Association in 1990. He has served on the board of Twin Cities RISE! for 25 years, beginning in 1995, and as Chair of the Yale Alumni Schools Committee in Minneapolis since 1991. He was a co-founder and first Board Chair of Twin Cities Diversity in Practice in 2005. He is or has been on the boards of Wishes & More, Northern Star Council, Boy Scouts of America, and Lakewood Cemetery Association. He has been a lecturer as part of the University of St. Thomas's Great Books Seminar for business and law students since 1998.

== See also ==
- List of Asian American jurists
- List of first minority male lawyers and judges in Minnesota
