= Minnesota State Bar Association =

- Type: Legal Society
- Headquarters: Minneapolis, MN
- Location: United States
- Members: 15,744 in 2012
- Website: http://mnbar.org/

The Minnesota State Bar Association is a voluntary bar association for the state of Minnesota, whose members include lawyers, judges, and other legal practitioners, such as clerks, registrars, and paralegals. The MSBA is one of the oldest state bar associations in the United States. Membership is not required to practice law in Minnesota.

== Purposes ==
The MSBA states the following goals:

- To aid the courts in the administration of justice.
- To apply the knowledge and experience of the profession to the public good.
- To maintain in the profession high standards of learning, competence, ethics, and public service.
- To conduct a program of continuing legal education.
- To organize into the MSBA the entire Bench and Bar of Minnesota and correlate the activities of affiliated associations.
- To provide a forum for the discussion of subjects pertaining to the practice of law, the science of jurisprudence and law reform, and to publish information relating thereof.
- To cooperate with other bar associations and organizations to further MSBA objectives.

== History and Organization ==
On April 3, 1883, a group of lawyers met to consider formation of a state bar association. Within a month a constitution and bylaws were adopted; charter members paid three dollars with annual dues of two dollars per year. In 1926, the association adopted an affiliated district bar plan and also a new constitution. A public relations committee was appointed in 1937 to air a radio program nationwide and encourage other states to participate. In 2001, the MSBA elected its first African American as president, Jarvis Jones. Today, the MSBA governance structure includes a policy making body, the "Assembly", and a board of directors, the "Council".

== Projects and publications ==
Projects of the MSBA include a variety of services and Web sites.

- PracticeLaw.org is a resource for practicing attorneys, which provides forms and guides to help lawyers practice more efficiently and effectively.
- Minnesota CLE (at MinnCLE.org) is a source of hundreds of continuing legal education offerings for lawyers and other legal practitioners.
- Bench & Bar is a legal magazine published by the MSBA. The publication includes articles written by legal practitioners on topics in law and legal ethics, updates and notes on recent court decisions and changes in statutes, announcements by lawyers and law firms, and news on current legal issues and events.

== Officers ==
Approximately every four years, the MSBA Assembly elects officers from the Hennepin County Bar Association, the Ramsey County Bar Association, the outstate bar associations (collectively), and a single at-large position. The officer is elected as Secretary, then advances to Treasurer, and then President-Elect, and eventually President.

== Directors ==
The directors of the MSBA, under the guidance of the executive director, have the responsibility of carrying out the day-to-day operations of the association. The directors are responsible for supervising staff and setting and communicating goals and standards.
