= List of University of Minnesota people =

This is a list of notable people associated with the University of Minnesota, a public land-grant research university in the Twin Cities of Minneapolis and Saint Paul, Minnesota, United States. It is the flagship institution of the University of Minnesota System

== Alumni ==
=== Nobel laureates ===
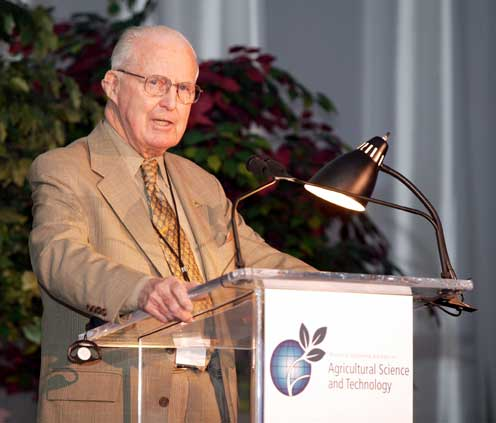
Norman Borlaug

- Ernest O. Lawrence (M.A. Physics 1923), 1939 Nobel Prize in Physics
- Walter Brattain (PhD Physics 1929), 1956 Nobel Prize in Physics
- Melvin Calvin (PhD Chemistry 1935), 1961 Nobel Prize in Chemistry
- Norman Borlaug (B.S. Forestry 1937, M.S. 1939 Plant Pathology, PhD 1942 Plant Pathology), 1970 Nobel Peace Prize
- Edward B. Lewis (M.A. Biostatistics 1939), 1995 Nobel Prize in Physiology or Medicine
- Louis J. Ignarro (PhD Pharmacology 1966), 1998 Nobel Prize in Physiology or Medicine
- Daniel McFadden (B.S. Physics 1957, PhD Economics 1962), 2000 Nobel Prize in Economic Sciences
- Brian Kobilka (B.S. Biology and Chemistry 1977), 2012 Nobel Prize in Chemistry
- Lars Peter Hansen (PhD Economics 1978), 2013 Nobel Prize in Economic Sciences
- Bob Dylan, singer/songwriter (did not graduate), 2016 Nobel Prize in Literature

=== Pulitzer Prize winners ===
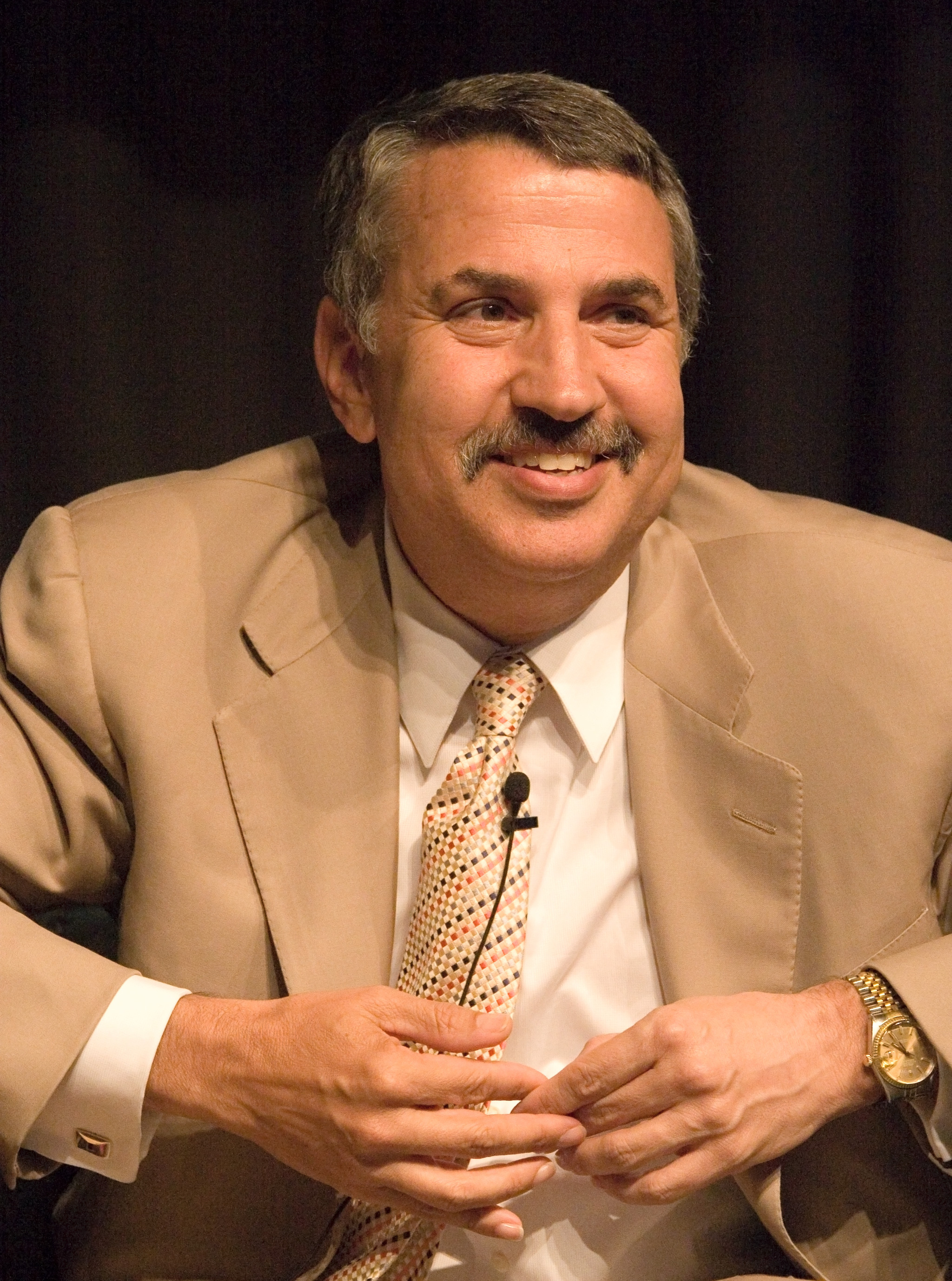
Thomas Friedman

- Carl Dennis, Pulitzer Prize winner in 2002 for Poetry
- Thomas Friedman, Pulitzer Prize winner in 1983 and 1988 for International Reporting and 2002 for Commentary; studied at the University of Minnesota from 1971 to 1973 before transferring to Brandeis University
- Rob Kuznia, winner of Pulitzer Prize for Local Reporting in 2015

=== Law and politics ===
==== Vice presidents ====
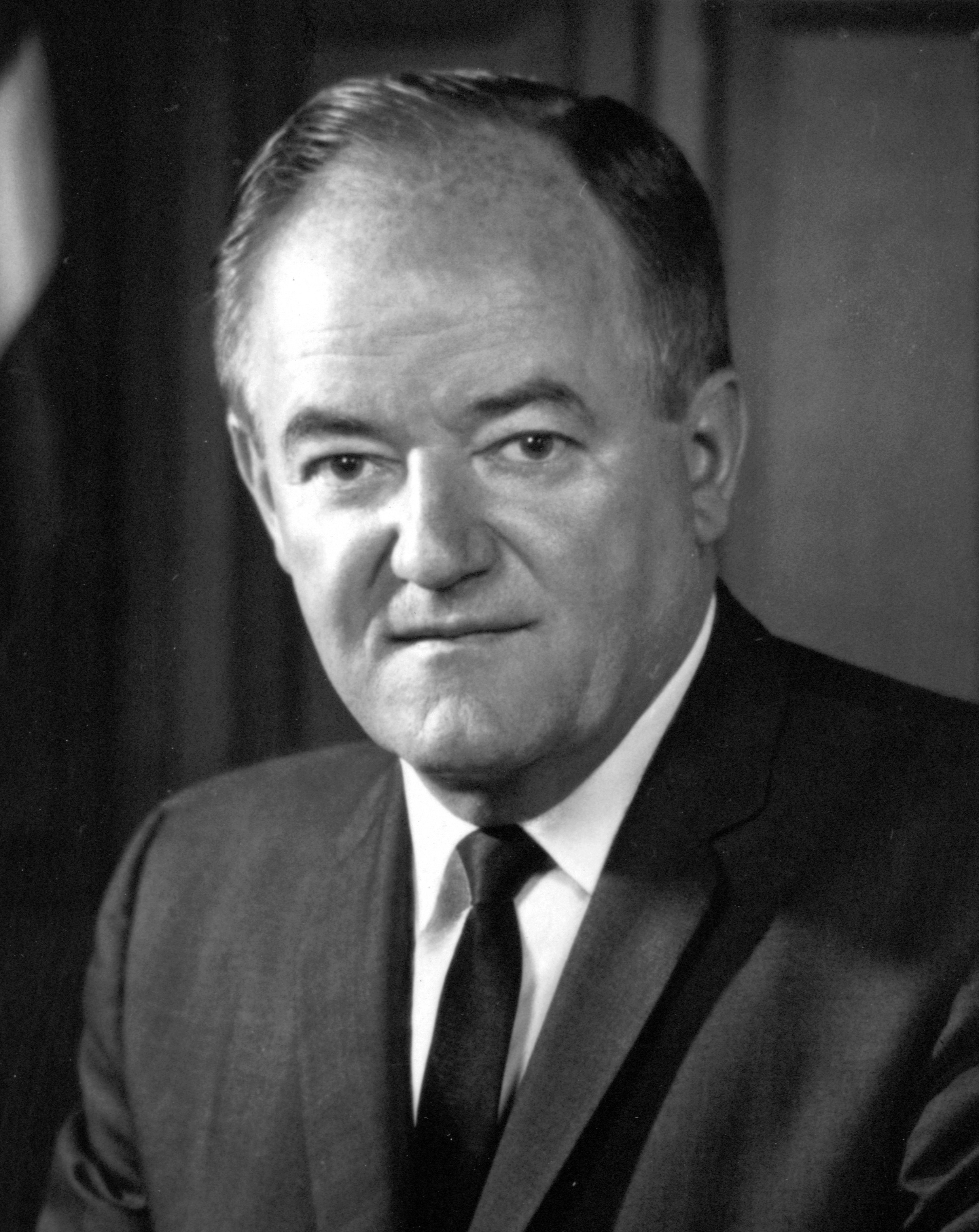
Hubert Humphrey

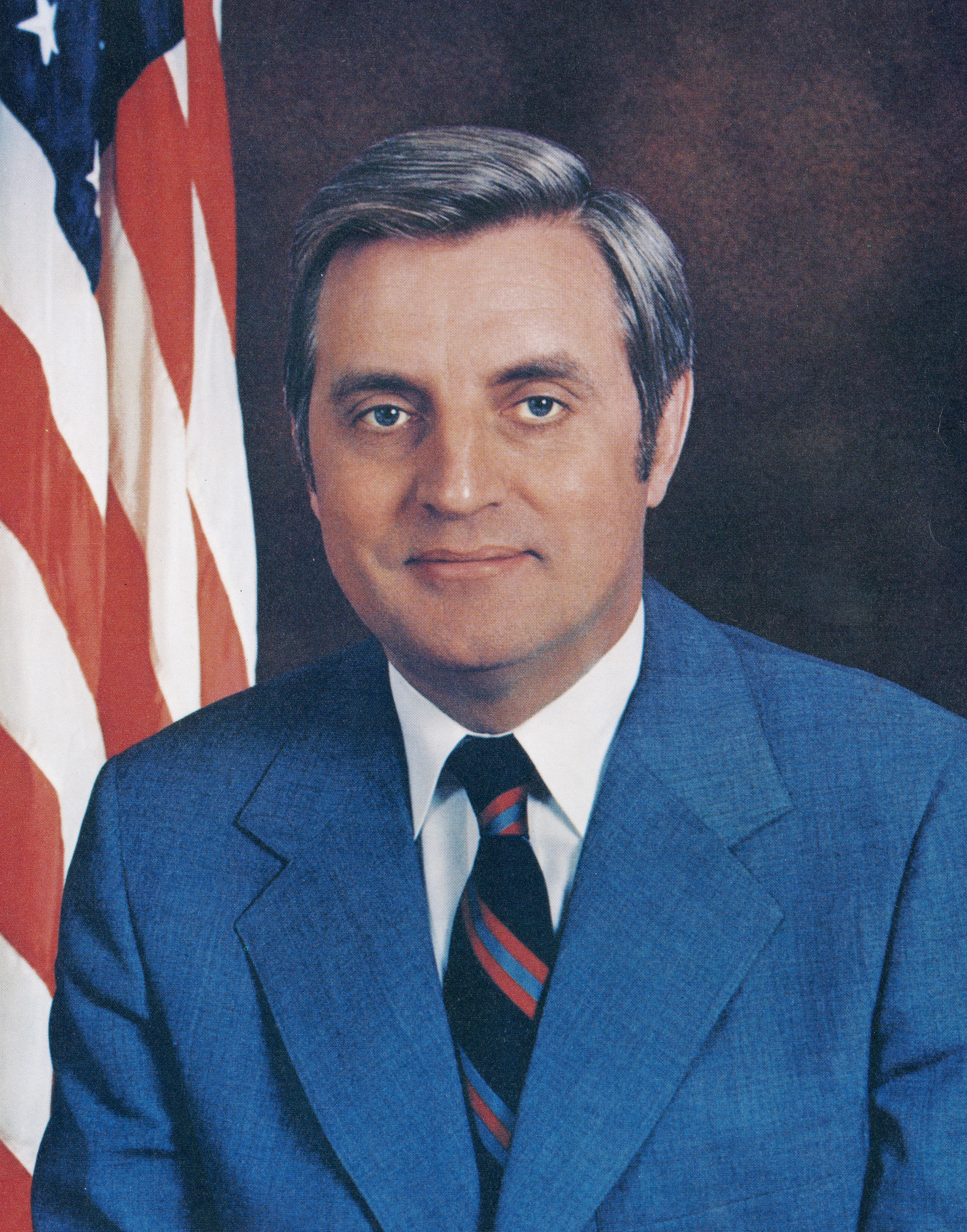
Walter Mondale

- Hubert H. Humphrey, former U.S. vice president and 1968 Democratic nominee for president
- Walter Mondale, former U.S. vice president and 1984 Democratic nominee for president

==== Cabinet members and diplomats ====
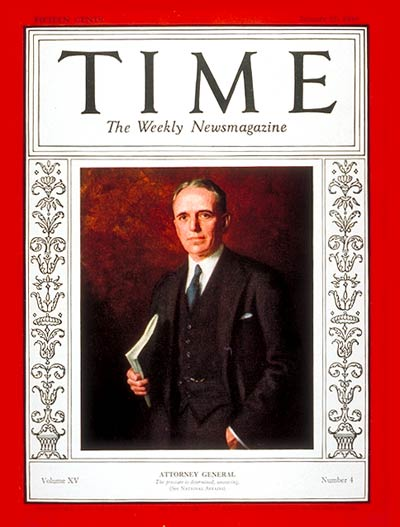
William D. Mitchell

- Robert Bergland, former U.S. secretary of agriculture
- James Blanchard, former U.S. ambassador to Canada
- Jeffrey Davidow, former U.S. ambassador to Mexico, Zambia, and Venezuela
- William Dawson, former U.S. ambassador to Uruguay and Panama
- Scott H. DeLisi, former U.S. ambassador to Eritrea, Nepal and Uganda
- Orville Freeman, former U.S. secretary of agriculture
- William Garvelink, former U.S. ambassador to the Democratic Republic of the Congo
- James Day Hodgson, former U.S. secretary of labor and U.S. ambassador to Japan
- Darryl N. Johnson, former U.S. ambassador to Thailand
- Geri M. Joseph, journalist, former U.S. ambassador to the Netherlands
- Samuel L. Kaplan, former U.S. ambassador to Morocco
- Tom McDonald, former U.S. ambassador to Zimbabwe
- Ronald K. McMullen, former U.S. ambassador to Eritrea
- William D. Mitchell, former attorney general of the United States
- Walter Mondale, former U.S. ambassador to Japan
- Robert G. Neumann, former diplomat
- Donald R. Norland, former U.S. ambassador
- Carl Stokes, former U.S. ambassador to Seychelles
- Dave Uejio, former acting director of the Consumer Financial Protection Bureau
- Benson Whitney, former U.S. ambassador to Norway
- Ross Wilson, former U.S. ambassador to Turkey
- Robert F. Woodward, former diplomat

==== Members of Congress ====
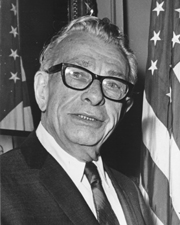
Everett Dirksen

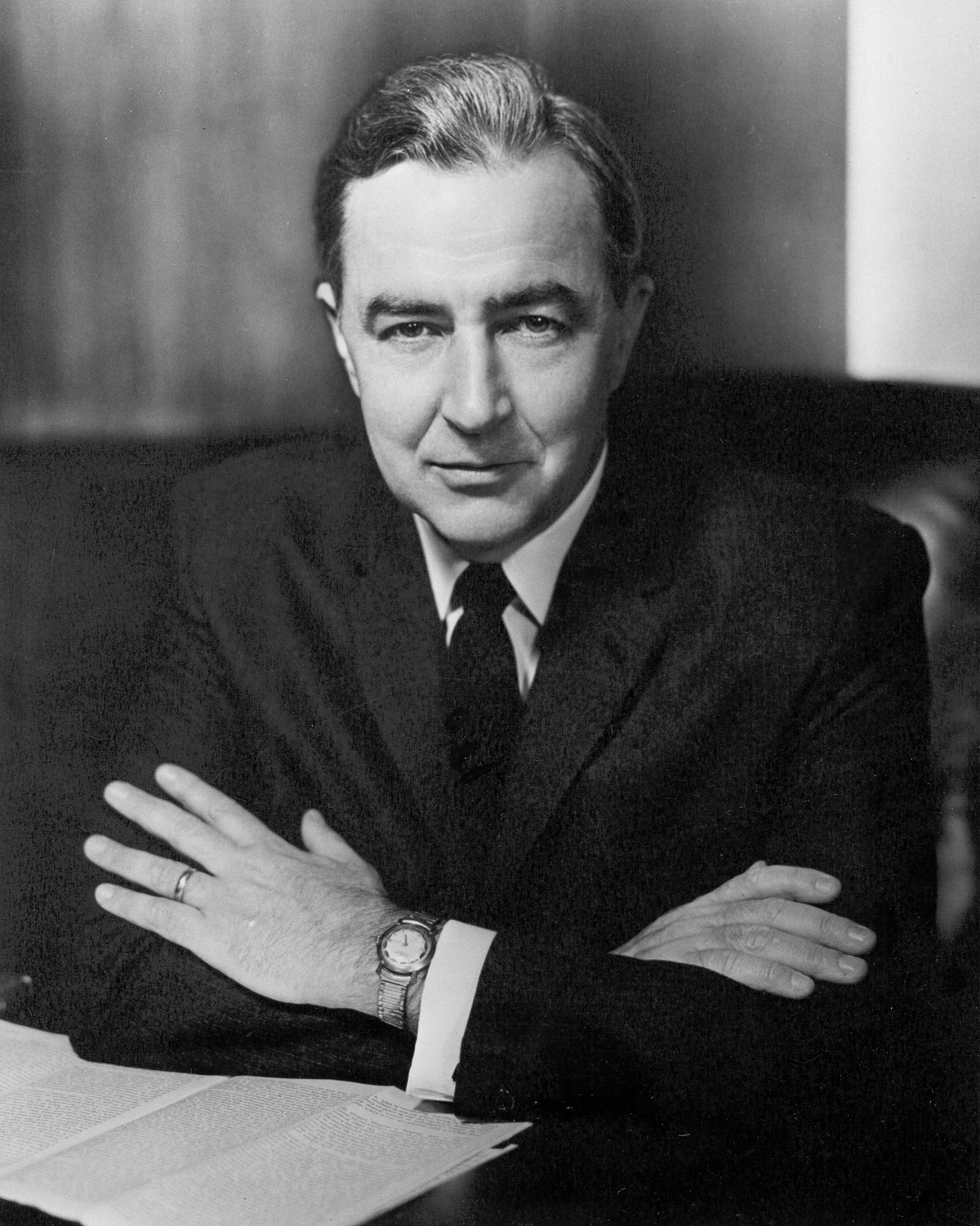
Eugene McCarthy

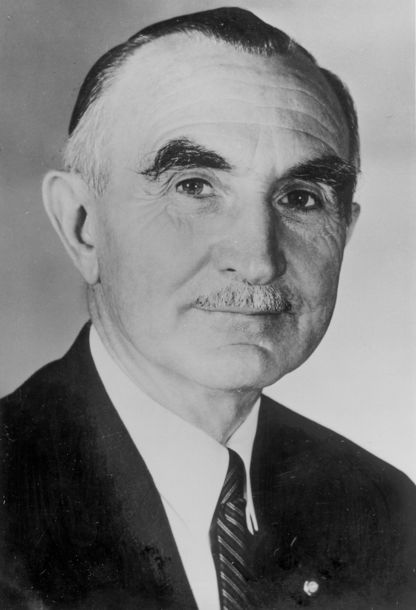
Wayne Morse

- Sydney Anderson, former U.S. representative
- Wendell R. Anderson, former U.S. senator (DFL-MN)
- William L. Armstrong, former U.S. representative and U.S. senator
- Joseph H. Ball, former U.S. senator (R-MN)
- Dean Barkley, former U.S. senator (I-MN)
- Nick Begich, former U.S. representative
- Fred Biermann, former U.S. representative
- Quentin Burdick, former U.S. senator (D-ND)
- Usher L. Burdick, former U.S. representative
- Harlan J. Bushfield, former U.S. senator
- Vera C. Bushfield, former U.S. senator
- Ray P. Chase, former U.S. congressman (R-MN)
- Victor Christgau, former U.S. congressman (R-MN)
- Frank E. Denholm, former U.S. representative
- Everett Dirksen, former U.S. senator
- David Durenberger, former U.S. senator (R-MN)
- Keith Ellison, former U.S. congressman (DFL-MN)
- Franklin Ellsworth, former U.S. representative
- Brad Finstad, U.S. representative (R-MN)
- Donald M. Fraser, former U.S. congressman (DFL-MN)
- Richard Pillsbury Gale, former U.S. representative
- Godfrey Goodwin, former U.S. congressman (R-MN)
- Knute Hill, former U.S. representative
- Einar Hoidale, former U.S. congressman (DFL-MN)
- Dewey Johnson, former U.S. representative
- Ron Johnson, U.S. senator (R-WI)
- Ron Kind, U.S. congressman (D-WI)
- Paul John Kvale, former U.S. representative
- Rick Larsen, U.S. representative (D-WA)
- John Linder, former U.S. congressman (R-GA)
- Ernest Lundeen, former U.S. senator
- Bill Luther, former U.S. congressman (DFL-MN)
- Melvin Maas, former U.S. representative
- William Josiah MacDonald, former U.S. representative
- Clark MacGregor, former U.S. representative
- James Manahan, former U.S. representative
- Eugene McCarthy, former U.S. congressman, U.S. senator and three-time presidential candidate (DFL-MN)
- John Melcher, former U.S. senator
- Clarence B. Miller, former U.S. representative
- Wayne Morse, former U.S. senator (R/I/D-OR)
- Walter Newton, former U.S. representative
- Jim Ramstad, former U.S. congressman (R-MN)
- John H. Ray, former U.S. representative
- Jacky Rosen, U.S. senator (D-NV), former U.S. representative (D-NV)
- Elmer Ryan, former U.S. representative
- Martin Olav Sabo, former U.S. representative
- Thomas D. Schall, former U.S. senator (R-MN)
- Patricia Schroeder, former U.S. congresswoman (D-CO)
- Conrad Selvig, former U.S. representative
- Don L. Short, former U.S. representative
- Gerald Edward Sikorski, former U.S. representative
- George Ross Smith, former U.S. representative
- Henry O. Talle, former U.S. representative
- Bruce Vento, former U.S. congressman (DFL-MN)
- Vin Weber, former U.S. congressman (R-MN)
- George M. Young, former U.S. representative
- Edward Zorinsky, former U.S. senator
- John M. Zwach, former U.S. representative

==== Governors ====
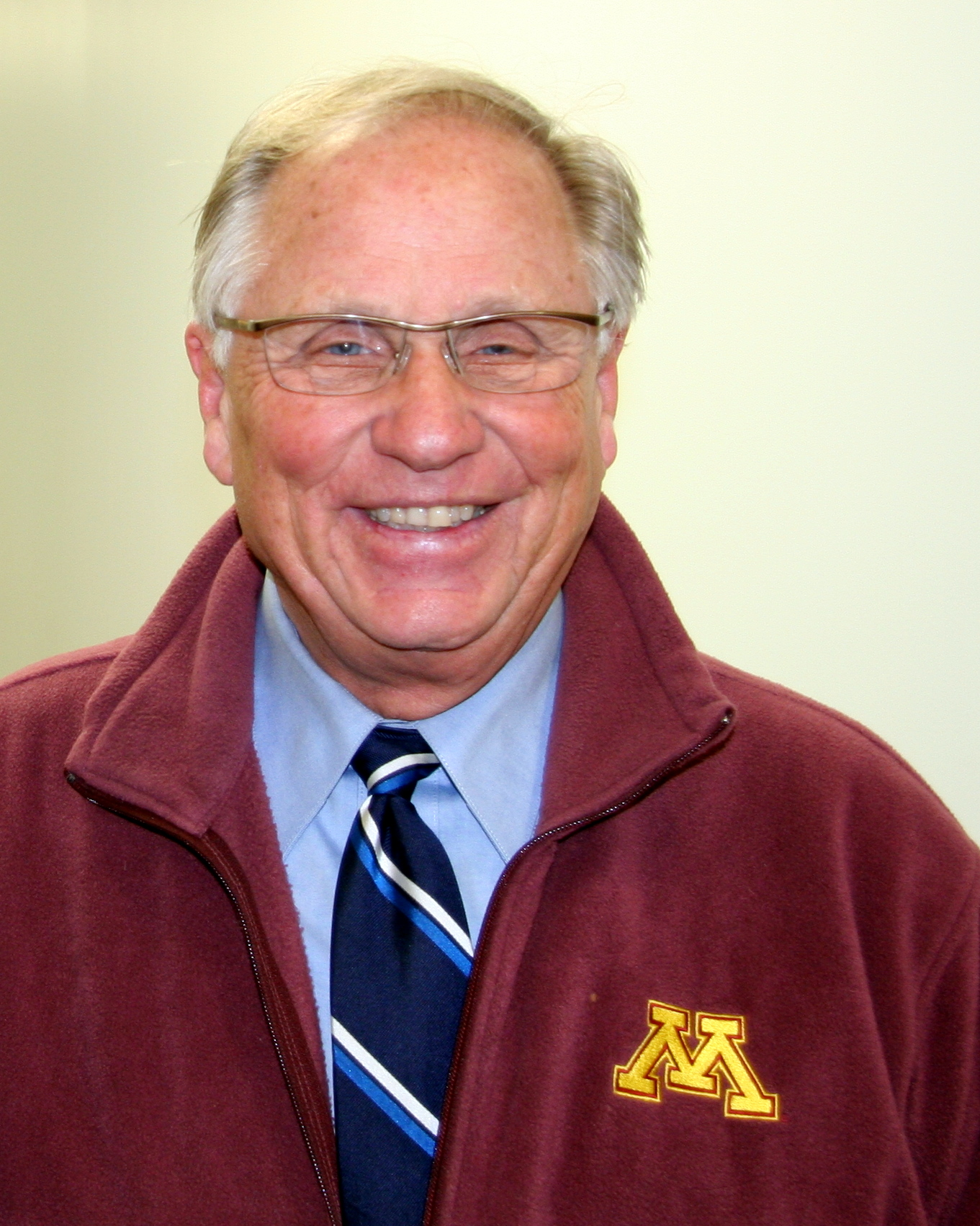
Arne Carlson

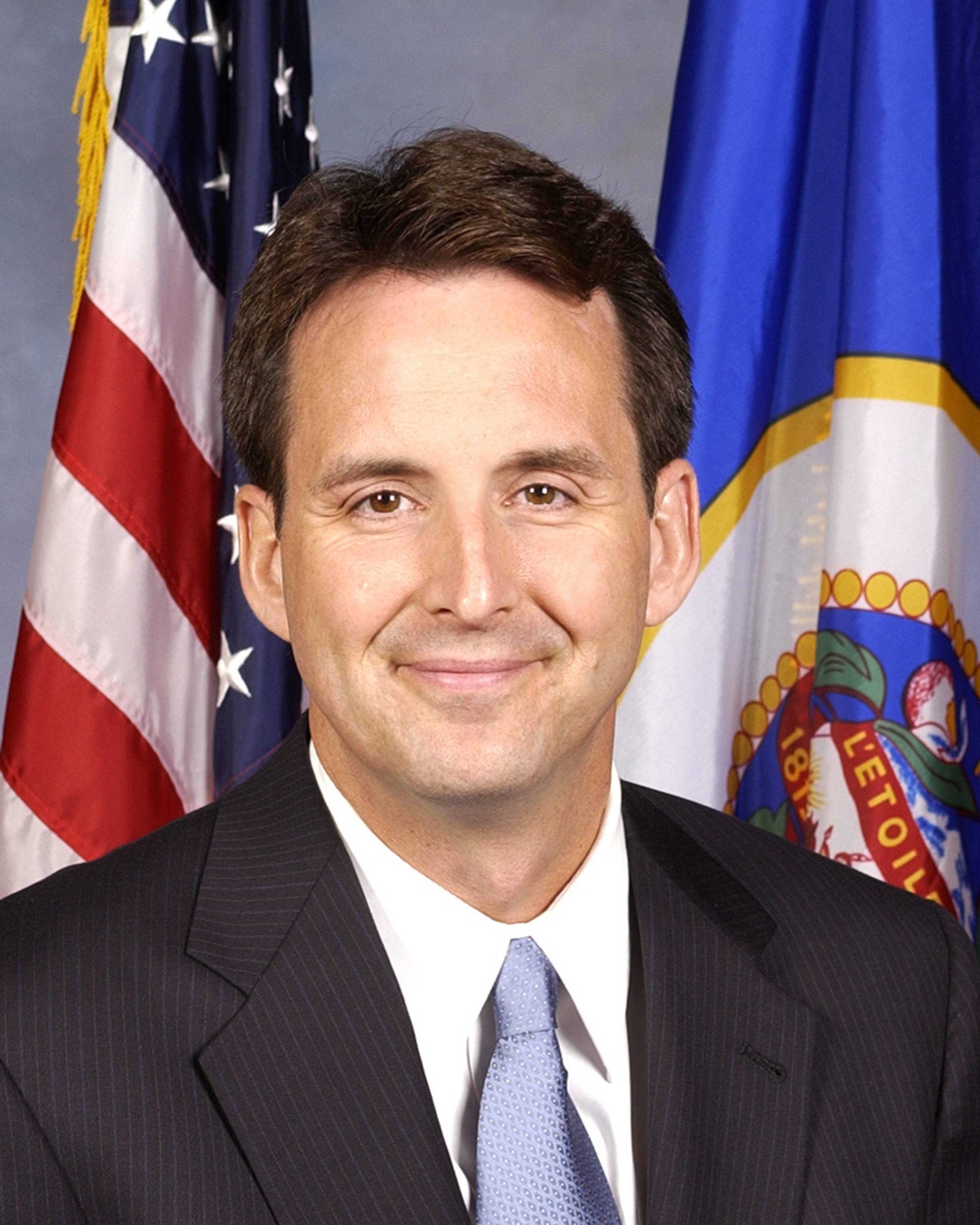
Tim Pawlenty

- Elmer L. Andersen, former governor of Minnesota
- C. Elmer Anderson, former governor of Minnesota
- Wendell Anderson, former governor of Minnesota
- James Blanchard, former governor of Michigan
- Joseph A.A. Burnquist, former governor of Minnesota
- Harlan J. Bushfield, former governor of South Dakota
- Arne Carlson, former governor of Minnesota
- Theodore Christianson, former governor of Minnesota
- Robert B. Crosby, former governor of Nebraska
- Charles M. Dale, former governor of New Hampshire
- Orville Freeman, former governor of Minnesota
- William L. Guy, former governor of North Dakota
- Harold LeVander, former governor of Minnesota
- John Lind, former governor of Minnesota
- Floyd B. Olson, former governor of Minnesota
- Tim Pawlenty, former governor of Minnesota
- J.A.O. Preus, former governor of Minnesota
- Harold Stassen, former governor of Minnesota
- Charles W. Turnbull, former governor, U.S. Virgin Islands

==== Article III judges ====
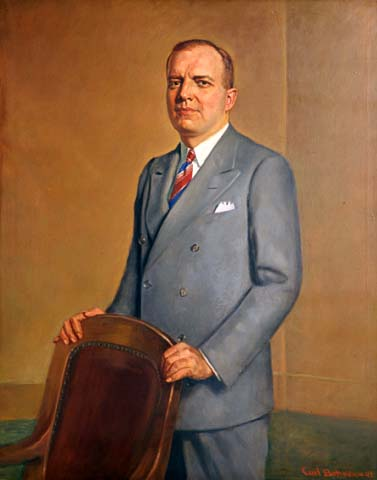
Harold Stassen

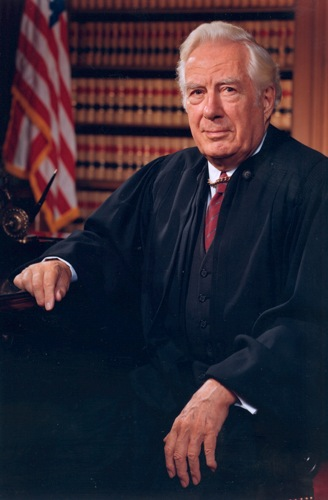
Warren Burger

- Donald Alsop, judge, U.S. District Court for the District of Minnesota
- Mosher Joseph Blumenfeld, former judge, U.S. District Court for the District of Connecticut
- Nancy E. Brasel, federal judge
- Myron H. Bright, senior judge, U.S. Court of Appeals for the Eighth Circuit
- Warren E. Burger, former chief justice of the U.S. Supreme Court
- William Canby, judge, U.S. Court of Appeals for the Ninth Circuit
- Michael J. Davis, chief judge, U.S. District Court for the District of Minnesota
- David S. Doty, judge, U.S. District Court for the District of Minnesota
- Joan N. Ericksen, judge, U.S. District Court for the District of Minnesota
- Henry Norman Graven, former judge, U.S. District Court for the Northern District of Iowa
- Gerald Heaney, former judge, U.S. Court of Appeals for the Eighth Circuit
- Richard H. Kyle, judge, U.S. District Court for the District of Minnesota
- Earl R. Larson, former judge, U.S. District Court for the District of Minnesota
- Miles Lord, former judge, U.S. District Court for the District of Minnesota
- Brett H. Ludwig, federal judge
- Claude Luse, former judge, U.S. District Court for the Western District of Wisconsin
- George MacKinnon, former judge, U.S. Court of Appeals for the District of Columbia Circuit
- Harry H. MacLaughlin, former judge, U.S. District Court for the District of Minnesota
- Ann D. Montgomery, judge, U.S. District Court for the District of Minnesota
- Diana E. Murphy, judge, U.S. Court of Appeals for the Eighth Circuit
- Philip Neville, former judge, U.S. District Court for the District of Minnesota
- Gunnar Nordbye, former judge, U.S. District Court for the District of Minnesota
- Milton D. Purdy, former judge, U.S. District Court for the District of Minnesota
- James M. Rosenbaum, judge, U.S. District Court for the District of Minnesota
- John B. Sanborn, Jr., former judge, U.S. Court of Appeals for the Eighth Circuit
- George F. Sullivan, former judge, U.S. District Court for the District of Minnesota
- John R. Tunheim, judge, U.S. District Court for the District of Minnesota
- Bruce Marion Van Sickle, former judge, U.S. District Court for the District of North Dakota
- Charles Vogel, former judge, U.S. Court of Appeals for the Eighth Circuit
- Robert W. Warren, former judge, U.S. District Court for the Eastern District of Wisconsin

==== State judges ====
- Douglas K. Amdahl, former chief justice of the Minnesota Supreme Court
- G. Barry Anderson, former justice, Minnesota Supreme Court
- Paul H. Anderson, justice, Minnesota Supreme Court
- Russell A. Anderson, former chief justice of the Minnesota Supreme Court
- Kathleen A. Blatz, former chief justice of the Minnesota Supreme Court
- Harrison A. Bronson, former justice, North Dakota Supreme Court
- Edward T. Burke, former justice, North Dakota Supreme Court
- Theodore Christianson, former justice, Minnesota Supreme Court
- Margaret Chutich, justice, Minnesota Supreme Court
- Mary Jeanne Coyne, former justice, Minnesota Supreme Court
- John P. Devaney, former chief justice of the Minnesota Supreme Court
- Ralph J. Erickstad, former chief justice of the North Dakota Supreme Court
- Paul Feinman, judge, New York Court of Appeals
- Thomas F. Gallagher, former justice, Minnesota Supreme Court
- Sandra Gardebring Ogren, former justice, Minnesota Supreme Court
- Thomas Eugene Grady, former justice, Washington Supreme Court
- Janine Kern, justice, South Dakota Supreme Court
- Oscar Knutson, former chief justice of the Minnesota Supreme Court
- Ernest W. Lewis, former justice, Arizona Supreme Court
- Charles Loring, former chief justice of the Minnesota Supreme Court
- Eric J. Magnuson, chief justice of the Minnesota Supreme Court
- Helen M. Meyer, justice of the Minnesota Supreme Court
- Julius J. Olson, former justice, Minnesota Supreme Court
- Alan Page, justice of the Minnesota Supreme Court and member of NFL Hall of Fame
- Harry H. Peterson, former justice, Minnesota Supreme Court
- Peter S. Popovich, former chief justice of the Minnesota Supreme Court
- Keith Rapp, judge, Oklahoma Court of Civil Appeals
- Robert Sheran, former chief justice of the Minnesota Supreme Court
- John E. Simonett, former justice, Minnesota Supreme Court
- Leslie Stein, judge, New York Court of Appeals
- Edward C. Stringer, former justice, Minnesota Supreme Court
- Samuel B. Wilson, former justice, Minnesota Supreme Court
- Michael A. Wolff, former chief justice of the Missouri Supreme Court
- Lawrence R. Yetka, former justice, Minnesota Supreme Court

==== Attorneys general ====
- Keith Ellison, current Minnesota attorney general
- William S. Ervin, former Minnesota attorney general
- Mike Hatch, former Minnesota attorney general
- Douglas M. Head, former Minnesota attorney general
- Hubert H. Humphrey III, former Minnesota attorney general
- Henry Linde, former North Dakota attorney general
- Robert W. Mattson, Sr., former Minnesota attorney general
- William D. Mitchell, former U.S. attorney general
- Byron S. Payne, former South Dakota attorney general
- Harry H. Peterson, former Minnesota attorney general
- Albert F. Pratt, former Minnesota attorney general
- Warren Spannaus, former Minnesota attorney general
- Leo A. Temmey, former attorney general of South Dakota

==== Foreign ====
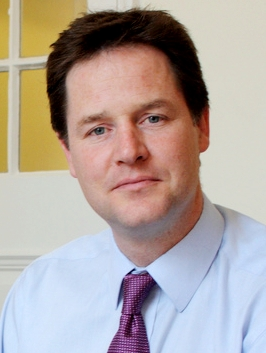
Nick Clegg

- Mohamed Azmin Ali, Malaysian politician; minister of Economic Affairs of Malaysia
- Arne Arnesen, Norwegian politician and official
- Mohamed Benaissa, former foreign minister of Morocco
- Luis Carranza, former minister of Economy and Finance, Peru
- Michael Clark, former member of the British Parliament
- Nick Clegg, British MP; former deputy prime minister of the United Kingdom; former leader of the Liberal Democrats
- Prabhat Nalini Das, public intellectual, professor and pro-vice chancellor, India
- Lamberto Dini, ex-prime minister of Italy
- Timothy Donaldson, Bahamian banker and ambassador
- Habib Essid, prime minister of Tunisia
- Jon Gerrard, former member, Parliament of Canada
- Geir Haarde, former prime minister of Iceland
- Werikhe Kafabusa, minister for Housing, Uganda
- Vijay Kelkar, Indian economist and public official
- Ko Wen-je, physician and former mayor of Taipei City
- Abdessalem Mansour, former Tunisian agriculture minister
- Hubert Minnis, prime minister of the Bahamas
- Khurram Murad, Pakistani politician and Islamic activist
- Fred H. Nomme, Norwegian diplomat
- Archie Norman, former member of the British Parliament
- Perng Fai-nan, economist, governor of the Central Bank of the Republic of China (Taiwan) since 1998
- Ricardo Raineri, minister of Energy, Chile
- Sohn Suk-hee, South Korean anchor and president of broadcast system
- Paulo Zucula, Mozambican politician

==== Others in law and politics ====
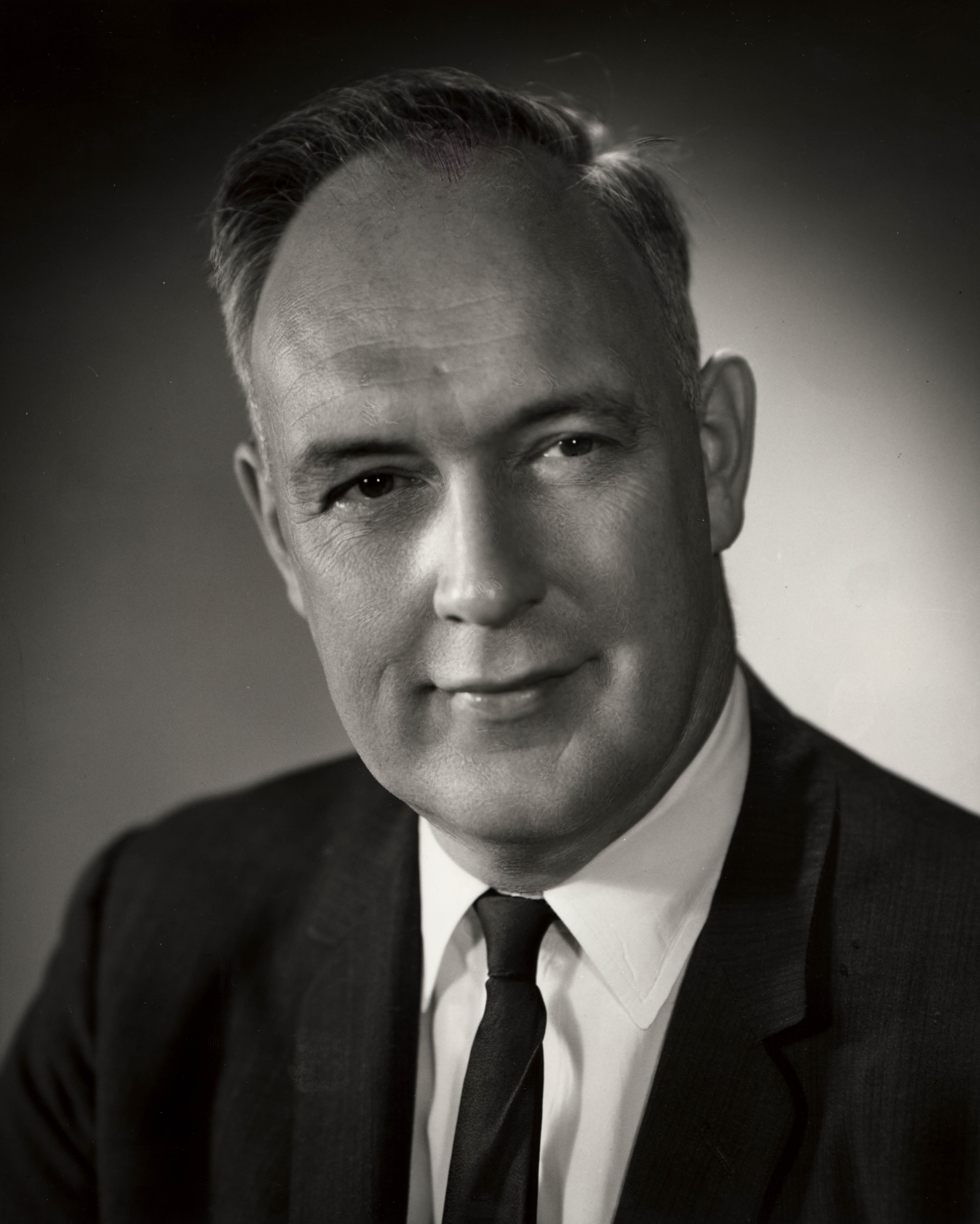
William H. Stewart

- Fred Agnich, Republican member of the Texas House of Representatives from Dallas County, 1971–1987; petroleum producer, rancher, native of St. Louis County, Minnesota
- George Edward Akerson, former White House Press Secretary
- Nihad Awad, executive director, Council on American-Islamic Relations
- John J. Ballentine, New Hampshire legislator
- Janet Benshoof, attorney
- John T. Benson, superintendent of Public Instruction of Wisconsin
- William Berndt, Wisconsin legislator
- Everett Bidwell, Wisconsin legislator
- Val Bjornson, Minnesota state treasurer
- D. E. Bowe, Wisconsin legislator
- David R. Brink, former president, American Bar Association
- Alden W. Clausen, former president, World Bank
- Lawrence D. Cohen, former mayor of Saint Paul, Minnesota
- Chris Coleman, mayor of Saint Paul, Minnesota
- John A. Conant, Wisconsin legislator
- Gratia Countryman, librarian
- Paul Dailey Jr., Wisconsin legislator
- Jimmy Delshad, former mayor, Beverly Hills, California
- Michael Dombeck, former chief, United States Forest Service
- Peggy Flanangan, 50th lieutenant governor of Minnesota and former legislator
- Gary R. Goyke, Wisconsin legislator
- James Harsdorf, Wisconsin legislator
- Howard E. Haugerud, diplomat
- Winifred G. Helmes, assistant director, United States Department of Labor Women's Bureau
- Edward L. Howard, Pennsylvania state senator
- John W. Hopp, Minnesota state senator
- John Hutson, former Judge Advocate General, United States Navy
- Sly James, J.D., 1983, Kansas City mayor
- Stephanie Johanns, former Nebraska legislator and First Lady
- Andrew Johnson, Minneapolis City Councilmember
- Byron F. Johnson, United States Marine Corps major general
- Ellen J. Kennedy, activist
- Roger G. Kennedy, former director, National Park Service
- John Kringen, deputy director, CIA
- Robert J. Larson, Wisconsin legislator
- Thomas E. Latimer, former mayor of Minneapolis, Minnesota
- George E. Leach, former mayor of Minneapolis
- Algernon Lee, Socialist Party of America leader
- William P. Levine, 1937, United States Army major general and Holocaust speaker
- Jim Lord, Minnesota state treasurer, Minnesota State Senate
- Paul J. F. Lusaka, former president, United Nations General Assembly
- Edwin L. MacLean, Minnesota legislator
- William H. Markham, Wisconsin legislator
- Paul J. Marwin, former Minnesota state politician
- Mary O. McCarthy, former CIA analyst who allegedly leaked classified information
- Doug McFarland, Minnesota state politician
- Stephen Meredith, Kentucky state senator
- Richard Moe, former chief of staff to the vice president of the United States
- Arthur Naftalin, former mayor of Minneapolis
- John E. Otto, former director, FBI
- John Parkin, Wisconsin legislator
- Aagot Raaen, author and educator
- Gordon Rosenmeier, former Minnesota state senator
- A. J. Rosier, Wyoming state senator
- Edward Rustad, former Minnesota state politician
- Richard M. Scammon, former director, United States Census Bureau
- Randy Scheunemann, influential neoconservative
- Wilfred I. Smith, archivist
- Gene Sperling, director, National Economic Council
- Elmer B. Staats, former comptroller general of the United States
- William H. Stewart, former United States Surgeon General
- Carl Stokes, former mayor, Cleveland, Ohio
- Steve Strachan, former member of the Minnesota House of Representatives, former sheriff of King County, Washington
- Clarence Syvertson, former director, Ames Research Center
- Sumner L. Trussell, judge of the United States Board of Tax Appeals
- Kenneth S. White, Wisconsin legislator
- Roy Wilkins, former civil rights activist
- Don I. Wortman, former acting commissioner of the Social Security Administration
- Whitney Young, former civil rights activist

=== Military ===
- Bree Fram, colonel in the United States Space Force, highest ranking transgender officer in the United States Armed Forces
- Matthew J. Strub, major general in the United States Army, adjutant general of the Wisconsin National Guard

=== Leadership and business ===
- Anthony Adducci, founder of Guidant
- Stéphane Bancel, CEO of Moderna
- John S. Barry, former CEO, WD-40 Company
- James H. Binger, former CEO, Honeywell
- Tom Burnett, vice president, Thoratec Corporation
- Austen S. Cargill II, heir and major shareholder of Cargill
- Margaret Anne Cargill, philanthropist
- Curt Carlson, founder of the Carlson Companies
- Alden W. Clausen, former CEO, Bank of America
- Elmer William Engstrom, former president and CEO of RCA
- Robert W. Fleming, former Mayo Clinic executive and director of USA Hockey
- Carl L. Hamilton, named partner in the Booz Allen Hamilton management and information technology consulting firm
- John Hammergren, CEO, McKesson Corporation
- Rodney R. Hannula, U.S. National Guard general
- Terrance Hanold, former president of the Pillsbury Company
- Harry Heltzer, former CEO, 3M Corporation
- Robert E. Hillard, public relations executive
- Duane Ilstrup, statistician
- Irwin L. Jacobs, entrepreneur
- Mildred Jeffrey, former president of United Auto Workers, winner of the Presidential Medal of Freedom
- James A. Johnson, former CEO of Fannie Mae
- Joseph M. Juran, management consultant
- Frederick Kappel, former chairman of AT&T
- Stephen F. Keating, former president, Honeywell
- Erwin Kelm, former president, Cargill
- Jill Konrath, sales strategist and author of Selling to Big Companies and SNAP Selling
- Sheila Krumholz, former executive director of OpenSecrets
- John Hugh MacMillan, businessman
- Ted Mann, head of Mann Theatres
- Charles "Chuck" Marohn, founder and president of Strong Towns
- Leonard Murray, former president, Soo Line Railroad
- Christopher O'Malley, president and CEO of Compuware
- James O'Shaughnessy, asset manager
- John S. Pillsbury, Jr., former president, Northwestern National Life Insurance Company
- Chuck Porter
- Prakash Puram, former CEO of iXmatch
- William John Quinn, former president, Milwaukee Road
- Osman Rashid, entrepreneur
- Lee Raymond, former CEO of Exxon Mobil Corporation
- William J. Ruane, investor
- T. Denny Sanford, CEO of United National Corporation
- Irving S. Shapiro, former CEO of DuPont
- Asha Sharma, Executive Vice President and CEO of XBOX
- Ballard Smith, former president, San Diego Padres
- Michael Sokolski, engineer, founder and inventor of Scantron
- Arne Sorenson, CEO, Marriott International
- William Spell, founder and president of Spell Capital Partners
- Thomas O. Staggs, chairman, Walt Disney Co.
- Melvin Steen, corporate attorney
- Ronald Stordahl, CEO, Digi-Key
- John Stumpf, CEO, Wells Fargo Bank
- Michael P. Sullivan, former president, Dairy Queen
- Eric Swanson, general counsel of BATS Trading
- Erwin Tomash, co-founder, Dataproducts
- Robert Ulrich, former CEO, Target
- Roy Wilkins, former executive director of the NAACP
- Halsey William Wilson, founder in 1989 of the H. W. Wilson Company; named one of "100 Most Important Leaders We Had in the 20th Century" by American Libraries
- David W. Winn, U.S. Air Force general
- Michael W. Wright, former CEO of SuperValu
- Whitney Young, former executive director, National Urban League

=== Science and medicine ===
- J. Edward Anderson, engineer
- Moe Anderson, dental surgeon
- Rutherford Aris, professor of chemical engineering (1958–2005); professor of classics specializing in paleography
- Dave Arneson, game designer
- Marian Breland Bailey, psychologist
- Earl Bakken, founder, Medtronic
- Amit Bando, climate activist
- Christopher Barden, psychologist
- Christiaan Barnard, surgeon
- Trevor J. Barnes, geographer
- John Barry, engineer
- Amitrajeet A. Batabyal, economist
- C. Fred Bentley, soil scientist
- Lloyd Berkner, physicist and engineer
- Sanford I. Berman, philanthropist
- Philip E. Bernatz, physician
- Sara C. Bisel, anthropologist
- William F. Bottke, planetary scientist
- Marci Bowers, physician
- Walter Houser Brattain, physicist
- Jeannette Brown, chemist and historian
- William Fuller Brown, Jr., physicist
- Helen Foot Buell, ecologist
- Murray Fife Buell, ecologist
- Arthur H. Bulbulian, engineer
- Harold Bunger, chemist
- Hugh Butt, physician
- David P. Campbell, psychologist
- Mihaela Cardei, computer scientist and professor
- Duane G. Carey, astronaut
- Cherie Carter-Scott, author
- Horace G. Cates, medical doctor and coroner
- T. T. Chang, agricultural scientist
- Ed Chi, computer scientist
- Imrich Chlamtac, computer scientist
- Helen Codere, anthropologist
- Gratia Countryman, librarian
- John Hubert Craigie, plant pathologist
- Seymour Cray, founder, Cray Research
- Arthur Cronquist, botanist
- Leah Culver, computer scientist
- David Dahlin, physician
- Donald A. Dahlstrom, engineer
- Jack Dangermond, environmental scientist
- Farrington Daniels, chemist
- Jeff Dean, early member at Google, now leading Google DeepMind
- Eduardo Santiago Delpin, physician
- Robert J. Desnick, physician and geneticist
- Satish Dhawan, mathematician and engineer
- Theodore S. Drachman, author
- Richard Gurley Drew, inventor
- M. Bridget Duffy, physician
- Halbert L. Dunn, physician
- Marvin Dunnette, psychologist
- John S. Eastwood, engineer
- Frank Edwin Egler, plant ecologist
- William D. Emmons, chemist
- Elmer William Engstrom, television engineer
- Mordecai Ezekiel, economist
- Richard Farson, psychologist
- Robert Folinsbee, geologist
- John E. Franz, chemist
- John G. Frayne, physician
- Alfred Freedman, psychiatrist
- Scott Freeman, economist
- Arthur Fry, inventor
- Robert R. Gilruth, former director, Johnson Space Center
- Donald Gleason, pathologist
- Robert A. Good, physician
- John Paul Goode, geographer
- Robert W. Gore, engineer
- Mark Gorenberg, engineer
- Ulysses Sherman Grant, geologist
- John S. Gulliver, environmental engineer and academic
- Ronald D. Guttmann, physician
- William S. Harris, scientist and academic
- Walter Henry Hartung, pharmaceutical chemist
- Torey Hayden, psychologist
- Philip Hedrick, biologist
- Isaac Held, scientist
- Jessica Hellmann, ecologist
- Robert A. Henle, engineer
- Marie Inez Hilger, Benedictine nun and anthropologist
- John Kenneth Hilliard, electrical engineer
- Jane Elizabeth Hodgson, physician
- Abram Hoffer, psychiatrist
- John H. Hoffman, scientist
- John L. Holland, psychologist
- Robert Hollenhorst, physician
- Cyril Hoyt, psychologist
- Dale Husemöller, mathematician
- Sherwood B. Idso, climate scientist
- Hope Jahren, geobotanist
- James J. Jenkins, psychologist
- Reynold B. Johnson, inventor
- Selmer M. Johnson, mathematician
- Rene Joyeuse (1920–2012), physician, surgeon, researcher; co-founder of American Trauma Society
- B. J. Kennedy, physician
- Mohammad Aslam Khan Khalil, physicist
- Lemont Kier, chemist
- Lawrence Kirk, agronomist
- George R. Klare, psychologist
- Tom Krimigis, space scientist, physicist
- Paul Eston Lacy, physician
- Scott Lilienfeld, author, psychologist
- C. Walton Lillehei, surgeon
- Kjell N. Lindgren, astronaut
- Joseph Lykken, physicist
- David Madson, political scientist
- Mark P. McCahill, computer scientist
- Paul E. Meehl, psychologist
- Bruce A. Menge, ocean ecologist
- Sanjay Mittal, engineer
- Calvin Mooers, computer scientist
- George E. Moore, physician
- Ellen Torelle Nagler (1870–1965), biologist, author, lecturer
- Russell M. Nelson, surgeon and 17th president of the Church of Jesus Christ of Latter-day Saints
- Edward Ng, mathematician
- Walter R. Nickel, dermatologist
- Joseph D. Novak
- Richard Oriani, metallurgist, first director of Corrosion Research Center
- Michelle Oyen, materials scientist
- Walter Palmer, dental surgeon, known for killing a protected lion in Zimbabwe's Hwange National Park
- James Papez, physician
- Rudolph Pariser, chemist
- George Parshall, chemist
- David Passig, futurist
- Joseph R. Pawlik, marine biologist
- Richard A. Peterson, architect, fighter ace
- George Philippidis, energy advisor
- Jeannette Piccard
- Ananda Prasad, biochemist
- George H. Prudden, engineer
- Marian Radke-Yarrow, psychologist
- Joseph Edward Rall, endocrinologist
- Malcolm Renfrew, chemist
- Theodore H. Rowell
- Harry Rowsell, veterinarian
- Avtar Saini, engineer
- Cecil Salmon, agronomist
- Richard L. Sandor, economist
- Sylvester Sanfilippo, pediatrician who described Sanfilippo syndrome
- Roscoe Frank Sanford, astronomer
- Otto Schmitt, inventor, engineer, and biophysicist
- Norman Shumway, surgeon
- Kevin Sivula, profressor of molecular engineering at EPFL
- Bent Skovmand, plant scientist
- Amy Skubitz, immunologist, cancer researcher
- Deke Slayton, Mercury Seven astronaut
- Bill Smith, Motorola engineer
- Elvin C. Stakman, plant pathologist
- John Stapp, physician
- William Bushnell Stout, engineer
- Clarence Syvertson, engineer
- Leona E. Tyler, psychologist
- Kambiz Vafai, mechanical engineer
- Jo Anne Van Tilburg, archeologist
- David Walsh, psychologist
- Richard A. Weinberg, psychologist
- Louis Jolyon West, psychiatrist
- Robert J. White, surgeon
- Louis B. Wilson, pathologist
- John A. Wise, nutritionist
- Jill Zimmerman, computer scientist and professor

=== Academics and education ===
==== A–C ====
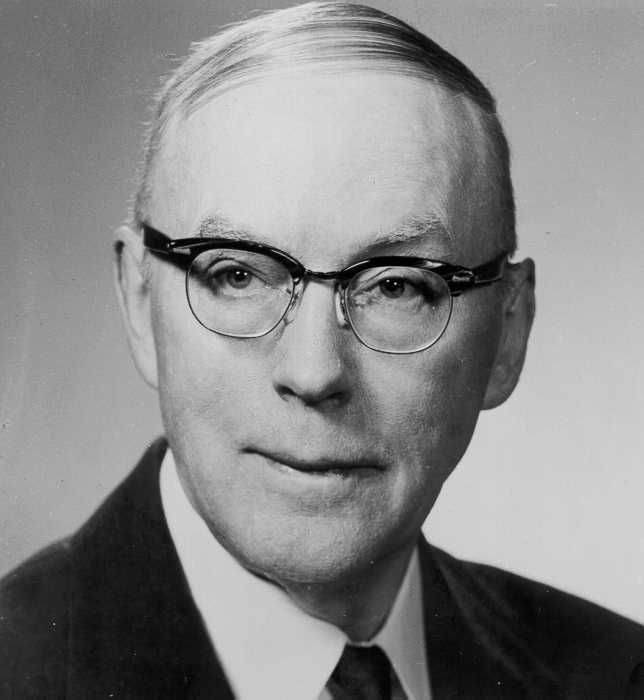
George A. Lundberg

- James Luther Adams, former professor, Harvard University
- Ramesh K. Agarwal, professor, Washington University in St. Louis
- Sydney E. Ahlstrom, former professor, Yale University
- John S. Allen, president, University of Florida, founding president, University of South Florida
- Fernando Alvarez, economist; professor, University of Chicago
- Glenn J. Ames, professor, University of Toledo
- Kinsey Anderson, former professor, University of California, Berkeley
- Lawrence B. Anderson, former professor, MIT
- Richard Davis Anderson, former professor, University of Pennsylvania
- William Anderson, former professor, University of Minnesota
- James C. Anthony, professor, Michigan State University
- Masahiko Aoki, professor, Stanford University
- Arvind, computer scientist; professor at MIT
- Richard N. Aslin, professor, University of Rochester
- John D. Axtell, former professor, Purdue University
- Myrtle Aydelotte, former dean, University of Iowa
- Norman H. Baker, former professor, Columbia University
- Clarence Barber, former professor, University of Manitoba
- William A. Bardeen, former associate professor, Stanford University
- Michael N. Barnett, professor, George Washington UniversityR4f
- Eric Becklin, professor emeritus, UCLA
- David T. Beito, professor, The University of Alabama
- Mary Lathrop Benton (1864–1955), professor, Smith College; professor and dean of women, Carleton College
- Robert M. Berdahl, former chancellor, University of California, Berkeley
- Dale Berger, dean, Claremont Graduate University
- Jessie Bernard, former professor, Penn State University
- Gary Berntson, professor, Ohio State University
- Ellen S. Berscheid, professor, University of Minnesota
- Robert A. Bjork, professor, UCLA
- Rebecca Blank, chancellor, University of Wisconsin–Madison; former dean, University of Michigan
- Walker Bleakney, former professor, Princeton University
- Carl Blegen, former professor, University of Cincinnati
- John Elof Boodin, philosopher
- Luc Bovens, professor, University of London (London School of Economics)
- Willard L. Boyd, former president, University of Iowa
- Susan Brantly, professor, University of Wisconsin–Madison
- Stanley Brodsky, professor, Stanford University
- Robert A. Brown, president, Boston University; former provost, MIT
- Keith Brueckner, former professor, University of California, San Diego
- Nathaniel A. Buchwald, former professor, UCLA
- Murray Fife Buell, professor, Rutgers University
- Martin Bunzl, professor, Rutgers University
- Jon Butler, professor, Yale University
- Arthur Butz, associate professor, Northwestern University
- Henry Byerly, philosopher and former professor, University of Arizona
- Karlyn Kohrs Campbell, professor, University of Minnesota
- John Bissell Carroll, former professor, Harvard University
- Stephen Carls, professor, Union University
- Anne Carlsen, disability rights advocate and educator, international speaker, 1958 recipient of President's Handicapped American of the Year Trophy, 1985 inductee into the National Hall of Fame for Persons with Disabilities
- Terry Castle, professor, Stanford University
- Diana Ming Chan, social worker
- Mary Ellen Chase, former professor, Smith College
- Lawrence J. Christiano, professor, Northwestern University
- Lee Anna Clark, professor, University of Iowa
- Sterling Clarren, professor, University of Washington
- Helen Codere, anthropologist
- Ronald L. Cohen, professor, Bennington College
- Brock Cole, former professor, University of Wisconsin–Madison
- Hugh M. Cole, historian and former professor, Army War College
- William E. Coles, Jr., professor, University of Pittsburgh
- Elizabeth Colson, professor emerita, University of California, Berkeley
- Ada Comstock, former president, Radcliffe College
- William W. Cooley, former professor, University of Pittsburgh
- Thomas Courtice, former president, Ohio Wesleyan University
- Richard Cyert, former president, Carnegie Mellon University

==== D–G ====
- Arthur C. Dahlberg, professor, Cornell University
- Norris Darrell, former president, American Law Institute
- Colleen Denney, professor, University of Wyoming
- John A. DeNovo, former professor, University of Wisconsin–Madison
- Frank J. Dixon, founder and former director, Scripps Research Institute
- Joel Dobris, professor, University of California, Davis
- Simon L. Dolan, professor, Advantere School of Management
- Monroe D. Donsker, former professor, New York University
- Rhoda Dorsey, longest-serving and first female president of Goucher College
- William Gould Dow, former professor, University of Michigan
- Fred Dretske, former professor, Stanford University and University of Wisconsin–Madison
- Martin Eichenbaum, professor, Northwestern University
- Frieda Ekotto, professor, University of Michigan
- Charles C. Eldredge, professor, University of Kansas
- Rodney Erickson, president, Penn State University
- W.G. Ernst, former professor, Stanford University
- William Kaye Estes, former professor, Harvard University
- Alvin C. Eurich, former president, State University of New York
- Lin Fanghua, professor, Courant Institute of Mathematical Sciences
- Bruce A. Finlayson, professor emeritus, University of Washington
- Otto Folin, former professor, Harvard University
- Edward Monroe Freeman, former dean, University of Minnesota
- Scott Freeman, economist
- Phyllis Freier, former physicist
- Frederick Charles Frey, former dean, Louisiana State University
- Agnes Moore Fryberger, music educator, University of Louisville
- Reynold C. Fuson, former professor, University of Illinois at Urbana–Champaign
- Nathaniel Gage, former professor, Stanford University
- Fred Galvin, professor, University of Kansas
- Sheldon Garon, professor, Princeton University
- Scott Gates, professor, Norwegian University of Science and Technology
- Ernest Gellhorn, former dean of Law, Arizona State University, Case Western Reserve University, and University of Washington
- Mary Gergen, former professor, Penn State University
- Frank Gillis, ethnomusicologist, former director of the Archives of Traditional Music, Indiana University
- Jon Gjerde, former professor, University of California, Berkeley
- Knut Gjerset, former professor, Luther College
- Jane Glazebrook, professor, MIT
- Michael J. Glennon, professor, Tufts University
- Gerald Jay Goldberg, professor emeritus, UCLA
- Robert A. Good, former professor, University of Minnesota
- Irving Gottesman, former professor, University of Minnesota and University of Virginia
- Ulysses Sherman Grant, former professor, Northwestern University
- Roger Gray, former professor, Stanford University
- Earl Grinols, professor, Baylor University
- Charles Grisham, professor, University of Virginia
- Jennifer Guglielmo, associate professor, Smith College
- Louis Guttman, professor, Hebrew University of Jerusalem

==== H–M ====
- William W. Hagerty, former president, Drexel University
- Judith Halberstam, professor, University of Southern California
- Kermit L. Hall, former president, University at Albany, SUNY
- Patricia Hampl, professor, University of Minnesota
- Elaine Tuttle Hansen, president, Bates College
- Lars Peter Hansen, professor, University of Chicago
- Karen Hanson, provost, Indiana University
- Tim Harcourt, economist
- Robert Hariman, professor, Northwestern University
- Duchess Harris, professor, Macalester College
- William Hawkland, former chancellor, Louisiana State University
- John Earl Haynes, historian
- Eric J. Heller, professor, Harvard University
- Daniel Herschlag, professor, Stanford University
- Deborah Hertz, professor, University of California, San Diego
- James L. Hetland Jr., former professor, University of Minnesota
- Sadek Hilal, former professor, Columbia University
- Ivan Hinderaker, former chancellor, University of California, Riverside
- John L. Holland, psychologist who developed the Holland Codes
- Ralph Holman, professor emeritus, University of Minnesota
- Joseph M. Horn, professor, University of Texas-Austin
- Frederick L. Hovde, former president, Purdue University
- Mary Howell, former associate dean of medicine, Harvard University
- Lloyd Hustvedt, former professor, Saint Olaf College
- Yuji Ijiri, professor, Carnegie Mellon University
- Daniel Janzen, professor, University of Pennsylvania
- Robert Jensen, professor, University of Texas-Austin
- Leon H. Johnson, professor and president, Montana State University (1964–1969)
- Carol Johnson-Dean, interim president of LeMoyne–Owen College (2019–2021)
- D. Bruce Johnstone, former chancellor, State University of New York
- Richard W. Jones, professor, Northwestern University
- Eric W. Kaler, president, University of Minnesota
- Gordon Kane, professor, University of Michigan
- Shirley Strum Kenny, former president, Queens College
- Jeanne Halgren Kilde, professor, University of Minnesota
- Robert Kingsley, former dean of Law, University of Southern California
- James Kritzeck, professor, Princeton University
- Patricia K. Kuhl, professor, University of Washington
- Amitava Kumar, professor, Vassar College
- Jane Larson, former professor, University of Wisconsin–Madison
- Bibb Latane, psychologist
- Joyce Lebra, former professor, University of Colorado
- Maurice LeClair, former vice dean, Université de Montréal
- Keith Lehrer, philosopher
- Ernest Lepore, philosopher
- Aaron B. Lerner, former professor, Yale University
- Melva Lind, French scholar
- Raymond Lindeman, former ecologist
- Lars Ljungqvist, professor, NYU, Stockholm School of Economics, IZA
- Lyle Norman Long, professor, Penn State University
- David Lubinski, professor, Vanderbilt University
- George A. Lundberg, former professor, University of Washington
- Thomas S. Lundgren, professor emeritus, University of Minnesota
- Michael Lynch, geneticist; professor, Arizona State University
- Myles Mace, former distinguished professor, Harvard Business School
- Conway MacMillan, professor of botany at University of Minnesota
- Mark Mahowald, professor, Northwestern University
- Helmut Maier, professor, University of Ulm
- Albert Marcet, professor, University of London (London School of Economics)
- Dan Markingson, former psychiatric study participant
- Harry S. Martin, former librarian and professor, Harvard University
- Andreu Mas-Colell, former professor, Harvard University
- Richard Maxwell, former dean of Law, UCLA
- E. Jerome McCarthy, former professor, Michigan State University
- William Parker McKee, second president of Shimer College
- Ernest O. Melby, former dean of Education, Northwestern University
- Jack Mezirow, professor emeritus, Columbia University
- Maren Michelet, first teacher of Norwegian in any public high school in the US
- Tiya Miles, associate professor, University of Michigan
- Earl Miner, former professor, Princeton University
- Sanjay Mittal, professor, Indian Institute of Technology Kanpur
- Terry M. Moe, professor, Stanford University
- Ole Moen, former professor, University of Oslo
- Parviz Moin, professor, Stanford University
- David Montgomery, professor emeritus, Yale University
- Malcolm Moos, former president, University of Minnesota
- Manfred Morari, professor, ETH Zurich
- Negar Mottahedeh, associate professor, Duke University
- C. L. Mowat, historian
- Joia Mukherjee, professor, Harvard University
- Michael Mulholland, professor, University of Michigan
- Shirley Mullen, president, Houghton College
- Farouk Abdel Wahab Mustafa, lecturer, University of Chicago
- Jack Myers, biologist; former professor, University of Texas-Austin

==== N–R ====
- Grant S. Nelson, former professor, UCLA
- Hans Neurath, professor, University of Washington
- Edward P. Ney, former professor, University of Minnesota
- Walter R. Nickel, professor, University of California, San Diego
- Alfred O. C. Nier, former professor, University of Minnesota
- Jay Noren, former president, Wayne State University
- Joseph D. Novak, former professor, Cornell University
- Josiah Ober, professor, Stanford University
- Kenneth Olwig, professor, Swedish University of Agricultural Sciences
- Henry J. Oosting, former professor, Duke University
- Myron Orfield, professor, University of Minnesota
- Robert Parr, professor, University of North Carolina, Chapel Hill
- Donn W. Parson, professor, University of Kansas
- C.H. Patterson, professor emeritus, University of Illinois, Urbana-Champaign
- Pat Pattison, professor, Berklee College of Music
- John Vernon Pavlik, professor, Rutgers University
- Vjekoslav Perica, professor emeritus, University of Rijeka; historian, author of Balkan Idols: Religion and Nationalism in Yugoslav States
- Ruby Pernell, former professor, University of Minnesota; first African American faculty member hired at a state flagship university in the 20th century
- Laurence E. Peterson, professor, University of California, San Diego
- Francis J. Pettijohn, former professor, Johns Hopkins University
- Mark Pharis, professor, University of Minnesota
- Ronald L. Phillips, professor, University of Minnesota
- Maynard Pirsig, former dean of law, University of Minnesota
- John L. Pollock, philosopher
- Daniel D. Polsby, dean of Law, George Mason University
- David Premack, professor emeritus, University of Pennsylvania
- J. A. O. Preus II, president, Concordia Theological Seminary and eighth president, Lutheran Church–Missouri Synod
- Alan R. Price, former associate professor, University of Michigan
- Luis M. Proenza, president, University of Akron
- William Prosser, former dean of law, University of California, Berkeley
- Carlton C. Qualey, former professor, Carleton College
- Doraiswami Ramkrishna, professor, Purdue University
- Alan Rector, professor, University of Manchester
- Kevin P. Reilly, president, University of Wisconsin System
- Irving J. Rein, professor, Northwestern University
- David Reinking, professor, Clemson University
- Leo George Rigler, former professor, UCLA
- Donald John Roberts, professor, Stanford University
- Harry Rozmiarek, professor, University of Pennsylvania
- Dale F. Rudd, professor, University of Wisconsin–Madison
- Millard Ruud, former executive director, Association of American Law Schools
- Allan Ryan, university attorney, Harvard University
- Robert Rynasiewicz, professor, Johns Hopkins University

==== S–Z ====
- Muhammad Sahimi, professor, University of Southern California
- Eugene G. Sander, president, University of Arizona
- John C. Sanford, associate professor emeritus, Cornell University
- Jay Scheib, professor, MIT
- Leslie Rogne Schumacher, lecturer and Belfer faculty affiliate, Harvard Kennedy School
- William R. Sears, former professor, Cornell University
- Lee Seokwoo, associate professor, Inha University; former research scholar, Oxford University
- William H. Sewell, former chancellor, University of Wisconsin–Madison
- John M. Sharp, professor, University of Texas at Austin
- Eugene P. Sheehy, head academic librarian, Columbia University
- Norman Shumway, former professor, Stanford University
- Mulford Q. Sibley, former professor, University of Minnesota
- Yum-Tong Siu, professor, Harvard University
- Steven S. Smith, professor, Washington University in St. Louis
- Edwin Spanier, former professor, University of California, Berkeley
- Melford Spiro, professor emeritus, University of California, San Diego
- Ima Winchell Stacy (1867–1923), educator
- Harold Stassen, former president, University of Pennsylvania
- Nancy Staudt, dean, Washington University in St. Louis
- Robert Stein, former dean of Law, University of Minnesota
- Alfred Steinberg, historian
- Malcolm Steinberg, former professor, Princeton University
- Keith H. Steinkraus, former professor, Cornell University
- Charles Edward Stevens, former professor, Cornell University
- Peter A. Stewart, former professor, Brown University
- William Swann, professor, University of Texas-Austin
- Leigh Tesfatsion, professor, Iowa State University
- My T. Thai, computer science engineer and professor at University of Florida
- Frank Thistlethwaite, former lecturer, Cambridge University; former Vice-Chancellor, University of East Anglia
- Paul Thompson, former professor, University of London (School of Oriental and African Studies)
- Guoqiang Tian, economist, professor, Texas A&M University
- Josephine Tilden, professor with an acrimonious relationship with the University of Minnesota
- Robert M. Townsend, professor, MIT
- Alan Trachtenberg, professor emeritus of American Studies, Yale University
- Merle Tuve, former professor, Johns Hopkins University
- Rosemond Tuve, former professor, University of Pennsylvania
- Harald Uhlig, professor, University of Chicago
- Arvind Varma, professor, Purdue University
- Paul Vojta, professor, University of California, Berkeley
- Robert G. L. Waite, former professor, Williams College
- W. Allen Wallis, former president, University of Rochester
- James Z. Wang, professor, Penn State University
- Ellen Wartella, former dean of Communications, University of Texas-Austin
- Alexander Wendt, professor, Ohio State University
- E.J. Westlake, professor and chair, Ohio State University
- Robert J. White, former professor, Case Western Reserve University
- Bruce A. Williams, professor, University of Virginia
- Dessima Williams, former professor, Brandeis University
- S. Simon Wong, professor in the Stanford Department of Electrical Engineering
- Randall Wright, professor, University of Wisconsin-Madison
- Tai Tsun Wu, professor, Harvard University
- Blong Xiong, associate professor, University of Minnesota
- Paul Alan Yule, professor, Ruprecht-Karls-Universität Heidelberg
- Nicolas Zafra, former professor, University of the Philippines
- Herman Zanstra, former professor, University of Amsterdam
- James Zumberge, former president, University of Southern California

=== Arts and entertainment ===
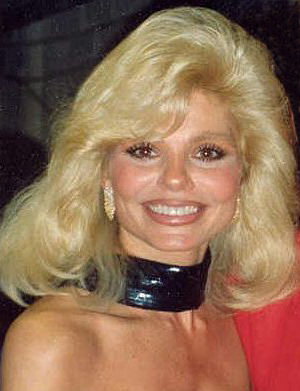
Loni Anderson

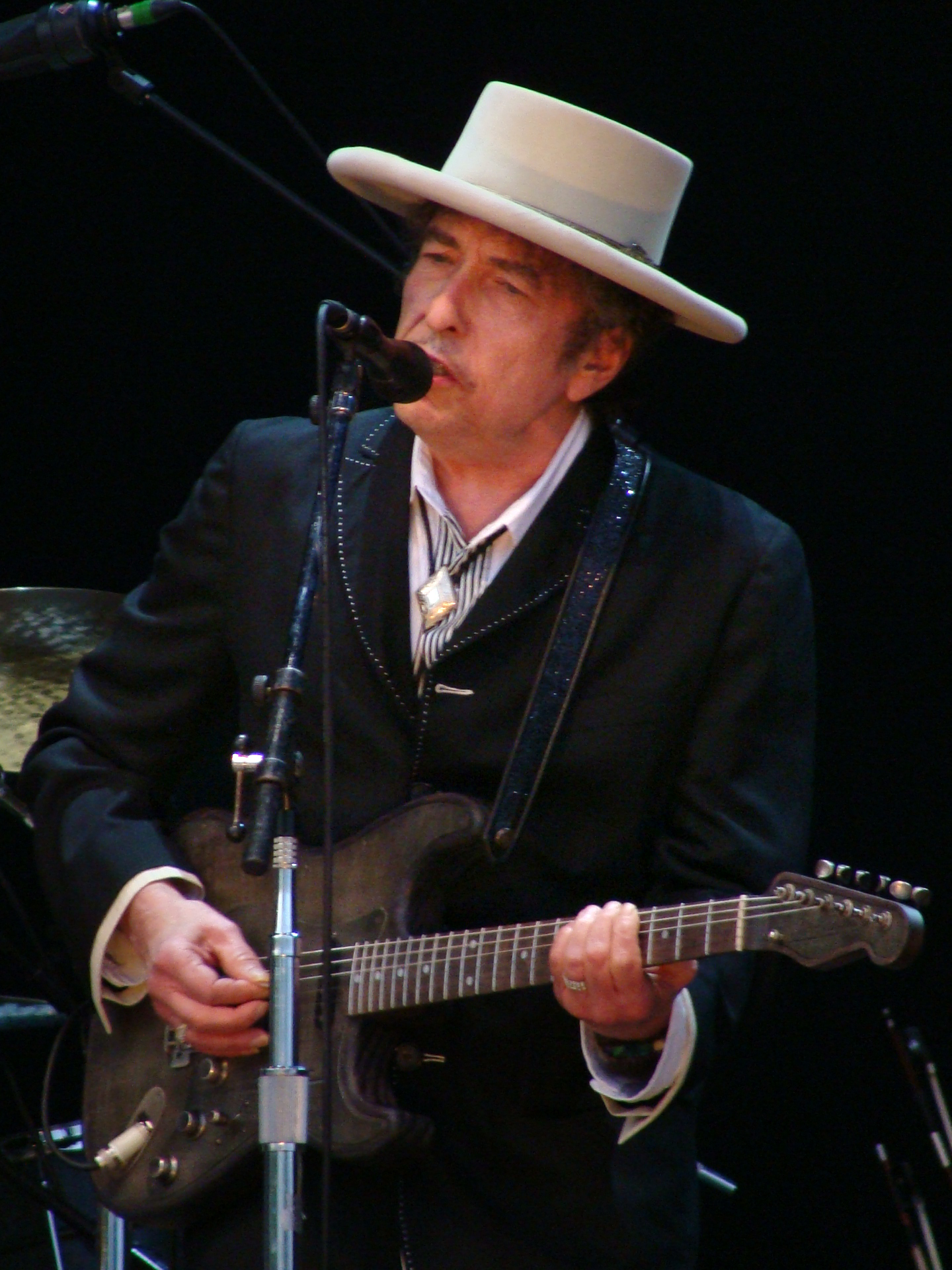
Bob Dylan

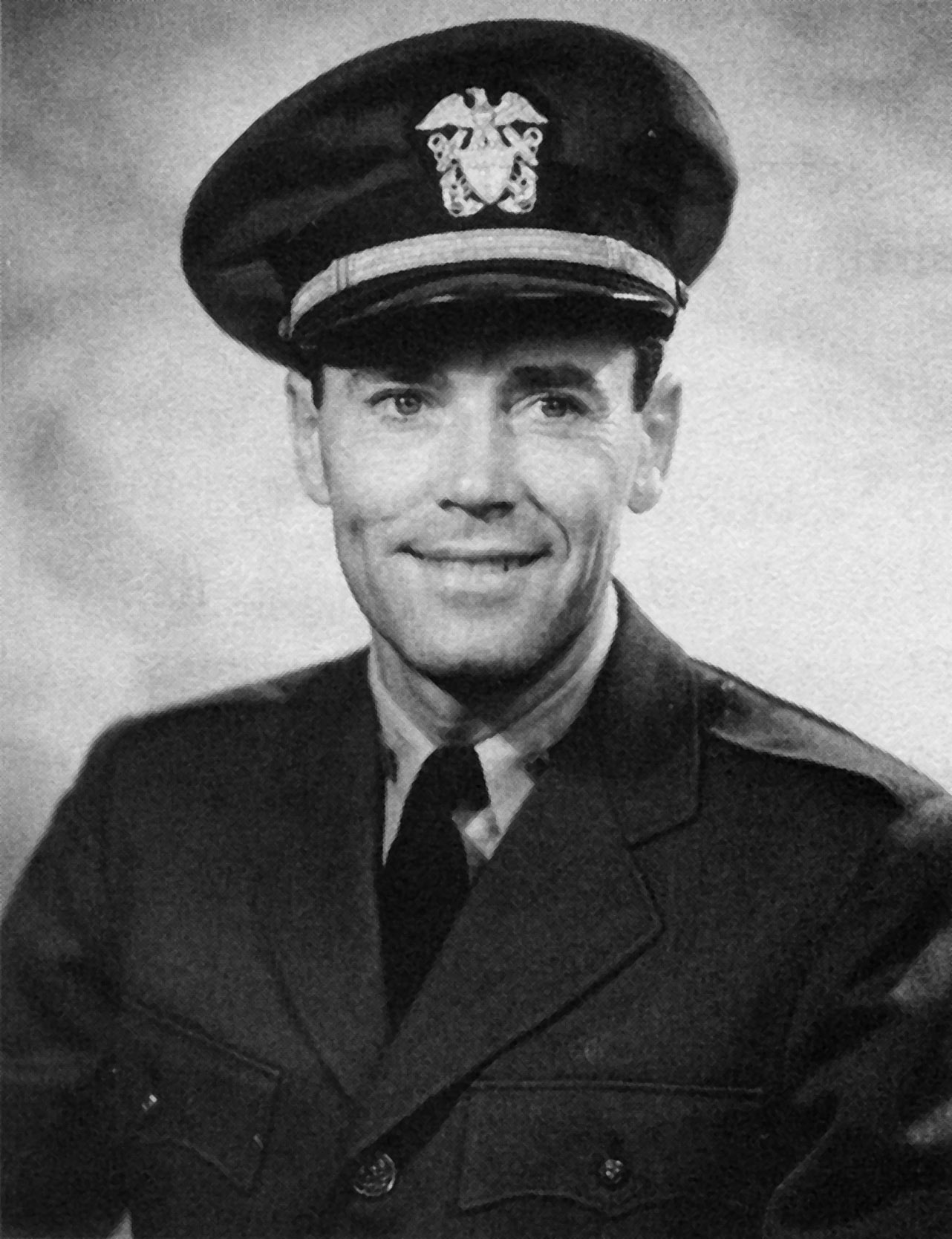
Henry Fonda

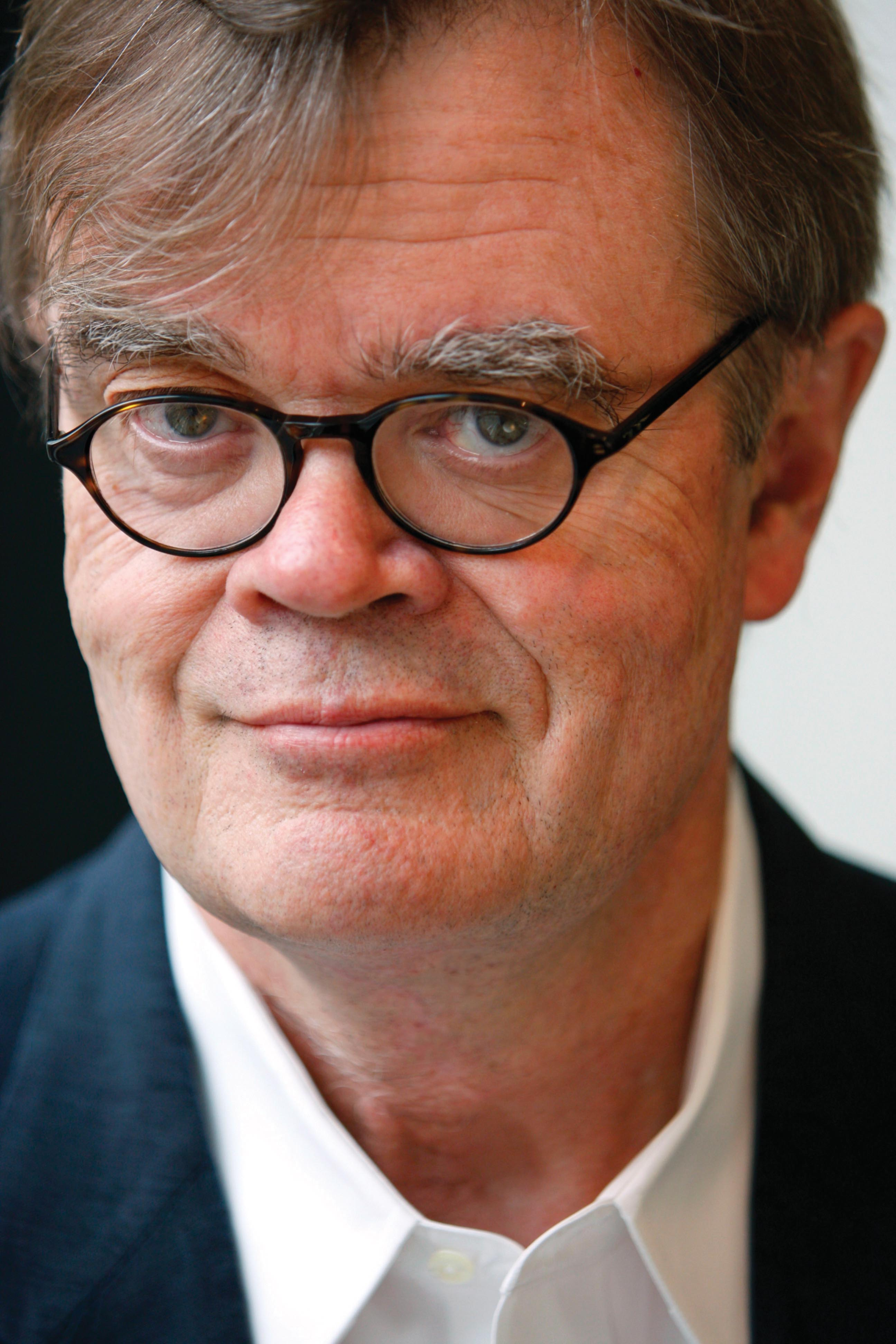
Garrison Keillor

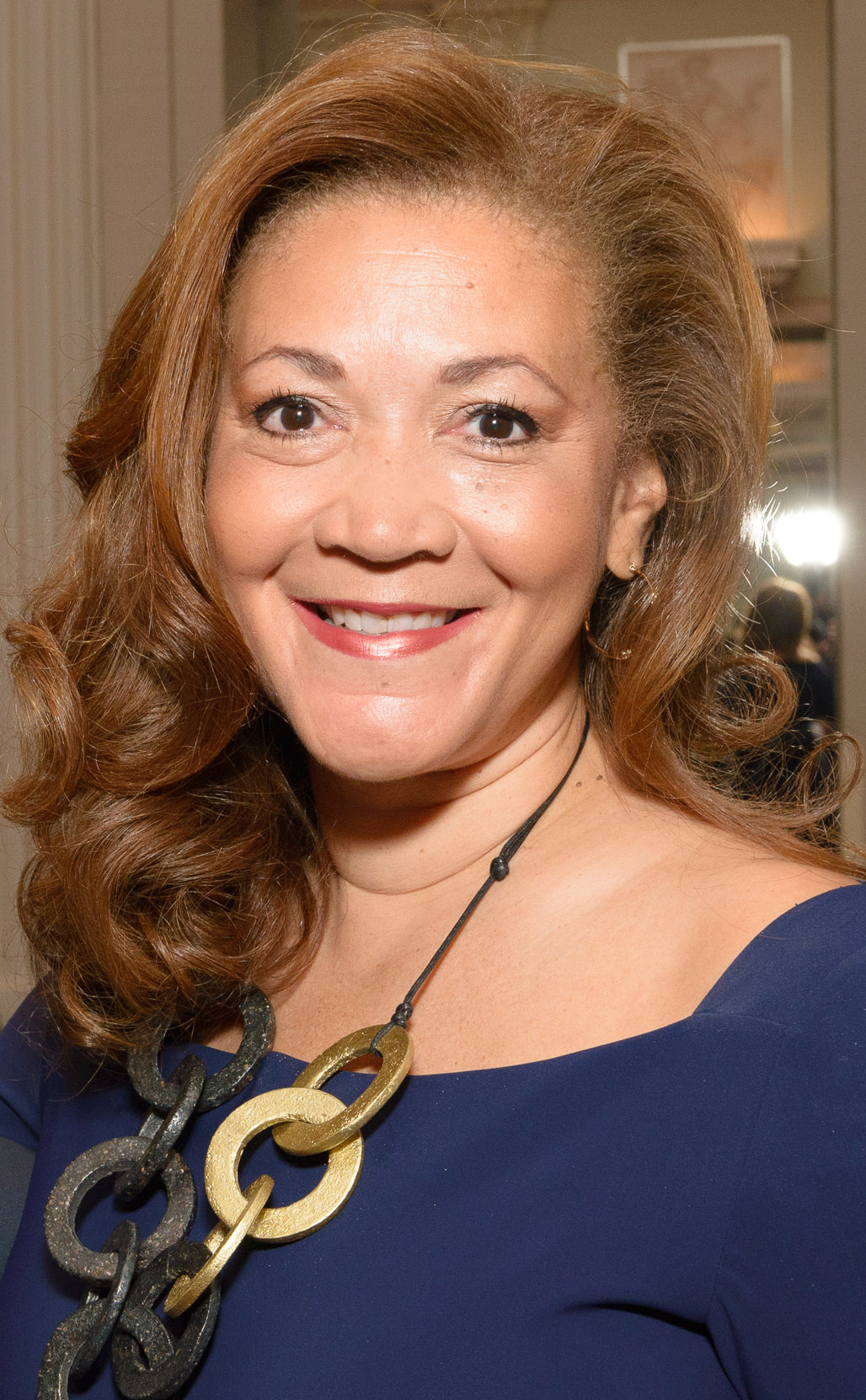
Michele Norris

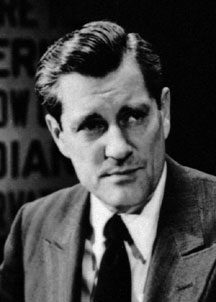
Eric Sevareid

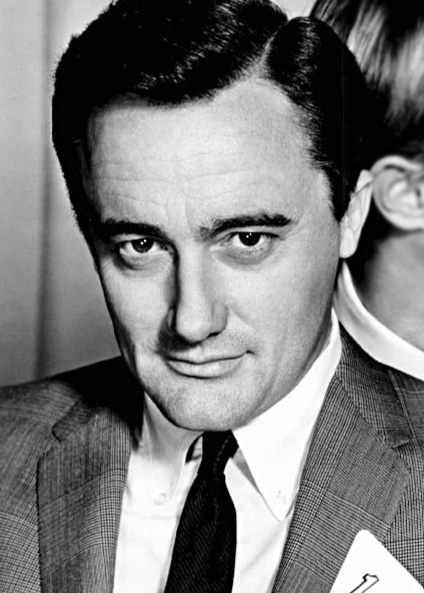
Robert Vaughn

- Kinji Akagawa, sculptor
- Eddie Albert, actor
- Charles Ronald Aldrich, architect
- Samina Ali, author
- William Albert Allard, photographer
- Loni Anderson, actress
- Poul Anderson, science fiction author
- Dave Arneson, co-creator of Dungeons & Dragons; writer; educator
- James Arness, actor
- John Astin, actor
- Maria Bamford, comedian
- Lori Barbero, musician
- Carol E Barnett, composer
- Louis and Bebe Barron, composers
- Monika Bauerlein, co-editor of Mother Jones
- Trace Beaulieu, comedian, writer for Mystery Science Theater 3000 (left after one year)
- C.C. Beck, cartoonist
- Lorna Beers, author
- T. James Belich, playwright
- Lou Bellamy, founder of Penumbra Theatre Company
- Elizabeth Berg, author
- Beatrice Gjertsen Bessesen, operatic soprano
- Abbie Betinis, composer
- Brad Beyer, actor
- Alan Bjerga, president of the National Press Club
- Susan Blackwell, actress
- Asha Blake, journalist
- Jessica Blank, actress
- Michael Blodgett, actor and screenwriter
- Carol Bly, author, short story writer
- Erin Bode, singer
- Roman Bohnen, actor
- John Bowe, author
- Guy Branum, comedian and actor
- Amy Briggs, game designer
- Bud Brisbois, musician
- Emma L. Brock, children's author and illustrator
- Connie Brockway, author
- Joel Brooks, actor
- Aaron Brown, former CNN anchor (did not graduate)
- Martin Bruestle, television producer
- Philip Brunelle, conductor, organist, entrepreneur (founder of VocalEssence)
- Scott Z. Burns, screenwriter
- Richard Carlson, actor
- William Carpenter, writer
- David Carr, journalist
- George H. Carsley (1870–1933), architect
- Aya Cash, actress
- Marsha Wilson Chall, children's author
- Daniel Chorzempa, musician
- Laura Coates, legal analyst for CNN
- Brock Cole, author
- William E. Coles, Jr., author
- Marvel Cooke, journalist
- Maryann Corbett, poet
- Arlene Dahl, actress
- George Dahl, architect
- Nicole, Erica and Jaclyn Dahm, Playboy centerfolds
- Lynn Davis, photographer
- Carl Dennis, poet
- Jim Denomie, artist
- Gordon R. Dickson, science fiction author
- Richard Dix, actor
- Ivan Dmitri, born Levon West, artist and photographer
- Tod Dockstader, composer
- Peter Docter, screenwriter and director
- Jim Donna, musician
- Hedley Donovan, editor of Time magazine
- Celius Dougherty, musician
- Lila Downs, singer
- Dick Durrell, creator of People magazine
- Julius Duscha, journalist
- J.B. Edwards, playwright
- Stephanie Edwards, TV personality
- Kimberly Elise, actress
- Herbert Elwell, composer
- Karim Emami, literary critic
- Della Gould Emmons, author
- J. Louis Engdahl, journalist
- James Enge, author
- Mark Engebretson, musician
- Robert Engels, scriptwriter
- Clara Elizabeth Fanning, editor
- John Farrell, poet
- Tovah Feldshuh, actress
- Barbara Field, playwright
- Mali Finn, casting director
- Stink Fisher, actor
- Roland Flint, poet
- Henry Fonda, actor
- Santino Fontana, actor
- Frank Forest, operatic tenor and actor
- Gladys Fornell, playwright
- Carol Hoorn Fraser, artist
- John Fraser, critic
- Howard Frazin, composer
- Stan Freese, musician
- Thomas Friedman, journalist, The New York Times
- Dave Frishberg, musician
- Warren Frost, actor
- Larry Gates, actor
- David Gebhard, architectural historian
- Tom Gjelten, NPR correspondent
- Lillian Glass, author, TV commentator, body language expert
- Jay Goede, actor
- Peter Michael Goetz, actor
- Rita K. Gollin, Nathaniel Hawthorne scholar
- Carl Graffunder, architect
- Peter Graves, actor
- Dick Guindon, cartoonist
- Gene Gutche, composer
- Harmony Hammond, artist
- Frederick Harris, conductor
- Pete Hautman, author
- Thomas Heggen, author
- Steve Heitzeg, composer
- Bruce Henricksen, author
- Maureen Herman, musician
- Ari Herstand, actor, musician
- Edwin Hawley Hewitt, architect
- Lorena Hickok, journalist
- James Hong, actor (did not graduate)
- Marya Hornbacher, author
- Marshall Houts, author
- Ernie Hudson, actor
- Jim Hughart, musician
- Irene Hunt, children's author
- Lewis Hyde, essayist
- Carl Richard Jacobi, author
- Charles Jensen, poet
- Diana Johnstone, author
- Suma Josson, filmmaker
- Nathan H. Juran, film director
- Diane Katsiaficas, visual artist
- Donald Keats, composer
- Garrison Keillor, author and satirist
- Linda Kelsey, actress
- Clyde S. Kilby, author
- Jim Klobuchar, columnist
- T. R. Knight, actor
- John Koerner, musician
- Walter Kuhlman, artist
- Mary La Chapelle, author
- Jessica Lange, actress
- Jim Lange, former game show host and disc jockey
- Libby Larsen, contemporary composer
- Jill Larson, actress
- Robert Leaf, composer
- Ed Bok Lee, author
- Nicholas Legeros, bronze sculptor
- Ralph Lemon, artist
- James Lileks, columnist
- Terrance Lindall, artist
- Knut Lindh, author
- Sidney Lippman, composer
- Maud Hart Lovelace, author
- Peg Lynch, radio and television producer
- Harvey Mackay, New York Times bestselling author
- Peter MacNicol, actor
- Kevin Manthei, film composer
- E.G. Marshall, actor
- E. L. Mayo, poet
- Robert McAlmon, author and poet
- Ryan McCartan, actor and musician
- Kevin McCarthy, actor
- David Revere McFadden, curator
- James L. McGregor, journalist
- Margaret Manton Merrill (1859–1893), journalist, writer, translator, elocutionist
- Marjorie Mikasen, painter
- May Merrill Miller, author
- John R. Milton, author
- Craig Minowa, musician
- Freddy Moore, musician
- E. Roger Muir, television producer
- Michelle Muldrow, artist
- Kate Mulgrew, actress
- John Munson, musician
- Marilyn Nelson, poet
- Charles Nolte, actor
- Michele Norris, host of NPR's All Things Considered
- Eunice Norton, pianist
- Larry Novak, musician
- Roger Nygard, filmmaker
- William N. Oatis, journalist
- Doug Ohlson, abstract artist
- Jack Ohman, cartoonist
- Helaine Olen, journalist and author
- Margo Oliver, cooking writer
- Ron Olsen, journalist
- Jenni Olson, filmmaker
- Lynn Freeman Olson, composer
- Gene O'Neill, writer
- Lisa Orr, potter and teacher of ceramics
- Arieh O'Sullivan, journalist
- Laurence Overmire, poet, actor, playwright
- Stephen Paulus, contemporary composer
- Jim Paymar, journalist
- Mary Gray Peck, journalist, suffragist, clubwoman
- Ron Perlman, actor
- Arthur Peterson, Jr., actor
- Charles E. Peterson, preservationist
- Wayne Peterson, composer
- Kristen Pfaff, bass guitarist
- Robert Pirsig, author and philosopher
- Gundaris Pone, composer
- Greta Pratt, photographer
- Michael P. Price, theatre producer and artistic director
- Gordon Purcell, artist
- Aagot Raaen, author
- Kareem Rahma, comedian
- Peggy Rathmann, author
- Harry Reasoner, ABC and CBS news anchor and correspondent
- Mona Lyn Reese, composer
- James Rosenquist, artist
- Carl Rowan, syndicated columnist, former head of United States Information Agency
- Deborah Rubin, painter
- Jerry Rusch, musician
- Kevin Rutmanis, musician
- Megan Rye, painter
- Salama Ahmed Salama, journalist
- Harrison Salisbury, journalist
- Rick Sanchez, former CNN anchor
- Larry Sanders, talk show host (fictional)
- A. J. Sass, author
- April Saul, journalist
- Kurtis Scaletta, author
- Jay Scheib, theatre director
- Michael Schelle, composer
- George Schneeman, painter
- Maria Schneider, Grammy Award-winning composer and conductor
- Robert C. Schuler, television producer
- Keith Secola, musician
- Mabel Seeley, writer
- Eric Sevareid, journalist
- Al Sheehan, entertainment businessman and radio host
- John Sheehy, architect
- Arthur Sheekman, screenwriter
- Max Shulman, author
- Hilda Simms, actress
- Kevin Skaff, musician
- Jack Smight, filmmaker
- Erin Soderberg, author
- Gale Sondergaard, Oscar-winning actress
- Wonny Song, pianist
- David Soul, actor
- Ann Stanford, poet
- Maura Stanton, poet
- Eric Stokes, composer
- Cheryl Strayed, author
- Robert Suderburg, composer
- C. Gardner Sullivan, screenwriter
- Sarah Susanka, architect
- William Swanberg, author
- Yuko Taniguchi, poet
- Maria Cristina Tavera, artist
- Stan Tekiela, photographer
- Todd Temkin, poet and cultural activist
- Bob Thaves, cartoonist
- Jack Tracy, journalist
- Ian Truitner, filmmaker
- Arthur Upson, poet
- Janika Vandervelde, composer
- Sugith Varughese, actor, screenwriter
- Robert Vaughn, actor
- John Verrall, composer
- William Wade, journalist
- Pete Wagner, cartoonist
- Sherman Walt, musician
- Donald Wandrei, science fiction/fantasy writer and editor, co-founder of Arkham House publishing
- Amy Robbins Ware, author
- Dale Warland, composer
- Joseph Waters, composer
- Lou Waters, journalist
- Will Weaver, author
- E.J. Westlake, playwright
- Donald Wexler, architect
- Minor White, photographer
- Ron Whyte, playwright
- Rick Wilber, writer
- Lona Williams, former television producer
- Jacob Winchester, writer, voice actor, and composer
- Lenny Wolpe, actor
- Joe Woyee, musician
- Patricia Wrede, author
- Yanni, Grammy-nominated pianist and composer
- Rolv Yttrehus, composer
- John Zdechlik, composer, conductor
- David Zinman, conductor
- Tay Zonday, musician and actor

=== Athletics ===
- Nine players from the university played on Herb Brooks' 1980 Miracle on Ice ice hockey team that beat the USSR and won the gold medal. The players were Bill Baker, Neal Broten, Steve Christoff, Steve Janaszak, Rob McClanahan, Mike Ramsey, Buzz Schneider, Eric Strobel and Phil Verchota.
- John Anderson, college baseball coach
- Keith Ballard, NHL defenseman
- Marion Barber III, NFL running back
- Bert Baston, College Football Hall of Fame end
- Bobby Bell, NFL linebacker
- Shelton Benjamin, WWE wrestler
- Lindsey Berg, US women's volleyball team
- Patty Berg, professional golfer and co-founder of LPGA
- Evan Bernstein (born 1960), Israeli Olympic wrestler
- Bernie Bierman, College Football Hall of Fame coach
- John Billman, football player
- Bob Bjorklund, football player
- Brian Bonin, NHL center
- Hannah Brandt, PWHL hockey player and Olympian in 2018 (gold) and 2022 (silver)
- Randy Breuer, NBA center
- Herb Brooks, head coach, 1980 U.S. Olympic hockey team
- Tom Brown, College Football Hall of Fame, guard
- J.T. Bruett, MLB outfielder
- Willie Burton, NBA guard
- Rene Capo, Olympic judoka
- Marcus Carr (born 1999), basketball player in the Israeli Basketball Premier League
- Amir Coffey (born 1997), basketball player in the Israeli Basketball Premier League; formerly in the NBA
- Chris Darkins, NFL running back
- Natalie Darwitz, US women's Olympic hockey team 2002, 2006, 2010
- AnnMaria De Mars, 1984 judo world champion, mother of Ronda Rousey
- Eric Decker, NFL wide receiver
- Brian Denman, MLB pitcher
- Tony Dungy, NFL defensive back, head coach, TV commentator
- Leonard "Buddy" Edelen, cross country runner and later marathon world record-holder and sixth-place finisher at the 1964 Olympic Marathon
- Carl Eller, NFL defensive end
- Ric Flair, professional WWE wrestler
- George Franck, College Football Hall of Fame, halfback
- Verne Gagne, Olympic and professional wrestler
- Brent Gates, MLB player
- Paul Giel, MLB pitcher
- Alex Goligoski, NHL defenseman
- Fortune Gordien, Olympic discus silver and bronze medalist
- Bud Grant, NFL head coach, NFL and NBA player
- Gabriele Grunewald, U.S. champion middle distance runner
- Ben Hamilton, NFL guard
- Jack Hannahan, MLB infielder
- Austin Hollins (born 1991), basketball player for Maccabi Tel Aviv of the Israeli Basketball Premier League
- Lou Hudson, NBA guard
- Kris Humphries, NBA forward
- Colton Iverson (born 1989), basketball player for Maccabi Tel Aviv of the Israeli Basketball Premier League
- Bobby Jackson, NBA guard
- Noel Jenke, NFL linebacker
- Walt Jocketty, MLB general manager
- Herb Joesting, College Football Hall of Fame, fullback
- Evan Kaufmann (born 1984), hockey player
- Phil Kessel, NHL winger
- George Klassen (born 2002), baseball player
- Tom Kondla, professional basketball player
- Cole Konrad, two-time undefeated, NCAA individual champion at 285 lbs; mixed martial artist and the first Bellator Heavyweight Champion in 2010
- Vic Kulbitski, football player
- Mike Lehan, NFL cornerback
- Tom Lehman, PGA golfer, British Open champion
- Nik Lentz, wrestler; mixed martial artist for the Ultimate Fighting Championship
- Jordan Leopold, NHL defenseman
- Brock Lesnar, professional WWE wrestler, mixed martial artist
- Rhys Lloyd, NFL kicker
- Pug Lund, College Football Hall of Fame, halfback
- Reggie Lynch (born 1994), basketball player for Bnei Herzliya of the Israeli Basketball Premier League
- Amos Magee (born 1971), soccer player, coach, and front office
- Laurence Maroney, NFL running back
- Bobby Marshall, first African-American NFL player, College Football Hall of Fame
- Paul Martin, NHL defenseman
- John Mayasich, Olympic hockey player
- Janel McCarville, WNBA center
- Ariel McDonald, basketball player; 2000 Israeli Basketball Premier League MVP
- Clarence McGeary, NFL defensive tackle
- John McGovern, College Football Hall of Fame quarterback
- Kevin McHale, NBA center and coach, Basketball Hall of Fame
- Karl Mecklenburg, NFL linebacker
- Yoav Meiri (born 1975), Israeli Olympic swimmer
- Mark Merrill, NFL linebacker
- Eddie Miles, NFL player
- Paul Molitor (born 1956), MLB Hall of Fame player and manager
- Anthony Montgomery, NFL defensive tackle
- Jordan Murphy (born 1997), American-U.S. Virgin Islander basketball player in the Israeli Basketball Premier League
- Bronko Nagurski, College and Pro Football Hall of Fame fullback
- Denny Neagle, MLB pitcher
- Leo Nomellini, NFL Hall of Fame linebacker
- Earl Ohlgren, NFL defensive end
- Daniel Oturu (born 1999), basketball player for Hapoel Tel Aviv of the Israeli Basketball Premier League
- Glen Perkins, MLB pitcher, Minnesota Twins
- John Pohl, NHL player
- Mitch Potter, track and field athlete
- Robb Quinlan, MLB third baseman
- Pete Regnier, NFL halfback
- Darrell Reid, NFL linebacker
- John Roethlisberger, Olympic gymnast
- Marie Roethlisberger, NCAA gymnastics champion
- Eddie Rogers, College Football Hall of Fame end
- Dusty Rychart, professional basketball player
- Charlie Sanders, Pro Football Hall of Fame, tight end
- Flip Saunders, NBA head coach
- Jeff Schuh, NFL linebacker
- Mark Setterstrom, NFL offensive guard
- Rudy Sikich, NFL tackle
- Bruce Smith, NFL halfback and Heisman Trophy winner
- Bar Soloveychik (born 2000), Israeli swimmer
- Matt Spaeth, NFL tight end
- Robb Stauber, NHL goalie
- Terry Steinbach, MLB catcher
- Sandy Stephens, All-American quarterback, College Football Hall of Fame
- Gable Steveson, wrestler, 2021 heavyweight gold medal at 2021 Tokyo Olympics, NCAA champion
- Steve Stewart, NFL linebacker
- Bob Sweiger, football player
- Thomas Tapeh, NFL fullback
- Jay Thomas, NFL tailback
- John Thomas (born 1975), NBA basketball player
- Darrell Thompson, NFL running back
- Mychal Thompson, basketball center, top pick of 1978 NBA draft
- Tuffy Thompson, NFL halfback
- Festus Tierney, NFL guard
- Clayton Tonnemaker, College Football Hall of Fame, center
- Trent Tucker, NBA guard
- Frank Twedell, NFL guard
- Rick Upchurch, NFL wide receiver, 5-time All-Pro
- Ben Utecht, NFL tight end
- Thomas Vanek, NHL left winger
- Jacob Volkmann, three-time All-American wrestler; MMA fighter
- Alma Wagen, mountain climber and guide
- Krissy Wendell, US women's Olympic hockey team 2002, 2006
- Lindsay Whalen, WNBA guard
- Blake Wheeler, NHL right winger
- Ed Widseth, College Football Hall of Fame tackle
- Dick Wildung, College Football Hall of Fame tackle
- Charles "Bud" Wilkinson, College Football Hall of Fame head coach, TV commentator
- Payton Willis (born 1998), basketball player in the Israeli Basketball Premier League
- Dave Winfield (born 1951), MLB Hall of Famer
- Kaitlin Young, professional mixed martial artist
- Amanda Zahui B., WNBA center

=== Others ===
- Jeanne Audrey Powers, leader within The United Methodist Church, an advocate for women and LGBTQ+ people in the church, and one of the first women ordained in the denomination
- Dale Snodgrass, United States Navy avaiator and air show performer, considered one of the greatest fighter pilots of all time

== Faculty ==
=== Nobel laureates ===
- Philip S. Hench, Medicine, Mayo Foundation, 1923–1965; 1950 Nobel Prize in Physiology or Medicine
- Edward C. Kendall, Biochemistry, Mayo Foundation, 1914–1951; 1950 Nobel Prize in Physiology or Medicine
- John Bardeen, Physics, 1938–1941; Nobel Prize in Physics in 1956 and 1972
- John H. van Vleck, Physics, 1923–28; 1977 Nobel Prize in Physics
- William Lipscomb, Chemistry, 1946–1959; 1976 Nobel Prize in Chemistry
- Paul D. Boyer, Biochemistry, 1945–1963; 1997 Nobel Prize in Chemistry
- Saul Bellow, English, 1946; 1976 Nobel Prize in Literature
- Milton Friedman, Economics, 1945–1946; 1976 Nobel Prize in Economic Sciences
- George J. Stigler, Economics, 1938–46; 1982 Nobel Prize in Economic Sciences
- Edward C. Prescott, Economics, 1980–2003; 2004 Nobel Prize in Economic Sciences
- Leonid Hurwicz, Economics, 1951–2008; 2007 Nobel Prize in Economic Sciences
- Christopher A. Sims, Economics, 1970–1990; 2011 Nobel Prize in Economic Sciences
- Thomas J. Sargent, Economics, 1971–1987; 2011 Nobel Prize in Economic Sciences
- Robert J. Shiller, Economics, 1972–1974; 2013 Nobel Prize in Economic Sciences

=== Pulitzer Prize winners ===
- Robert Penn Warren, Pulitzer Prize winner in 1947 for the novel All the King's Men; won Pulitzers in poetry in 1958 for Promises: Poems 1954–1956, and in 1979 for Now and Then
- John Berryman, Pulitzer Prize winner in 1965 for Poetry
- Dominick Argento, Pulitzer Prize winner in 1975 for Music

=== Professors ===
- Calvin Alexander, Morse–Alumni Professor Emeritus in the Department of Earth and Environmental Sciences at the University of Minnesota
- Karen Ashe, Alzheimer's researcher at the Department of Neurology and Neuroscience at the Medical School
- Bernard Bachrach, professor of history, medieval historian
- M. A. R. Barker, professor of Urdu and South Asian Studies, and creator of the Empire of the Petal Throne role-playing game
- Lou Bellamy, professor of theatre arts, founder of Penumbra Theatre Company
- Daphne Berdahl, anthropology professor
- John Berryman, literature professor, poet
- John R. Borchert, professor of geography
- John Joseph Bittner, professor of Cancer Research; director of the Division of Cancer Biology (1943–1961)
- Norman Borlaug, "father of the Green Revolution"
- Marilyn Carroll, neuroscience professor
- Maxim Cheeran, associate professor of virology and neurovirology; Department of Veterinary Population Medicine
- Eli Coleman, director of the Program in Human Sexuality; editor of the Journal of Psychology and Human Sexuality
- Christopher J. Cramer, chemistry professor and vice president for research
- Paul Crowell, professor of physics
- Paul John Ellis, stellar astrophysics, nuclear physics
- Herbert Feigl, member of the Vienna Circle, a group of philosophers of the twentieth century; founder of the world's first center to study philosophy of science, the Minnesota Center for Philosophy of Science
- Edward Monroe Freeman, professor of botany; dean of the College of Agriculture, Forestry, and Home Economics
- Laura Gagliardi, theoretical and computational chemistry
- Seymour Geisser, founder of the School of Statistics; DNA evidence expert
- Florence Goodenough, psychology
- Irving I. Gottesman, psychology
- Alok Gupta, information scientist, economic engineer, and academic
- Sheng He, psychology
- Walter Heller, chairman of the President's Council of Economic Advisors under JFK
- Geoffrey Hellman, professor of philosophy
- Lawrence R. Jacobs, political science
- Timothy R. Johnson, political science and law; noted for his work covering the Supreme Court of the United States
- Miranda Joseph, professor of gender, women and sexuality
- James Kakalios, professor of physics, noted for his work with comic book fans
- Pinar Karaca-Mandic, professor of healthcare management
- Ancel Keys, nutritionist, inventor of K-rations
- Frederick Klaeber, Beowulf scholar
- Izaak Kolthoff, "father of analytical chemistry"
- Sylvain Lesné, Alzheimer's researcher, formerly at the Department of Neurology and Neuroscience, University of Minnesota Medical School
- Anatoly Liberman, Germanic scholar; author of An Analytic Dictionary of English Etymology
- David Lykken, professor of psychology and psychiatry; founder of Minnesota Twin Family Study
- George Morrison, art professor
- Richard T. Murphy, Jr., landscape architecture professor
- Katherine Nash, sculpture professor
- Edward P. Ney, astronomy and physics professor; discovered cosmic ray heavy nuclei
- Julia Anna Norris, physical education director
- Peg O'Connor, professor of Philosophy and Women's Studies at Gustavus Adolphus College, Wittgensteinian, feminist philosopher
- Michael Osterholm, School of Public Health professor
- Suhas Patankar, mechanical engineering; mechanical engineering; computational thermofluids
- Daniel Pesut, professor of nursing
- Ralph Rapson, architect and head of the school of architecture
- Juan Rosai, professor of anatomical pathology and discoverer of medical conditions such as Rosai-Dorfman disease and desmoplastic small round cell tumor, appointed professor and director of Anatomic Pathology at the University of Minnesota Medical School 1974–1985
- Eugene Rousseau, saxophone instructor
- Naomi Scheman, professor of Philosophy and Gender, Women's and Sexuality Studies
- B. F. Skinner, former psychology professor, behaviorist
- Aaron Sojourner, professor of management
- Ephraim Sparrow, mechanical engineering; thermodynamics and heat transfer
- Ellen Stekert, professor of English and folklorist
- Maurice Cole Tanquary, professor of entomology
- Allen Tate, literature professor, poet
- Valerie Tiberius, professor of philosophy
- Andrew H. Van de Ven, Vernon H. Heath Chair of Organizational Innovation and Change; professor, Carlson School of Management
- Anna Augusta Von Helmholtz-Phelan, assistant professor emeritus of English
- Gabriel P. Weisberg, professor of art history emeritus
- David Weissbrodt, regent professor emeritus, scholar of human rights law and co-founder of the Center for Victims of Torture
- James Wright, literature professor, poet
- Blong Xiong, first Hmong person in the US to receive tenure at a major university
- Zhi-Li Zhang, computer science professor
- Jack Zipes, German professor, translator and scholar of fairy tales

=== Present Regents Professors ===
- Fionnuala Ní Aoláin, Law
- Megan Gunnar, Child Psychology, Institute for Child Development
- Patricia Hampl, English
- Timothy P. Lodge, Chemistry
- Lawrence Que Jr., Inorganic Chemistry
- Steven Ruggles, History and Population Studies
- David Tilman, Ecology, Evolution, and Behavior
- Donald Truhlar, Chemistry
- Christopher Uggen, Sociology
- List of people from Minneapolis
- List of people from Saint Paul, Minnesota
