= Scott Freeman =

Scott Freeman may refer to:

- Scott Freeman (economist)
- Scott Freeman (voice actor)
