= Michelle Muldrow =

American painter (born 1968)

Michelle Anne Muldrow (born 1968) is an American painter known for her interior landscapes of big-box retail stores. She studied painting in high school and college.

The paintings, in Muldrow's words, are "…not only the actual structural space and overwhelming chaos of goods, but also the psychology and vernacular of American consumerism." Muldrow paints using gouache. She draws on traditional landscape painting to focus on non-traditional subjects.

== Education ==
- 1986–1990 University of Minnesota, Bachelor of Fine Arts
- 2004 Cooper Union Summer Arts Residency

== Awards ==
2009 Creative Workforce Fellowship Grant, Cuyahoga County, Ohio.

== Publications ==
2010 New American Paintings, Midwest Edition.
