= Amit Bando =

American analyst

Amit Bando is an economic analyst and policy scientist. He works with the private sector on clean technology finance issues and with organizations such as the International Energy Agency (IEA) and the Global Green Growth Institute (3GI) on program design and implementation issues.

== Education ==
Bando completed his graduate and post-graduate studies in Economics and Statistics at the University of Minnesota, Delhi School of Economics and St. Stephen's College, Delhi. He is based in Paris.

== Career ==
Earlier in his career, Bando has taught at the Universities of Chicago, Minnesota and Illinois, and New Mexico State University.

During his career as a policy scientist at the United States Department of Energy and an international consultant, Bando has worked in over 60 nations to promote innovative financing of clean energy initiatives and climate change mitigation/adaptation options. In the past five years alone, he has programmed over $1.5 billion worldwide. In addition, he has helped establish the Chicago Climate Exchange, led the development of the US National Energy Modeling System (NEMS) and represented the US at the Rio Earth Summit as well as at other ministerial forums on energy efficiency, climate change and the environment. He has developed several widely used monitoring and evaluation tools for low-carbon initiatives.

As an entrepreneur, Bando has founded an international management advisory firm, currently operating with a $50 million (annual) portfolio of projects in urban clean infrastructure development, institutional reform, governance and micro-finance. In the US, his pioneering efforts have provided greater access to clean technology alternatives among minority populations. In addition, he has founded the Center for Econometric Modeling and Forecasting (CEMAF) -- a for-profit research institution working on US-Mexico border issues.

Bando has published papers on the economic evaluation of environmental impacts and presented numerous workshops on clean investment finance and environmental management. He has helped private sector entities understand development-financing issues and has designed/implemented training programs for agencies such as the Asian Development Bank (ADB), World Bank, USAID, NASA, United States Environmental Protection Agency (USEPA) and the United States Department of Energy (USDOE). Working with legal experts, Mr. Bando often testifies on the economic implications of regulations on energy and the environment.
