= Knut Lindh =

Norwegian author (born 1951)

- Born: June 11, 1951 (age 75); Oslo, Norway
- Occupation: Author
- Writing career
- Genres: Fiction and non-fiction

Knut Lindh (born 11 June 1951) is a Norwegian author. He has worked for several media companies, among others The Norwegian News Agency (NTB), The Norwegian Broadcasting Corporation (NRK), TV 2 Norway and National Geographic. Lindh graduated from The Norwegian School of Journalism in 1977 and has studied international communication and politics at the University of Minnesota. He published his first book in 1985 and has since then written novels, biographies and dictionaries. Lindh was awarded the "Fresh Blood" prize 2009 for Dead Man Rises. The prize is awarded annually for the best Norwegian crime novel debut.

== Bibliography ==
- Clemens Saers: lærer på liv og død? (Clemens Saers: teacher on life and death) (2022)
- Hvem drepte Jan Wiborg? (Who Killed Jan Wiborg?) (2014)
- Blindebukk (Blind Man's Buff) (2013)
- Muhammed: kriger og profet (Muhammad: The Warrior Prophet) (2012)
- Blodsbrødre (Blood Brothers) (2010)
- Når den døde våkner (Dead Man Rises) (2009)
- Barack Obama: veien til Det hvite hus (Barack Obama: The Road to the White House) (2009)
- Adolf Hitler: blod og ære (Adolf Hitler: Blood and Honour) (2006)
- Leiv Eiriksson oppdager Amerika (Leif Eriksson Discovers America) (2004)
- Vikings. The Discovery of America. (2000)
- Blomster og blod: roman om det 20. århundret (Flowers and Blood.) (1999)
