= Sanjay Mittal =

- Education: Indian Institute of Technology, Kanpur; University of Minnesota
- Scientific career
- Fields: Aerospace Engineering
- Workplaces: Indian Institute of Technology, Kanpur

Sanjay Mittal is a Professor of computational fluid dynamics in the Department of Aerospace Engineering at Indian Institute of Technology Kanpur, India.

== Early life and education ==
After doing his B.Tech. from IIT Kanpur in 1988, he got enrolled at University of Minnesota, Twin Cities for M.S. program. He then received his Ph.D. and worked as a research associate under Tayfun Tezduyar.

== Career ==
After working for two years at Army High Performance Computing Center he returned to India and joined IIT Kanpur in the year of 1994 as an assistant professor. He is known to make significant contributions to the development of finite element algorithms for high-performance computing and Bluff Body Flows.

== Awards ==
Mittal has been the recipient of various awards.

- 2006 Shanti Swarup Bhatnagar Prize for Science and Technology
- 2016 G. D. Birla Award for Scientific Research
