= Deborah Rubin =

American painter (born 1948)

Deborah A. Rubin (born April 17, 1948) is an American watercolor painter who is well known for her hyper-realism paintings of flowers, boats, and street scenes. Her work was described as "making the ordinary look extraordinary" by Watercolor magazine writer Stanley Marcus.

== Biography ==
Rubin was born in Chicago and raised in the suburb of Highland Park. She earned her bachelor's degree in fine art from the University of Illinois at Urbana–Champaign and took a graduate painting class from Peter Busa at the University of Minnesota. Since 1979, she has lived in Amherst, Massachusetts.

== Permanent collections ==
The Michele & Donald D'Amour Museum of Fine Arts of the Springfield Museums (in Springfield, Massachusetts), Zimmerli Art Museum (Rutgers University), Harvard University, Vassar College, Fidelity Investments and Cabot Corporation are among the many permanent collections holding her work.

== Publications ==
Rubin's paintings were featured in Splash 8: Watercolor Discoveries, North Light Books; Watercolor magazine; and The Artist's Magazine. They have been reviewed in many newspapers, including The Washington Postand Pittsburgh Post-Gazette.

== Exhibitions ==
Rubin's works have been exhibited in many shows, including the American Watercolor Society, New England Watercolor Society, Audubon Artists, Watercolor USA, Milwaukee Art Museum, and National Academy of Design.

== One-woman shows ==
Rubin has had nine shows at R. Michelson Gallery in Northampton, Massachusetts and three at Coconut Grove Galleries in Miami, Florida. She has exhibited at Capricorn Gallery in Bethesda, Maryland; Quadrum Gallery in Chestnut Hill, Massachusetts; Louis Newman Gallery in Beverly Hills, California; Zimmerman-Saturn Gallery in Nashville, Tennessee; McGrath-Dunham Gallery in Castine, Maine and many other galleries.
