= S. Simon Wong =

- Education: UC Berkeley; University of Minnesota
- Scientific career
- Fields: non-volatile memory, RF integrated circuits, copper interconnect

S. Simon Wong is a professor in the Stanford Department of Electrical Engineering. He is affiliated faculty in the Stanford Non-Volatile Memory Technology Research Initiative (NMTRI), System X Alliance, and Bio-X.

== Education ==
S. Simon Wong received two bachelor's degrees from the University of Minnesota: electrical engineering and mechanical engineering. He completed a M.S. and Ph.D. in electrical engineering from the University of California, Berkeley.

== Academic career and research ==
Wong joined the faculty of Stanford Department of Electrical Engineering in 1988.

He studies the fabrication and design of high-performance integrated circuits. His work focuses on understanding and overcoming the limitations of circuit performance imposed by device, interconnect, and on-chip components.

== Awards and honors ==
- Fellow, IEEE
