= Donn W. Parson =

Donn W. Parson (Ph.D, University of Minnesota, 1964) is a Professor of Communication Studies at the University of Kansas and the former Director of Forensics at the University of Kansas from 1964 to 1988, during which period he led KU to three national championships.

== Championships ==
Parson coached KU to National Debate Tournament(NDT) championship in 1970, 1976, and 1983. Under Parson, KU also had five NDT semi-finals appearances. Parson previously coached the University of Minnesota to the finals of the NDT in 1963, losing to Dartmouth College.

== Debate Awards ==
Parson received the Coach of the Year Award presented by Georgetown University (1971), the Coach of the Year Award presented by the University of Utah (1974), the Distinguished Coaching Award presented by Emory University (1980), and the Coach of the Year Award presented by Baylor University (1981), the Lucy Keele Award for contributions to collegiate forensics by the NDT Board of Trustees (1996), and the George Ziegelmueller Award for Contributions to American Debate (2003). (

== Teaching Awards ==
He received the Chancellor's Award for Excellence in Teaching (1983), the Kemper Fellowship for Teaching Excellence (1997), and the Outstanding Educator in Argumentation and Debate Award from CSCA (1999). In 2006, Parson received the Chancellor's Club Career Teaching Award. In 2014, Parson won the Wallace A. Bacon Teaching Award from the National Communication Association. The award recognizes a "lifetime of outstanding teaching" and is given to retired educators.

== General Recognition ==
Parson edited or authored several academic texts on argumentation (such as Process of Social Influence: Readings in Persuasion (1972) and False Metaphor and Presence in Argument (1990)). In 2011 Parson was inducted into the Central States Communication Association’s Hall of Fame.
