= Harry Rowsell =

Canadian veterinarian

Harry Cecil Rowsell
- Born: 29 May 1921; Toronto, Ontario
- Died: 3 February 2006 (aged 84)
- Occupation: veterinarian

Harry Cecil Rowsell, OC (29 May 1921 – 3 February 2006) was a Canadian veterinarian, pathologist, animal welfare advocate and humanist.

Born in Toronto, Ontario, he served as a lieutenant in the Royal Canadian Navy during World War II. Upon his return, he received a Doctor of Veterinary Medicine from the Ontario Veterinary College in 1949, a D.V.P.H. from the University of Toronto in 1950, and a Ph.D. from the University of Minnesota in 1956. In 1946, he married Anne Bradshaw. They had one daughter: Carole and three sons: Paul, Craig and John. He also has four grandchildren: Bronwyn, Claire, Philip, and Graham

From 1953 to 1956, he was an assistant professor in the Department of Bacteriology at the Ontario Veterinary College. From 1958 to 1965, he was a professor and head of pathological physiology. From 1965 to 1968, he was head of the Department of Veterinarian Pathology, West College of Veterinary Medicine at the University of Saskatchewan. From 1970 to 1986, he was a professor in the Department of Pathology in the Faculty of Medicine at the University of Ottawa.

In 1968, he established the Canadian Council on Animal Care, was its first executive director, and was the first recipient of the CCAC Outstanding Service Award. In 1987, he was made an Honorary Associate of the Royal College of Veterinary Surgeons.

In 1988, he was the first veterinarian made an Officer of the Order of Canada for being "recognized and respected throughout the world for his outstanding contributions to the promotion of the responsible and humane treatment of animals in biomedical and scientific research".
