= J. B. Edwards =

American dramatist

J. B. Edwards (born October 3, 1951) is an American playwright known for works including: William’s Last Chance (2001), A Family Reunion (2002), Una Reunion Familiar (2003), The Sanctuary (2003), Three Women Dating Henry (2004), The Day Einstein Died (2005), Einstein’s Secret Letters (2005), The Best of Everything (2006), A Delicate Matter (2007), Requiem for a Marriage (2008) and Sister Stories (2009). His works are a study of typical American lives in the late 20th century, and were influenced by the great American playwrights Arthur Miller and Edward Albee. Edwards' non-fiction books include: The Coming Cancer Breakthroughs (2001), Men Head East, Woman Turn Right (2006) and Plays by J.B. Edwards (2012). His fiction books include: Faagraph of an Ordinary Man and China Dreams.

Edwards was born in Bronx, New York, and after a Ph.D. from the University of Minnesota, did a stint in the U.S. Army. Coming back to New York for good, he began a career as a writer, poet and novelist. Ironically, his first artistic success was as a painter, with his first shows in New York in the 1980s. He continues to be a prolific painter of edgy abstract art, and his paintings are represented in several galleries and corporations in the U.S. Later in his career, Edwards began to write plays, and enjoys a continuing success in the Off-Broadway theater scene. He recently ventured into film work, writing and directing the movie version of his play Three Women Dating Henry.

J. B. Edwards is a member of the Dramatists Guild, the National Arts Club, and The Players Club of New York.
