= Henry Byerly =

American philosopher (1935–2016)

Henry C. Byerly
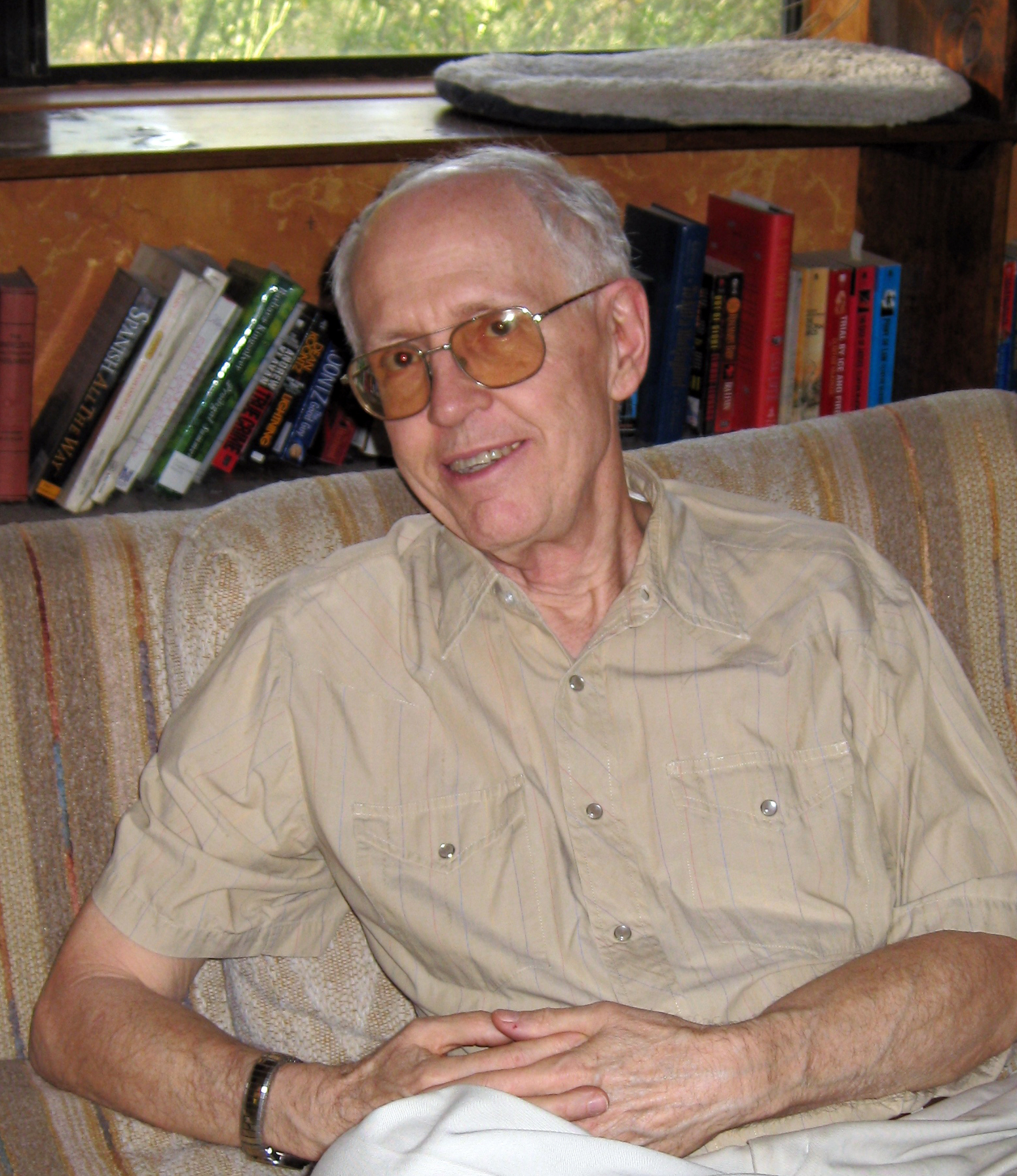
- Born: August 7, 1935; St. Paul, Minnesota, US
- Died: December 28, 2016 (aged 81); Tucson, Arizona, US
- Spouse: Rosemarie (m. 1962)

Education
- Education: PhD from University of Minnesota in 1967
- Alma mater: University of Minnesota

Philosophical work
- School: Analytical
- Institutions: University of Arizona
- Main interests: Philosophy of Science, Logic, Evolutionary Theory
- Notable works: A Primer of Logic, The Many Faces of Science
- Notable ideas: Physical causality consists of properties of energetic reaction.

Henry Clement Byerly (August 7, 1935 – December 28, 2016) was an American philosopher known for his work in philosophy of science, logic and evolutionary theory. He was Professor Emeritus at the University of Arizona, where he taught from 1967–1995.

== Education ==
Henry Byerly attended the University of Minnesota, where he earned an undergraduate degree in mathematics and physics, a master's degree in mathematics, and a PhD in philosophy. His PhD was given for his 1967 thesis "The Ontological Status of Theoretical Entities.". He studied for his doctorate under May Brodbeck, a student of Gustav Bergmann.

== Bibliography ==
=== Books ===
- Byerly, Henry C. (1973). A Primer of Logic. Harper & Row. ISBN 9780060411138.
- Byerly, Henry C.; Stevenson, Leslie F. (1995). The Many Faces of Science: An Introduction to Scientists, Values and Society. Westview Press. ISBN 9780813320168.

=== Selected Papers ===
- Byerly, Henry C.; Lazara, Vincent A. (1973). "Realist Foundations of Measurement". Philosophy of Science. 40 (1): 10–28. doi:10.1086/288493. JSTOR 186357.
- Byerly, Henry C. (1976). "Explaining and Exploiting Placebo Effects". Perspectives in Biology and Medicine. 19 (3): 423–437. doi:10.1353/pbm.1976.0038. PMID 60737.
- Byerly, Henry C. (1979). "Substantial Causes and Nomic Determination". Philosophy of Science. 46 (1): 57–81. doi:10.1086/288850.
- Bernstein, Harris; Byerly, Henry C.; Hopf, Frederick A.; Michod, Richard A.; Vemulapalli, G. Krishna (1983). "The Darwinian Dynamic". The Quarterly Review of Biology. 58 (2): 185–207. doi:10.1086/413216. JSTOR 2828805.
- Bernstein, Harris; Byerly, Henry C.; Hopf, Frederick A.; Michod, Richard A. (1985). "Genetic Damage, Mutation, and the Evolution of Sex". Science. 229 (4719): 1277–1281. Bibcode:1985Sci...229.1277B. doi:10.1126/science.3898363. PMID 3898363.
- Byerly, Henry C.; Michod, Richard E. (1991). "Fitness and Evolutionary Explanation". Biology and Philosophy. 6 (1): 1–22. doi:10.1007/BF02426816.
