= Duane Ilstrup =

American medical statistician

Duane M. Ilstrup (1946 – February 9, 2021) is an American medical statistician and the highly cited author or co-author of over 500 scientific articles. He worked at the Mayo Clinic from 1970 until 2003, and also became an associate professor of biostatistics at Mayo Medical School.

Ilstrup was born in Buffalo, Minnesota. He obtained a B.A. in mathematics and physics from Augsburg College in 1968 and a master's degree in biometry from the University of Minnesota in 1970.
