= Timothy R. Johnson =

American political scientist and author

- Occupations: Author; Political scientist; Professor
- Awards: American Political Science Association Distinguished Teaching Award (2018)

Academic background
- Education: Gustavus Adolphus College; Washington University in St. Louis

Timothy Russell Johnson is an American political scientist, author, and professor of political science and law at the University of Minnesota.

== Education ==
Johnson graduated with a B.A. in Political Science and Russian Studies from Gustavus Adolphus College in 1993 and obtained a PhD in political science from Washington University in St. Louis in 1998.

== Career ==
In 1994 Timothy started his career as an instructor at the University College, Washington University in St. Louis. In 1998, he became an assistant professor at the department of Political Science, Southern Illinois University. In 2006, he became an assistant professor at the department of Political Science and Law, University of Minnesota. In 2006, he was promoted to an associate professor and in 2012 he became a professor at the department of Political Science and Law, University of Minnesota.

== Selected publications ==
- Network Analysis and the Law: Measuring the Legal Importance of Precedents at the U.S. Supreme Court (2007)
- The Influence of Oral Arguments on the U.S. Supreme Court (2006)
- The Logic of American Politics
- A Good Quarrel: America's Top Legal Reporters Share Stories from Inside the Supreme Court
- Oral Arguments and Coalition Formation on the U.S. Supreme Court: A Deliberate Dialogue
- Oral Arguments and Decision Making on the United States Supreme Court
- Religious Institutions and Minor Parties in the United States
- SCOTUS and COVID: How the Media Reacted to the Livestreaming of Supreme Court Oral Arguments

== Awards ==
In 2008, he received the Horace T. Morse Award. In 2018, he received the American Political Science Association Distinguished Teaching Award.
