= Michelle Oyen =

American materials scientist

Michelle Lynn Oyen
- Education: Michigan State University; University of Minnesota
- Scientific career
- Fields: biomechanics, biomaterials, nanoindentation
- Workplaces: Wayne State University; Washington University in St. Louis; East Carolina University; University of Cambridge
- Thesis: Ultrastructural characterization of time-dependent, inhomogeneous materials and tissues (2005)

Dr. Michelle Lynn Oyen is an American materials scientist who is an Associate Professor of Biomedical Engineering at Wayne State University. Her research expertise is in the mechanical characterization of biological tissues and biomimetic materials. Oyen has focused on maternal health, particularly through the lens of biomechanics. Her research aims to better understand and improve pregnancy outcomes by studying the mechanical properties of tissues involved in pregnancy and childbirth.

== Early life and education ==
Oyen was an undergraduate student in materials science at Michigan State University, where she earned a bachelor's degree in Materials Science and Engineering and master's degree in Engineering Mechanics. She moved to the University of Minnesota for graduate research, where she studied inhomogeneous materials and tissues. Her thesis proposed nanoindentation as a means to study local mechanical responses in biological tissue. After earning her doctorate, she joined the University of Virginia, where she spent a year as a research scientist in the Center for Applied Biomechanics.

== Research and career ==
In 2007, Oyen moved to the United Kingdom and joined Sidney Sussex College at the University of Cambridge, where she worked as a lecturer in biological materials. After six years at Sidney Sussex Oyen moved to Homerton College. She was made an associate professor in engineering in 2013. Her research considers biomaterials and tissue engineering. She was involved with the development of the biomedical engineering program at Cambridge. She also took part in public engagement, where she discussed how outputs of bioengineering would inform the design of buildings.

In 2018, Oyen joined the Department of Engineering at East Carolina University. She worked on the development of biomimetic materials to improve human health. For example, she was interested in making natural cartilage-like materials to replace joints. She helped to launch the biomaterials research cluster in 2019. She was particularly interested in the intersection between biomaterials and women's health. Oyen investigated how extreme weather events such as hurricanes or cyclones can trigger premature fatal membrane rupture and preterm birth. She moved to Washington University in St. Louis as an associate professor in 2022 and became the inaugural director of the Center for Women’s Health Engineering (CWH) in June 2021. In 2024, Oyen moved her lab to Wayne State University.

== Selected publications ==
- Handbook of nanoindentation with biological applications. Michelle L. Oyen. Singapore: Pan Stanford. 2011. ISBN 978-981-4241-89-2. OCLC 619946389.
- Britta Trappmann; Julien E Gautrot; John T Connelly; et al. (27 May 2012). "Extracellular-matrix tethering regulates stem-cell fate". Nature Materials. 11 (7): 642–649. doi:10.1038/nmat3339. ISSN 1476-1122. PMID 22635042. Wikidata Q34277544. (erratum)
- M. L. Oyen (5 December 2013). "Mechanical characterisation of hydrogel materials". International Materials Reviews. 59 (1): 44–59. doi:10.1179/1743280413y.0000000022. ISSN 0950-6608. Wikidata Q53101473.
- Eneko Axpe; Michelle L Oyen (25 November 2016). "Applications of Alginate-Based Bioinks in 3D Bioprinting". International Journal of Molecular Sciences. 17 (12): 1976. doi:10.3390/ijms17121976. ISSN 1422-0067. PMC 5187776. PMID 27898010. Wikidata Q28072396.
