= Sheng He =

Sheng He (born 1964, China) is a professor of psychology in the Department of Psychology, University of Minnesota.

He is broadly interested in the neural basis of human vision, visual attention, and visual awareness. His most influential works include the demonstration of adaptation to invisible visual patterns (such as gratings), and the depth of invisible processing during binocular suppression.

== Works ==
1. He, S., Cavanagh, P., and Intriligator, J. (1996) Attentional resolution and the locus of visual awareness. Nature, 383 334–337
2. He, S. & MacLeod, D. (2001) Orientation-Selective Adaptation and Tilt Aftereffect from invisible patterns, Nature, vol. 411, 473–476
3. Fang, F. & He, S. (2005) Cortical responses to invisible objects in the human dorsal and ventral pathways. Nature Neuroscience, 10, 1380–1385.
