= Cyril Hoyt =

American academic (1905–1979)

Cyril J. Hoyt (November 22, 1905 — December 16, 1979) was an American educator and academic. A long-time member of the University of Minnesota Department of Educational Psychology, he was known as the author of Hoyt's coefficient of reliability.

Hoyt's interest in the theory and practice of education developed during his teaching of mathematics and science for Minot Public Schools from 1928 to 1937. He became closely involved in educational research while pursuing higher degrees at the University of Minnesota. The generalization of the Kuder-Richardson's (1937) formulation of the coefficient of internal consistency reliability to a continuous case is often ascribed to Lee Cronbach (1951), despite the fact that Hoyt had already made this generalization a decade earlier. Hoyt retired in 1974.

== References (in chronological order) ==
- Kuder, G. & Richardson, M. (1937). The theory of estimation of test reliability. Psychometrika, 2, 151–160.
- Hoyt, C. (1941). Test reliability estimated by analysis of variance. Psychometrika, 6, 153-160
- Cronbach, L. J. (1951). Coefficient alpha and the internal structure of tests. Psychometrika, 16, 297–333.

Specific
