= Maxim Cheeran =

American virologist and neurovirologist

Maxim C-J. Cheeran is an American Associate Professor of virology and neurovirology at the University of Minnesota's Department of Veterinary Population Medicine. He trained as a veterinarian in India before earning a doctorate at the University of Minnesota, and specializes in infections of the central neural system.
