= Megan Rye =

- Born: 1975 (age 50–51); Seoul, South Korea
- Education: University of Minnesota

Megan Rye (born 1975 in Seoul, South Korea) is an American painter, living and working in Minneapolis, Minnesota. She studied at the Rhode Island School of Design (RISD), earning a BFA in Painting in 1998, with an Art History concentration. Her senior year at RISD was spent in Rome, as a participant in the European Honors Program. She was awarded an MFA in Painting from the University of Minnesota in 2003, where she received a Graduate School Fellowship. In 2005 Rye was a resident at the Skowhegan School of Painting and Sculpture in Maine.

Rye is represented by Forum Gallery in New York City and Galeria Omar Alonso in Puerto Vallarta, Mexico. Her work is included in private collections across the country. She is best known for large scale oil paintings of the ongoing conflict in Iraq. The primary source material for her work, are photographs taken by her brother while stationed in Iraq as a U.S. Marine. This work has been exhibited nationally and internationally, and has been the subject of two major solo exhibitions. The first, I Will Follow You into the Dark, opened at the Minneapolis Institute of Arts in 2007. This was followed by the 2008 exhibit, Long Night's Journey Into Day, at the Burnet Gallery, Chambers Hotel. Upcoming participation in exhibits include ROJO/RED, a 2011 exhibit in Mexico featuring internationally recognized contemporary artists. A 2011 solo exhibit will also occur in NYC.

In addition to gallery exhibits, this body of work has received consistent institutional support. Including fellowships from the Bush Foundation, the McKnight Foundation, the Jerome Foundation, and the Minnesota State Arts Board. Rye's work, particularly the Iraq paintings, has also been the subject of profiles and reviews in print, television, and public radio. She has become an ongoing journalistic subject for Pulitzer Prize nominated author Marya Hornbacher in essays as well as on the author's blog.

== Sources ==
- https://web.archive.org/web/20110727191240/http://minnesota.terprod.publicradio.org/display/web/2008/11/24/paintingwar/
- http://metromag.com/0p174a3171/megan-rye/
- https://web.archive.org/web/20091015132407/http://www.guernicamag.com/blog/820/marya_hornbacher_seeing_war_th/
- https://web.archive.org/web/20100405222551/http://www.mspmag.com/entertainment/people/26142.asp
- http://www.mnsun.com/articles/2010/07/03/headlines/764ed01bushartist.txt
- http://www2.artsmia.org/wiki/index.php/I_Will_Follow_You_Into_the_Dark
- http://www.startribune.com/entertainment/art/50968047.html
- http://www.startribune.com/entertainment/art/11385006.html?elr=KArks:DCiU1PciUoaEYY_4PcUU
- PRWeb
- http://mcad.edu/events-fellowships/mcknight-artist-fellowships-past-recipients
- http://www.mnartists.org/article.do?rid=118719
- https://web.archive.org/web/20121003060828/http://www.citypages.com/2008-12-17/calendar/megan-rye-a-long-night-s-journey-into-day/
- http://www.kare11.com/news/news_article.aspx?storyid=534450
- http://www.bushfellows.org/articles/show/74-Bush-Artist-Program-Introduces-2010-Fellows
