= Ole Moen =

Norwegian professor of American studies, born 1940

Dr. Ole O. Moen (born 3 August 1940) is professor emeritus in American Civilization at the University of Oslo, Norway, with a Ph.D. in American Studies from the University of Minnesota (1978). He was born in Hell, Nord-Trøndelag. Moen has a Cand. Philol. degree in English from the University of Oslo (1971) and an M.A. degree in American Studies from the University of Minnesota (1974). He is a member of the American academic merit organization Phi Kappa Phi.

Moen was a tenured professor in North American Area Studies at the Department of Literature, Area Studies, and European Languages at the University of Oslo from 1979 to 2010. Moen has had two Fulbright scholarships to the University of Minnesota and has been guest lecturer at The University of Wisconsin, Madison, The University of Arizona, Tucson, and George Washington University. Moen is also frequently used as an advisor to government departments, oil companies, and other companies who have links to the USA or who work together with American business companies in other parts of the world.

Moen specializes in American constitutional history, constitutional law, minority problems, and its political system. His main academic work is a book on the U.S. Supreme Court titled "Race, Color, and Partial Blindness: Affirmative Action under the Law" (2001). In 2010, Moen was awarded The Royal Medal of Merit, Gold Class, for his dissemination of knowledge of U.S. cultural and political affairs among Norwegians.

Moen is a Norwegian editor of The Journal of American History, a member of the board of The Norwegian Emigraant Museum and Research Center, and a former President of The Nordic Association for American Studies from 2001–2003. He was the Secretary General of The European Association for American Studies from 2002–2006, International Advisor for The Center for American Studies and Research at the American University of Beirut in Lebanon, and International Advisor for The Center for Studies of the United States of America at the University of Belgrade in Serbia.

== Selected bibliography ==
- 2010: "Den amerikanske borgerkrigen: krigen mellom brodre, 2 1861-1865"
- 2009: "USAs presidenter: fra George Washington til Barack Obama"
- 2009: "USA: Annerledeslandet i en ny tid"
- 2008: "USAs presidenter: fra George Washington til George W. Bush"
- 2005: "USA: annerledeslandet i vest"
- 2001: "Race, Color, and Partial Blindness: Affirmative Action under the Law"
- 1996: ed. with Leif Magne Lervik, "Frontier and Visions: A Casebook in 'American Studies'"
- 1994: "Inside the USA"
