= Frederick Charles Frey =

Frederick Charles Frey was born near Amite, Louisiana, on November 8, 1891. He was a graduate of Amite High School, Louisiana State University, and the University of Minnesota, where he received his Ph.D. degree in 1929.

He served under Gen. John J. Pershing in 1916 on the Mexican Border as part of the mobilization of the National Guard to halt the raids of Pancho Villa, the Mexican revolutionary. He was commissioned as a first lieutenant during World War I and discharged as a major in 1919.

He served as an instructor, track coach, assistant professor, associate professor, and professor at Louisiana State University from 1922 until 1962. He was the founding chairman of the Department of Sociology from 1929 to 1938, and served as dean of men from 1930 to 1932. He was the dean of the College of Arts and Sciences from 1931 until 1941, and served as dean of the university from 1939 until 1949, then again from 1951 to 1952. He was named acting President of LSU in 1947.

Frey was a pioneer in the field of race relations with fellow sociologists P. A. Sorokin and E. Franklin Frazier, and offered the first course in race relations at a southern university.
