= Alan R. Price =

American academic (born 1942)

Alan Price
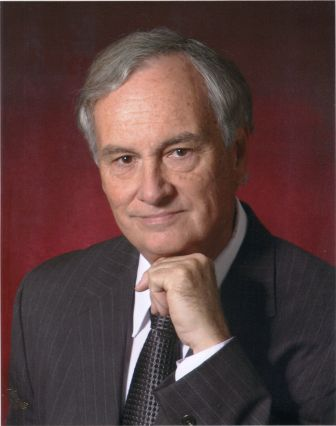
- Born: January 15, 1942; Pontiac, Michigan, United States
- Education: Florida State University; University of Minnesota; Michigan State University
- Known for: research integrity issues and research misconduct investigations
- Spouse: Katherine Ralph
- Awards: Josiah Macy Junior Sabbatical Fellowship award, and National Institutes of Health and United States Public Health Service distinguished service awards
- Scientific career
- Fields: Investigating research misconduct
- Workplaces: National Institute of Health
- Doctoral advisor: Huber Warner
- Doctoral students: Ronald A. Hites

Alan R. Price is an academic who served as the associate director for investigative oversight of the Office of Research Integrity (ORI) at the National Institute of Health and the United States Public Health Service. Price's job involved reviewing the handling of allegations and reports of inquiries and investigations of scientific misconduct or research misconduct. He served 17 years as a senior official of the Office of Research Integrity.

== History ==
Price received his bachelor's degree in chemistry from Florida State University in 1964, and his doctorate in biochemistry from the University of Minnesota in 1968, followed by postdoctoral research in biochemistry at Michigan State University.

He served on the faculty at the University of Michigan Medical School as assistant professor and tenured associate professor from 1970 to 1978, and in 1978 he became assistant dean for research development of the medical school, and in 1981 was appointed assistant vice president for research for the whole University of Michigan. From 1987 to 1989 he held positions in aging grants administration and in human subject protection in AIDS research at the National Institute of Health, and in 1989 transferred to its new Office of Scientific Integrity, which became the United States Department of Health and Human Services' Office of Research Integrity in 1989. From 2000 to 2006 he served as the ORI Associate Director for Investigative Oversight, the chief biomedical research fraud investigator of the federal government. He retired from federal service in spring 2006 and established a consulting service for cases of research misconduct and research fraud.
