= Scott Freeman (economist) =

American economist

Scott John Freeman (June 9, 1954 – July 23, 2004) was an American economist. He received his undergraduate degree from the University of Wisconsin–Madison and earned his Ph.D. from the University of Minnesota in 1983. Between undergraduate and graduate school he worked for the Peace Corps in Africa.

Freeman started his professional academic career at Boston College and was subsequently affiliated with the University of Western Ontario, the University of California, Santa Barbara and University of Texas at Austin. He also served as a research associate at the Federal Reserve Banks of Dallas and Minneapolis.

Freeman made several lasting contributions to economics, particularly related to the optimal quantity of money, money and the business cycle, and the payments system. During his Nobel lecture, Finn Kydland spent a long time talking about Freeman and describing him as a superb economist. Kydland remarked that he wished two people could have been alive to see him receive the Nobel Prize, Finn's dad, and the second, Freeman.

Freeman died on July 23, 2004, after having struggled with Lou Gehrig's disease for several years.

== Textbook ==
- Modeling Monetary Economies (with Bruce Champ) 1st ed.: ISBN 0-471-57948-3, 2nd ed.: ISBN 0-521-78974-5.
