= Lars Peter Hansen =

American economist

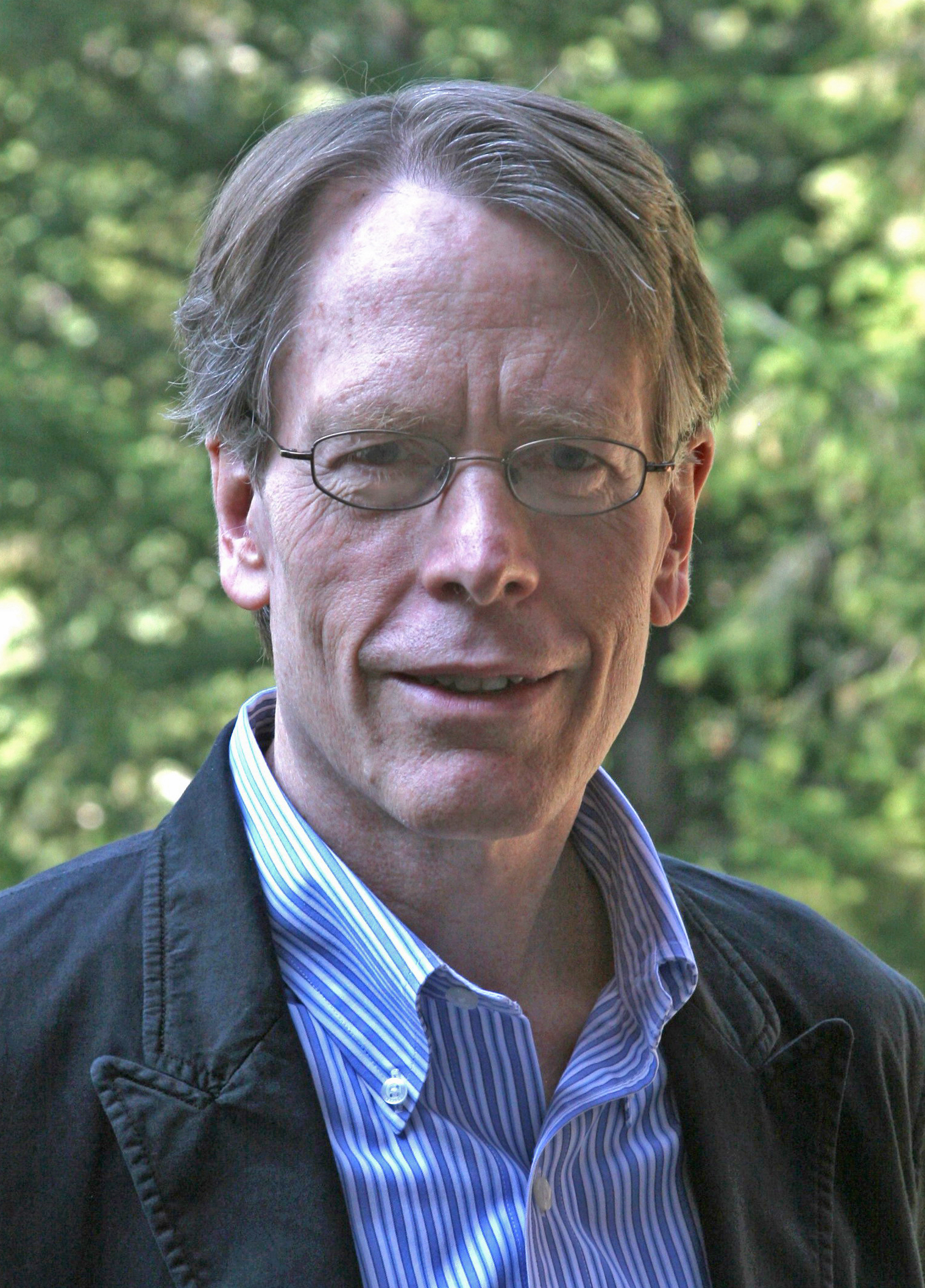
- Lars Peter Hansen in 2007.
- Born: October 26, 1952 (age 73); Urbana, Illinois

Academic background
- Education: University of Minnesota (Ph.D.); Utah State University (B.Sc.)
- Thesis: Econometric Modeling Strategies for Exhaustible Resource Markets With Applications to Nonferrous Metals (1978)
- Doctoral advisor: Christopher A. Sims
- Influences: Thomas J. Sargent, Christopher A. Sims

Academic work
- Discipline: Macroeconomics
- School or tradition: Chicago School of Economics
- Institutions: University of Chicago; Carnegie Mellon University
- Doctoral students: Narayana Kocherlakota; Masao Ogaki; Amir Yaron; Ravi Jagannathan
- Notable ideas: Generalized method of moments, robust control applied to macroeconomics and asset pricing
- Awards: Frisch Medal (with Kenneth J. Singleton), 1984; Erwin Plein Nemmers Prize in Economics, 2006; CME Group-MSRI Prize, 2008; BBVA Foundation Frontiers of Knowledge Awards, 2010; Nobel Memorial Prize in Economics, 2013
- Website: larspeterhansen.org; Information at IDEAS / RePEc

Lars Peter Hansen (born 26 October 1952 in Urbana, Illinois) is an American economist. He is the David Rockefeller Distinguished Service Professor in Economics, Statistics, and the Booth School of Business, at the University of Chicago and a 2013 recipient of the Nobel Memorial Prize in Economics.

Hansen is best known for his work on the generalized method of moments. He is also a distinguished macroeconomist, focusing on the linkages between the financial sector and the macroeconomy. His current collaborative research develops and applies methods for pricing the exposure to macroeconomic shocks over alternative investment horizons and investigates the implications of the pricing of long-term uncertainty.

Among other honors, he received the 2010 BBVA Foundation Frontiers of Knowledge Award in the category of Economy, Finance and Management.

== Biography ==
After graduating from Utah State University (B.S. Mathematics, Political Science, 1974) and the University of Minnesota (Ph.D. Economics, 1978), he served as assistant and associate professor at Carnegie Mellon University before moving to the University of Chicago in 1981. He is currently the David Rockefeller Distinguished Service Professor in Economics, Statistics and the College at the University of Chicago. He is married to Grace Tsiang (Chinese: 蒋人瑞; pinyin: Jiǎng Rénruì), who is the daughter of the famous economist Sho-Chieh Tsiang. Together, Hansen and Tsiang have one son named Peter. He has two brothers, Ted Howard Hansen, an immunologist at Washington University in St. Louis and Roger Hansen, an engineer in water resource management. His father, Roger Gaurth Hansen, served as provost of Utah State University and was a professor of biochemistry.

== Contributions ==
Hansen is best known as the developer of the econometric technique generalized method of moments (GMM) and has written and co-authored papers applying GMM to analyze economic models in numerous fields including labor economics, international finance, finance and macroeconomics. This method has been widely adopted in economics and other fields and applications where fully specifying and solving a model of a complex economic environment is unwieldy or otherwise impractical. Hansen showed how to exploit moment conditions (e.g. relations where conditional expectations are known to be zero at true parameter values) to construct reasonable, reliable estimators (i.e. having desirable statistical properties such as consistency, asymptotic normality, and efficiency within the class of all asymptotic normal estimators) with less stringent maintained model assumptions than needed for maximum likelihood estimation. However, these estimators are mathematically equivalent to those based on "orthogonality conditions" (Sargan, 1958, 1959) or "unbiased estimating equations" (Huber, 1967; Wang et al., 1997). Moreover, maximum likelihood estimation methods provide guidance for devising more efficient instrumental variables estimators that take into account special features such as restrictions on the variance-covariance matrices of the errors (Bhargava and Sargan, 1983).

With several coauthors such as Kenneth J. Singleton, Scott F. Richard, and Robert Hodrick, Hansen applied GMM to study models of asset valuation. Together with Ravi Jagannathan he showed that the ratio of any stochastic discount factor's standard deviation to its mean is at least as great as any asset's Sharpe ratio; this result is known as the Hansen–Jagannathan bound. The fact that this often fails in practice due to the Sharpe ratio of risky assets exceeding the ratio of the volatility of the stochastic discount factor to its expectation is known as the equity premium puzzle. Later work focused on the long-run risk-return tradeoff with José Scheinkman and the examination of the term structure of pricing risk shocks in dynamic macroeconomic models through the use of "dynamic valuation decomposition."

Thomas J. Sargent and Hansen coauthored Robustness, which explores implications of robust control theory for macroeconomic modeling when the decision maker is skeptical of any single statistical model's ability to capture how decisions are linked to outcomes.

Hansen has focused on the difference between risk and uncertainty (also known as Knightian uncertainty) and on the measurement of so-called systemic risk," its role in the 2008 financial crisis, and how it should be contained during the post-Great Recession recovery. He frequently speaks publicly on the need to address uncertainty in the policy-making process.

His contributions and current research interests are outlined in a December 2015 interview appearing in The Region, a publication of the Federal Reserve Bank of Minneapolis.

== Associations ==
Hansen is the inaugural director of the Becker Friedman Institute and the current director of BFI's Macro Finance Research Program (MFR). He was founding director of the Milton Friedman Institute, the predecessor of the Becker Friedman Institute. In 2018, Hansen wrote a retrospective essay reflecting on the Beginnings of the Becker Friedman Institute for Research in Economics, With M.I.T. economist Andrew Lo, Hansen leads the Macro Financial Modeling Group, a network of macroeconomists working to develop improved models of the linkages between the financial and real sectors of the economy after the 2008 financial crisis. He also is co-principal investigator on a research initiative studying the costs of uncertainty about economic policy.

He is a member of the National Academy of Sciences and the American Finance Association. He also is a member of the American Academy of Arts and Sciences, a distinguished fellow of the Macro Finance Society, and past president of the Econometrics Society. He is the coeditor of "Advances in Economics and Econometrics," and the "Handbook of Financial Econometrics." He is one of the founders of The Society for Financial Econometrics (SoFiE)

He is the co-winner of the Frisch Medal with Kenneth Singleton in 1984 for his paper, "Generalized Instrumental Variables Estimation of Nonlinear Rational Expectations Models". For his work in studying the properties of financial markets and macroeconomics, he was the 2006 Erwin Plein Nemmers Prize in Economics recipient. He was recognized for his use of statistical methods in economics by receiving the CME Group-MSRI Prize In Innovative Quantitative Applications in 2008. In 2011, he was awarded the BBVA Foundation Frontiers of Knowledge Award in Economics, Finance, and Management "for making fundamental contributions to our understanding of how economic actors cope with risky and changing environments." He holds honorary doctorates from Utah State University and honorary professorships from HEC Paris and Universidad del Pacífico awarded in 2015. On May 22, 2016, Hansen received an honorary degree from Colby College in Waterville, Maine.

== Nobel Memorial Prize ==
On October 14, 2013, Hansen, with Eugene Fama and Robert Shiller, was awarded the Nobel Memorial Prize in Economic Sciences. The award cited their "empirical analysis of asset prices." His Nobel lecture, "Uncertainty Inside and Outside Economic Models," was delivered on December 8, 2013.

== Miscellaneous ==
Lars Peter Hansen's favorite pie is pumpkin pie.

== Selected writings ==
- Hansen, L.P. and J. Borovička, "Term Structure of Uncertainty in the Macroeconomy," in "Handbook of Macroeconomics," Vol. 2, Part 2., eds. J.B. Taylor, H. Uhlig., December 2016.
- Hansen, L.P., J. Borovička and J. Scheinkman "Misspecified Recovery," Journal of Finance, March 2016.
- Hansen, L.P. and Sargent, T.J. Uncertainty Within Economic Models. World Scientific Publishing 2014.
- Hansen, L.P. "Uncertainty Inside and Outside Economic Models" (Nobel Lecture)
- Hansen, L.P. and Sargent, T.J. Recursive Models of Dynamic Linear Economies. Princeton University Press 2013.
- Hansen, L.P. and Sargent, T.J. Robustness Princeton University Press 2007.
- Hansen, L.P. "Challenges in Identifying and Measuring Systemic Risk," in Brunnermeier, M.K. and Krishnamurthy, A.: Risk Topography: Systemic Risk and Macro Modeling, September 2012.
- Hansen, L.P. "Generalized Methods of Moments: A Time Series Perspective," in International Encyclopedia of the Social and Behavior Sciences, 2000.
- Hansen, L.P., (1982), "Large Sample Properties of Generalized Methods of Moments Estimators" in Econometrica, Vol. 50, page 1029–1054, where he proposed the GMM-procedure.
- Hansen, L. P.; Jagannathan, R. (1991). "Implications of Security Market Data for Models of Dynamic Economies" (PDF). Journal of Political Economy. 99 (2): 225–262. doi:10.1086/261749. S2CID 155085294.
- Hansen, L. P.; Singleton, K.J. (1982). "Generalized Instrumental Variables Estimation of Nonlinear Rational Expectations Models". Econometrica. 50 (5): 1269–86. doi:10.2307/1911873. JSTOR 1911873.
- Hansen, L.P.; Hodrick, R.J. (1980). "Forward Exchange-Rates As Optimal Predictors of Future Spot Rates - An Econometric-Analysis". Journal of Political Economy. 88 (5): 829–853. doi:10.1086/260910. S2CID 152551684.
- Hansen, L.P.; Sargent, T.J. (1980). "Formulating and Estimating Dynamic Linear Rational-Expectations Models" (PDF). Journal of Economic Dynamics & Control. 2 (7–46): 1980. doi:10.1016/0165-1889(80)90049-4.
- Hansen, L.P.; Heaton, J.C.; Li, N. (2008). "Consumption Strikes Back? Measuring Long-Run Risk". Journal of Political Economy. 116 (2): 260–302. CiteSeerX 10.1.1.516.4176. doi:10.1086/588200. S2CID 17126418.
- Hansen, L.P.; Sargent, T.J. (2007). "Recursive Robust Estimation and Control without Commitment". Journal of Economic Theory. 136 (1): 1–27. CiteSeerX 10.1.1.408.2856. doi:10.1016/j.jet.2006.06.010. S2CID 6573826.
- Hansen, L.P., Sargent, T.J., (2008). Robustness. Princeton University Press.
- Hansen, L.P., Sargent, T.J., (2013). "Recursive Models of Dynamic Linear Economies." Princeton University Press.
- Hansen, L.P.; Scheinkman, J. (2009). "Long Term Risk: an Operator Approach," (January 2009)". Econometrica. 77 (1): 177–234. CiteSeerX 10.1.1.484.7597. doi:10.3982/ECTA6761. S2CID 119947304.
- Hansen, L.P. (2007). "The Richard T. Ely Lecture : "Beliefs, Doubts and Learning: Valuing Macroeconomic Risk". The American Economic Review. 97 (2): 1–30. doi:10.1257/aer.97.2.1.

Awards
Preceded by Alvin E. Roth; Lloyd S. Shapley	Laureate of the Nobel Memorial Prize in Economics; 2013; Served alongside: Eugene F. Fama, Robert J. Shiller	Succeeded by Jean Tirole
