= Ravi Jagannathan =

American economist

- Born: c. 1949 (age 76–77)

Academic background
- Education: Carnegie Mellon University; Indian Institute of Management; University of Madras

Academic work
- Discipline: Financial economics
- Institutions: Northwestern University
- Awards: Alexander Henderson Award (1983)
- Website: Information at IDEAS / RePEc

Ravi Jagannathan is an American economist. He is a chaired professor at the Kellogg School of Management at Northwestern University. With the exception of the period 1989–1997 when he was a professor at the University of Minnesota, Jagannathan has been at Kellogg since graduate school.

Jagannathan received a bachelor's degree in mechanical engineering from the College of Engineering, Guindy of University of Madras in 1970, an MBA from the Indian Institute of Management Ahmedabad, India and his Ph.D. from Carnegie Mellon University.

His research interests are in the areas of asset pricing, capital markets and financial institutions. Along with Zhenyu Wang, in 1996 he advanced a variation on the capital asset pricing model known as "conditional CAPM." Some recent empirical work on options prices supports this model.

He is also among those known for the Hansen–Jagannathan bounds, which provide a way to use security market data to restrict the volatility of the stochastic discount factor.

In 2004–2025, Jagannathan served as President of the Western Finance Association. In 2024, he was elected as a Fellow of the American Finance Association.
