= Martin Eichenbaum =

American economist

Martin S. Eichenbaum
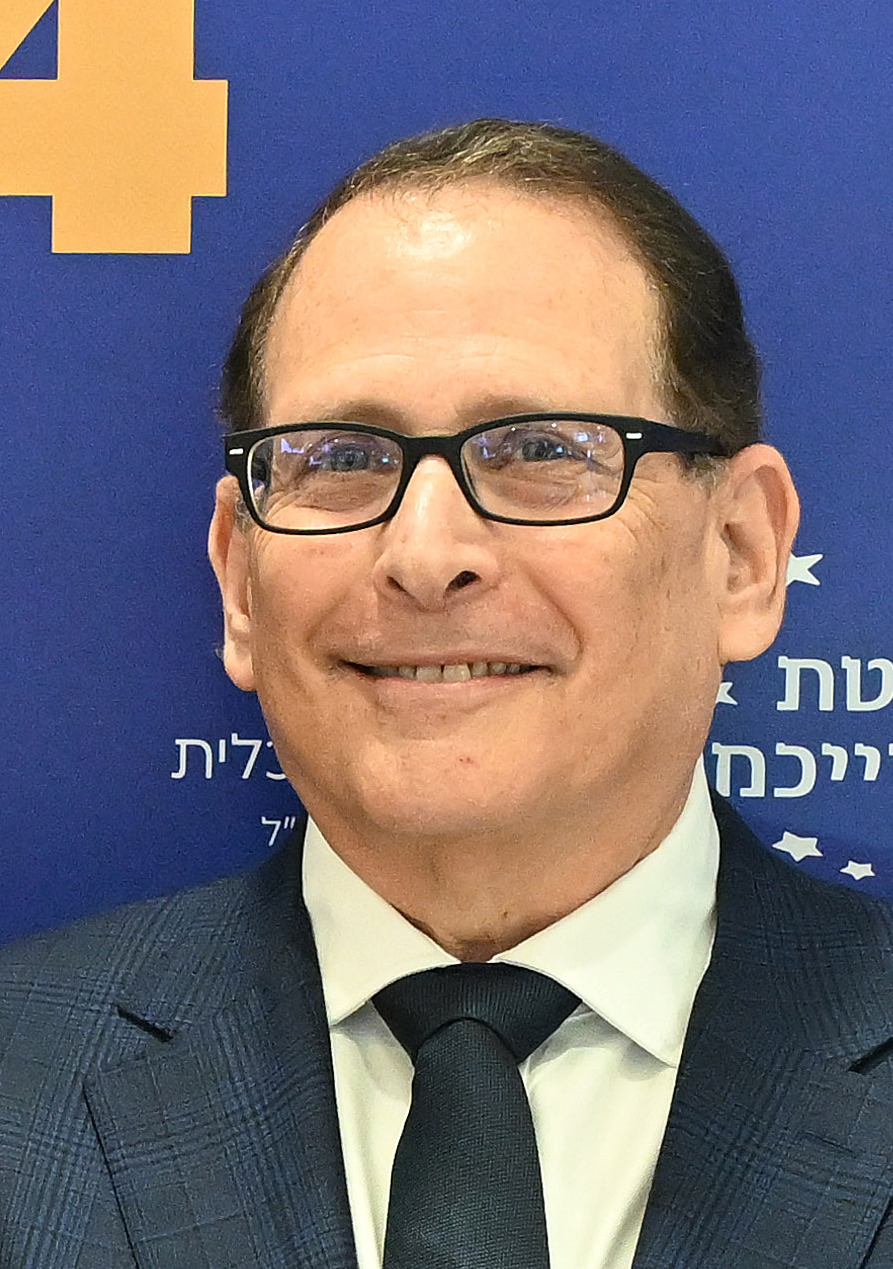
- Eichenbaum, 2024
- Born: August 23, 1954 (age 72)

Academic background
- Education: University of Minnesota; McGill University
- Doctoral advisor: Thomas J. Sargent

Academic work
- Discipline: Macroeconomics
- Institutions: Carnegie Mellon University; University of Chicago; University of Pennsylvania; Northwestern University
- Website: Information at IDEAS / RePEc

Martin Stewart Eichenbaum (born August 23, 1954) is the Charles Moskos professor of economics at Northwestern University, and the co-director of the Center for International Economics and Development. His research focuses on macroeconomics, international economics, and monetary theory and policy.

== Biography ==
After graduating from McGill University (B.Comm. in Economics, 1976) and the University of Minnesota (Ph.D. Economics, 1981) he served as an assistant professor at Carnegie Mellon University before moving to Northwestern University in 1988. He is currently the Charles Moskos professor of Economics at Northwestern University and, in addition, the co-director of the Center for International Economics and Development there. During his career, he also taught at Carnegie Mellon University, the University of Chicago, Harvard, and the University of Pennsylvania. In addition, he has been a consultant to the Federal Reserve Banks of Chicago, Atlanta, and San Francisco as well as the International Monetary Fund.

Eichenbaum is married to Yona and has two children, Rachel and Joseph.

Eichenbaum served on the Northwestern committee to fight anti-Semitism.

== Contributions ==
Eichenbaums's research focuses on macroeconomics, international economics, and monetary theory and policy. Specifically, he has been concerned with understanding aggregate economic fluctuations, studying the causes and consequences of exchange rate fluctuations, as well as the effect of monetary policy on postwar United States business cycles.

=== Selected papers ===
- Eichenbaum, Martin S; Rebelo, Sergio; Trabandt, Mathias (2020). "The Macroeconomics of Epidemics". National Bureau of Economic Research. Working Paper Series (26882). doi:10.3386/w26882.
- Craig Burnside; Martin Eichenbaum; Sergio Rebelo (August 2016). "Understanding Booms and Busts in Housing Markets". Journal of Political Economy. 124 (4): 1088–114. doi:10.1086/686732. S2CID 6276397.
- Lawrence J. Christiano; Martin Eichenbaum; Charles L. Evans (2005). "Nominal Rigidities and the Dynamic Effects of a Shock to Monetary Policy". Journal of Political Economy. 113 (1): 1–45. doi:10.1086/426038. ISSN 0022-3808. JSTOR 10.1086/426038. S2CID 158727660.
- Eichenbaum, Martin, Evans, Charles L. (1995). "Some Empirical Evidence on the Effects of Shocks to Monetary Policy on Exchange Rates". The Quarterly Journal of Economics. 110 (4): 975–1009. doi:10.2307/2946646. JSTOR 2946646.
- Christiano, Lawrence J., Eichenbaum, Martin, Evans, Charles L. (1999), J. B. Taylor; M. Woodford (eds.), Monetary policy shocks: What have we learned and to what end?, Handbook of Macroeconomics, vol. 1, Elsevier, pp. 65–148, doi:10.1016/S1574-0048(99)01005-8, ISBN 978-0-444-50156-1, ISSN 1574-0048, S2CID 15795853
- Craig Burnside; Martin Eichenbaum; Sergio Rebelo (December 2001). "Prospective Deficits and the Asian Currency Crisis" (PDF). Journal of Political Economy. 109 (6): 1155–1197. doi:10.1086/323271. hdl:10161/1983. JSTOR 323271. S2CID 14984128.
- Burnside, Craig, Eichenbaum, Martin, Rebelo, Sergio (April 1993). "Labor Hoarding and the Business Cycle". Journal of Political Economy. 101 (2): 245–73. doi:10.1086/261875. hdl:10161/2107. JSTOR 2138819. S2CID 6175373.
- Christiano, Lawrence J, Eichenbaum, Martin (June 1992) [1990]. "Current Real Business Cycle Theories and Aggregate Labor Market Fluctuations". Current Real-Business-Cycle Theories and Aggregate Labor-Market Fluctuations. Vol. 82. pp. 430–50. doi:10.4324/9780203070710.ch10 (inactive 12 July 2025). ISBN 978-0-415-16568-6. JSTOR 2117314.

== Associations ==
Eichenbaum was elected a Fellow of the American Academy of Arts and Sciences in 2013. He was elected a Fellow of the Royal Society of Canada in 2021. He is a fellow of the Econometric Society and a research associate at the National Bureau of Economic Research. He served as the co-editor of the American Economic Review from 2011 to 2015. He is now the co-editor of the NBER Macro Annual. In addition, he is on the board of directors of the Bank of Montreal.

In 2019, Eichenbaum became MAS Term professor at the National University of Singapore.
