= Extreme bounds analysis =

Econometric technique

In econometrics, extreme bounds analysis is a type of sensitivity analysis which attempts to determine the most extreme possible estimates for a fixed subset of allowed coefficients and a variable set of linear homogeneous restrictions. It was originally developed by Edward E. Leamer in 1983, and subsequently refined by Clive Granger and Harald Uhlig in 1990. It is a more precise method of measuring specification uncertainty than traditional econometrics because it incorporates prior information, and uses a systematic methodology to examine the fragility of coefficients. It allows researchers to obtain upper and lower limits for the parameter of interest for any possible set of explanatory variables.
