= Eric French (economist) =

Economist

Eric B. French
- Born: Santa Barbara, California
- Spouse: Meredith Crowley

Academic background
- Education: University of California, Berkeley; University of Wisconsin-Madison

Academic work
- Discipline: Labour Economics; Public Economics; Econometrics
- Institutions: University of Cambridge
- Website: Information at IDEAS / RePEc

Eric Baird French (born in Santa Barbara, California) is the Montague Burton Professor of Industrial Relations and Labour Economics at the University of Cambridge. He is also a co-director at the ESRC Centre for the Microeconomic Analysis of Public Policy, a Fellow at the Institute for Fiscal Studies and a Fellow at the Centre for Economic Policy Research. His research interests include: econometrics, labour and health economics.

== Academic career ==
French received a B.A. in Economics with highest honours from the University of California, Berkeley in 1992. He received a M.S. in 1997 and a PhD in 1999 in Economics, both from the University of Wisconsin-Madison. French worked at the Federal Reserve Bank of Chicago between 1999 and 2013, holding the positions of Economist, Senior Economist, and Research Advisor. In 2013, French was appointed as Professor of Economics at the University College of London (UCL). After working at UCL for seven years, he is currently the Montague Burton Professor of Industrial Relations and Labour Economics at the University of Cambridge.

French has also had visiting positions at Northwestern University in 2007, Northwestern-Kellogg in 2010, the Social Security Administration in 2008–9, the Cowles Foundation (Yale University) in 2012, and the Federal Reserve of Minneapolis in 2003, 2013 and 2018, as well as shorter stays at the Atlanta Fed, New York Fed, and Georgetown University. He has served on the executive committee for the Michigan Retirement Research Center since 2012.

French's research has been published in Econometrica, Review of Economic Studies, American Economic Review, Journal of Political Economy, Handbook of Labor Economics, Handbook of the Economics of Population Aging, Handbook of Aging and the Social Sciences, Annual Review of Economics, Review of Economics and Statistics, the Journal of Labor Economics, International Economic Review, Journal of Applied Econometrics, Journal of Human Resources, Economic Journal, Fiscal Studies, American Economic Journal: Policy, Lancet, and other publications.

He presently serves as an editor of the Journal of Labor Economics (2020–present). He has also served as editor of the Journal of Pension Economics and Finance (2016–20) and Fiscal Studies (2013–16), as well as on the editorial boards of Quantitative Economics (2009–16), Economic Inquiry (2008–10), and Journal of Pension Economics and Finance (2010–16).

== Publications ==
French has written over 40 papers and articles on topics in: medical expenditures of the elderly, minimum wage, disability insurance, Social Security reforms and pensions. Some of his noteworthy papers and articles are:

- "Industry Dynamics and the Minimum Wage: A Putty-Clay Approach" (2018), with Daniel Aaronson, Isaac Sorkin and Ted To. They develop a model of industry dynamics based on putty-clay technology, which is consistent with the documented response of the restaurant industry to minimum wage hikes.
- "The Effect of Disability Insurance Receipt on Labor Supply" (2016), with Jae Song. The paper estimates the effect of disability insurance on labour supply. It is shown that 30% of denied applicants and 15% of allowed applicants work several years after a disability determination decision.
- "The Spending and Debt Response to Minimum Wage Hikes" (2012), with Daniel Aaronson and Sumit Agarwal. They find that immediately following a minimum wage hike, household income rises on average by about $250 per quarter and spending by roughly $700 per quarter for households with minimum wage workers. Most of the spending response is caused by a small number of households who purchase vehicles.
- "The Minimum Wage, Restaurant Prices, and Labor Market Structure" (2008), with Daniel Aaronson and James MacDonald. The paper introduces a model of employment determination that investigates the empirical increases in restaurant prices in response to minimum wage hikes.
- "The Effects of Health, Wealth, and Wages on Labor Supply and Retirement Behavior" (2005). French estimates a life cycle model of labour supply, retirement, and savings behaviour in which future health status and wages are uncertain.

French has also led an international collaboration of economists studying medical spending around the world. Some publications in this area include:

- "End-of-life medical spending in last twelve months of life is lower than previously reported" (2017). French collaborated with 27 other economists to measure the composition and magnitude of medical spending in the last three years before death.
- "Medicaid Insurance in Old Age" (2016), with Mariacristina De Nardi and John Jones. They estimate a structural model of savings and medical spending. They use it to compute the distribution of lifetime Medicaid transfers and Medicaid valuations across currently single retirees.
- "Medical Spending around the World: Summary of Results" (2016), with Elaine Kelley. The paper estimates the patterns of medical spending in nine countries – Canada, Denmark, England, France, Germany, Japan, the Netherlands, Taiwan and the United States.
- "Medical Spending on the U.S. Elderly" (2016), with Mariacristina De Nardi, John Jones and Jeremy McCauley. They use data from the Medicare Current Beneficiary Survey (MCBS) to document the medical spending of Americans aged 65 and older.
- "The Effects of Health Insurance and Self‐Insurance on Retirement Behavior" (2011), with John Jones. This paper provided an empirical analysis of the effects of employer‐provided health insurance, Medicare, and Social Security on retirement behaviour.
- "Why do the elderly save? The role of medical expenses" (2010), with Mariacristina De Nardi, and John Jones. They construct a model of saving for retired singles that includes a mix of different medical expenses and life expectancy.

== Personal life ==
Eric French lives in Cambridge, United Kingdom, with his wife Meredith Crowley and his three children.
