= Nemmers Prize in Earth Sciences =

Biennial award for Earth sciences

The Nemmers Prize in Earth Sciences is an award presented every two years by Northwestern University. It recognizes achievements and work of lasting significance in the field of Earth science.

It was established in 2016 as one of the awards endowed by the brothers Erwin and Frederic Nemmers. It was first awarded in 2018. Recipients receive a $300,000 cash prize and spend time on the Northwestern campus to present lectures, participate in department seminars and interact with faculty and students.

== Recipients ==
The following recipients have received this award:

- 2018: Francis Albarède, for his outstanding work in applying geochemistry to Earth sciences.
- 2020: Katherine Freeman, for her groundbreaking contributions to the field of compound-specific stable isotope geochemistry and its applications to Earth science.
- 2022: Emily Brodsky, for her cutting edge and transdisciplinary research on the physics of earthquake networks.
- 2024: Barbara Sherwood Lollar, for her revolutionary work on the intersection of the carbon cycle and the water cycle, which is groundbreaking for several areas of Earth and environmental science research.
- 2026: Maureen Raymo, for her pioneering development of hypotheses that explain climate change across Earth’s history and her educational leadership in the Earth system sciences.

== See also ==
- Nemmers prize
- List of awards considered the highest in a field
- List of earth science awards
