= Nemmers Prize =

Nemmers Prize may refer to:

- Nemmers Prize in Mathematics
- Nemmers Prize in Economics
- Nemmers Prize in Music Composition
- Nemmers Prize in Medical Science
- Nemmers Prize in Earth Sciences
