= Masao Ogaki =

Japanese economist (born 1958)

- Born: 1958 (age 67–68)

Academic background
- Education: Osaka University (B.A. 1982); Osaka University (M.A. 1984); University of Chicago (Ph.D. 1988)
- Doctoral advisor: Lars Peter Hansen

Academic work
- Discipline: Macroeconomics; International economics Econometrics; Behavioral economics Cultural economics
- Institutions: Keio University; Ohio State University; University of Rochester
- Website: Information at IDEAS / RePEc

Masao Ogaki (大垣 昌夫, Ōgaki Masao; born 1958) is a Japanese economist. He is a professor at Keio University.

== Career ==
He received a B.A. from Osaka University in 1982 and a Ph.D. from University of Chicago in 1988.

== Bibliography ==
=== Journal articles ===
- Ogaki, Masao (1990). "The Indirect and Direct Substitution Effects". American Economic Review. 80 (5): 1271–1275. JSTOR 2006778.
- Ogaki, Masao (1992). "Engel's Law and Cointegration". Journal of Political Economy. 100 (5): 1027–1046. doi:10.1086/261850. JSTOR 2138633. S2CID 154464180.
- Ogaki, Masao; Ostry, Jonathan D.; Reinhart, Carmen M. (1996). "Saving Behavior in Low- and Middle-Income Developing Countries: A Comparison" (PDF). International Monetary Fund Staff Papers. 43 (1): 38–71. doi:10.2307/3867352. JSTOR 3867352. S2CID 152382557.
- Atkeson, Andrew; Ogaki, Masao (1996). "Wealth-varying intertemporal elasticities of substitution: Evidence from panel and aggregate data". American Economic Review. 38 (3): 507–534. doi:10.1016/S0304-3932(96)01290-1.
- Ogaki, Masao; Park, Joon Y. (1997). "A cointegration approach to estimating preference parameters". Journal of Econometrics. 82 (1): 107–134. doi:10.1016/S0304-4076(97)00053-5.
- Ogaki, Masao; Reinhart, Carmen M. (1998). "Measuring Intertemporal Substitution: The Role of Durable Goods". Journal of Political Economy. 106 (5): 1078–1098. CiteSeerX 10.1.1.627.9573. doi:10.1086/250040. JSTOR 10.1086/250040. S2CID 55031289.
- Ogaki, Masao; Zhang, Qiang (2001). "Decreasing Relative Risk Aversion and Tests of Risk Sharing" (PDF). Econometrica. 69 (2): 515–526. doi:10.1111/1468-0262.00201. JSTOR 2692241.
- Mark, Nelson C.; Ogaki, Masao; Sul, Donggyu (2005). "Dynamic Seemingly Unrelated Cointegrating Regressions". Review of Economic Studies. 72 (3): 797–820. doi:10.1111/j.1467-937X.2005.00352.x. S2CID 13296218.
