= Francis Albarède =

French geochemist (born 1947)

Francis Albarède (born 1947) is a French geochemist. He is professor at the Ecole Normale Superieure de Lyon and a member of the Academia Europaea. In January 2011, he became the first director of the Laboratory of Geology Lyon (UMR5276).

== Biography ==
In 1960 Francis Albarède studied natural sciences at the University of Montpellier. He defended a graduate thesis in geochemistry (advised by Claude Allegre) at the Institut de Physique du Globe de Paris ("Paris Institute of Earth Physics"), where he remained several years as a teacher and researcher. In 1976 he defended a thesis on isotope state geochemistry, then spent two years in the U.S. (Caltech). In 1979 he was promoted to professor at the National School of Geology in Nancy, where he remained for 12 years. Finally, in 1991 he joined the Ecole Normale Superieure de Lyon where he now serves as the director of the department of earth and life sciences.

The scientific influence of Francis Albarède is very strong in the field of geochemistry and earth sciences in general. His leading position in his discipline was accompanied by the acquisition in the laboratory of the first commercial sample mass spectrometer multicollection plasma source in the mid-1990s, and the editorial responsibility of prestigious international scientific journals. In 1995 Francis Albarède authored a reference book, Introduction to Geochemical Modeling. He received the 2008 Goldschmidt Award of the Geochemical Society in Vancouver, in July 2008.

He is married to geochemist Janne Blichert-Toft.

== Distinctions ==
- Nemmers Prize in Earth Sciences (2018)
- V. M. Goldschmidt Award - Geochemical Society (2008)
- Knight of the Legion of Honour (2008)
- Knight of the Order of Academic Palms (2006)
- Arthur Holmes Medal (European Union of Geosciences) (2001)
- Norman Bowen Award (American Geophysical Union) (2000)
- Senior member of the Institut Universitaire de France (1994–2004)
- CNRS Silver Medal (1988)

== Works ==
- Geochemistry, Que sais-je? no. 75. University Press of France (1976)
- Introduction to Geochemical Modeling, Cambridge University Press, (1995)
- Geochemistry, Gordon and Breach (2001)
- Geochemistry: An Introduction, Cambridge University Press, (2003)

== See also ==
- SILVER Wiki
