= Jeffrey I. Gordon =

American biologist (born 1947)

- Born: October 4, 1947 (age 79); New Orleans, LA
- Education: Oberlin College; University of Chicago School of Medicine
- Known for: Characterizing role of human gut microbiome in health and disease
- Awards: Louisa Gross Horwitz Prize (2017); Copley Medal (2018); Balzan Prize (2021); Princess of Asturias Award (2023); Albany Medical Center Prize (2023)
- Scientific career
- Fields: Biomedical Science
- Workplaces: Washington University School of Medicine
- Website: gordonlab.washu.edu

Jeffrey I. Gordon is the Dr. Robert J. Glaser Distinguished University Professor and Director of The Edison Family Center for Genome Sciences & Systems Biology at Washington University School of Medicine. He is considered to be the "father" of human microbiome research. His studies of healthy and undernourished children living in low- and middle-income countries have yielded insights about how the gut microbiome develops in the first several years after birth, and evidence that disrupted gut microbiome development is a contributing cause of childhood undernutrition.

Gordon and his group's work has advanced scientific understanding of the human gut microbiome as a microbial "organ" that affects human health and disease beyond gastrointestinal health. Their work has entailed developing experimental and computational approaches for dissecting the vast complexity and dynamism of the gut microbiome to identify microbial effectors of postnatal growth, discovering food formulations and their bioactive molecules that repair undernourished children’s gut microbiomes, and characterizing how microbiome repair in these children has effects that extend beyond the walls of the gut to influence regulators of muscle, bone, and brain development plus immune and metabolic functions. Overall, this work illustrates the importance of understanding that human health reflects an integration of activities of our human and microbial cells and genes.

Much of Gordon's work has focused on addressing the global health challenge of childhood undernutrition. Central questions that Gordon and his lab are pursuing include how our gut microbial communities influence human health, what interventions will repair microbial communities for an individual or a population to optimize healthy development, and how to create local infrastructures to deliver treatment in affordable, culturally acceptable, appetizing foods. He and his team identified underdeveloped gut microbiota as a contributing cause of childhood malnutrition and found that therapeutic food aimed at repairing the gut microbiome is more effective than a widely used standard therapeutic food to treat childhood malnutrition. Unlike standard therapeutic foods, these microbiome-directed foods improve long-term effects of malnutrition, including problems with metabolism, bone growth, immune function and brain development.

== Education and career ==
Gordon was born in New Orleans, Louisiana, and grew up in Connecticut. He earned his Bachelor of Arts from Oberlin College (1969) and his Doctor of Medicine from the University of Chicago (1973). After receiving his MD, Gordon completed his clinical training in internal medicine and gastroenterology at Washington University School of Medicine and was a post-doctoral fellow in the Laboratory of Biochemistry at the National Cancer Institute, part of the National Institutes of Health (NIH). He then joined the faculty at Washington University, where he has spent his entire academic career. Gordon was first a member of the Departments of Medicine and of Biological Chemistry (1981-1990), then served as Head of the Department of Molecular Biology and Pharmacology (1991-2003). Currently his primary faculty appointment is in the Department of Pathology and Immunology. Since 2004, Gordon has served as the founding director of The Edison Family Center for Genome Sciences & Systems Biology.

== Early scientific research ==
Gordon's early work focused on how the gastrointestinal epithelium is continuously renewed throughout life, and how its component cell types express different functions as they differentiate depending upon where they are located along the length of the gut. This early work employed transgenic mice to study regulation of developmental-stage specific, cell type-specific and spatial patterns of gene expression using members of the fatty acid binding protein gene family as models.

During this time he also played a pivotal role in the study of protein N-myristoylation, a process by which the 14 carbon fatty acid, myristate, is covalently attached to an N-terminal glycine residue of proteins involved in cell signaling and other functions. Gordon's group was instrumental in characterizing the substrate specificity of N-myristoyltransferase (Nmt), its catalytic mechanism and its atomic structure. His genetic and biochemical studies provided evidence that Nmt is essential for the viability of fungi that are opportunistic pathogens and yielded enzyme inhibitors that functioned as anti-fungal agents.

The Gordon lab's transgenic and genetic mosaic mouse models provided evidence that spatial patterns of gene expression in gut epithelial cell lineages were dependent in part on cues from the environment. In the early 1990s, he turned to the gut's community of micro-organisms (microbiota) and their collective genes (microbiome) to search for these cues. In a simplified model of the human gut ecosystem that employed germ-free mice colonized with a single prominent human gut bacterial symbiont (Bacteroides thetaiotaomicron), his lab showed that this bacterium could direct a postnatal developmental program of expanding production of fucose-containing polysaccharides in the small intestinal epithelium but only if the organisms had functional genes for utilizing these host polysaccharides. His follow-up functional genomics study of gnotobiotic mice colonized with just B. thetaioatomicron disclosed how a gut symbiont could influence many other aspects of gut biology. By sequencing the B. thetaiotaomicron genome, they found a repertoire of genes encoding enzymes that degrade polysaccharides; the number and type of these enzymes greatly exceeded those encoded in the human genome. This information enabled them to show in gnotobiotic mice how this organism can adaptively forage dietary and host glycans depending upon the diets they consumed. B. thetaiotaomicron has subsequently become a leading model organism for dissecting the genetic and metabolic underpinnings of the symbiotic relationship between members of the gut microbiota and their human hosts – including how members sense/acquire/metabolize dietary polysaccharides.

These findings led his group to colonize germ-free animals with defined microbial communities of increasing complexity composed of cultured, genome-sequenced human gut microbiota members, so that questions about how members cooperate and compete in different nutrient environments to shape host physiology could be addressed. Encouraged by results obtained from these types of models, Gordon was lead author of an influential 2005 National Human Genome Research Institute white-paper entitled "Extending Our View of Self: the Human Gut Microbiome Initiative (HGMI)". In 2007, the Human Microbiome Project was listed on the NIH Roadmap for Medical Research as one of the New Pathways to Discovery.

Gordon's efforts to link gut microbiome function to nutritional status initially focused on obesity and its associated metabolic dysfunction. This work involved characterization and subsequent transplantation of gut microbial communities from obese and lean mice, and later obese and lean twins including twin pairs discordant for obesity, into germ-free mice to characterize the effects of diet components on microbial community function and host physiology and metabolism. These preclinical models and subsequent pilot clinical studies have been used to develop microbiome-targeted snack food prototypes composed of combinations of polysaccharides from sustainable sources that could improve microbiome function.

== Current research ==
Gordon and his team are characterizing the role of the gut microbiome in childhood undernutrition (wasting, stunting or a combination of the two), testing the hypothesis that healthy growth of infants and children depends in part on coordinated co-development of the gut microbiome and host organ systems. Gordon's work indicates that the healthy development of microbial communities in the gut during infancy is correlated with a child's healthy growth and development overall.

Birth cohort studies performed by Gordon and collaborators, primarily in Bangladesh in collaboration with Tahmeed Ahmeed at the International Centre for Diarrhoeal Disease Research, Bangladesh (iccdr,b), as well as studies of Malawian twins showing significant difference (discordance) for undernutrition, identified that a normal program of postnatal gut microbiota development in healthy individuals is disrupted in undernourished children. Their research further showed that the disrupted microbial communities of undernourished children are not repaired with current nutritional interventions. By transplanting microbiota from healthy and undernourished children into germ-free mice fed diets of the human microbiota donors, Gordon's lab identified bacterial strains associated with key facets of postnatal growth and development. These strains become therapeutic targets for repairing the microbial communities of undernourished children.

To develop affordable and scalable treatments, Gordon and his group used gnotobiotic mice and piglets to screen combinations of foods given to 12-18-month-old Bangladeshi children. The microbial communities of the test animals were colonized with gut microbial organisms from undernourished Bangladeshi children. This effort yielded microbiota-directed food (MDCFs) prototypes that modulated the fitness and expressed metabolic activities of targeted age-and growth-discriminatory bacterial strains. Randomized controlled clinical trials performed in Bangladeshi children with wasting showed that compared to a commonly used therapeutic food (ready-to-use supplementary food), the microbiota-directed food produced significantly greater growth, even though its caloric density was lower than that of the traditional therapeutic food. Additionally, this superior growth response was accompanied by superior microbiota repair and alterations in levels of plasma protein biomarkers and mediators of musculoskeletal development, neurodevelopment, metabolism, and immune function. Gordon's team has also identified the bioactive components of the microbiota-directed food, their microbial therapeutic targets, and how these microbial targets can produce novel metabolic effectors of host physiology.

Together with studies of Bangladeshi infants with severe wasting and of the small intestinal microbiota of stunted Bangladeshi children, this work has revealed a causal link between gut microbiome development in the first years of life, and healthy growth and development in children. "When a child's gut microbiome is underdeveloped, their overall growth can stagnate, leading to malnutrition with further detrimental effects on immunity, metabolism, bone growth and brain development," Gordon has said. He has further said there is a critical window in early childhood when interventions with beneficial foods could help shape the development of the gut microbiome in a way that promotes healthy growth overall. Gordon and his team's work also has yielded a generally applicable translational medicine pipeline for establishing whether disruptions in microbiome composition and expressed functions are related to disease states, and for linking the molecular components of food and microbiome function to human health.

== Honors ==
Gordon is a member of the National Academy of Sciences, the American Academy of Arts & Sciences, the National Academy of Medicine, and the American Philosophical Society. He is the recipient of a number of awards including:

- 2013 Selman A. Waksman Award in Microbiology, National Academy of Sciences
- 2013 Robert Koch Award, Koch Foundation
- 2014 Passano Award, Passano Foundation
- 2014 Dickson Prize in Medicine, University of Pittsburgh
- 2015 King Faisal International Prize in Medicine, King Faisal Foundation
- 2015 Keio Medical Science Prize, Keio University
- 2017 Massry Prize, Meira and Shaul G. Massry Foundation
- 2017 Sanofi-Institut Pasteur International Award for Biomedical Research, Sanofi; Institut Pasteur
- 2017 Louisa Gross Horwitz Prize, Columbia University
- 2018 Copley Medal, Royal Society
- 2018 BBVA Foundation Frontiers of Knowledge Award in Biology and Biomedicine, BBVA Foundation
- 2021 Balzan Prize for Microbiome in Health and Disease, International Balzan Foundation
- 2021 George M. Kober Medal, Association of American Physicians
- 2022 David and Beatrix Hamburg Award for Advances in Biomedical Research and Clinical Medicine, National Academy of Medicine
- 2022 Dr. Paul Janssen Award for Biomedical Research, Johnson & Johnson
- 2023 Princess of Asturias Award for Technical and Scientific Research, The Princess of Asturias Foundation
- 2023 Albany Medical Center Prize in Medicine and Biomedical Research, Albany Med Health System
- 2024 Mechthild Esser Nemmers Prize in Medical Science, Northwestern University
- 2024 Nierenberg Prize for Science in the Public Interest, Scripps Institution of Oceanography - University of California, San Diego

Gordon has received honorary doctorates from the University of Gothenburg (2011), the University of Chicago (2014), and Norwegian University of Life Sciences (2024).
