= Rational inattention =

In economics, the theory of rational inattention deals with the effects of the cost of information acquisition on decision making. For example, when the information required for a decision is costly to acquire, the decision makers may rationally take decisions based on incomplete information, rather than incurring the cost to get the complete information.

== See also ==
- Behavioral economics
- Christopher Sims
- Rationality
- Value of information
- Rational ignorance
