= Erwin Plein Nemmers Prize in Economics =

Biennial economics award

The Erwin Plein Nemmers Prize in Economics is an academic prize awarded biennially by Northwestern University. It was initially endowed along with a companion prize, the Frederic Esser Nemmers Prize in Mathematics. Both are part a $14 million donation from the Nemmers brothers, who envisioned creating an award that would be as prestigious as the Nobel prize. 11 out of the past 17 Nemmers economics prize winners have gone on to win a Nobel Prize: Peter Diamond, Thomas J. Sargent, Robert Aumann, Daniel McFadden, Edward C. Prescott, Lars Peter Hansen, Jean Tirole, Paul R. Milgrom, Claudia Goldin, Daron Acemoglu, and Michael Woodford. Those who already have won a Nobel Prize are ineligible to receive a Nemmers prize. The Nemmers prizes are given in recognition of major contributions to new knowledge or the development of significant new modes of analysis in the respective disciplines. As of 2023, the prize carries a $300,000 stipend, among the largest monetary awards in the United States for outstanding achievements in economics.

== Awardees ==
- 2026: Whitney Newey, "in recognition of a body of work that has shaped the field of semiparametric econometrics, guided both econometricians and empirical researchers over several decades, and helped lay the foundations for modern machine learning-based inference."
- 2024: Michael Woodford, "for advancing the New Keynesian approach to understanding economic fluctuations in general equilibrium, bridging the theory and the practice of monetary policy, and incorporating bounded rationality in macroeconomics." (Nobel 2026)
- 2022: Ariel Pakes, "for his fundamental contributions to the development of the field of empirical industrial organization."
- 2020: Claudia Goldin, "for her groundbreaking insights into the history of the American economy, the evolution of gender roles and the interplay of technology, human capital and labor markets." (Nobel 2023)
- 2018: David Kreps, "for his work in game theory, decision theory and finance."
- 2016: Richard Blundell, "for his important contributions to labor economics, public finance and applied econometrics."
- 2014: Jean Tirole, "based on his various contributions to economic theory and its application to finance, industrial organization and behavioral economics." (Nobel 2014)
- 2012: Daron Acemoglu (Nobel 2024)
- 2010: Elhanan Helpman
- 2008: Paul R. Milgrom (Nobel 2020)
- 2006: Lars Peter Hansen (Nobel 2013)
- 2004: Ariel Rubinstein
- 2002: Edward C. Prescott (Nobel 2004)
- 2000: Daniel McFadden (Nobel 2000)
- 1998: Robert Aumann (Nobel 2005)
- 1996: Thomas J. Sargent (Nobel 2011)
- 1994: Peter Diamond (Nobel 2010)

== See also ==
- Nemmers prize
- List of economics awards
- List of awards considered the highest in a field
