= Christopher A. Sims =

American econometrician and macroeconomist (1942–2026)

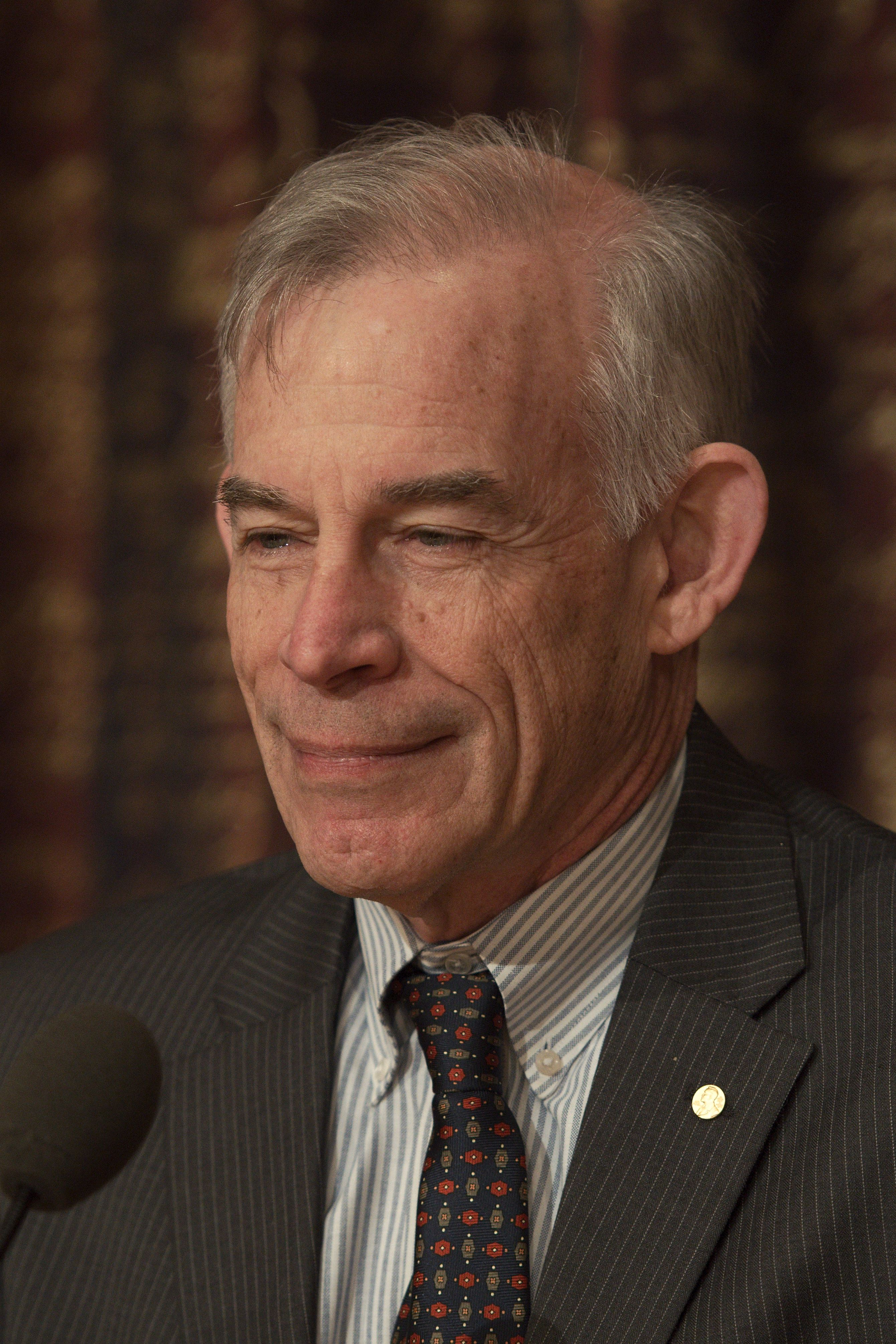
- Sims in 2011
- Born: Christopher Albert Sims; October 21, 1942; Washington, D.C., U.S.
- Died: March 14, 2026 (aged 83); Minneapolis, Minnesota, U.S.

Academic background
- Education: Harvard University (AB, PhD)
- Thesis: The dynamics of productivity change: a theoretical and empirical study (1968)
- Doctoral advisor: Hendrik S. Houthakker

Academic work
- Discipline: Macroeconomics; Econometrics; Time series
- Institutions: Princeton University; Yale University; University of Minnesota; Harvard University
- Doctoral students: Lars Peter Hansen; Harald Uhlig
- Notable ideas: Use of vector autoregression
- Awards: Nobel Memorial Prize in Economic Sciences (2011)
- Website: Information at IDEAS / RePEc

Christopher Albert Sims (October 21, 1942 – March 14, 2026) was an American econometrician and macroeconomist. He was the John J.F. Sherrerd '52 University Professor of Economics at Princeton University. Together with Thomas Sargent, he won the Nobel Memorial Prize in Economic Sciences in 2011. The award cited their "empirical research on cause and effect in the macroeconomy".

== Background ==
Sims was born in Washington, D.C., the son of Ruth Bodman (Leiserson), a Democratic politician and daughter of William Morris Leiserson, and Albert Sims, a state department worker. His father was of English and Northern Irish descent, and his mother was of half Estonian Jewish and half English ancestry. His uncle was Yale economist Mark Leiserson. Sims earned his A.B. in mathematics from Harvard University magna cum laude in 1963 and his PhD in economics from Harvard in 1968 under supervision of Hendrik S. Houthakker. During the 1963–64 academic year, he was a graduate student at the University of California, Berkeley. He served as a faculty member in the department of economics at the University of Minnesota for 20 years (1970–90). He also held teaching positions at Harvard, Yale University, and, from 1999, Princeton where he spent the longest portion of his career. Sims was a Fellow of the Econometric Society (from 1974), a member of the American Academy of Arts and Sciences (from 1988), a member of the National Academy of Sciences (from 1989), and a member of the American Philosophical Society (from 2012). In 1995, he was president of the Econometric Society; in 2012, he was president of the American Economic Association.

Sims died from injuries sustained in a fall at his home in Minneapolis, Minnesota, on March 14, 2026, at the age of 83.

== Contributions and views ==
Sims published numerous important papers in his areas of research: econometrics and macroeconomic theory and policy. Among other things, he was one of the main promoters of the use of vector autoregression in empirical macroeconomics. However, some of the maintained assumptions in such models have been incorrectly tested (Sims, 1980) using asymptotic distribution theory since it is infeasible to test over 200 restrictions on model parameters using only 60 observations on time series (Sargan, 1961). He also advocated Bayesian statistics, arguing for its power in formulating and evaluating economic policies.

He was an outspoken opponent of the rational expectations revolution in macroeconomics, arguing that it should be thought of as a "cautionary footnote" to econometric policy analysis, rather than "a deep objection to its foundations." He was similarly skeptical of the value of real business cycle models.

Sims also helped develop the fiscal theory of the price level and the theory of rational inattention.

In June 2024, 16 Nobel Prize in Economics laureates, including Sims, signed an open letter arguing that Donald Trump’s fiscal and trade policies coupled with efforts to limit the Federal Reserve's independence would reignite inflation in the United States.

== Nobel Memorial Prize and lecture ==
On October 10, 2011, Sims and Thomas J. Sargent were awarded the Nobel Memorial Prize in Economic Sciences. The award cited their "empirical research on cause and effect in the macroeconomy". His Nobel lecture, titled "Statistical Modeling of Monetary Policy and its Effects" was delivered on December 8, 2011.

Translating his work into everyday language, Sims said it provided a technique to assess the direction of causality in central bank monetary policy. It confirmed the theories of monetarists like Milton Friedman that shifts in the money supply affect inflation. However, it also showed that causality went both ways. Variables like interest rates and inflation also led to changes in the money supply.

Awards
Preceded by Peter A. Diamond; Dale T. Mortensen; Christopher A. Pissarides	Laureate of the Nobel Memorial Prize in Economics; 2011; Served alongside: Thomas J. Sargent	Succeeded by Alvin E. Roth; Lloyd S. Shapley
Academic offices
Preceded by Orley Ashenfelter	President of the American Economic Association; 2012– 2013	Succeeded by Claudia Goldin
