= Nemmers Prize in Medical Science =

Science award

The Mechthild Esser Nemmers Prize in Medical Science, established in 2016, is awarded every other year by the Feinberg School of Medicine. The recipient is "a physician-scientist whose body of research exhibits outstanding achievement in their discipline as demonstrated by works of lasting significance". The winner is determined by a jury of biomedical scientists and receives $350,000. The award is one of five Nemmers Prizes awarded by the University, created as a gift to Northwestern by the late brothers Erwin Esser Nemmers and Frederic Esser Nemmers.

== Awardees ==
The following recipients have received this award:

- 2016: Huda Zoghbi, MD
- 2018: Stuart Orkin, MD
- 2020: Not awarded
- 2022: Jeremy Nathans, MD, PhD
- 2024: Jeffrey I. Gordon
- 2026: Jean-Laurent Casanova

== See also ==
- List of medicine awards
