= Jeremy Nathans =

American geneticist

- Born: July 31, 1958 (age 68); New York City
- Education: MIT (B.S.), Stanford University (Ph.D.)
- Awards: Newcomb Cleveland Prize (1986); Golden Brain Award (1989); Benjamin Franklin Medal (Franklin Institute) (2020); Nemmers Prize in Medical Science (2022)
- Scientific career
- Fields: genetics, molecular biology, neuroscience
- Workplaces: Johns Hopkins University
- Doctoral advisor: David Hogness

Jeremy Nathans (born July 31, 1958) is a professor of molecular biology and genetics at Johns Hopkins University. He is also a member of the National Academy of Sciences and an investigator of the Howard Hughes Medical Institute.

He is known for first isolating and characterizing the opsin genes contributing to human color vision. In 2020 he was awarded the Benjamin Franklin Medal (Franklin Institute) in Life Science. In 2022 he was awarded the Nemmers Prize in Medical Science.
