= Hendrik S. Houthakker =

American economist (1924–2008)

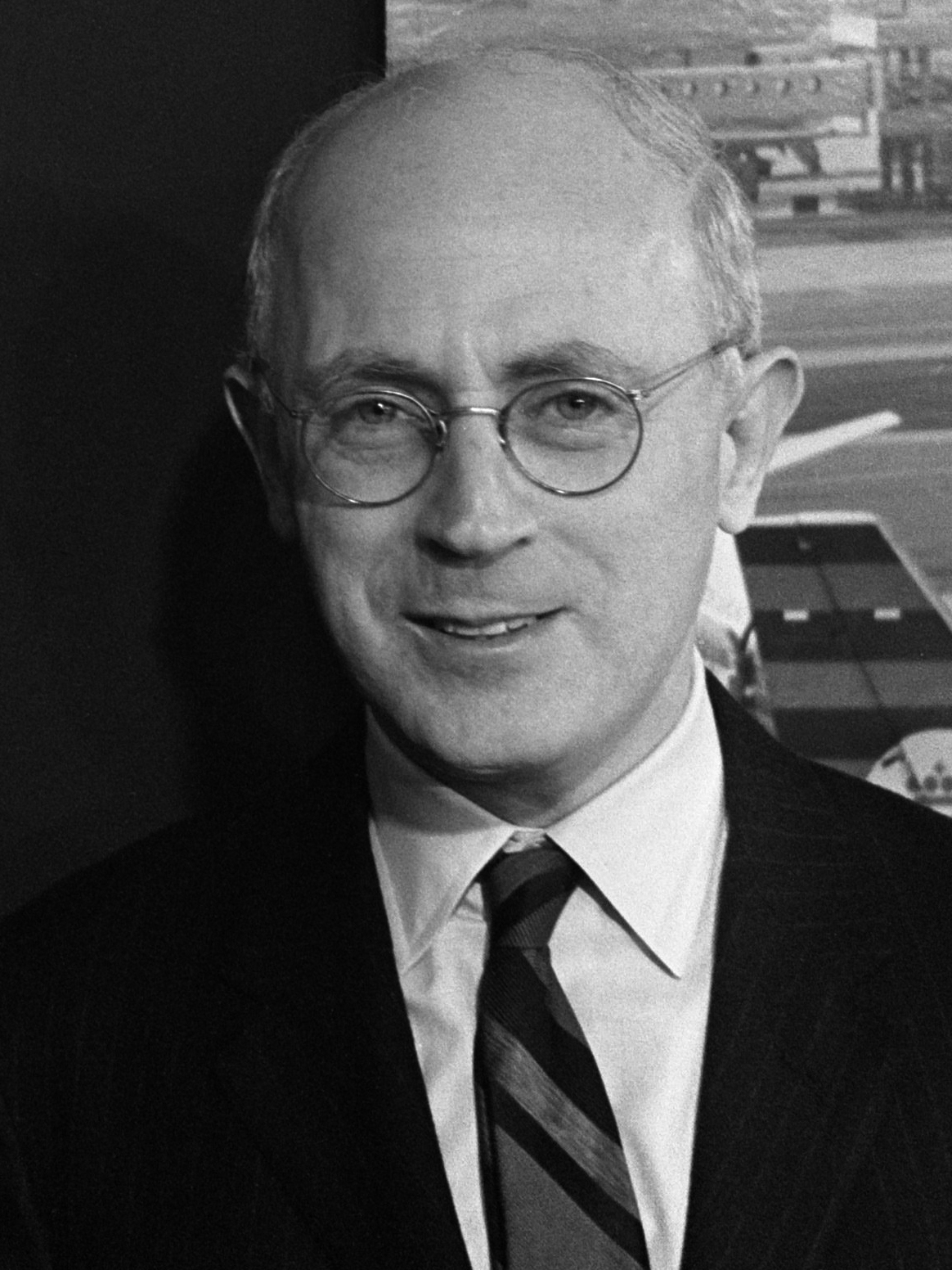
- Hendrik S Houthakker (1969)
- Born: December 31, 1924; Amsterdam, Netherlands
- Died: April 15, 2008 (aged 83); Lebanon, New Hampshire, U.S.

Academic background
- Education: University of Amsterdam
- Influences: Richard Stone

Academic work
- Discipline: Behavioral economics Econometrics
- Institutions: Harvard University; Stanford University
- Doctoral students: Christopher A. Sims; Elhanan Helpman

Hendrik Samuel Houthakker (December 31, 1924 – April 15, 2008) was a Dutch-American economist.

== Life and career ==
Houthakker was born in Amsterdam to a Dutch-Jewish family. His father was a prominent art dealer. As a teenager he lived through the Nazi occupation of the Netherlands and, according to an interview he gave to the Valley News, was once arrested by the Gestapo but escaped and was sheltered for some months by a Roman Catholic family. He completed his graduate work at the University of Amsterdam in 1949. He taught at Stanford University from 1954 to 1960 and then completed the rest of his career at Harvard University. In 1961 he was elected as a Fellow of the American Statistical Association. Houthakker served on President Nixon's Council of Economic Advisers from 1969 to 1971, where he advocated replacing the International Monetary Fund's pegged exchange rate system with a flexible peg.

Houthakker's contributions to economic theory have been summarized by Pollak (1990). He is particularly well known for the Strong Axiom of Revealed Preference, to which his name is often attached. This paper reconciles Paul Samuelson's revealed preference approach to demand theory with the earlier ordinal utility approach of Eugene Slutsky and Sir John Hicks, by showing that demand functions satisfy his Strong Axiom if and only if they can be generated by maximising a set of preferences that are "well-behaved" in the sense that they satisfy the axioms of choice theory, that is, they are reflexive, transitive, complete, monotonic, convex and continuous—essentially the conditions required for a Hicksian approach to demand theory.

Houthakker's wife, Anna-Teresa Tymieniecka, was a Polish-born philosopher and founder of the World Phenomenology Institute; they were married for 52 years, up to his death. Through her he became friendly with Karol Wojtyła, subsequently Pope John Paul II.

Barack Obama Sr. (Barack Obama's father) worked as a research assistant for Houthakker over the summer in 1963 at Harvard.

== Selected bibliography ==
- Houthakker, Hendrik S. (1959), "The scope and limits of futures trading", in Abramovitz, Moses; et al. (eds.), The allocation of economic resources: essays in honor of Bernard Francis Haley, Stanford, California: Stanford University Press, OCLC 490147128.
