= Albert Marcet =

Spanish economist

Albert Marcet Torrens
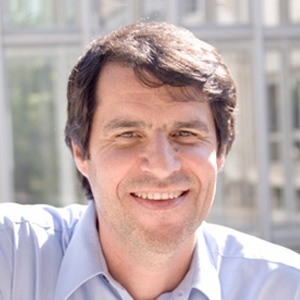
- Born: April 11, 1960 (age 66); Spain

Academic background
- Education: Universitat Autonoma de Barcelona; University of Minnesota
- Influences: Thomas Sargent

Academic work
- Discipline: Monetary economics
- Institutions: Center for Research in International Economics; Universitat Pompeu Fabra; Barcelona School of Economics
- Notable ideas: Learning; Recursive contracts
- Website: Information at IDEAS / RePEc

Albert Marcet Torrens (born 11 April 1960) is a Spanish economist, specialized in macroeconomics, time series, financial economics and economic dynamic theory. He is an ICREA Research Professor at the Center for Research in International Economics (CREI), and Research Professor at the Barcelona School of Economics (BSE), where he is also AXA Research Chair on Macroeconomic Risk, and Adjunct Professor at Universitat Pompeu Fabra (UPF). Marcet is also a Fellow of the Econometric Society and he has been a Research Fellow of Centre for Economic Policy Research (CEPR) since 1992.

== Career ==
Albert Marcet holds a degree in Economics from Universitat Autònoma de Barcelona and a PhD in Economics from University of Minnesota.

In the past, he has been a professor of Economics at the London School of Economics and ICREA Research Professor and Director of the Institute for Economic Analysis (IAE), a research center of the Spanish National Research Council (CSIC).

He has also served as President of the Spanish Economic Association (2007). In 2013, he received an Advanced Grant from the European Research Council (ERC) for his project, Asset Prices and Macro Policy when Agents Learn. Professor Marcet was the first Director of the Barcelona School of Economics Master in Macroeconomic Policy and Financial Markets. He now serves as its Scientific Director and teaches courses in the program.

He has worked extensively in the field of agents' expectations modeling, working with Thomas Sargent and Juan Pablo Nicolini.

== Awards ==
- European Research Council Advanced Grants, 2012 and 2017
- King James I Awards in Economy, 2016
- Wim Duisenberg Fellowship, European Central Bank, 2006
