= Barbara Sherwood Lollar =

Canadian geologist and academic (born 1963)

Barbara Sherwood Lollar CC FRSC FRS
- Born: Barbara Sherwood; February 19, 1963 (age 63); Kingston, Ontario, Canada
- Education: Harvard University; University of Waterloo
- Known for: Stable isotopic analysis of ground water and subsurface microbiology
- Awards: ENI award, Nemmers Prize in Earth Sciences, Wollaston Medal, Gerhard Herzberg Canada Gold Medal for Science and Engineering
- Scientific career
- Fields: Stable isotope geochemistry, Hydrogeology
- Workplaces: University of Toronto
- Thesis: Origins and implications of methane in the crystalline environment: The Canadian and Fennoscandian shields (1990)
- Website: www.es.utoronto.ca/people/faculty/sherwood-lollar-barbara

Barbara Sherwood Lollar, CC FRSC FRS (born February 19, 1963) is a Canadian geologist and academic known for her research into billion-year-old water and discoveries on the interface of the carbon cycle and hydrogeology, including the origin and fate H2, He, CO2, and CH4, deep subsurface microbiology, and the remediation of surface drinking water supplies. She is currently a University Professor in the Department of Earth Sciences at the University of Toronto. In 2007, she was made a Canada Research Chair in Isotope Geochemistry of the Earth and the Environment. It was renewed in 2014. In 2018 she was appointed the Dr. Norman Keevil Chair at the University of Toronto, and Science Chair at Massey College

== Early life and education ==
Sherwood Lollar was born in Kingston, Ontario, the daughter of John M Sherwood and Joan Sherwood, historians and academics at Queen's University, Kingston, she joined the University of Toronto in 1992 after receiving a Bachelor of Arts degree in Geological Sciences from Harvard University, a Ph.D. in Earth Sciences from University of Waterloo in 1990, and a postdoctoral fellow at University of Cambridge.

== Career ==
She has published over 240 peer-reviewed papers in geochemistry, Earth and planetary sciences and supervised over 125 students, postdoctoral fellows and research associates around the world.

She is co-director of the Canadian Institute for Advanced Research (CIFAR) "Earth 4D - Subsurface Science and Exploration" research program, a multi-million dollar project integrating international researchers to target questions related to understanding water resources and sustainability, the link between global resources, climate change and the green energy transition, subsurface gases/fluids and subsurface life, planetary habitability, and the implications for planetary geosciences and exploration. She has frequently collaborated with Tullis Onstott and Lisa Pratt on large multi-national research projects.

== Honours ==
In 2004, she was made a Fellow of Royal Society of Canada. In 2010, she was made a Senior Fellow of Massey College. In 2012, she was awarded the ENI award. In 2015, she was made a Fellow of the American Geophysical Union. In 2016, she was awarded the Natural Sciences and Engineering Research Council's John C. Polanyi Award. In 2016, she was invested as a Companion of the Order of Canada "for her revolutionary contributions to geochemistry, notably in the development of innovative mechanisms for groundwater remediation, and for her discovery of ancient fluids that hold implications for life on other planets". Also in 2016, she was awarded the Bancroft Award by the Royal Society of Canada. She received the Logan Medal in 2018.

She was elected a fellow of the Royal Society in 2019. In 2021, she was elected a member of the National Academy of Engineering for contributions to understanding of the evolution of Earth's groundwater and atmosphere. In 2022 she was elected to the National Academy of Sciences as an International Fellow.

On 6 May 2019, Sherwood Lollar received the Gerhard Herzberg Canada Gold Medal for Science and Engineering from the Natural Sciences and Engineering Research Council of Canada.

She received the 2024 Nemmers Prize in Earth science for her "groundbreaking discoveries across several fields of Earth and environmental sciences, illuminating fundamental aspects of Earth's life-sustaining water and carbon cycles". She received the 2025 Wollaston Medal by the Geological Society of London. In 2024 a novel subsurface chemilithotrophic genus Sherwoodlollariibacterium and species Sherwoodlollariibacterium unditelluris ("of the water from the earth") were named in honour of Sherwood Lollar's contributions to subsurface science and microbiology.

=== Other honours ===
- NASA Agency Group Achievement Award (2025)
- Geological Society of London Wollaston Medal (2025)
- Nemmers Prize in Earth Sciences (2024)
- Visiting Lecturer Cambridge University Leverhulme Centre for Life in the Universe (2024)
- American Geophysical Union Carl Sagan Lecturer (2023)
- United States National Academy of Sciences (NAS) International Fellow (2022)
- United States National Academy of Engineering (NAE) International Fellow (2021)
- Royal Canadian Geographic Society Massey Medal (2021)
- Canada Council for the Arts - Killam Prize for Natural Sciences (2020)
- Royal Society of Canada Willet G. Miller Medal in Earth Sciences (2020)
- NSERC Gerhard Herzberg Gold Medal (2019)
- Fellow of the Royal Society London (2019)
- C.C. Patterson Award in Environmental Geochemistry (2019)
- Fellow of the Royal Canadian Geographical Society (2019)
- Fellow of the Geochemical Society and the European Association of Geochemistry (2019)
- Advisory Council to the Governor-General for the Order of Canada (2018–2021)
- Geological Association of Canada Logan Medal (2018)
- Appointed Companion of the Order of Canada (2016)
- NSERC John C. Polanyi Award (2016)
- Royal Society of Canada Bancroft Medal (2016)
- Fellow, American Geophysical Union (2015)
- President of the Geochemical Society (2014–2015)
- Helmholtz International Fellow Award for research excellence (2014)
- Eni Award in Protection of the Environment (2012)
- Geological Society of America Geobiology and Geomicrobiology Division Award (2012)
- NSERC E.W.R. Steacie Fellowship University of Toronto (1999–2001)
- Henry Darcy Distinguished Lecturer U.S. National Groundwater Association (1998)
- Governor-General's gold medal for PhD University of Waterloo (1990–1991)
- W.B. Pearson Medal in Earth Sciences for PhD University of Waterloo (1990–1991)
