= List of awards considered the highest in a field =

This is a list of awards that are considered the highest in a field of science, business, humanities, art, religion, or sports.

== Prizes sponsored by the Nobel Foundation ==
Alfred Nobel's last will of 1895 only included five prizes, covering outstanding achievements who confer the "greatest benefit on mankind" in the fields of chemistry, physics, literature, peace, and physiology or medicine. The original Nobel prizes to be administered by the Nobel Foundation thus include:

- Nobel Prize in Chemistry
- Nobel Prize in Physics
- Nobel Prize in Literature
- Nobel Peace Prize
- Nobel Prize in Physiology or Medicine

The foundation also sponsors the Nobel Memorial Prize in Economic Sciences.

== Other prestigious awards and prizes (not related to the Nobel Foundation) ==
The term "Nobel Prize" is trademarked so this designation cannot be legally used to refer to any prizes other than those conferred by the Nobel Foundation. Notwithstanding, there are many prizes in fields of study and achievement not covered by the original Nobel Prizes. Some have been referred to as the "Nobel Prize of" that particular field, in the vast majority of cases without the approval of the Nobel Foundation. These prizes are generally considered the highest awards in their fields (or a subset thereof), and have usually been established by various authorities or entities that claim a high degree of expertise. For some fields, more than one prize is listed below (inception shown in brackets):

=== Mathematical sciences ===
==== Applied mathematics ====
- John von Neumann Lecture Prize (1960)
- Carl Friedrich Gauss Prize (2006)^{1}
- George David Birkhoff Prize (1968)^{2}
- Norbert Wiener Prize (1970)^{2}
- 1: The Gauss Prize is awarded every four years to one mathematician on the occasion of the International Congress of Mathematicians (ICM). It was awarded for the first time at the 2006 ICM, and so far only few mathematicians have received the medal.
- 2: The Birkhoff Prize and the Wiener Prize are both awarded jointly by the American Mathematical Society (AMS) and the Society for Industrial and Applied Mathematics (SIAM). The recipient must be a member of one of the two societies. In 1967, these two prizes were established at the same time. The initial contribution for the Birkhoff Prize came from the Birkhoff family and for the Wiener Prize from the Mathematics Department of the Massachusetts Institute of Technology. Each is to be awarded, every three years (initially every five years, which is why the two prizes were first awarded in 1968 and in 1970 respectively), for outstanding contributions to applied mathematics in the highest and broadest sense. In the early years, the Birkhoff Prize was awarded at an AMS meeting and the Wiener Prize at a SIAM meeting. Now they are usually awarded at joint mathematics meetings.

See also ICIAM Prizes (1999), William Benter Prize in Applied Mathematics (2010).

==== Mathematics ====
- Abel Prize (2003)
- Chern Medal (2010)^{1}
- Fields Medal (1936)^{2}
- Wolf Prize in Mathematics (1978)^{3}
- 1: The Chern Medal is awarded every four years to one mathematician on the occasion of the ICM. It was awarded for the first time at the 2010 ICM, and so far only few mathematicians have received the medal.
- 2: The Fields Medal is awarded every four years to two, three, or four mathematicians under 40 years of age on the occasion of the International Congress of Mathematicians (ICM).
- 3: The Wolf Prize was considered an equivalent of the Nobel Prize for mathematics until the Abel Prize was established.

See also Salem Prize (1968),Crafoord Prize in Mathematics (1982), Maryam Mirzakhani Prize in Mathematics (1988), Leroy P. Steele Prize (1993), Clay Research Award (1999), Shaw Prize in Mathematical Sciences (2004), Rolf Schock Prizes in Mathematics (1993),Breakthrough Prize in Mathematics (2013).

==== Statistics ====
- Rousseeuw Prize for Statistics (2022)
- International Prize in Statistics (2017)
- COPSS Presidents' Award (1981)^{1}
- 1: The COPSS Presidents' Award is awarded annually to a statistician who is either under 41 years of age, or under 46 years of age and has received a terminal statistics-related degree within 12 years.

=== Engineering ===
==== Electrical engineering ====
- IEEE Medal of Honor (1917)
- Faraday Medal (1922)
- Edison Medal (1909)
See also IEEE Daniel E. Noble Award (previously named the Morris N. Liebmann Award, 1919), IET Achievement Medals (1987), IEEE/RSE James Clerk Maxwell Medal (2007).

==== Engineering ====
- Charles Stark Draper Prize (1989)
- John Fritz Medal (1902)
- Queen Elizabeth Prize for Engineering (2013)

==== Mechanical engineering ====
- ASME Medal (1921)
- Timoshenko Medal (1957)
- James Watt International Gold Medal (1937)

=== Technology ===
==== Automation/control/cybernetics ====
- IEEE Control Systems Award (1982)
- Giorgio Quazza Medal (1981)
- Hendrik W. Bode Lecture Prize (1989)
- Richard E. Bellman Control Heritage Award (1979)
See also Rufus Oldenburger Medal (1968), IEEE Simon Ramo Medal (1984).

==== Communications ====
- Marconi Prize (1975)
- IEEE Alexander Graham Bell Medal (1976)
- See also IEEE Communications Society Edwin Howard Armstrong Achievement Award (1958), IEEE Eric E. Sumner Award (1997).
- For communication networks, see also IEEE Koji Kobayashi Computers and Communications Award (1988), SIGCOMM Award (1989), SIGMOBILE Outstanding Contribution Award (1996), IEEE Internet Award (2000), SIGMETRICS Achievement Award (2003).

==== Computer science ====
- Turing Award (1966)
- ACM Prize in Computing (2007)
- IEEE John von Neumann Medal (1992)
- Computer Pioneer Award (1981)^{1}
- IMU Abacus Medal (1982)^{2}
- 1: The Computer Pioneer Award recognizes significant contributions to concepts and developments in the electronic computer field which have clearly advanced the state of the art in computing. The award focuses on the achievements of the concrete implementations which were made at least fifteen years earlier and have become major milestones in computer history.
- 2: The IMU Abacus Medal is awarded once every four years to a mathematician/computer scientist under 40 years of age on the occasion of the International Congress of Mathematicians (ICM). It was called as Rolf Nevanlinna Prize from 1982 to 2018 and honored 10 recipients in total. The award focuses on the mathematical and theoretical aspects of computer science.

See also ACM Prize in Computing (2007) to distinguished early to mid-career computer scientists, Milner Award (2012) exclusively to European researchers.

==== Information technology ====
- W. Wallace McDowell Award (1966)
- C&C Prize (1985)
- Mountbatten Medal (1992)

==== Information theory ====
- Claude E. Shannon Award (1972)
- IEEE Richard W. Hamming Medal (1988)

==== Quantum information science ====
- International Quantum Communication Award (1996)
- Micius Quantum Prize (2018)
- Rolf Landauer and Charles H. Bennett Award in Quantum Computing (2017)^{1}
- 1: The Rolf Landauer and Charles H. Bennett Award is sponsored by the American Physical Society and partially endowed by IBM. It recognizes outstanding research in quantum information processing over the past 10 years performed by a quantum scientist who has received a PhD degree within 12 years.

==== Robotics ====
- Joseph F. Engelberger Robotics Award (1977)
- IEEE Robotics and Automation Award (2004)

==== Technology ====
- Millennium Technology Prize (2004)

There are two other technology awards also sometimes referred to as a "Nobel":

- Lemelson–MIT Prize (1995), which is dubbed as the "Nobel Prize of inventing" or "Oscar for inventors", awarded to outstanding mid-career inventors who are U.S. citizens or permanent residents, and have received a bachelor's degree within 25 years, as well as Lemelson–MIT Lifetime Achievement Award (awarded from 1995 to 2006), which recognized distinguished inventors whose pioneering spirit and inventiveness throughout their careers improved society and inspired others
- Honda Prize (1980), an international award that acknowledges the efforts of an individual or group who contribute new ideas which may lead the next generation in the field of ecotechnology, sometimes referred to as the "Nobel Prize in technology" since it has put a spotlight on achievements in a variety of fields based on a wide perspective in the future, including two Turing-awarded artificial intelligence accomplishments

=== Physical and applied sciences ===
==== Astronomy ====
- Kavli Prize in Astrophysics (2008)
- Gruber Prize in Cosmology (2000)
- Crafoord Prize in Astronomy (1985)
- Shaw Prize in Astronomy (2004)
See also Gold Medal of the Royal Astronomical Society (1824), Bruce Medal (1898), Dannie Heineman Prize for Astrophysics (1980), Viktor Ambartsumian International Prize (2010), .

==== Energy research ====
- ENI Award (2008)
- Fermi Award (1956)
- Global Energy Prize (2003)

==== Materials research ====
- Von Hippel Award (1976)
- MRS Medal (1990)

==== Nanoscience ====
- Kavli Prize in Nanoscience (2008)
- Feynman Prize in Nanotechnology (1993)
See also IEEE Cledo Brunetti Award (1978), Pioneer Award in Nanotechnology (2007), ISNSCE Nanoscience Prize (2008), RUSNANOPRIZE Nanotechnology International Prize (2009).

==== Operations research ====
- John von Neumann Theory Prize (1975)

==== Optics/photonics ====
- Frederic Ives Medal/Jarus W. Quinn Prize (1929)
- IEEE Photonics Award (2004)
- SPIE Gold Medal (1977)
- See also Rumford Medal (1800) and Rumford Prize (1839), which recognize significant achievements in either of the fields of heat and light. Other prestigious optics and photonics awards include Thomas Young Medal and Prize (1963, succeeding the Thomas Young Oration since 1907), Rank Prize in Optoelectronics (1976), ZEISS Research Award (1990).
- For quantum electronics and optics, see also IEEE Photonics Society Quantum Electronics Award (1978), Charles Hard Townes Award (1981), LIA Arthur L. Schawlow Award (1982), Arthur L. Schawlow Prize in Laser Science (1991), EPS-QEOD Quantum Electronics Prizes (1996), Willis E. Lamb Award for Laser Science and Quantum Optics (1998). Some other related awards include Frank Isakson Prize for Optical Effects in Solids (1980), I. I. Rabi Prize (1991), Joseph Thomson Medal and Prize (2008), Norman F. Ramsey Prize (2018).

=== Biological sciences, cognitive sciences and health sciences ===
==== Bioengineering ====
- Russ Prize (2001)
- Robert A. Pritzker Distinguished Lecture Award (1991)

==== Biology/ecology ====
- Crafoord Prize in Biosciences (1984)

==== Biomedicine ====
- Lasker Award (1946)
- Canada Gairdner Award (1959)
- Wolf Prize in Medicine (1978)

Note: These distinguished awards are also regarded as significant markers for future Nobels. Other prestigious biomedical science awards include Paul Ehrlich and Ludwig Darmstaedter Prize (1952), Robert Koch Prize (1960), Louis-Jeantet Prize (1986), Warren Alpert Foundation Prize (1987), Keio Medical Science Prize (1996), Massry Prize (1996), Albany Medical Center Prize (2001), Wiley Prize (2002), etc. See also King Faisal Prize (1982), Heineken Prizes (1989), Shaw Prize (2004), BBVA Foundation Frontiers of Knowledge Awards (2008), Breakthrough Prize (2013), Tang Prize (2014)

==== Brewing ====
- American Society of Brewing Chemists Award of Distinction (1998)

==== Cognitive science ====
- Rumelhart Prize (2001)
- Jean Nicod Prize (1993) recognizes top research in philosophically oriented cognitive sciences and the philosophy of mind.

==== Conservation biology ====
- Indianapolis Prize (2006)
- BBVA Foundation Frontiers of Knowledge Award in Ecology and Conservation Biology (2008)

==== Dentistry/oral sciences ====
- IADR Gold Medal (2018)
- IADR Distinguished Scientist Award (1960)

==== Epidemiology ====
- John Goldsmith Award, considered the Nobel Prize of environmental epidemiologists.

==== Microbiology ====
- Leeuwenhoek Medal (1875)

==== Neuroscience ====
- Brain Prize (2011)

==== Nursing ====
- Florence Nightingale Medal (1920)

==== Optometry ====
- Glenn A. Fry Award

==== Pharmaceutical research ====
- Prix Galien Award

==== Psychology ====
- Grawemeyer Award (2001)
- Kurt-Koffka Medal (2008)

=== Geosciences, agricultural sciences and environmental sciences ===
==== Agriculture ====
- Wolf Prize in Agriculture (1978)
- World Food Prize (1987)
- Bertebos Prize (1997)

==== Atmospheric science ====
- Carl-Gustaf Rossby Research Medal (1951)

==== Earth science ====
- Crafoord Prize in Geosciences (1983)
- Nemmers Prize in Earth Sciences (2016)
See also 'Geology' below, as well as Gold Medal in Geophysics (1824), Arthur L. Day Medal (1948), Arthur L. Day Prize and Lectureship (1972).

==== Environmental science ====
- Blue Planet Prize (1992)
- Tyler Prize for Environmental Achievement (1974)

==== Forestry ====
- Marcus Wallenberg Prize (1981)

==== Geography ====
- The Swedish Society for Anthropology and Geography (SSAG), whose highest patron is the King of Sweden, awards a Gold Medal (called Retzius Medal before 2015) to world-leading scholars in human geography and anthropology.
- Vautrin Lud Prize (1991)
- Vega Medal (1881)^{1}
- 1: The Vega Medal is awarded by the Swedish Society for Anthropology and Geography (SSAG), whose highest patron is the King of Sweden. The SSAG awards the Vega Medal to an outstanding physical geographer roughly every three years, presented by the King. The SSAG also awards another Gold Medal (called Anders Retzius Medal before 2015) to world-leading scholars in human geography and anthropology.

==== Geology ====
- Vetlesen Prize (1960)
- Wollaston Medal (1831)
- Penrose Medal (1927)

==== Hydrology ====
- International Hydrology Prize (1981)
- Robert E. Horton Medal (1976)

==== Limnology ====
- Naumann-Thienemann Medal (1930)

==== Meteorology ====
- International Meteorological Organization Prize (1956)

==== Oceanography ====
- A.G. Huntsman Award for Excellence in the Marine Sciences (1980)
- Alexander Agassiz Medal (1913)

==== Soil science ====
- Dokuchaev Award

==== Sustainability ====
- Katerva Award

There are two other environmental awards often referred to as a "Nobel":

- Goldman Environmental Prize (1990) for environmental activism, often referred to as the "Green Nobel"
- Stockholm Water Prize (1991) for water-related achievements, known as the "Nobel Prize of water"

=== Social sciences and disciplines ===
==== Anthropology ====
- Huxley Memorial Medal and Lecture (1900)
- The Swedish Society for Anthropology and Geography (SSAG), whose highest patron is the King of Sweden, awards a Gold Medal (called Retzius Medal before 2015) to world-leading scholars in anthropology and human geography.

==== Criminology ====
- Stockholm Prize in Criminology (2006)

==== Economics ====
Although there is an economic sciences prize sponsored by the Nobel Foundation, the following have also been referred to colloquially:

- John Bates Clark Medal (1947)^{1}
- Erwin Plein Nemmers Prize in Economics (1994)
- John von Neumann Award (1995)^{2}
- 1: The Clark Medal is awarded annually (biennially before 2009) to an economist under 40 years of age who work in the U.S. at the time of the award, regardless of his/her nationality. The Clark is known as the "Baby Nobel" in economics because around a third of the medalists have gone on to win the Nobel, the average age of whose laureates approaches 70 when they were awarded the prize. Similar prizes for young talent economists in the world include the Yrjö Jahnsson Award (1993), the European equivalent awarded to European economists under 45 years of age; the Nakahara Prize (1995) awarded to Japanese economists under 45 years of age; the Gossen Prize (1997) awarded to German-speaking economists under 45 years of age; the Prix du Meilleur Jeune Économiste de France (2000) awarded to French economists under 40 years of age; and the Assar Lindbeck Medal (2007) awarded to Swedish economists under 45 years of age.
- 2: The John von Neumann Award, which honors professors with top contributions to economics and social sciences, is distinguished from other scientific awards on the basis that it is given by students. The students at the Rajk László College for Advanced Studies (Budapest, Hungary), which is a self governing community of about 100 selected students living together, elect the nominees and vote for the prize-winner in the Assembly of the College after a review and debate regarding the candidates every year. Recipients are invited to the college to receive the award, give an open lecture and hold a master class. It also needs to be noted that there are three other prizes named after Hungarian–American polymath John von Neumann in this prize list, the SIAM John von Neumann Lecture (1960) for distinguished contributions to the field of applied mathematical sciences, the IEEE John von Neumann Medal (1992) for outstanding achievements in computer-related science and technology, and the INFORMS John von Neumann Theory Prize (1975) for fundamental and sustained contributions to theory in operations research and the management sciences.

==== Education ====
- Karolinska Prize for Research in Medical Education (2004)
- WISE Prize
- Yidan Prize is the world's most prestigious award in educational research.

==== Entrepreneurship ====
- Global Award for Entrepreneurship Research (1996)

==== Finance ====
- Deutsche Bank Prize in Financial Economics (2005)
- IAQF Financial Engineer of the Year (1993)
- Fischer Black Prize (2003)^{1}
- 1: The Fischer Black Prize is awarded biennially to a finance economist who is either under 40 years of age, or under 45 years of age but not have been awarded a Ph.D. (or equivalent) by age 35.

==== Futures studies ====
- UNESCO Chair in Futures Studies and Futures Literacy

==== History ====
- Dan David Prize, originally awarding innovative research that cut across traditional boundaries and paradigms; starting in 2022 switched its focus to support outstanding contributions to the study of history and other disciplines that shed light on the human past. It is the largest history prize in the world, and has been referred to as the 'Nobel of historians'.
See also 'Humanities' below.

==== Human rights ====
- Martin Ennals Award (1994)

==== Journalism ====
- Pulitzer Prize

==== Law ====
- World Peace & Liberty Award

==== Linguistics ====
- Neil and Saras Smith Medal for Linguistics (2014)

==== Political science ====
- Johan Skytte Prize in Political Science (1995)

==== Public service/public administration ====
- United Nations Public Service Awards (2003)

==== Records and Information Management ====
- Emmett Leahy Award (1967)^{1}
- 1: The Emmett Leahy Award is given annually to individuals who have had major impact on the field of information management. The award has been given since 1967, and honors Emmett Leahy, a pioneer in records management.

==== Social sciences/sociology ====
- Holberg Prize (2003)
- Nobel Memorial Prize in Economic Sciences^{1}
- Stein Rokkan Prize for Comparative Social Science Research (1981)
For awards focused on specific social science disciplines, see for example 'Anthropology', 'Criminology', 'Economics', 'Geography', and 'Political Science' above, and 'Urbanism' below.
1: Since the 1990s, the Nobel Memorial Prize in Economics has been considered a general award in the social sciences (not just economics).

==== Tourism ====
- UNWTO Ulysses Prize (2003)

==== Urbanism ====
- Lee Kuan Yew World City Prize (2010)

=== Humanities and arts ===
==== Architecture ====
- Pritzker Prize (1979)
- Stirling Prize (1996)

==== Arts ====
- Praemium Imperiale, includes award categories in painting, sculpture, architecture, music, and a single film and theatre category (1988)
- Wolf Prize in Arts (1981)

==== Design ====
- Compasso d'Oro (1954)
- London Design Medal (2007)
- Red Dot Design Award (1955)

==== Film ====
- Oscar, Academy Awards (1929)

==== Humanities ====
- Kluge Prize (2003)
See also 'Prizes sponsored by the Nobel Foundation' and 'History' above, as well as 'Philosophy' below.

==== Music/musicology ====
- Ernst von Siemens Music Prize (1972)
- Polar Music Prize (1989)
- Wihuri Sibelius Prize (1953)
- Grammy Awards (1959)

==== Philosophy ====
- Berggruen Philosophy Prize (2016)
- Rolf Schock Prize(1993)
- Jean Nicod Prize recognizes top research in the philosophy of mind and philosophically oriented cognitive sciences.
See also 'Humanities' above.

==== Photography ====
- Hasselblad Award (1980)

==== Religion ====
- Templeton Prize (1973)

==== Sports ====
- Laureus World Sports Awards

==== Theology ====
- Ratzinger Prize

== See also ==
- Ig Nobel Prize (1991), a satiric prize to celebrate ten unusual or trivial achievements in scientific research every year
- Right Livelihood Award (1980), which recognizes contributions to solving global problems, oftentimes called "Alternative Nobel Prize" and understood as a critique of the traditional Nobel prizes
- Japan Prize (1985), which recognizes outstanding achievements in applied science (as opposed to the Nobel prizes, which tend to focus on basic science), selecting two fields for the prize according to current trends in science and technology
- Kyoto Prize (1985), which was created in collaboration with the Nobel Foundation and is regarded by many as Japan's version of the Nobel Prizes, representing one of the most prestigious awards available in fields that are not traditionally honored with a Nobel, consisting of three different categories: advanced technology, basic sciences, and arts and philosophy
- Crafoord Prize (1982), whose laureates are selected by Swedish Royal Academies, who are also responsible for the selection of Nobel Prize laureates in physics, chemistry, literature, and economics, recognizing outstanding achievements in four disciplines to complement the Nobel (namely, astronomy and mathematics; geosciences; biosciences, with particular emphasis on ecology; and polyarthritis research), of which only one prize is awarded each year on a rotating basis by discipline, and the prize in polyarthritis is awarded only when substantial progress in the field has been made
- Rolf Schock Prizes (1993), which are awarded every three years also by Swedish Royal Academies, including four prizes in the fields of logic and philosophy, mathematics, the visual arts, and music
- Heineken Prizes (1964), which are awarded every two years by Royal Netherlands Academy of Arts and Sciences, including six prizes in the fields of biophysics and biochemistry (1964), art (1988), medicine (1989), history (1990), environmental science (1990), and cognitive science (2006)
- Harvey Prize (1972), which is a prestigious Israeli award, with more than a quarter of recipients going on to win the Nobel (while recipients of the Nobel or Wolf Prizes are generally not eligible for the Harvey Prize, unless the accomplishments cited in the nomination represent new or different work), recognizing breakthroughs in science and technology, as well as contributions to peace in the Middle East
- Bower Awards (1990), conferred by the Franklin Institute, including the Bower Award and Prize for Achievement in Science, which recognizes significant contributions in a prescribed discipline that changes each year, and the Bower Award for Business Leadership, which recognizes individuals who have demonstrated outstanding leadership in an American business or industry
- Benjamin Franklin Medal (1998), which recognizes outstanding contributions in seven disciplines of science and engineering (namely, chemistry; civil and mechanical engineering; computer and cognitive science; earth and environmental science; electrical engineering; life science; and physics), created in 1998 by reorganizing all of the endowed medals presented by the Franklin Institute at that time, including the Franklin Medal presented from 1915 until 1997, the Elliott Cresson Medal presented from 1875 until 1997, and other Franklin Institute medals presented since 1824, which have long been recognized as the oldest, and most comprehensive science and technology honor bestowed in the United States and around the world
- Copley Medal (1731), conferred by the Royal Society, thought to be the world's oldest science prize, pre-dating the Nobel Prize by 170 years, and now alternating between the physical sciences (including mathematics, chemistry, astronomy, geology) and the biological sciences (odd and even years respectively)
- Feltrinelli Prize (1950), conferred by the Accademia Nazionale dei Lincei, the world's oldest existing Academy of Sciences, annually awarding an International Prize, which rotates around five categories (namely, humanities; physical, mathematical and natural sciences; literature; arts; medicine), as well as a possible special international prize for an exceptional enterprise of high moral and humanitarian value; four National Prizes whose fields vary each year; and four additional national prizes entitled "Antonio Feltrinelli Giovani" to Italian scholars under 40 years of age, as well as another possible Antonio Feltrinelli Giovani one to a foreigner who has established a collaboration with an Italian scientific institution for at least 24 months
- Lomonosov Gold Medal (1959), conferred by the USSR Academy of Sciences and later the Russian Academy of Sciences, annually awarding two medals, one to a domestic scientist and one to a foreigner for outstanding achievements in the natural sciences as well as the humanities, an award similar to which conferred by the National Academy of Sciences of Ukraine is the Vernadsky Gold Medal (2003)
- Grande Médaille (1997), conferred by the French Academy of Sciences, to an international distinguished researcher in a different field each year, created in 1997 by combining more than 100 historic foundation prizes, such as Lalande-Valz Prize (Lalande Prize, 1803–1970; Valz Prize, 1877–1970; Lalande-Valz Prize, 1970–1996) and Poincaré Medal (1914–1996)
- Max Planck-Humboldt Research Award (2018), succeeding the Max Planck Research Award for International Cooperation (1990–2004) and the Max Planck Research Award (2004–2017), annually awarded to an internationally renowned mid-career researcher with outstanding future potential from outside Germany but having a strong interest in a research residency in Germany for limited time periods, alternately in the fields of natural and engineering sciences, human sciences, and life sciences, as well as the Max Planck-Humboldt Medal (2018) awarded to other two finalists
- Breakthrough Prize (2013), the world's most generous science prize, known as the "Oscars of Science", recognizing outstanding achievements in three categories: life sciences, fundamental physics, and mathematics
- Kavli Prize (2008), which recognizes scientists for their seminal advances in three research areas: astrophysics, nanoscience, and neuroscience, awarded every second year
- Future Science Prize (2016), awarded to life sciences, physical sciences and mathematics. It has sometimes been called "China's Nobel Prize".
- Gruber Prizes (2000), whose International Prize Program honors scientists in the fields of cosmology (2000), genetics (2001), and neuroscience (2004) for their groundbreaking work providing new models that inspire and enable fundamental shifts in knowledge and culture; and whose two other previous prizes for justice (2001–2011) and women's rights (2003–2011) have merged and transitioned into the Gruber Program for Global Justice and Women's Rights
- Shaw Prize (2004), which is described as the "Nobel of the East" or "Nobel Prize of Asia", recognizing outstanding contributions in three categories: astronomy, life science and medicine, and mathematical sciences
- Tang Prize (2014), which is also considered as an Asian Nobel, recognizing outstanding contributions in four categories: sustainable development, biopharmaceutical science, sinology, and rule of law
- Ramon Magsaysay Award (1958), which is also considered as the Nobel Prize counterpart of Asia, awarded exclusively to Asian individuals and organizations for their outstanding contributions in six categories (namely, government service; public service; community leadership; journalism, literature and creative communication arts; peace and international understanding; and emergent leadership), the first five of which have been succeeded by an uncategorized one since 2009, celebrating greatness of spirit and transformative leadership in Asia
- King Faisal Prize (1979), which recognizes outstanding contributions in five categories (namely, service to Islam; Islamic studies; Arabic language and literature; medicine; and science), the first three of which are widely considered as the most prestigious awards in the Muslim world, and more than 20 laureates of the other two in science and medicine have won the Nobel
- Mustafa Prize (2015), which is dubbed the "Islamic Nobel Prize" for science and technology, and is awarded to the scientists working in the member states of the Organisation of Islamic Cooperation for outstanding contributions in three selected categories (namely, information and communication science and technology; life and medical science and technology; and nanoscience and nanotechnology), regardless of his/her religion; and also awarded to best Muslim scientists all over the world in all areas of science and technology, regardless of his/her nationality
- Infosys Prize (2008), which could be called the Nobel Prize of India, recognizing outstanding contributions in six categories: mathematical sciences (2008), physical sciences (2009), life sciences (2009), social sciences (2009), engineering and computer science (2010), and humanities (2012), awarded to researchers under 50 years of age, in a preference order to ones of Indian residents (Indian citizens and non-Indians who have been residing in India for at least three years), ones of Indian origin, and ones of any nationality or origin, resident and working anywhere, who has done world class work in their field
- Princess of Asturias Awards (1981), formerly the Prince of Asturias Awards from 1981 to 2014, seen as the Spain's version of the Nobel Prizes or the Hispanic world's Nobel, recognizing notable achievements in sciences, humanities, and public affairs, consisting of eight different categories: arts, social sciences, communication and humanities, concord (peace), international cooperation, sports, technical and scientific research, and literature
- BBVA Foundation Frontiers of Knowledge Awards (2008), which recognize significant contributions in eight categories: basic science (physics, chemistry, mathematics); biology and biomedicine; ecology and conservation biology; climate change; information and communications technologies; economics, finance and management; humanities and social sciences; music and opera
- WCC World Awards (1984), including the Albert Einstein World Award of Science (1984), the José Vasconcelos World Award of Education (1985), and the Leonardo da Vinci World Award of Arts (1989), which are awarded to outstanding scientists, educators, and artists, respectively, and the first one is awarded annually and the other two alternate in even and odd years respectively
- Dan David Prize (2002), from 2002 to 2021 annually awarded three prizes whose fields vary each year and are chosen within the three time dimensions - Past, Present and Future, for achievements having an outstanding scientific, technological, cultural or social impact on our world. Later switched its focus to become exclusively a history prize (see 'History' subsection above.)
- Balzan Prize (1961), which annually awards four prizes chosen from two categories (namely, literature, moral sciences and the arts; and physical, mathematical and natural sciences and medicine), two per category, whose fields vary each year; and also awards a prize for humanity, peace and fraternity among peoples every three to seven years
- Heinz Awards (1995), which annually award five prizes in the fields of arts and humanities; environment; human condition; public policy; and technology, the economy and employment; and in certain years also award the Chairman's Medal to honor the lifetime achievement of a particular individual
- Grawemeyer Award (1985), which pays tribute to the power of creative ideas, emphasizing the impact a single idea can have on the world, rather than a lifetime of accomplishment, honoring individuals in the fields of music composition (1985), ideas improving world order (1988), education (1989), religion (1990), and psychology (2001)
