= Thomas J. Sargent =

American economist and Nobel Laureate (born 1943)

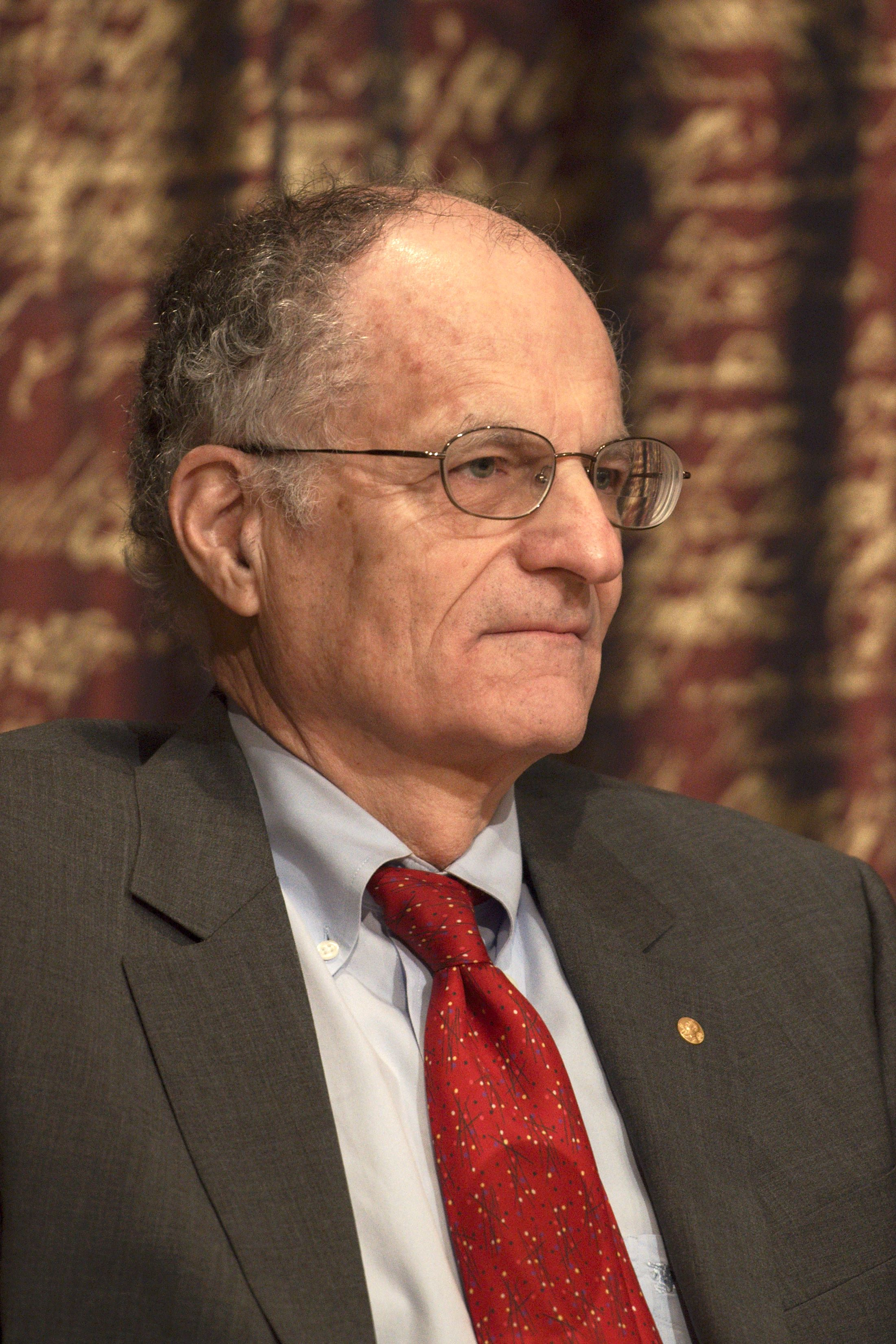
- Sargent in 2011
- Born: July 19, 1943 (age 83); Pasadena, California, U.S.

Academic background
- Education: University of California, Berkeley (BA); Harvard University (PhD)
- Thesis: The structure of interest rates (1968)
- Doctoral advisor: John R. Meyer
- Influences: John F. Muth · Robert E. Lucas, Jr. · Christopher A. Sims · Neil Wallace

Academic work
- Discipline: Macroeconomics, monetary economics
- Institutions: University of Pennsylvania (Wharton School); Hoover Institution; Carnegie Mellon University; University of Minnesota; University of Chicago; Stanford University; New York University; Seoul National University; Peking University HSBC Business School
- Doctoral students: Robert Litterman · Monika Piazzesi · Mariacristina De Nardi · Ellen McGrattan · Lars Peter Hansen · Albert Marcet · Noah Williams · Laura Veldkamp · Richard Clarida · Danny Quah · Sagiri Kitao · Martin Eichenbaum · Lawrence J. Christiano · Greg Kaplan
- Awards: Nemmers Prize in Economics (1996) · NAS Award for Scientific Reviewing (2011) · Nobel Memorial Prize in Economic Sciences (2011)
- Military career
- Allegiance: United States
- Branch: United States Army
- Service years: 1968–1969
- Rank: Captain
- Website: Information at IDEAS / RePEc

Thomas John Sargent (born July 19, 1943) is an American economist and a Rowan Distinguished Professor of Finance at the Wharton School of the University of Pennsylvania. He specializes in the fields of macroeconomics, monetary economics, and time series econometrics. He was awarded the Nobel Memorial Prize in Economics in 2011 together with Christopher A. Sims for their "empirical research on cause and effect in the macroeconomy".

Sargent previously held a joint appointment at New York University, where he joined the university in 2002 as the first W. R. Berkley Professor of Economics and Business. He has also held teaching positions at the University of Pennsylvania (1970–71), University of Minnesota (1971–87), University of Chicago (1991–98), and Stanford University (1998–2002), as well as a visiting position at Princeton University.

== Education ==
Sargent graduated from Monrovia High School. He earned his B.A. from the University of California, Berkeley in 1964, being the University Medalist as Most Distinguished Scholar in Class of 1964, and his PhD from Harvard in 1968, under supervision of John R. Meyer. Sargent's classmates at Harvard included Christopher A. Sims. After serving in the U.S. Army as a first lieutenant and captain, he moved on to teaching. He held teaching positions at the University of Pennsylvania (1970–71), University of Minnesota (1971–87), University of Chicago (1991–98), Stanford University (1998–2002) and Princeton University (2009), and is currently a professor of economics at New York University (since 2002). He previously held the position of President of the American Economic Association and the Econometric Society where he has been a fellow since 1976. In 1983, Sargent was elected to the National Academy of Sciences and also the American Academy of Arts and Sciences. He has been a senior fellow of the Hoover Institution at Stanford University since the year 1987.

== Professional contributions ==
Sargent is one of the leaders of the "rational expectations revolution," which argues that the people being modeled by economists can predict the future, or the probability of future outcomes, at least as well as the economist can with his model. Rational expectations was introduced into economics by John Muth, then Robert Lucas, Jr., and Edward C. Prescott took it much farther. In work written in close collaboration with Lucas and Neil Wallace, Thomas J. Sargent contributed fundamentally to the evolution of new classical macroeconomics.

Sargent's main contributions to rational expectations were these:

- trace the implications of rational expectations, with Wallace, for alternative monetary-policy instruments and rules on output stability and price determinacy.
- help make the theory of rational expectations statistically operational.
- provide some early examples of rational expectations models of the Phillips curve, the term structure of interest rates, and the demand for money during hyperinflations.
- analyze, along with Wallace, the dimensions along which monetary and fiscal policy must be coordinated intertemporally.
- conduct several historical studies that put rational expectations reasoning to work to explain consequences of dramatic changes in macroeconomic policy regimes.

In 1975 he and Wallace proposed the policy-ineffectiveness proposition, which challenged a basic assumption of Keynesian economics.

Sargent went on to refine or extend rational expectations reasoning by further:

- studying the conditions under which systems with bounded rationality of agents and adaptive learners converge to rational expectations.
- using the notion of a self-confirming equilibrium, a weaker notion of rational expectations suggested by limits of learning models.
- studying contexts with Lars Peter Hansen in which decision makers do not trust their probability model. In particular, Hansen and Sargent adapt and extend methods from robust control theory.

Sargent has also been a pioneer in introducing recursive economics to academic study, especially for macroeconomic issues such as unemployment, fiscal and monetary policy, and growth. His series of textbooks, co-authored with Lars Ljungqvist, are seminal in the contemporary graduate economics curriculum.

Sargent has pursued a research program with Ljungqvist designed to understand determinants of differences in unemployment outcomes in Europe and the United States during the last 30 years. The two key questions the program addresses are why, in the 1950s and 1960s, unemployment was systematically lower in Europe than in the United States and why, for two and a half decades after 1980, unemployment has been systematically higher in Europe than in the United States. In "Two Questions about European Unemployment," the answer is that "Europe has stronger employment protection despite also having had more generous government supplied unemployment compensation"." While the institutional differences remained the same over this time period, the microeconomic environment for workers changed, with a higher risk of human capital depreciation in the 1980s.

In 1997, he won the Nemmers Prize in Economics

In 2011, he was awarded the NAS Award for Scientific Reviewing from the National Academy of Sciences and, in September, he became the recipient of the 2011 CME Group-MSRI Prize in Innovative Quantitative Applications.

Sargent's reading group at Stanford and NYU is a known institution among graduate students in economics.

In 2016, Sargent helped found the non-profit QuantEcon project, which is dedicated to the development and documentation of modern open source computational tools for economics, econometrics, and decision making.

Currently he is director of the Sargent Institute of Quantitative Economics and Finance (SIQEF) at Peking University HSBC Business School in Shenzhen.

In 2026, Federal Reserve Chair Kevin Warsh appointed Sargent, together with Greg Mankiw and William White, to lead a task force on the central bank's inflation framework.

== Nobel Prize ==
Interview with Thomas J. Sargent after his Nobel lecture

On October 10, 2011, Sargent, with Christopher A. Sims, was awarded the Nobel Memorial Prize in Economic Sciences. The award cited their "empirical research on cause and effect in the macroeconomy". His Nobel lecture, "United States Then, Europe Now," was delivered on December 11, 2011.

== In popular culture ==
He is featured playing himself in a television commercial for Ally Financial in which he is asked if he can predict CD rates two years from now, to which he simply answers, "No."

Sargent is notable for making short speeches. For example, in 2007 his Berkeley graduation speech consumed 335 words.

== Selected publications ==
- Sargent, Thomas J. (1971). "A Note on the Accelerationist Controversy". Journal of Money, Credit and Banking. 3 (3): 721–25. doi:10.2307/1991369. JSTOR 1991369.
- Sargent, Thomas J. & Neil Wallace (1973). "The Stability of Models of Money and Growth with Perfect Foresight". Econometrica. 41 (6): 1043–48. doi:10.2307/1914034. JSTOR 1914034.
- Sargent, Thomas & Wallace, Neil (1975). "'Rational' Expectations, the Optimal Monetary Instrument, and the Optimal Money Supply Rule". Journal of Political Economy. 83 (2): 241–54. doi:10.1086/260321. S2CID 154301791.
- Sargent, Thomas & Wallace, Neil (1976). "Rational Expectations and the Theory of Economic Policy" (PDF). Journal of Monetary Economics. 2 (2): 169–83. doi:10.1016/0304-3932(76)90032-5.
- Sargent, Thomas J. (1987) [1979]. Macroeconomic Theory. New York: Academic Press. ISBN 978-0126197501.
- Sargent, Thomas J. and Lars P. Hansen (1980). "Formulating and Estimating Dynamic Linear Rational Expectations Models" (PDF). Journal of Economic Dynamics and Control. 2 (1): 7–46. doi:10.1016/0165-1889(80)90049-4.
- Sargent, Thomas J. & Neil Wallace (1981). "Some Unpleasant Monetarist Arithmetic". Federal Reserve Bank of Minneapolis Quarterly Review. 5 (3): 1–17.
- Sargent, Thomas J. (1983). "The Ends of Four Big Inflations" in: Inflation: Causes and Effects, ed. by Robert E. Hall, University of Chicago Press, for the NBER, 1983, pp. 41–97.
- Sargent, Thomas J. (1987). Dynamic Macroeconomic Theory. Harvard University Press. ISBN 978-0674218772.
- Sargent, Thomas J. and Albert Marcet (1989). "Convergence of Least Squares Learning Mechanisms in Self-Referential Linear Stochastic Models". Journal of Economic Theory. 48 (2): 337–68. doi:10.1016/0022-0531(89)90032-X.
- Sargent, Thomas J. & Albert Marcet (1989). "Convergence of Least Squares Learning in Environments with Hidden State Variables and Private Information". Journal of Political Economy. 97 (6): 251. doi:10.1086/261603. S2CID 154864867.
- Sargent, Thomas J. & Lars Ljungqvist (2000). Recursive Macroeconomic Theory. MIT Press. ISBN 978-0-262-12274-0.
- Sargent, Thomas J. & Lars Hansen (2001). "Robust Control and Model Uncertainty". American Economic Review. 91 (2): 60–66. doi:10.1257/aer.91.2.60.

Academic offices
Preceded by George Akerlof	President of the American Economic Association; 2007– 2008	Succeeded by Avinash Dixit
Awards
Preceded by Peter A. Diamond; Dale T. Mortensen; Christopher A. Pissarides	Laureate of the Nobel Memorial Prize in Economics; 2011; Served alongside: Christopher A. Sims	Succeeded by Alvin E. Roth; Lloyd S. Shapley
