= Mariacristina De Nardi =

Italian economist

- Born: Treviso, Italy
- Education: Ca' Foscari University of Venice; University of Chicago
- Occupations: Economist, researcher, speaker, editor
- Website: http://users.nber.org/~denardim/

Mariacristina De Nardi is an economist who was born in Treviso, Italy. She is the Thomas Sargent Professor at the University of Minnesota since 2019. In 2013, De Nardi was appointed professor of economics at University College London; since September 2018, she has been a senior scholar at the Opportunity and Inclusive Growth Institute of the Federal Reserve Bank of Minneapolis. Her research interests include macroeconomics, public economics, wealth distribution, savings, social-insurance reform, social security, household economics, health shocks, medical expenses, fertility and human capital.

== Education ==
De Nardi received a B.A. in economics and commerce with highest honours from Ca' Foscari University of Venice in Italy in November 1993. She received an M.A. degree in June 1998 and a Ph.D. in August 1999, both from the University of Chicago.

== Career ==
After receiving her B.A. degree, De Nardi was a research fellow at Ca' Foscari University of Venice. She became an economist at the Federal Reserve Bank of Chicago in 1998, was an assistant professor in the department of economics at the University of Minnesota from 2000 to 2005, and was a research assistant for Thomas J. Sargent. Before receiving her M.A. degree from the University of Chicago, De Nardi was a teaching assistant at the school. In addition to her appointments at University College London and the Federal Reserve Bank of Minneapolis, she has been a faculty research fellow at the National Bureau of Economic Research since 2006, an international research fellow at the Institute of Fiscal Studies since 2015, and a research fellow at the Center for Economic and Policy Research since 2016. In 2018, De Nardi became first vice-president of the Midwest Economic Association. She is a coordinator and leader in the Market Network at Human Capital and Economic Opportunity (HCEO). Before moving to the Federal Reserve Bank of Minneapolis in 2018, De Nardi was a senior economist and advisor in the research department of the Federal Reserve Bank of Chicago. She is a fellow of the European Economic Association and a research associate at the NBER.

She has been an editor of the Review of Economic Dynamics since 2017. Since 2015, De Nardi has been on the editorial board of the Journal of Economic Literature. From 2014 to 2017, she was associate editor of the Journal of the European Economic Association and Fiscal Studies.

== Publications ==
De Nardi has written over 30 articles on topics including the role of bequests and entrepreneurship in wealth distribution, the medical expenditures of the elderly, the impact of Social Security reform on the general economy, the relationship between fertility and social security, and the effects of estate taxation.

- "Family and Government Insurance: Wage, Earnings, and Income Risks in the Netherlands and the US" (2019). De Nardi co-authored the article with Giulio Fella, Marike Knoef, Gonzalo Paz-Pardo and Raun Van Ooijen. It examines the size and distribution of wage shocks and the role of insurance against these shocks in the United States and the Netherlands.
- "The Lifetime Costs of Bad Health" (2018). Poor health can shorten a person's life expectancy. This article explores the effects of health shocks over a lifetime. Co-authored with Svetlana Pashchenko and Ponpoke Porapakkarm, the article developed a structural framework to help measure the long-term effects of poor health.
- "The Aggregate Implications of Gender and Marriage" (2018). Margherita Borella, Mariacristina De Nardi, Fang Yang investigate the aggregate importance of gender and marriage. They note that most macroeconomists ignore women and marriage when setting up structural models and when calibrating them using data on men only. They state that by modelling marriage and gender explicitly would give the best results for matching the aggregates.
- "Inequality and Recessions" (2018). In this article, Gene Amromin, Mariacristina De Nardi, Karl Schulze investigated whether the widening gap between the rich and poor has any direct effects on macroeconomic aggregates. They largely focus on the Great Recession. By using the Panel Study of Income Dynamics and Credit Bureau Panel Data, they compared consumption and wealth during the Great Recession.
- "End-of-life medical spending in last twelve months of life is lower than previously reported" (2017). Collaborating with 27 other economists, they measured the composition and magnitude of medical spending in the last three years before death. De Nardi, French, et al. concluded that there should be a reduction in the caring costs for people with chronic conditions.
- "Why do the elderly save? The role of medical expenses" (2010). This paper by De Nardi, Eric French and John Bailey Jones construct a model of saving for retired singles that include a mix of different medical expenses and life expectancy.
- "Entrepreneurship, Frictions, and Wealth" (2006). De Nardi received a research grant from the National Science Foundation Research Grant. She is the principal investigator and conducted the research from 2003 to 2006. De Nardi co-authored this journal article with Marco Cagetti.
- "Wealth inequality: Data and models" (2008) De Nardi collaborated with Marco Cagetti to summarize the wealth distribution and its economic models in the United States. The majority of the data they used are from the Survey of Consumer Finances. Cagetti and De Nardi explain that all quantitative models of wealth inequality make human capital exogenous and they argue that we should actually take human capital accumulation into consideration when studying savings and wealth inequality. They also point out that some areas in models of inequality can be employed and extended.
