= Harald Uhlig =

German economist

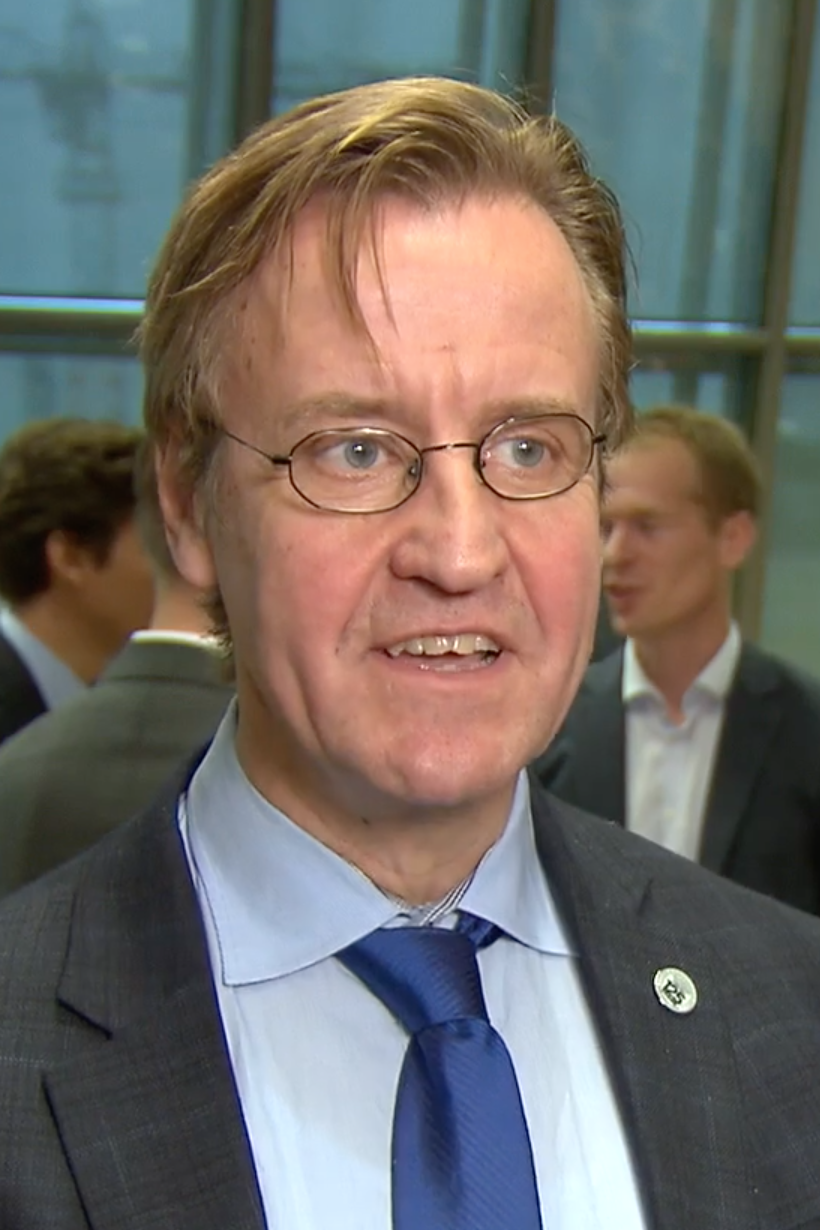
- Uhlig in 2018
- Born: April 26, 1961 (age 65); Bonn, Germany

Academic background
- Education: University of Minnesota (Ph.D. 1990); Technische Universität Berlin (Diplom, 1985)
- Doctoral advisor: Christopher A. Sims

Academic work
- Discipline: Macroeconomics; Financial economics Bayesian econometrics
- Institutions: University of Chicago
- Awards: Gossen Prize (2003)
- Website: Information at IDEAS / RePEc

Harald Friedrich Hans Volker Sigmar Uhlig (born April 26, 1961) is a German macroeconomist and the Bruce Allen and Barbara Ritzenthaler Professor of Economics at the University of Chicago, where he was the chairman of the Department of Economics from 2009 to 2012. His research focuses on macroeconomics, monetary economics, financial markets, and Bayesian time series analysis, particularly at the intersection of macroeconomics and financial economics.

== Education ==
Born in Bonn, Uhlig received his Diplom in mathematics from Technische Universität Berlin in 1985 and earned a doctoral degree in economics at the University of Minnesota in 1990. His Ph.D. thesis, titled "Costly Information Acquisition, Stock Prices and Neoclassical Growth", was supervised by Christopher A. Sims.

He also earned a Vordiplom in economics (1983) and a Vordiplom in mathematics (1982) from Technische Universität Berlin, and his Abitur (high school diploma) from Waldoberschule Berlin in 1979.

== Career ==
Uhlig began his academic career as an assistant professor at Princeton University from 1990 to 1994, having previously worked as a research assistant for Christopher A. Sims at the Federal Reserve Bank of Minneapolis (1986–1989). He subsequently held a research professorship in macroeconomics at CentER, Tilburg University (1994–2000), and a visiting professorship at Stanford University (1999–2000). From 2000 to 2007, he was a professor of economics at Humboldt University of Berlin; during this period, he also maintained a part-time (10%) professorship at CentER, Tilburg University (until 2012), and served as guest researcher at DIW Berlin (2002–2004) and at the Deutsche Bundesbank (from 2004 onward). He held short-term visiting and guest-lecturer positions at the University of Bonn (1993–1994) and, during a sabbatical, at the Center for Economic Studies in Munich, Bonn, and Chicago (1992–1993).

Uhlig joined the faculty of the University of Chicago in 2007 and has remained a member of its Department of Economics ever since, serving as department chairman from 2009 to 2012. In addition to his academic appointments, he has also been a consultant for both the Federal Reserve Bank of Chicago and the European Central Bank, the Deutsche Bundesbank, and the Bank for International Settlements. He is a research associate of the National Bureau of Economic Research (NBER) and chaired the CEPR European Business Cycle Dating Committee from 2005 to 2012.

Uhlig was co-editor of Econometrica from 2006 to 2010. He was a co-editor of the Journal of Political Economy from 2012 to 2021. He was also its lead editor from 2013 to 2021.

=== Controversy ===
In June 2020, Uhlig posted a series of tweets criticizing the "Defund the Police" slogan associated with the Black Lives Matter movement, comparing its proponents to "flat-earthers and creationists," which drew public criticism and was reported on by The New York Times. Around the same time, separate allegations regarding his classroom conduct were raised with the university. As a result, the Federal Reserve Bank of Chicago terminated his contract as consultant and the Journal of Political Economy's editorial board temporarily placed Uhlig on leave pending review. Following an investigation, the university found that there was no basis for further investigation or disciplinary proceedings, and Uhlig was reinstated as editor. He continued in the role of lead editor until the end of his term in 2021.

== Research Interests ==
His research interests are in macroeconomics, financial markets, Bayesian econometrics, and in particular at the intersection of these three. Major fields of concentration include applied quantitative theory and applied dynamic stochastic general equilibrium theory (business cycles, growth, dynamic contracts, psychological foundations of dynamic decision theory, economic policy); the intersection of macroeconomics and financial economics (monetary economics, asset pricing, financial crises); and methods (vector autoregressions, Bayesian time series econometrics, numerical methods). Additional research fields include monetary policy, fiscal policy, sovereign debt crises, digital currencies, cryptocurrencies, central bank digital currency, bank runs, economic dynamics, and asset prices.

In a 1991 Econometrica paper with Christopher A. Sims, "Understanding Unit Rooters: A Helicopter Tour," Uhlig examined the divergence between classical and Bayesian inference in autoregressive models with potential unit roots. Using simulations and graphical "helicopter tour" visualizations, they showed that while the sampling distribution of the least-squares estimator is skewed when the true coefficient is near unity, the likelihood-based posterior remains symmetric. Consequently, treating unit root test p-values as measures of evidence implicitly imposes a sample-dependent prior that places increasing mass on explosive roots. The paper concluded that researchers should report standard test statistics without special unit root corrections, even if corrected p-values are also provided. The paper generated debate, including critiques by Peter C. B. Phillips. Uhlig extended these ideas in a 1994 Econometric Theory article offering practical Bayesian guidance for persistence analysis.

Uhlig's 1997 Econometrica paper introduced stochastic volatility into Bayesian vector autoregressions (BVARs), an approach that has been widely adopted in subsequent research. He also developed Uhlig's Toolkit, a MATLAB library for solving dynamic stochastic general equilibrium (DSGE) models.

In empirical macroeconomics, his 2005 Journal of Monetary Economics paper introduced sign restrictions as an alternative method for identifying monetary policy shocks in structural VARs, an approach that has been widely used and further developed in the literature. With Andrew Mountford, he later applied the method to fiscal policy shocks in a 2009 Journal of Applied Econometrics paper on fiscal multipliers.

More recently, his work has focused on cryptocurrencies and central bank digital currencies, including studies of Bitcoin, currency competition, and the collapse of the TerraUSD/Luna stablecoin. During the COVID-19 pandemic, he co-authored a macroeconomic model evaluating Sweden's pandemic policy, published in Economic Policy in 2022.

== Awards and distinctions ==
- In July 2021, Uhlig was elected a Fellow of the Society for Economic Measurement (SEM).
- In 2017, it was announced that Uhlig was named an Honorary Professor at Henan University in China.
- In 2013, Uhlig was appointed Duisenberg Fellow at the European Central Bank.
- 2012: Granger Lecture, Nottingham University.
- In December 2005, Uhlig received the Frank P. Ramsey Prize for the best paper in Macroeconomic Dynamics, for the article "The Sharpe Ratio and Preferences: A Parametric Approach," with Martin Lettau.
- In December 2003, he was elected Fellow of the Econometric Society.
- In 2003, Uhlig won the Gossen Prize for his contributions to the theory and methods of dynamic macroeconomic models.
- 1989–1990: Alfred P. Sloan Doctoral Dissertation Fellowship and NBER Dissertation Support Award.
- 1985–1986: Fulbright Scholarship.

== Selected publications ==
- "Understanding Unit Rooters: A Helicopter Tour". Econometrica. 59 (6): 1591–1599.
- Uhlig, Harald (1997). "Bayesian Vector Autoregressions with Stochastic Volatility". Econometrica. 65 (1): 59–73.
- Lettau, Martin; Uhlig, Harald (1999). "Rules of Thumb versus Dynamic Programming". American Economic Review. 89 (1): 148–174.
- Uhlig, Harald (2005). "What are the effects of monetary policy on output? Results from an agnostic identification procedure". Journal of Monetary Economics. 52 (2): 381–419.
- Ravn, Morten O.; Uhlig, Harald (2002). "On Adjusting the Hodrick–Prescott Filter for the Frequency of Observations". Review of Economics and Statistics. 84 (2): 371–376.
- Uhlig, Harald (2010). "Some Fiscal Calculus". American Economic Review, Papers and Proceedings. 100 (2): 30–34.
- Mountford, Andrew; ——— (2009). "What are the Effects of Fiscal Policy Shocks?" (PDF). Journal of Applied Econometrics. 24 (6): 960–992. doi:10.1002/jae.1079. S2CID 547059.
- ——— (2005). "What are the Effects of Monetary Policy on Output? Results from an Agnostic Identification Procedure" (PDF). Journal of Monetary Economics. 52 (2): 381–419. doi:10.1016/j.jmoneco.2004.05.007.
- Ravn, Morten O.; ——— (2002). "On Adjusting the Hodrick–Prescott Filter for the Frequency of Observations". Review of Economics and Statistics. 84 (2): 371–376. doi:10.1162/003465302317411604. S2CID 845683.
- Ljungqvist, Lars; ——— (2000). "Tax Policy and Aggregate Demand Management under Catching up with the Joneses". American Economic Review. 90 (3): 356–366. doi:10.1257/aer.90.3.356. JSTOR 117333.
- ——— (1997). "Bayesian Vector Autoregressions with Stochastic Volatility". Econometrica. 65 (1): 59–73. doi:10.2307/2171813. JSTOR 2171813. S2CID 124473617.
- Taylor, John B.; ——— (1990). "Solving Nonlinear Stochastic Growth Models: A Comparison of Alternative Solution Methods" (PDF). Journal of Business and Economic Statistics. 8 (1): 1–17. doi:10.1080/07350015.1990.10509766. S2CID 161599.
