= Lawrence J. Christiano =

American economist and researcher

Academic background
- Education: Columbia University; London School of Economics; University of Minnesota
- Doctoral advisor: Thomas J. Sargent; John B. Taylor

Academic work
- Discipline: Macroeconomics
- Institutions: Northwestern University; Carnegie Mellon University; University of Chicago
- Website: Information at IDEAS / RePEc

Lawrence J. Christiano is an American economist and researcher. He is the Alfred W. Chase Chair in Business Institutions and a professor of economics at Northwestern University. His research is in macroeconomics, macrofinance, and applied time-series analysis, with work on monetary policy, business cycles, dynamic stochastic general equilibrium models, financial frictions, and unemployment. He is a Fellow of the Econometric Society.

== Education ==
Christiano received a Bachelor of Arts degree in history and economics from the University of Minnesota in 1973. He earned a Master of Arts degree in economics from the university in 1975, followed by a Master of Science degree in econometrics and mathematical economics from the London School of Economics in 1977. He received a PhD in economics from Columbia University in 1982.

== Career ==
From 1981 to 1985, Christiano was an assistant professor of business economics at the University of Chicago Graduate School of Business. He was a visiting assistant professor of economics at Carnegie Mellon University from 1984 to 1985.

In 1985, Christiano joined the Research Department of the Federal Reserve Bank of Minneapolis, where he held positions as an economist, senior economist, and research officer. From 1991 to 1992, he was director of the bank's Institute for Empirical Macroeconomics.

Christiano joined Northwestern University as a visiting professor of economics in 1991 and became a professor of economics in 1992. In 2002, he was appointed Alfred W. Chase Chair in Business Institutions. He served as chair of Northwestern's Department of Economics from 2016 to 2018.

He has served as a consultant to the Federal Reserve Bank of Chicago, the Federal Reserve Bank of Cleveland, the Federal Reserve Bank of Minneapolis, the Federal Reserve Bank of Atlanta, and the Federal Reserve Board of Governors. Christiano has also been a visiting scholar at the International Monetary Fund and the European Central Bank.
