= Hansen–Jagannathan bound =

Theorem in financial economics

Hansen–Jagannathan bound is a theorem in financial economics that says that the ratio of the standard deviation of a stochastic discount factor to its mean exceeds the Sharpe ratio attained by any portfolio. This result applies, among others, the Cauchy–Schwarz inequality. The Hansen-Jagannathan (H-J) bound plots as a type of mean-variance frontier. The main contribution is that it allows us to say something about moments of the stochastic discount factor, which is unobservable, in terms of moments of returns, which can be (in principle) observed. Specifically, given the observed Sharpe ratio (say, around 0.4), the bound tells us that the SDF must be at least just as volatile.
