= List of University of Minnesota Law School alumni =

The University of Minnesota Law School is a public law school in Minneapolis, Minnesota. It is part of the University of Minnesota. Following are some of its notable alumni.

== Academia ==
- Johanna Bond, law professor and academic administrator
- Willard L. Boyd, former president of the University of Iowa and Field Museum of Natural History
- Jay Conison, dean of law at the Charlotte School of Law and the past dean of law at Valparaiso University
- Joel Dobris, professor of law at the University of California, Davis
- Neil Fulton, dean of the University of South Dakota School of Law
- Ernest Gellhorn, former dean of law at Arizona State University, Case Western Reserve University, and the University of Washington
- Michael J. Glennon, professor of Law and Diplomacy, Tufts University
- William Hawkland, former chancellor of Louisiana State University
- James L. Hetland Jr., former professor of law at the University of Minnesota
- John Hutson, dean of the University of New Hampshire School of Law and former Judge Advocates General of the Navy
- Robert Kingsley, former dean and the USC Law, and California appellate judge
- Jane Larson, former professor of law at the University of Wisconsin–Madison
- Harry S. Martin, former librarian and professor of law, Harvard University
- Richard C. Maxwell, former dean of law at UCLA
- Grant S. Nelson, former professor of law at UCLA
- John S. Pillsbury, Jr., former president of Northwestern National Life Insurance Company
- Maynard Pirsig, former dean of the University of Minnesota Law School and former temporary justice of the Minnesota Supreme Court
- Daniel D. Polsby, dean of law at George Mason University
- William Prosser, former dean of law at the University of California, Berkeley
- Millard Ruud, former executive director of the Association of American Law Schools and former associate dean of the law of the University of Texas-Austin
- Lee Seokwoo, associate professor of law at Inha University and former Research Scholar at Oxford University
- Harold Stassen, former president of the University of Pennsylvania and former governor of Minnesota
- Nancy Staudt, dean of law at Washington University in St. Louis
- Robert Stein, former dean of the University of Minnesota Law School and former executive director of the American Bar Association
- Michael A. Wolff, dean of the Saint Louis University School of Law and former chief justice of the Supreme Court of Missouri

== Business ==
- James H. Binger, former chief executive officer of Honeywell
- Alden W. Clausen, former president of the World Bank
- Terrance Hanold, former president of the Pillsbury Company
- Stephen F. Keating, former president of the Honeywell
- Leonard Murray, former president of the Soo Line Railroad
- Tim Pawlenty, president of Financial Services Roundtable and former governor of Minnesota
- William John Quinn, former president of the Milwaukee Road
- Irving S. Shapiro, former CEO of DuPont
- Arne Sorenson, CEO of Marriott International
- Michael P. Sullivan, former president of Dairy Queen
- Michael W. Wright, former CEO of Supervalu

== Entertainment ==
- Guy Branum, comedian
- Laura Coates, legal analyst for CNN
- Azhar Usman, standup comic

== Government ==
- Caroline A. Crenshaw, commissioner of the United States Securities and Exchange Commission
- B. Todd Jones, director of the Bureau of Alcohol, Tobacco, Firearms and Explosives (ATF) and chief disciplinary officer of the National Football League
- Roger G. Kennedy, director of the Smithsonian Institution's National Museum of American History and director of the National Park Service
- William K. Naylor, US Army brigadier general

== Judiciary ==
=== Federal ===
- Donald Alsop, federal judge
- Leland Bush, judge of the District Court of Minnesota
- Nancy E. Brasel, federal judge
- Myron Bright, former judge of the U.S. Court of Appeals for the Eighth Circuit
- William Canby, judge of the U.S. Court of Appeals for the Ninth Circuit
- Michael J. Davis, federal judge
- David S. Doty, federal judge
- Henry Norman Graven, former federal judge
- Gerald Heaney, former judge of the U.S. Court of Appeals for the Eighth Circuit
- Richard H. Kyle, federal judge
- Earl R. Larson, former federal judge
- Brett H. Ludwig, federal judge
- George MacKinnon, former judge of the U.S. Court of Appeals for the District of Columbia Circuit
- Harry H. MacLaughlin, former federal judge
- Patrick J. McNulty, former United States Bankruptcy Court judge and WWII fighter pilot
- Ann D. Montgomery, federal judge
- Diana E. Murphy, judge of the U.S. Court of Appeals for the Eighth Circuit
- Philip Neville, former federal judge
- Gunnar Nordbye, former federal judge
- Milton D. Purdy, former federal judge, served on United States Court for China
- James M. Rosenbaum, federal judge
- George F. Sullivan, former federal judge
- John R. Tunheim, federal judge
- Charles Joseph Vogel, former judge of the U.S. Court of Appeals for the Eighth Circuit

=== State ===
- G. Barry Anderson, justice of the Minnesota Supreme Court
- Paul H. Anderson, justice of the Minnesota Supreme Court
- Russell A. Anderson, former Chief Justice of the Minnesota Supreme Court
- Kathleen A. Blatz, former Chief Justice of the Minnesota Supreme Court
- Harrison A. Bronson, former justice of the North Dakota Supreme Court
- Edward T. Burke, former justice of the North Dakota Supreme Court
- Theodore Christianson, former justice of the Minnesota Supreme Court
- Mary Jeanne Coyne, former justice of the Minnesota Supreme Court
- John P. Devaney, former Chief Justice of the Minnesota Supreme Court
- Ralph J. Erickstad, former Chief Justice of the North Dakota Supreme Court
- Joan Ericksen, judge of the U .S. District Court for the District of Minnesota
- Paul Feinman, judge of the New York Court of Appeals
- Frank T. Gallagher, former justice of the Minnesota Supreme Court
- Thomas F. Gallagher, former justice of the Minnesota Supreme Court
- Sandra Gardebring Ogren, former justice of the Minnesota Supreme Court
- James H. Gilbert, former justice of the Minnesota Supreme Court
- Thomas Eugene Grady, former justice of the Washington Supreme Court
- Natalie Hudson, justice of the Minnesota Supreme Court
- Fallon Kelly, former justice of the Minnesota Supreme Court
- Janine Kern, justice of the South Dakota Supreme Court
- Oscar Knutson, former chief justice of Minnesota Supreme Court
- Joan Ericksen Lancaster, former justice of the Minnesota Supreme Court
- Ernest W. Lewis, former justice of the Arizona Supreme Court
- Lee Loevinger, former justice of the Minnesota Supreme Court
- Charles Loring, former chief justice of the Minnesota Supreme Court
- Leroy E. Matson, former justice of the Minnesota Supreme Court
- Julius J. Olson, former justice of the Minnesota Supreme Court
- James C. Otis, former justice of the Minnesota Supreme Court
- Alan Page, justice of the Minnesota Supreme Court and Pro Football Hall of Famer
- Harry H. Peterson, justice of the Minnesota Supreme Court and former Minnesota attorney general
- Walter F. Rogosheske, former justice of the Minnesota Supreme Court
- Robert Sheran, former chief justice of the Minnesota Supreme Court
- John E. Simonett, former justice of the Minnesota Supreme Court
- Leslie Stein, judge of the New York Court of Appeals
- Royal A. Stone, former justice of the Minnesota Supreme Court (did not graduate)
- Thomas O. Streissguth, former justice of the Minnesota Supreme Court
- Edward C. Stringer, former justice of the Minnesota Supreme Court
- John J. Todd, former justice of the Minnesota Supreme Court
- Samuel B. Wilson, former justice of the Minnesota Supreme Court
- Michael A. Wolff, former chief justice of the Supreme Court of Missouri and dean of Saint Louis University School of Law
- Lawrence R. Yetka, former justice of the Minnesota Supreme Court
- Theodora Gaïtas, Associate Justice, Minnesota Supreme Court; former Minnesota Court of Appeals and Minnesota District Court Judge
- Robert W. Phelan, Superior Court Justice of the State of New Jersey, Monmouth Vicinage

== Law ==
=== Attorney General ===
- Henry N. Benson, former Minnesota Attorney General
- Keith Ellison, Minnesota Attorney General and the first Muslim elected to the United States Congress
- William S. Ervin, former Attorney General of Minnesota
- Mike Hatch, former Minnesota Attorney General
- Douglas M. Head, former Minnesota Attorney General
- Hubert "Skip" Humphrey, former Minnesota Attorney General and Minnesota State Senator
- Henry Linde, former North Dakota Attorney General
- Miles Lord, former Minnesota Attorney General and U.S. District Court Judge
- Robert W. Mattson, Sr., former Minnesota Attorney General
- William D. Mitchell, former Attorney General of the United States
- Byron S. Payne, South Dakota Attorney General
- Byron S. Payne, former Attorney General of South Dakota
- Harry H. Peterson, former Minnesota attorney general and justice of the Minnesota Supreme Court
- Albert F. Pratt, former Minnesota Attorney General and member of Minnesota House of Representatives
- Warren Spannaus, former Minnesota Attorney General
- Leo A. Temmey, former Attorney General of South Dakota

=== U.S. Attorney ===
- Thomas B. Heffelfinger, former U.S. Attorney for Minnesota

=== Private practice ===
- David R. Brink, former president of the American Bar Association
- Michael Ciresi, trial lawyer
- Frank Claybourne, president of the Minnesota State Bar Association (1979–1980) and general counsel of the Republican Party of Minnesota (1950–1974)
- Norris Darrell, former president of the American Law Institute
- Melvin Steen, founding partner of Cleary Gottlieb Steen & Hamilton
- McCants Stewart, first African American LL.M. recipient and first African American lawyer in Oregon

== Literature and journalism ==
- Marshall Houts, author
- Scott W. Johnson, conservative blogger
- Katherine Kersten, conservative columnist
- Allan Ryan, Director of Intellectual Property at Harvard Business School Publishing, Harvard University

== Politics ==
- Ellen Anderson, Minnesota State Senator
- Wendell Anderson, former Governor of Minnesota and United States Senator
- LaRoy Baird, North Dakota State Senator
- Jack Baker, GLBT activist, the first couple to apply for a same-sex marriage license in 1970
- Dean Barkley, former United States Senator
- James J. Blanchard, former Governor of Michigan and U.S. Ambassador to Canada
- Quentin N. Burdick, U.S. House of Representatives and former United States Senator
- Usher L. Burdick, former United States Representative and Lieutenant Governor of North Dakota
- J. A. A. Burnquist, former governor of Minnesota
- Harlan J. Bushfield, former Governor of South Dakota and United States Senator
- Phil Carruthers, former Speaker of the Minnesota House of Representatives
- Ray P. Chase, former United States Congressman (did not graduate)
- Satveer Chaudhary, former Minnesota State Senator
- Theodore Christianson, former governor of Minnesota and United States Congressman
- Frederick A. Cina, Minnesota state representative
- Lawrence D. Cohen, former mayor of Saint Paul, Minnesota
- Chris Coleman, Mayor of Saint Paul, Minnesota
- Charles M. Dale, former Governor of New Hampshire
- Scott H. DeLisi, United States Ambassador to Nepal
- Everett Dirksen, former United States Senator (did not graduate)
- David Durenberger, former United States Senator
- Judi Dutcher, former Minnesota State Auditor
- Keith Ellison, first Muslim elected to the United States Congress and Minnesota Attorney General
- Franklin Ellsworth, former United States Representative
- Matt Entenza, former Minnesota House Minority Leader
- Donald M. Fraser, former United States Congressman and mayor of Minneapolis
- Orville Freeman, former governor of Minnesota
- Godfrey G. Goodwin, former United States Representative
- Samuel D. Heins, United States Ambassador to Norway
- Einar Hoidale, former United States Congressman
- Melissa Hortman, Minnesota State Representative
- Hubert "Skip" Humphrey, Minnesota State Senator and Minnesota Attorney General
- Sly James, mayor of Kansas City, Missouri
- Samuel L. Kaplan, United States Ambassador to Morocco
- Ron Kind, United States Congressman
- Thomas E. Latimer, former mayor of Minneapolis, Minnesota
- George E. Leach, former mayor of Minneapolis, Minnesota
- Harold LeVander, former governor of Minnesota
- John Lind, former governor of Minnesota
- Ernest Lundeen, former United States Senator
- William Paul Luther, former United States Congressman
- Tom McDonald, former U.S. Ambassador to Zimbabwe
- Clark MacGregor, former United States Representative
- James Manahan, former United States Representative
- Carlos Mariani, Minnesota State Representative (did not graduate)
- Edmon Marukyan, member of the National Assembly of Armenia
- J. E. Meyers, former mayor of Minneapolis, Minnesota
- Geoff Michel, Minnesota State Senator
- Clarence B. Miller, former United States Representative
- Richard Moe, chief of staff to the vice president and former president, National Trust for Historic Preservation
- Walter Mondale, former Vice President of the United States and United States Ambassador to Japan
- Wayne Morse, former United States Senator
- Mee Moua, former Minnesota State Senator
- Joe Mullery, Minnesota State Representative
- Constance Berry Newman, former United States Assistant Secretary of State for African Affairs
- Walter Newton, former United States Representative
- Dave Olin, former Minnesota State Representative
- Mabeth Hurd Paige, one of the first four-woman elected to the Minnesota Legislature in 1923
- Mary Pawlenty, former First Lady of Minnesota and former judge
- Tim Pawlenty, former Governor of Minnesota.
- Albert F. Pratt, former Minnesota Attorney General and member of Minnesota House of Representatives
- J. A. O. Preus, former governor of Minnesota
- A. J. Rockne, former Speaker of the Minnesota House of Representatives and longest-serving member
- Christian Rosenmeier, former Minnesota State Senator
- A. J. Rosier, Wyoming state senator
- Edward Rustad, former Minnesota State Senator
- Elmer Ryan, former United States Representative
- Harry A. Sieben, former Speaker of the Minnesota House of Representatives
- Gerald Edward Sikorski, former United States Congressman
- Steve Simon, Minnesota State Representative
- Theodor S. Slen, former Minnesota State Representative
- George Ross Smith, former United States Representative
- Harold Stassen, former governor of Minnesota and former president of the University of Pennsylvania
- Dave Thompson, Minnesota State Senator
- Bruce Marion Van Sickle, former federal judge, member of North Dakota House of Representatives
- William W. Ward, former member of the Wisconsin State Assembly
- Charlie Weaver, Jr., former Minnesota state representative and the governor's Chief of Staff
- John Francis Wheaton, first African American graduate and the first African American member of the Minnesota Legislature
- Benson Whitney, former United States Ambassador to Norway
- Ryan Winkler, Minnesota State Representative
- Sandra Casber Wise, former First Lady of West Virginia
- George M. Young, former United States Representative
- Will Stancil, Minnesota House of Representatives candidate

== Sports ==
- B. Todd Jones, Chief Disciplinary Officer, National Football League, former director of the Bureau of Alcohol, Tobacco, Firearms and Explosives (ATF)
- Alan Page, Pro Football Hall of Famer and justice of the Minnesota Supreme Court
- Greg Raymer, 2004 World Series of Poker Champion
- Ballard Smith, former president, San Diego Padres
- Nick Thompson, MMA Fighter
