= Polsby =

Polsby is a surname. Notable people with the surname include:

- Daniel D. Polsby (born 1945), American legal scholar
- Nelson W. Polsby (1934–2007), American political scientist

== See also ==
- Polsby–Popper test, a mathematical compactness measure
