= Ninetieth Minnesota State Senate v. Dayton =

2017 Minnesota Supreme Court case

- Court: Minnesota Supreme Court
- Full case name: The Ninetieth Minnesota State Senate, The Ninetieth Minnesota State House of Representatives v. Mark B. Dayton, In his official capacity as Governor of the State of Minnesota, Myron Frans, In his official capacity as Commissioner of the Minnesota Department of Management and Budget
- Decided: November 16, 2017
- Citation: Case no. 62-CV-17-3601 903 N.W.2d 609

Case history
- Appealed from: Ramsey County District Court

Court membership
- Judges sitting: Chief Justice Lorie Skjerven Gildea, Barry Anderson, David Lillehaug, Natalie Hudson, Margaret Chutich, Anne McKeig

Case opinions
- Decision by: Lorie Skjerven Gildea
- Dissent: Barry Anderson

The Ninetieth Minnesota State Senate v. Dayton, (903 N.W.2d 609), was a 2017 Minnesota Supreme Court case where the Court ruled that Governor Mark Dayton's line item vetoes of appropriations for the Minnesota Senate and Minnesota House of Representatives were a lawful exercise of his authority granted by the Minnesota Constitution. The Court also ruled that since the state legislature had access to other funding to continue operating as a fully functioning and independent branch of government, the governor's vetoes did not effectively abolish the legislature and thereby violate Article III of the state constitution. The Court also ruled that the judicial branch did not have the constitutional authority to order funding without a corresponding budgetary appropriation. The Supreme Court's ruling overturned an earlier ruling by a Ramsey County District Court judge. The case marked the first time in which the Minnesota Supreme Court was asked to resolve a lawsuit brought by one branch of government against another.

== Background ==
The Minnesota Legislature adjourned its regular session in 2017 on May 22 with a significant amount of unfinished business; it had failed to pass any omnibus spending bills establishing the state's budget for the next two years. Legislative leaders came to an agreement with Governor Mark Dayton to call a special session immediately following the adjournment of the regular session to address this unfinished business. Just before the conclusion of the special session, the legislature passed a series of appropriations bills for the state's budget. After the four-day special session had adjourned on May 26, Dayton allowed the bills to become law, but vetoed line item appropriations funding the legislature.

Dayton issued a letter explaining his vetoes; he sought to avoid a government shutdown while convincing legislative leaders to renegotiate provisions of the budgetary bills. This conflict represented one instance of a lengthy dispute between Dayton, of the Democratic–Farmer–Labor Party (DFL), and the Republican-led Legislature over the scope of the state government. Among the budgetary bills was a bill containing a package of tax cuts totaling $650 million that Dayton opposed. However, the bill was worded in such a way that if Dayton had vetoed it, the Minnesota Department of Revenue would have been defunded—a situation that he wished to avoid. Legislative leaders refused to negotiate and sued Dayton, arguing that his vetoes had the unconstitutional effect of abolishing the legislature.

== Lower court ruling ==
In late June, prior to making a final ruling on the case, Ramsey County District Court Chief Judge John Guthmann issued a temporary order that the legislature continue to be funded at previous levels through October 1. (The Legislature's funding had been set to expire on June 30 with the end of the state's fiscal year.) On July 19, Chief Judge Guthmann ruled that Dayton's vetoes were unconstitutional in that they violated the Minnesota Constitution's Separation of Powers clause by effectively abolishing the legislature. Guthmann indicated that a main reason that Dayton's vetoes were problematic was that he did not actually object to the appropriations themselves; the purpose of the vetoes was to convince legislators to renegotiate other appropriations and policies unrelated to the legislature's funding. Upon news of the ruling, Dayton immediately indicated his intent to appeal the decision.

== Ruling of the Supreme Court ==
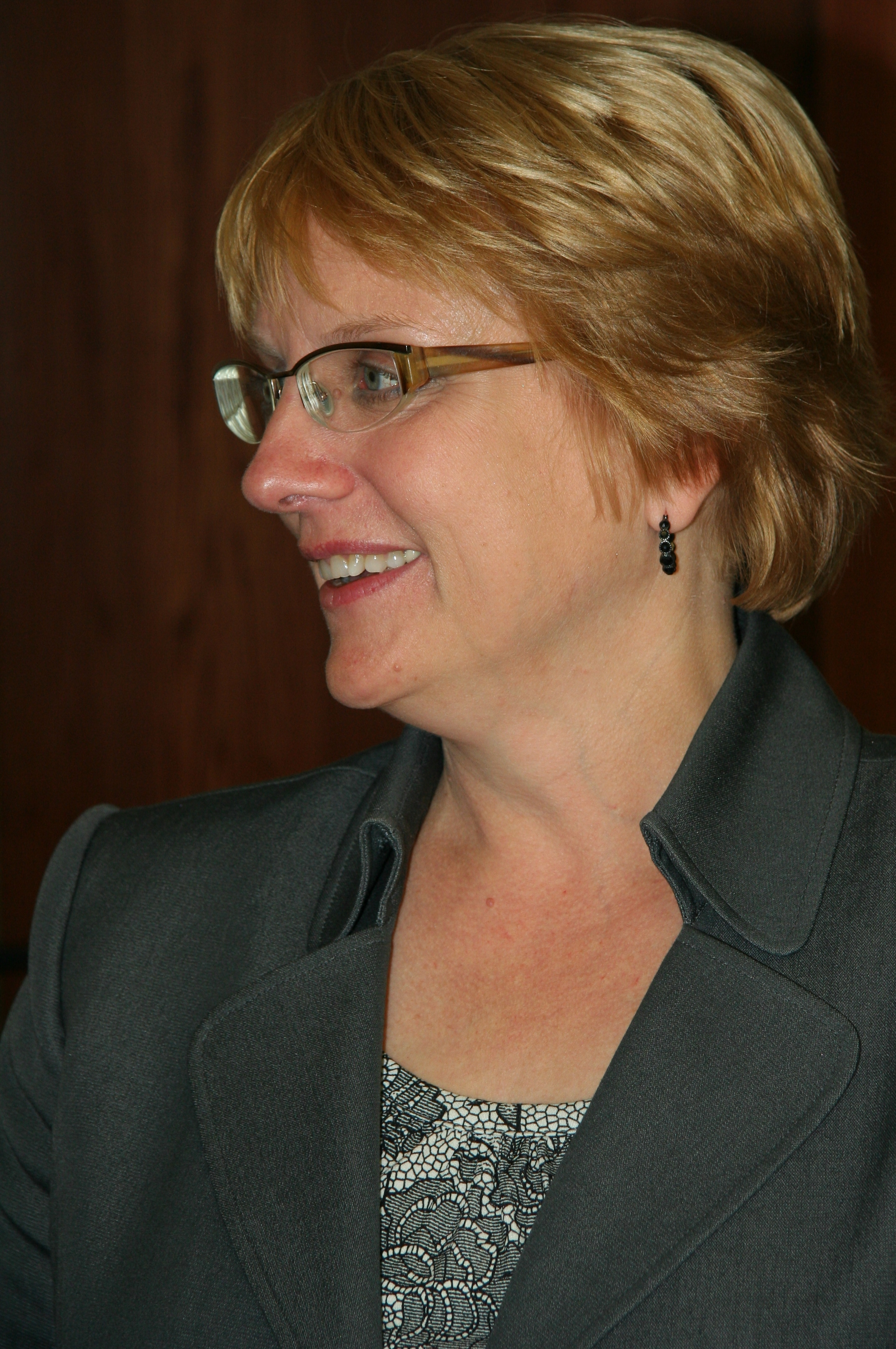
In a majority opinion, Chief Justice Lorie Skjerven Gildea stated that Dayton's actions were within his constitutional authority as governor.

On September 9, the Minnesota Supreme Court made a preliminary ruling that when Dayton vetoed appropriations for the legislature, he did not violate his constitutional authority to make line item vetoes for budgetary appropriations. The Court also ordered the parties into talks with a mediator. It also strongly encouraged the parties to find a political solution to resolve this dispute. The Court did not remand the case back to the lower Ramsey County court, thereby giving it the ability to make a further ruling if the attempts at mediation were unsuccessful.

Both parties met with mediator Rick Solum over the course of two days (September 21 and 22), but he determined that the legislative leaders and Dayton had irreconcilable differences and that their impasse could not be overcome without a further ruling by the Court. Following the impasse, Dayton claimed that legislative leaders had "lied to" Minnesotans and the Supreme Court about the legislature's ability to finance its operations until the start of the upcoming legislative session to begin in February 2018. One week later, the Supreme Court ordered legislative leaders to submit a full report of their current financial situation regarding funding on hand and their ability to continue to function.

On November 16, the Court issued its final ruling and upheld Dayton's vetoes. The Court also stated that the legislature had access to sufficient funding to continue to exist until the beginning of the next legislative session; consequently, Dayton's actions remained within his constitutional authority. The Court's ruling was issued by a 5–1 majority; Justice Barry Anderson dissented, and Justice David Stras recused himself from the case. Additionally, in the Court's ruling, Chief Justice Lorie Skjerven Gildea stated that the judicial branch had no authority to appropriate funding without a legislative counterpart. The Court declined to take a stance on the matter of whether Dayton's veto of the legislative funding was coercive; the Court determined that the legislature would be able to continue to operate until the next legislative session.

In the majority ruling for the Court, Chief Justice Gildea acknowledged the unprecedented nature of the case saying, "For the first time in Minnesota history, we are asked to resolve a lawsuit brought by one of our coordinate branches of government—the Legislative Branch—against our other coordinate branch of government—the Executive Branch." Since the governor's line item veto power was established in 1876, the case was only the sixth instance of litigation involving the power in Minnesota history and only the third instance in which such litigation reached the Minnesota Supreme Court.

== Reactions to the ruling and aftermath ==
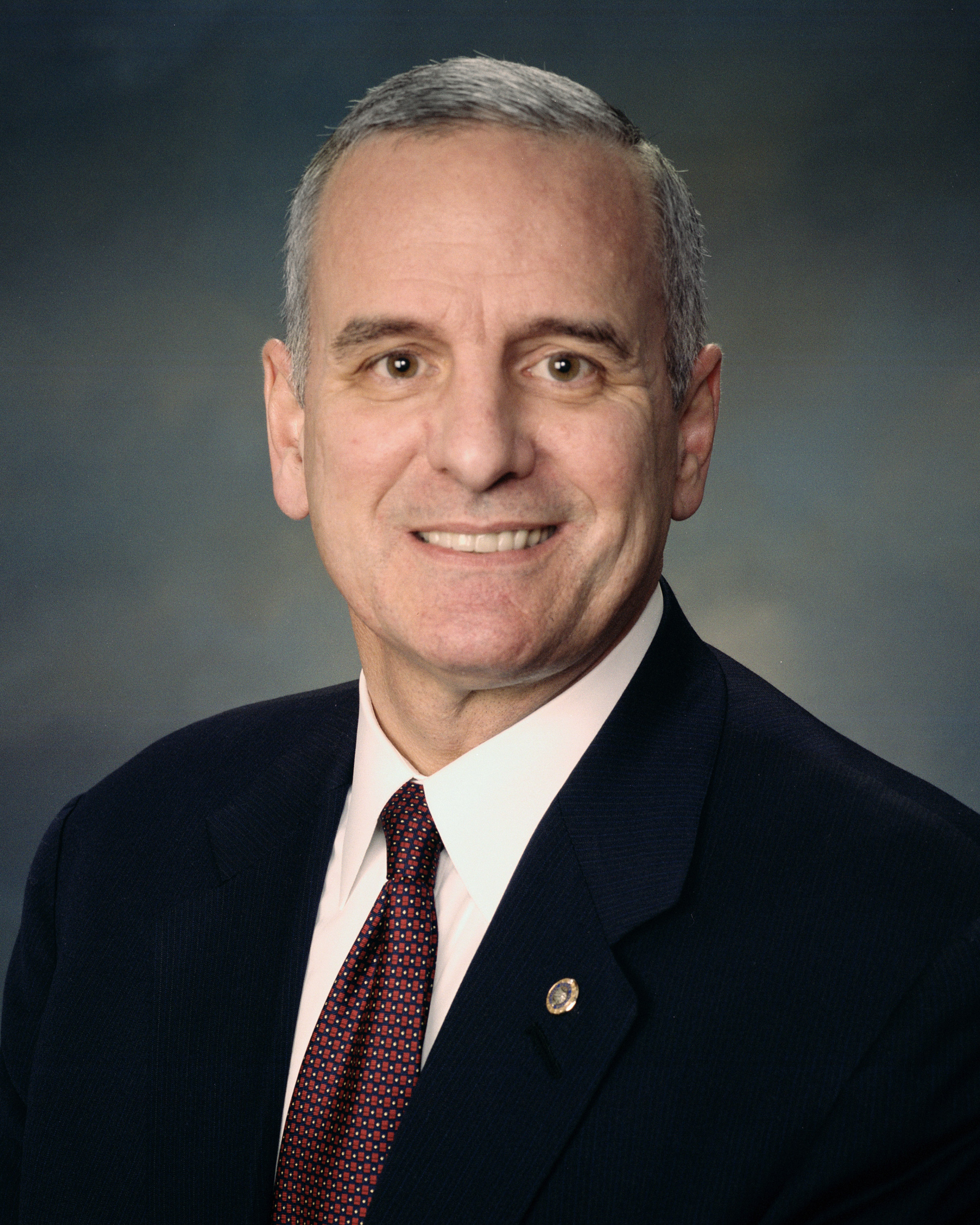
Minnesota Governor Mark Dayton

Governor Mark Dayton applauded the Supreme Court's ruling and cast blame on Republican legislative leaders for initiating the lengthy and expensive legal dispute. The final costs of legal fees borne by Minnesota taxpayers totaled $768,000. Republican Speaker of the House Kurt Daudt disputed suggestions that the Court’s ruling was a winning proposition for Governor Dayton; he saw the matter as unsettled. Paul Gazelka, the Senate Majority Leader, expressed dismay at the news of the Court’s ruling, saying that the legislature would be forced to take extreme measures to keep itself funded, and suggested that this put the legislature and the State of Minnesota in a precarious situation. Daudt said that this unprecedented financial situation put the Senate at risk of defaulting on scheduled debt payments for the Senate’s office building.

Following the Supreme Court ruling, the Minnesota Legislative Coordinating Commission (LCC)—a bipartisan group of leaders from both houses of the Legislature—agreed to provide the Legislature with $20 million from its carry-over funds and 2019 appropriations to continue regular operations until the beginning of the next regular session. These funds supplemented cash reserves from the House and Senate as well as temporary funding approved by the District Court. After the legislature reconvened its regular session in 2018, it voted to restore the funding which Dayton had vetoed. On February 26, Dayton signed the bill into law. In addition to reinstating funding for the legislature, the bill provided for the LCC to have its payments to the Legislature reimbursed. Although Standard & Poor's had "put a 'negative' watch" on the state's otherwise high credit rating while this case proceeded through the courts, the company ultimately upgraded the state's credit rating to AAA in July 2018, after the case and the Legislature's funding uncertainties were resolved.

The Associated Press described the Supreme Court ruling as "a major legal victory" for Dayton, and the ruling definitively established the governor's power to exercise the line item veto power for any purpose. The legislature prevailed from a policy perspective, however, as none of the changes to tax policy that Dayton sought were legally enacted. The Legislature's session in 2018 was marked by continued discord between the Republican and DFL parties; many of the most significant bills from the session were ultimately vetoed by Dayton, including bills regarding tax reforms and further budgetary appropriations. Pursuant to the results of the 2018 Minnesota elections, Minnesotans elected a new governor from the DFL party and installed a DFL majority in the House of Representatives; the Republican party maintained a narrow majority in the Senate.
