= Compactness (disambiguation) =

Compactness can refer to:

- Compact space, in topology
- Compact operator, in functional analysis
- Compactness theorem, in first-order logic
- Compactness measure of a shape, a numerical quantity representing the degree to which a shape is compact
