= Gellhorn =

Gellhorn is a surname. Notable people with this surname include:

- Edna Fischel Gellhorn (1878–1970), American suffragist, mother of Martha Gellhorn
- Ernest Gellhorn (1935–2005), American academic and legal scholar
- Martha Gellhorn (1908–1998), American novelist, travel writer, journalist, war correspondent
- Peter Gellhorn (1912–2004), German conductor, composer, pianist and teacher who made a career in Britain

== See also ==
- Hemingway & Gellhorn (2012), HBO film about the lives of journalist Martha Gellhorn and her husband, writer Ernest Hemingway
- Martha Gellhorn Prize for Journalism, named for war correspondent Martha Gellhorn, established in 1999 by the Martha Gellhorn Trust
- Raymond Gellhorn, unscrupulous businessman character in the science fiction short story Sally by Isaac Asimov
