= Eric Magnusson =

Eric Magnusson may refer to:

- Erik Magnusson (duke) (1282–1318), Swedish prince
- Erik Magnusson, King of Sweden (1339–1359), co-ruler with his father in 1356–1359
- Eric II of Norway (1268–1299), king of Norway 1280-1299

== See also ==
- Erik Magnuson (football player)
- Eric J. Magnuson (lawyer)
