= Florida's congressional districts =

U.S. House districts in the state of Florida

Florida's congressional district boundaries (Plan EOGPCRP2026), in effect for the 2026 elections Interactive map version

Florida is divided into 28 congressional districts, each represented by a member of the United States House of Representatives. After the 2020 United States census, Florida gained one seat, increasing from 27 to 28 districts.

The current congressional district boundaries (Plan EOGPCRP2026) were passed by the Florida Legislature on April 29, 2026, and signed into law by Governor Ron DeSantis on May 4, 2026. On June 10, 2026, the Supreme Court of Florida allowed the map to remain in effect for the 2026 elections. These districts are the ones in use for the 2026 United States House of Representatives elections in Florida.

== Current districts and representatives ==
This is a list of the United States representatives from Florida. The current members were elected under the prior (2023–2026) map. New members will be elected in November 2026 under the current (EOGPCRP2026) boundaries and take office in January 2027.

Republicans have complete control of the congressional redistricting process in Florida, as any new maps are drawn and passed by the Republican-held state legislature and signed into law by the Republican governor. This has resulted in Florida's maps being an "extreme" partisan gerrymander in favor of the Republican Party, with few competitive districts. Despite challenges from groups such as the NAACP and Common Cause, the current map was upheld by a panel of judges from the United States District Court for the Northern District of Florida, which found that, while a partisan gerrymander, there was not sufficient evidence that the maps are a racial gerrymander. While the map is a gerrymander, it is relatively compact, with a Reock score of 0.4639.

The delegation has 28 seats.

Current U.S. representatives from Florida
District	Member (Residence)	Party	Incumbent since	CPVI	District map
1st	Jimmy Patronis (Fort Walton Beach)	Republican	April 2, 2025	R+18	
2nd	Neal Dunn (Panama City)	Republican	January 3, 2017	R+8	
3rd	Kat Cammack (Gainesville)	Republican	January 3, 2021	R+10	
4th	Aaron Bean (Fernandina Beach)	Republican	January 3, 2023	R+5	
5th	John Rutherford (Jacksonville)	Republican	January 3, 2017	R+10	
6th	Randy Fine (Melbourne Beach)	Republican	April 2, 2025	R+14	
7th	Cory Mills (New Smyrna Beach)	Republican	January 3, 2023	R+5	
8th	Mike Haridopolos (Indian Harbour Beach)	Republican	January 3, 2025	R+8	
9th	Darren Soto (Kissimmee)	Democratic	January 3, 2017	R+8	
10th	Maxwell Frost (Orlando)	Democratic	January 3, 2023	D+13	
11th	Daniel Webster (Clermont)	Republican	January 3, 2011	R+7	
12th	Gus Bilirakis (Palm Harbor)	Republican	January 3, 2007	R+7	
13th	Anna Paulina Luna (St. Petersburg)	Republican	January 3, 2023	R+6	
14th	Kathy Castor (Tampa)	Democratic	January 3, 2007	R+4	
15th	Laurel Lee (Tampa)	Republican	January 3, 2023	R+9	
16th	Vern Buchanan (Sarasota)	Republican	January 3, 2007	R+6	
17th	Greg Steube (Sarasota)	Republican	January 3, 2019	R+10	
18th	Scott Franklin (Lakeland)	Republican	January 3, 2021	R+8	
19th	Byron Donalds (Naples)	Republican	January 3, 2021	R+14	
20th	Vacant		April 21, 2026	D+20	
21st	Brian Mast (Fort Pierce)	Republican	January 3, 2017	R+7	
22nd	Lois Frankel (West Palm Beach)	Democratic	January 3, 2013	R+4	
23rd	Jared Moskowitz (Parkland)	Democratic	January 3, 2023	D+9	
24th	Frederica Wilson (Miami Gardens)	Democratic	January 3, 2011	D+22	
25th	Debbie Wasserman Schultz (Weston)	Democratic	January 3, 2005	R+3	
26th	Mario Díaz-Balart (Miami)	Republican	January 3, 2003	R+7	
27th	María Elvira Salazar (Miami)	Republican	January 3, 2021	R+6	
28th	Carlos A. Giménez (Miami)	Republican	January 3, 2021	R+10	

== Historical district boundaries ==
Districts circa 1894

Districts from 2003 to 2013

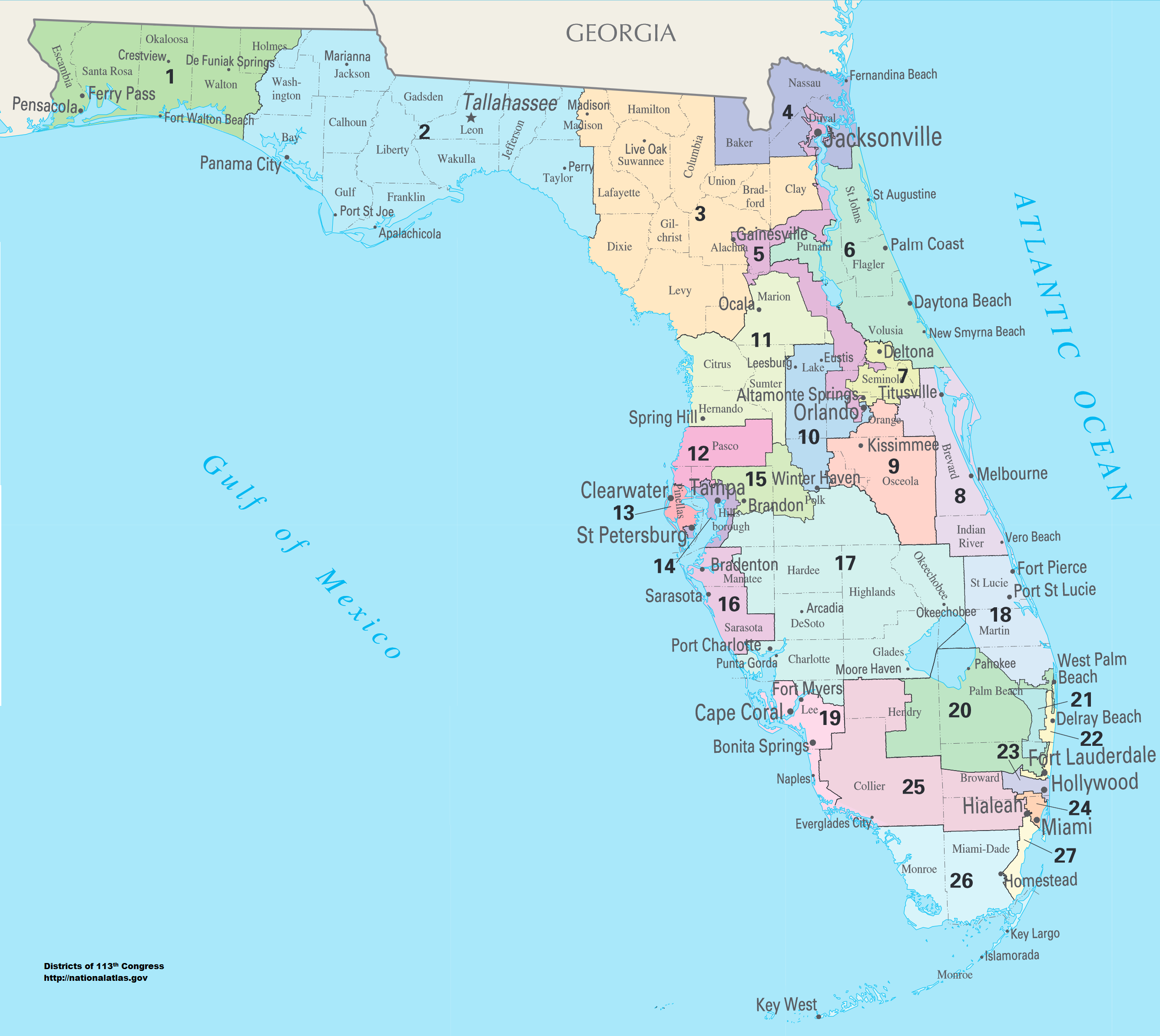
Districts from 2013 to 2017

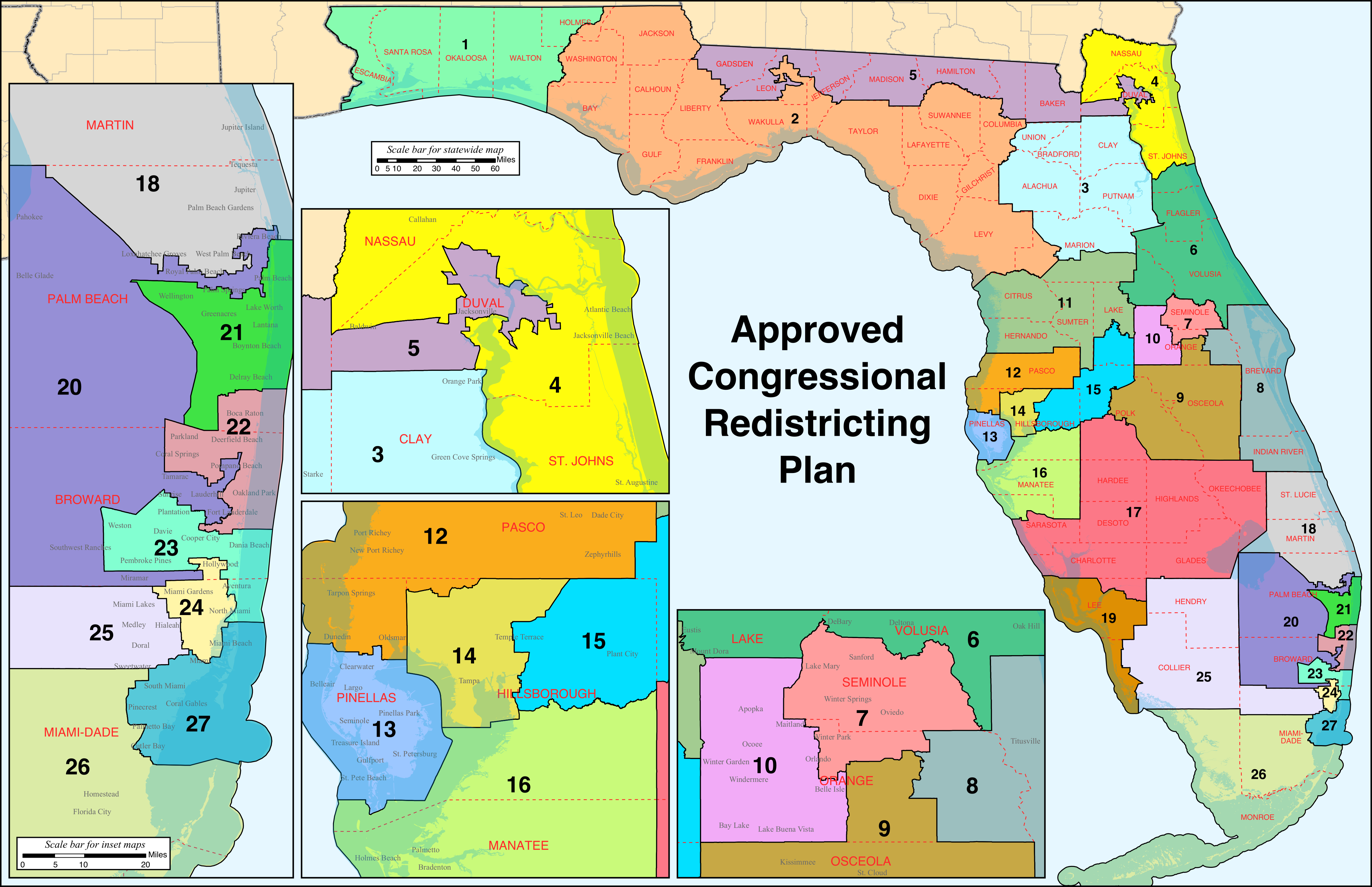
Districts from 2017 to 2023

Districts from 2023 to 2026

=== Obsolete districts ===
- Florida's at-large congressional district
- Florida Territory's at-large congressional district

== History ==
=== 2010 redistricting ===
In 2010, Florida voters approved Amendments 5 and 6 (the Fair Districts Amendments). The legislature adopted new districts in 2012. Litigation followed, and the Florida Supreme Court ordered changes that took effect for the 2016 elections.

=== 2020 redistricting ===
Following the 2020 census, Florida gained one seat. The congressional map adopted in 2022 was used for the 2022 and 2024 elections.

=== 2026 redistricting ===
In 2026 the Florida Legislature passed a new congressional map (Plan EOGPCRP2026 / HB 1-D) on April 29. Governor DeSantis signed it on May 4, 2026. The Florida Supreme Court on June 10, 2026, declined to block the map, allowing it to be used for the 2026 elections. Districts 1–7 were largely unchanged; most other districts were redrawn.

== See also ==
- List of United States congressional districts
