= Hanold =

Hanold is a surname. Notable people with the surname include:

- Marilyn Hanold (born 1938), American model and actress
- Maylon Hanold (born 1963), American slalom canoeist
- Terrance Hanold (1912–1996), American lawyer and food industry executive

== See also ==
- Harold (surname)
