= American Academy of Appellate Lawyers =

- Formation: December 0, 1990; 36 years ago
- Type: Nonprofit organization
- Purpose: Appellate law
- Headquarters: 1300 Piccard Dr # L114, Rockville MD 20850-4303
- Location: Rockville MD
- President: Dan Polsenberg
- Website: https://www.appellateacademy.org/

The American Academy of Appellate Lawyers is a non-profit organization consisting of the Fellows who have been elected to the academy. It was founded in 1990 and incorporated as a 501(c)(3) in 1991. Its mission is to "advance the highest standards and practices of appellate advocacy and to recognize outstanding appellate lawyers."

Attorneys elected as Academy Fellows must have at least 15 years of practice experience in appellate law and a reputation for the "highest excellence in appellate work." Membership is limited to only 500 members in the United States. The activities of the academy are supported by the dues and initiation fees paid by the Fellows, and include biannual meetings. The organization's headquarters are in Rockville, Maryland.

== Members ==
- Robert D. Durham, Justice of the Oregon Supreme Court
- Timothy B. Dyk, U.S. Court of Appeals for the Federal Circuit
- Paul L. Friedman, U.S. District Court for the District of Columbia
- Tom Godwin, private practice
- Eric J. Magnuson, Chief Justice of the Minnesota Supreme Court
- Kevin Martin, private practice
- John G. Roberts, Jr., Chief Justice of the United States
- Donald Capparella; Dodson, Parker, Behm, and Capparella, PC,; Nashville, TN

== See also ==
- California Academy of Appellate Lawyers
