= Plummer, Minnesota =

City in Minnesota, United States

Plummer
- City
- Location of Plummer, Minnesota
- Coordinates: 47°54′42″N 96°2′33″W
- Country: United States
- State: Minnesota
- County: Red Lake

Area
  - Total: 2.67 sq mi (6.92 km^{2})
  - Land: 2.67 sq mi (6.92 km^{2})
  - Water: 0 sq mi (0.00 km^{2})
- Elevation: 1,125 ft (343 m)

Population (2020)
  - Total: 276
  - Density: 103.3/sq mi (39.89/km^{2})
- Time zone: UTC-6 (Central (CST))
  - Summer (DST): UTC-5 (CDT)
- ZIP code: 56748
- Area code: 218
- FIPS code: 27-51712
- GNIS feature ID: 0649597

Plummer is a city in Red Lake County, Minnesota, United States. The population was 276 at the 2020 census.

== History ==
A post office called Plummer has been in operation since 1903. The city was named for Charles A. Plummer, who established two mills near the original town site.

== Geography ==
According to the United States Census Bureau, the city has a total area of 2.80 square miles (7.25 km^{2}), all land.

== Demographics ==
Presidential election results

Precinct General Election Results
Year	Republican	Democratic	Third parties
2020	68.2% 88	31.0% 40	0.8% 1
2016	65.3% 66	25.7% 26	9.0% 9
2012	45.7% 53	48.3% 56	6.0% 7
2008	39.6% 53	56.0% 75	4.4% 6
2004	46.8% 74	47.5% 75	5.7% 9
2000	48.6% 69	42.3% 60	9.1% 13
1996	41.7% 53	47.2 60	11.1% 14
1992	27.1% 42	47.7% 74	25.2% 39
1988	46.9% 69	49.0% 72	4.1% 6
1984	45.3% 78	52.3% 90	2.3% 4
1980	35.0% 70	58.0% 116	7.0% 14
1976	29.0% 51	62.5% 110	8.5% 15
1968	45.5% 61	48.5% 65	6.0% 8
1964	24.5% 35	73.4% 105	2.1% 3
1960	36.7% 54	60.5% 89	2.8% 4

Historical population
Census	Pop.	Note	%±
1910	139		—
1920	252		81.3%
1930	279		10.7%
1940	312		11.8%
1950	340		9.0%
1960	283		−16.8%
1970	285		0.7%
1980	353		23.9%
1990	277		−21.5%
2000	270		−2.5%
2010	292		8.1%
2020	276		−5.5%
U.S. Decennial Census; 2020 Census

=== 2010 census ===
As of the census of 2010, there were 292 people, 128 households, and 68 families residing in the city. The population density was 104.3 inhabitants per square mile (40.3/km^{2}). There were 141 housing units at an average density of 50.4 per square mile (19.5/km^{2}). The racial makeup of the city was 96.2% White, 1.7% Native American, and 2.1% from two or more races. Hispanic or Latino of any race were 3.1% of the population.

There were 128 households, of which 30.5% had children under the age of 18 living with them, 43.8% were married couples living together, 7.8% had a female householder with no husband present, 1.6% had a male householder with no wife present, and 46.9% were non-families. 39.8% of all households were made up of individuals, and 11% had someone living alone who was 65 years of age or older. The average household size was 2.28 and the average family size was 3.18.

The median age in the city was 35 years. 28.4% of residents were under the age of 18; 4% were between the ages of 18 and 24; 31.6% were from 25 to 44; 24.7% were from 45 to 64; and 11.3% were 65 years of age or older. The gender makeup of the city was 51.7% male and 48.3% female.

=== 2000 census ===
At the 2000 census, there were 270 people, 125 households and 71 families in the city. The population density was 95.3 inhabitants per square mile (36.8/km^{2}). There were 130 housing units at an average density of 45.9 per square mile (17.7/km^{2}). The racial makeup of the city was 98.89% White, 0.74% African American and 0.37% Native American.

There were 125 households, of which 23.2% had children under the age of 18 living with them, 48.0% were married couples living together, 7.2% had a female householder with no husband present, and 42.4% were non-families. 37.6% of all households were made up of individuals, and 23.2% had someone living alone who was 65 years of age or older. The average household size was 2.16 and the average family size was 2.89.

The age distribution was 22.6% under the age of 18, 8.1% from 18 to 24, 24.4% from 25 to 44, 21.9% from 45 to 64, and 23.0% who were 65 years of age or older. The median age was 42 years. For every 100 females, there were 88.8 males. For every 100 females age 18 and over, there were 90.0 males.

The median household income was $29,286, and the median family income was $43,438. Males had a median income of $27,500 versus $23,906 for females. The per capita income for the city was $17,506. About 1.6% of families and 8.5% of the population were below the poverty line, including none of those under the age of eighteen and 17.6% of those 65 or over.

== Notable person ==
- Lorie Skjerven Gildea, Former Chief Justice of the Minnesota Supreme Court.
