= Minnesota Law Review =

- Discipline: Law review
- Language: English
- Edited by: Phillip de Sa e Silva (Vol. 108)

Publication details
- History: 1917–present
- Publisher: University of Minnesota Law School (United States)
- Frequency: Bimonthly

Standard abbreviations
- Bluebook: Minn. L. Rev.
- ISO 4: Minn. Law Rev.

Indexing
- ISSN: 0026-5535
- LCCN: 18014798
- OCLC no.: 1758198

Links
- Journal homepage

The Minnesota Law Review is a student-run law review published by students at University of Minnesota Law School. The journal is published six times a year in November, December, February, April, May, and June. It was established by Henry J. Fletcher and William Reynolds Vance in 1917.

The journal contains articles, essays, features, and book reviews by legal scholars as well as student-written notes. The journal has an online companion called Headnotes. Additionally, the journal maintains a blog called De Novo.

In 2021, the journal selected its first Black Editor-in-Chief, Brandie Burris.

== Noted alumni ==
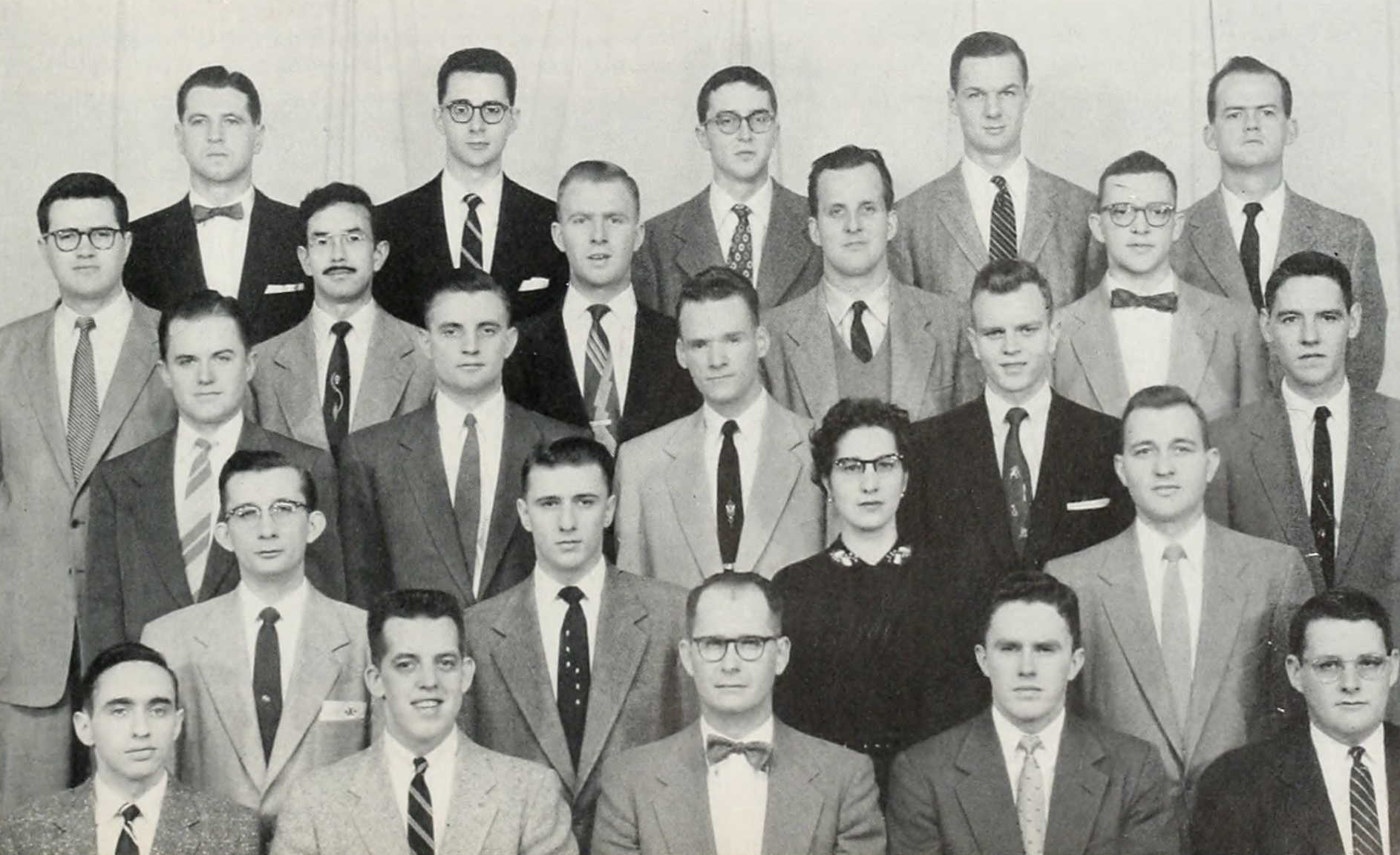
Future Vice President Walter Mondale (middle row, second from left) and other staff members of the Minnesota Law Review, 1955

The Minnesota Law Review's alumni include William C. Canby, Jr., Frank Claybourne, Donald M. Fraser, Orville Freeman, Bill Luther, George MacKinnon, Walter Mondale, Diana E. Murphy, William Prosser, Ernest Gellhorn, Richard Maxwell, John Sargent Pillsbury, Jr., Maynard Pirsig, Daniel D. Polsby, Robert Kingsley, and Harold Stassen. Other alumni include judges Donald Alsop, David S. Doty, Richard H. Kyle, John R. Tunheim, and Nancy E. Brasel, all of the United States District Court for the District of Minnesota; Phil Carruthers, former speaker of the Minnesota House of Representatives; former New Hampshire Governor Charles M. Dale; and Robert Stein, former executive director of the American Bar Association.

== Admissions ==
The law review accepts new members through an annual petitioning process. The petition includes two components: a case comment and a bluebooking portion. Candidates are then evaluated based on their petition, grades, and a personal statement.

== See also ==
- Minnesota Journal of International Law
- Minnesota Journal of Law, Science & Technology
- Law and Inequality
