= Gray Plant Mooty =

Gray Plant Mooty (Gray, Plant, Mooty, Mooty & Bennett, P.A.) was the oldest continuing law practice in Minneapolis with offices in Minneapolis, MN, St. Cloud, MN, Fargo, ND and Washington, D.C.

== History ==
Gray Plant Mooty was founded in Minneapolis in 1866 by Charles Woods. The firm became Woods & Hahn in 1881 with the addition of Minnesota Attorney General William J. Hahn and Joseph R. Kingman to the firm. In 1977 the firm adopted the name, Gray, Plant, Mooty, Mooty & Bennett, named for the attorneys Franklin Gray, Frank Plant, John Mooty, Melvin Mooty, and Russell Bennett.

Gray Plant Mooty combined with Harstad and Rainbow in 1990, and the firm opened a second office in St. Cloud, Minnesota following a combination with Hall & Byers in 2002. Gray Plant Mooty opened a third office in Washington, D.C. in 2005 and a fourth office in Fargo, North Dakota in 2014. In June 2015, the firm announced a merger with Fargo firm Sandin Law.

In January 2020, the firm combined with Lathrop & Gage to form a new firm, Lathrop GPM LLP.

== Former practice areas ==
- Banking & Financial Services
- Corporate & Business
- Employee Benefits & Executive Compensation
- Family Law
- Franchise & Distribution
- Gaming Law
- Government Relations
- Health Law
- Intellectual Property, Technology & Privacy
- International Law
- Labor, Employment & Higher Education
- Litigation
- Nonprofit & Tax Exempt Organizations
- Real Estate, Environmental Law & Land Use
- Trust, Estate & Charitable Planning

== Notable attorneys ==
Notable attorneys who worked at Gray Plant Mooty include:

- William J. Hahn – Former Minnesota Attorney General
- Myron Frans – Minnesota Management and Budget Commissioner and former Minnesota Revenue Commissioner
- Amy Klobuchar - United States Senator from Minnesota and former County Attorney for Hennepin County, Minnesota
- Robert Stein – Former executive director of the American Bar Association
- Michael P. Sullivan – Former President and CEO of Dairy Queen
- Susan Gaertner – Former County Attorney for Ramsey County, Minnesota

== Notable rankings and awards ==
Notable recognition for the Gray Plant Mooty firm and its attorneys included:

- Ranked among the top law firms globally for franchise law by Chambers and Partners. The firm is also ranked among the top Minnesota firms in Corporate/M&A, Labor & Employment, and Litigation.
- Recognized by Franchise Times with the largest number of franchise attorney "Legal Eagles" from a single firm.
- Ranked by World Trademark Review 1000 as among the world's leading trademark professionals.
- Recognized by Who’s Who Legal with the most franchise attorney honorees from a single firm.
- Recognized by The National Law Journal's "Top 100 Verdicts of 2013" for the firm's $23.78 million verdict for Relco in an intellectual property dispute.
