= David Stras =

American judge (born 1974)

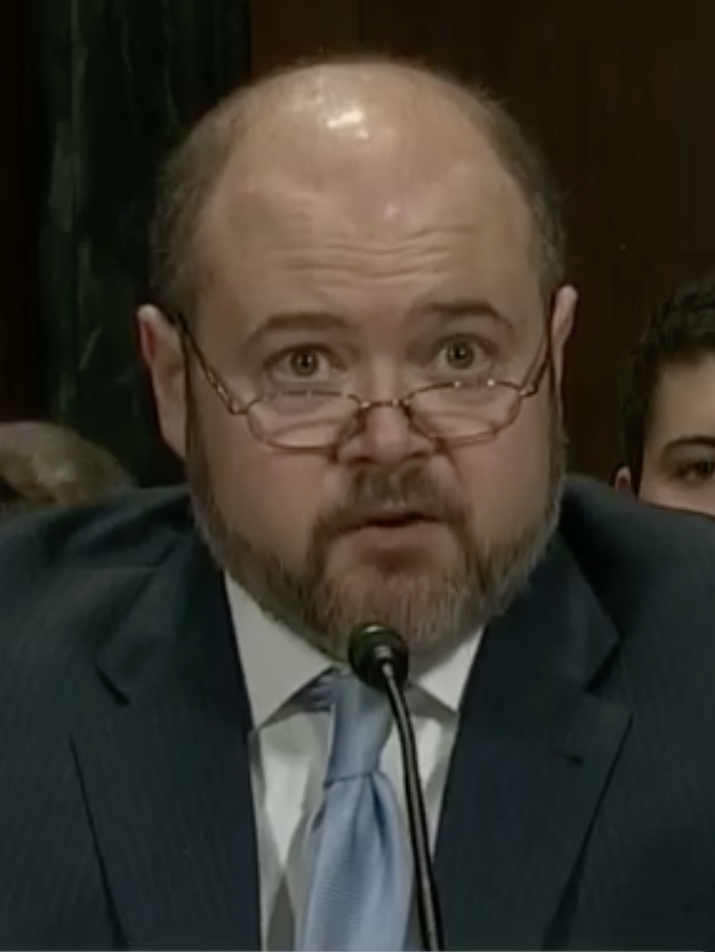
- Stras in 2017

Judge of the United States Court of Appeals for the Eighth Circuit
- Incumbent
- Assumed office January 31, 2018
- Appointed by: Donald Trump
- Preceded by: Diana E. Murphy

Associate Justice of the Minnesota Supreme Court
- In office July 1, 2010 – January 31, 2018
- Appointed by: Tim Pawlenty
- Preceded by: Lorie Gildea
- Succeeded by: Paul Thissen

Personal details
- Born: David Ryan Stras; 1974 (age 51–52) Wichita, Kansas, U.S.
- Spouse: Heather Siegel
- Children: 2
- Education: University of Kansas (BA, JD, MBA)

David Ryan Stras (born 1974) is an American lawyer and jurist serving as a United States circuit judge of the United States Court of Appeals for the Eighth Circuit. He was a justice of the Minnesota Supreme Court from 2010 to 2018 and a law professor at the University of Minnesota Law School from 2004 to 2010.

== Early life and education ==
Stras was born in 1974 in Wichita, Kansas to Jewish American parents. He graduated from the University of Kansas in 1995 with a Bachelor of Arts with highest honors. He then jointly attended the University of Kansas's School of Law and School of Business, receiving a JD–MBA in 1999. As a law student, Stras was editor-in-chief of the Criminal Procedure Edition of the Kansas Law Review. He received his Juris Doctor with Order of the Coif honors.

== Legal career ==
Stras was a law clerk for Judge Melvin Brunetti of the United States Court of Appeals for the Ninth Circuit from 1999 to 2000, then for Judge J. Michael Luttig of the United States Court of Appeals for the Fourth Circuit from 2000 to 2001. After spending a year in private practice at Sidley Austin's Washington, D.C. office, Stras clerked for Justice Clarence Thomas of the United States Supreme Court from 2002 to 2003.

Stras was a fellow at the University of Alabama School of Law from 2003 to 2004. From 2004 to 2010, he was a professor of law at the University of Minnesota Law School, teaching and writing in the areas of federal courts and jurisdiction, constitutional law, criminal law, and law and politics. He won the law school's Stanley V. Kinyon Tenure Track Teacher of the Year Award in 2006. While on the faculty of University of Minnesota Law School, he was also a counsel at Faegre & Bensen. Stras also served as co-director of the Institute for Law and Politics. He has contributed to research on such topics as judicial pensions and life tenure for judges. Stras has also studied judicial appointments and the politics of courts. He is a member of the Federalist Society.

Minnesota Governor Tim Pawlenty appointed Stras to the Minnesota Supreme Court with his term beginning on July 1, 2010. He was sworn in on July 12 in a public ceremony. Stras was elected to a six-year term in 2012. Before his appointment, he was a frequent guest on legal topics at Minnesota Public Radio. He was on President Donald Trump's list of potential Supreme Court nominees.

== Federal judicial service ==
=== Nomination and confirmation ===
On May 8, 2017, President Donald Trump nominated Stras to a seat on the United States Court of Appeals for the Eighth Circuit vacated by Judge Diana E. Murphy, who assumed senior status on November 29, 2016. On September 5, 2017, Minnesota Senator Al Franken announced that he would not return his blue slip for Stras. On November 29, 2017, a hearing was held on his nomination before the Senate Judiciary Committee.

On January 3, 2018, his nomination was returned to the president under Rule XXXI, Paragraph 6 of the United States Senate. On January 5, Trump announced his intent to renominate Stras to a federal judgeship. On January 8, his renomination was sent to the Senate. On January 18, his nomination was reported out of committee by a 13–8 vote. On January 29, the Senate invoked cloture on his nomination by a 57–41 vote. On January 30, the Senate confirmed Stras's nomination by a 56–42 vote. He received his judicial commission on January 31.

=== Notable opinions ===
- On August 23, 2018, Stras wrote a concurring opinion in a case challenging the Federal Housing Finance Agency's ability to hold Fannie Mae and Freddie Mac in conservatorship and require that they pay their entire net worth to the United States Treasury every quarter. Stras argued that, while the statutory provision giving the FHFA such power was textually clear, Congress had "created a monster by handing an agency breathtakingly broad powers and insulating the exercise of those powers from judicial review."
- On August 23, 2019, Stras wrote an opinion for the Eighth Circuit ruling in favor of a Christian videography business challenging Minnesota's public accommodations law under the First Amendment. The Eighth Circuit found that the business owners could not be penalized for refusing to produce wedding videos of same-sex marriages. Stras wrote that forcing the business owners to produce the videos would be a form of compelled speech, and was thus prohibited under the Free Exercise Clause.
- On November 6, 2019, Stras wrote a concurring opinion in a case challenging an Arkansas anti-loitering statute. He argued that the statewide injunction the federal district court originally issued was an unjustified "universal preliminary injunction." According to Stras, the history of injunctions in equity practice strongly suggests that injunctive relief, outside of class actions, should be limited to the parties before the court.
- On November 20, 2021, Stras issued a sharply worded dissent criticizing the panel majority for relying on the North Dakota Department of Public Health's interpretation of a Clean Air Act regulation issued by the Environmental Protection Agency. Stras argued that a state agency did not have the power to interpret a federal regulation and that deferring to such interpretations would harm separation of powers and federalism by giving interpretive authority to state executive officials, rather than federal judges properly situated to determine the meaning of federal law. On June 1, 2021, the Eighth Circuit issued a new opinion that directly interpreted the federal regulation. Stras, again dissenting, hailed the majority for properly exercising "independent judgment" rather than deferring to the state agency's view, but said the majority nonetheless did not interpret the regulatory text correctly.
- On July 30, 2021, Stras dissented from the Eighth Circuit's ruling that members of a St. Louis church lacked standing to challenge a county public health order restricting the size of religious gatherings in response to the COVID-19 pandemic. He argued that the Eighth Circuit's decision to dismiss the case "lock[ed] and deadbolt[ed] the courthouse door for a group of plaintiffs trying to challenge a stay-at-home order that specifically targeted “religious services and other spiritual practices.” Stras criticized the Eighth Circuit for failing to address the county's orders in a timely fashion, suggesting that the county would continue to issue orders burdening religious practice and that the Eighth Circuit's inaction would harm "important constitutional values."
- On July 26, 2022, Stras wrote an opinion for the Eighth Circuit holding that in a False Claims Act prosecution based on illegal kickbacks, the government must prove but-for causation between a kickback and "items or services" provided.
- On November 30, 2022, Stras wrote an opinion for the Eighth Circuit striking down Anoka County's policy of referring every foreign-born detainee, including American citizens, to Immigration and Customs Enforcement. According to Stras, the county's "scattershot approach" would lead it to refer many foreign-born Americans "like Bruce Willis and Arnold Schwarzenegger . . . not to mention six former members of the United States Supreme Court" to ICE.
- On April 20, 2023, Stras wrote an opinion for the Eighth Circuit vacating a district court's decision that charter schools in Missouri are required to spend state funds on desegregation measures. He wrote that the schools "were not a party to the settlement agreement" in which Missouri agreed to desegregate its public schools and that they were in fact created "to offer students a non-segregated alternative to an already-segregated public-school system."
- On June 22, 2023, Stras wrote an opinion for the Eighth Circuit denying judicial immunity for a Missouri judge. The judge had presided over a custody dispute between two parents over their two children. After the two children refused to stay with their mother, the judge sent them to jail and threatened to put them in foster care. Stras wrote that the judge's actions "crossed the line" by "personally lock[ing] them up".
- On August 30, 2023, Stras dissented from the Eighth Circuit's denial of rehearing en banc in a case challenging the constitutionality of the federal felon-in-possession statute under the Second Amendment. Citing New York State Rifle & Pistol Association v. Bruen, he wrote that the history of firearms law in the Founding era did not establish the government's power to prohibit all former felons from owning firearms. According to Stras, that history shows that the government can only prohibit dangerous felons from owning firearms. He criticized the panel opinion for "failing to get the basics" of Bruen correct and "avoid[ing] the sort of probing historical analysis" required by the Supreme Court.
- On November 2, 2023, Stras wrote a majority opinion for the Eighth Circuit vacating the Environmental Protection Agency's decision to ban chlorpyrifos, a widely used insecticide. In 2021, the U.S. Court of Appeals for the Ninth Circuit, in an opinion by Jed Rakoff, gave the EPA 60 days to either ban chlorpyrifos or reduce its approvals of chlorphyrifos to safe levels. The EPA banned chlorphyrifos. Vacating that decision, Stras wrote that despite the "short turnaround time" the Ninth Circuit required, the EPA should have considered an earlier study showing that reduced uses of chlorphyrifos were "likely to be safe", obviating the need for a full ban.
- On November 20, 2023, Stras wrote a majority opinion for the Eighth Circuit holding that private parties may not sue to enforce Section 2 of the Voting Rights Act. Citing Alexander v. Sandoval, he wrote that the Voting Rights Act's "text and structure" allow only the attorney general, not private parties, to bring Section 2 lawsuits. The decision was widely covered by national media.
- On January 10, 2024, Stras wrote a majority opinion for the Eighth Circuit holding that Missouri could sue China for hoarding masks and other personal protective equipment before the COVID-19 pandemic. He wrote that China's alleged actions were "classic anticompetitive behavior" not protected by the Foreign Sovereign Immunities Act.

== Personal life ==
Stras is married to Heather Siegel, a social worker. They have two children. His paternal grandparents were Holocaust survivors, his grandmother from Hungary and grandfather from Germany.

== Selected scholarly works ==
- Stras, David R.; Scott, Ryan W. (2005). "Retaining Life Tenure: The Case for a 'Golden Parachute'". Washington University Law Review. 83 (5): 1397–1467.
- Stras, David R.; Scott, Ryan W. (2007). "Are Senior Judges Unconstitutional?". Cornell Law Review. 92 (3): 453–522.
- Stras, David R. (2007). "Why Supreme Court Justices Should Ride Circuit Again". Minnesota Law Review. 91 (6): 1710–51.

== Electoral history ==
2012

Minnesota Supreme Court Primary Election, 2012
Party	Candidate	Votes	%
Nonpartisan	David Stras (incumbent)	139,218	48.8
Nonpartisan	Tim Tinglestad	83,975	29.5
Nonpartisan	Alan Nelson	61,942	21.7
Plurality		55,243	19.4
Total votes		285,135	100
Runoff election
Nonpartisan	David Stras (incumbent)	1,141,951	56.0
Nonpartisan	Tim Tinglestad	890,301	43.6
Nonpartisan	Write-ins	8,687	0.4
Majority		251,650	12.3
Total votes		2,040,939	100

== See also ==
- List of law clerks for the tenth seat of the Supreme Court of the United States
- List of Jewish American jurists
- List of justices of the Minnesota Supreme Court
- List of first minority male lawyers and judges in Minnesota
- Donald Trump judicial appointment controversies
- Donald Trump Supreme Court candidates

Legal offices
Preceded by Lorie Gildea	Associate Justice of the Minnesota Supreme Court; 2010–2018	Succeeded by Paul Thissen
Preceded by Diana E. Murphy	Judge of the United States Court of Appeals for the Eighth Circuit; 2018–present	Incumbent
