= National Security and Double Government =

2014 book by Michael J. Glennon

- Author: Michael J. Glennon
- Language: English
- Subject: National security, Government of the United States
- Publisher: Oxford University Press
- Publication date: October 2014
- Publication place: United States
- Media type: Print (Hardback)
- Pages: 257
- ISBN: 978-0-19-020644-4
- OCLC: 78812792

National Security and Double Government is a 2014 book by Michael J. Glennon, professor of international law at Tufts University. Glennon argues that democracy in the United States has trended towards mere symbolism, as the Constitution and the rule of law have been eroded by national security concerns and unelected bureaucrats.

== Background ==
Glennon worked closely with insiders in American politics in the 1970s and 1980s. As a law student, he worked as a staff assistant for congressman Donald M. Fraser (D-MN). After law school, he was assistant counsel for the Office of the Legislative Counsel at the United States Senate, and later, counsel to the Senate Foreign Relations Committee, and consultant to the State Department. He is currently professor of international law at the Fletcher School of Law and Diplomacy at Tufts University.

Development of National Security and Double Government began in the 2000s when Glennon noticed an unchanging continuity in national security policy in United States government, particularly from the previous presidency of George W. Bush to the presidency of Barack Obama. (Note: Michael J. Glennon: "I had noticed for years that U.S. national security changed little from one administration to the next, but the continuity was so striking mid-way into the Obama administration that I thought it was time to address the question directly. Hence the book.") He published an article on the subject in the Harvard National Security Journal titled "National Security and Double Government" in 2014, which later evolved into book form.

== Synopsis ==
Glennon draws from the theories of British writer Walter Bagehot (1826–1877), who discussed the structure of British government in his book The English Constitution (1867). He argues that Bagehot's thesis of a "double government" in nineteenth century Britain also applies to the U.S. today. Glennon posits that there are two institutions in control: the "Madisonian" public institutions of the congress, presidency and the courts, which maintain the necessary public illusion that they are in charge and in control of policy, while a secretive "Trumanite" network of unelected, unaccountable national security bureaucrats actually make and set policy that the Madisonians appear to implement as their own. Glennon warns that control by the Trumanite network weakens constitutional restraints upon government, such as checks and balances and oversight, and results in less democracy, and a greater risk of despotism.
