= California Academy of Appellate Lawyers =

The California Academy of Appellate Lawyers is a statewide organization of experienced appellate practitioners. It strives to improve appellate practice in the nation's largest court system.

CAAL was launched in 1972 by Edward L. Lascher and Gideon Kanner, who became its first president. Some of the earliest members included Cyril Viadro, Paul Selvin, Hillel Chodos, Raoul D. Kennedy and Ellis J. Horvitz. CAAL is the oldest organization in America devoted to appellate practice.

Academy members are very frequently counsel of record in the most complex and highest-impact cases before the California Court of Appeal and Supreme Court.

The Academy provides a forum, at its three annual meetings, for justices and practitioners to learn from each other. It files amicus curiae briefs in the California Supreme Court and appellate courts, in cases involving important issues of appellate practice. And it promotes reforms in appellate procedure designed to ensure effective representation of appellate litigants and more efficient administration of justice at the appellate level.

The Academy offers members powerful resources for improving appellate law practice. These include: specialized education aimed far above the basic or intermediate levels available through most other sources, access to the collective experience of fellow members to help solve challenging practice questions; and timely opportunities to influence, or originate, proposed changes to statewide appellate procedure. Members also provide each other insight on the districts they practice in most often. Members are expected to share their time, skills and experience to advance the Academy’s mission.

CAAL's admission policy focuses on the quality of applicants’ contributions to appellate law and commitment to effective appellate practice, without regard to substantive practice area or any “side” of any issue. CAAL’s membership includes appellate attorneys from private, public, and corporate practice, as well as from academia.

== See also ==
- American Academy of Appellate Lawyers
