= Millard Ruud =

American lawyer (1917–1997)

- Born: 1917; Minnesota, United States
- Died: 1997; Austin, Texas, United States
- Education: University of Minnesota, University of Minnesota Law School
- Occupations: Legal scholar, professor
- Employer: University of Texas at Austin
- Known for: Executive director of the Association of American Law Schools, scholarship in legislation and commercial law
- Title: John S. Redditt Professor of Law
- Awards: Outstanding Achievement Award (University of Minnesota, 1980)

Millard Ruud (1917–1997) was executive director of the Association of American Law Schools. A noted scholar of legislation and commercial law, Ruud graduated from the University of Minnesota and the University of Minnesota Law School, where he served as president of the Minnesota Law Review twice. He also served as John S. Redditt Professor and associate dean of law at the University of Texas-Austin. He was given an Outstanding Achievement Award by the University of Minnesota in 1980.

== Personal life ==
Ruud was born in Minnesota, served in World War II, married, and died in Austin, Texas.
