= Reock degree of compactness =

Ratio that quantifies the compactness of the geographic area of a voting district

The Reock degree of compactness, or Reock compactness score, is a ratio that quantifies the compactness of the geographic area of a voting district. The score is sometimes used as an indication of the extent to which a voting district may be considered gerrymandered.

The Reock compactness score is computed by dividing the area of the voting district by the area of the smallest circle that would completely enclose it. Since the circle encloses the district, its area cannot be less than that of the district, and so the Reock compactness score will always be a number between zero and one (which may be expressed as a percentage).

== Criticism ==
Because the Reock compactness score is defined in terms of a circle that must enclose all points of a district, it is sensitive to the orientations of the district's extremities.

Even a very unnatural shape (for example, a "coiled snake") may have a high Reock compactness score so long as it fits compactly within the circumscribing circle.

== See also ==
- Polsby–Popper test
