= Michael J. Glennon =

American lawyer

Michael J. Glennon (born 1947) is Professor of Constitutional and International Law at Tufts University's Fletcher School of Law and Diplomacy. Before teaching, he held positions advising the US Senate on legal aspects of foreign policy in the 1970s. He has written on US foreign relations law, national security, free speech, the use of force, international law, and the roles of Congress and the president in foreign policy. His books include Constitutional Diplomacy, The Fog of Law, Free Speech and Turbulent Freedom, and most notably, National Security and Double Government.

== Education and early career ==
Glennon graduated with a B.A. in Political Science from the University of St. Thomas in 1970. Afterwards, he served on the Minnesota Law Review while earning a J.D. from the University of Minnesota in 1973. During the summers of 1968-1970, he was an intern in the Washington office of Donald M. Fraser in the U.S. House of Representatives.

== Career ==
After law school, Glennon resumed work on Capitol Hill as Assistant Counsel in the Office of the Legislative Counsel of the US Senate from 1973 to 1977. In 1977, he was appointed Legal Counsel to the Senate Foreign Relations Committee, where he served until 1980. In these positions, he handled legal issues involving the War Powers Resolution, the Panama Canal treaties, the Salt II treaty, the Saigon evacuation, arms export controls, the Taiwan Relations Act, and intelligence oversight.

Glennon's academic career began as an adjunct professor at New York University Law School in 1977, where he taught a seminar on foreign relations law with Thomas M. Franck (with whom he later co-authored a casebook on the subject). After practicing law in Washington, D.C., from 1980 to 1981 he taught at law schools at the University of Cincinnati, the University of California, Davis, and Boston University. He was also a Fellow at the Woodrow Wilson International Center for Scholars from 2001 to 2002. Subsequently, he joined the faculty of the Fletcher School of Law and Diplomacy at Tufts University, where he directed the LL.M. Program from 2007 to 2010. He was also the Fulbright Distinguished Professor of International and Constitutional Law at the Vytautas Magnus University School of Law in Kaunas, Lithuania, in 1998.

== Professional contributions ==
Glennon remained active in public affairs, advocating against concentrated executive power and for greater restraints on military intervention. He testified before congressional committees on issues including security commitments, war powers, treaty law, the war on terrorism, state-sponsored assassination and kidnapping, and secrecy pledges. In February 1985, sponsored by the International Human Rights Law Group and the Washington Office on Latin America, he co-directed a field investigation into Contra violations of civilian rights in Northern Nicaragua and later testified on the matter in Nicaragua's case before the International Court of Justice (Nicaragua v. United States). In 1988, as a consultant to the Foreign Relations Committee, he helped craft the Senate's objections to the Reagan administration's attempt to reinterpret the ABM Treaty as part of the Star Wars initiative. That same year, he acted as co-counsel for 110 congressional plaintiffs in Lowry v. Reagan, challenging the legality of the Kuwaiti escort operation under the War Powers Resolution. In 1991, under the sponsorship of the American Bar Association, he was part of a three-person team advising Albanian officials on constitutional reforms. In 1998, at the invitation of Mohamed ElBaradei, he served as a consultant to the International Atomic Energy Agency (IAEA) in Vienna, assisting newly independent states in drafting legislation to implement IAEA treaties.

Glennon is a member of the Council on Foreign Relations and a Life Member of the American Law Institute.

== Works ==
Glennon has written on public international law, the international use of force, foreign relations and national security law, constitutional law, free speech, international human rights, nuclear non-proliferation, and international environmental law. He published Constitutional Diplomacy in 1990, arguing against executive supremacy in U.S. foreign policy, and advocating a stronger role for Congress and the judiciary in shaping diplomatic and national security decisions. In a review for The New York Times, Herbert Mitgang stated, "...it is hard to imagine a book that is more prescient and provocative about the huge military buildup in the Persian Gulf... Glennon writes as if he had a crystal ball that foretold the events." He further analyzed flaws in the U.S. presidential selection process and proposed reforms in When No Majority Rules: The Electoral College and Presidential Succession (1992). His 2001 work, Limits of Law, Prerogatives of Power: Interventionism after Kosovo, examined the erosion of international legal constraints on military intervention and its implications for U.S. policy, and was described as the "best book written on international law and the use of force in the past forty years..." by Anthony Clark Arend.

In 2010, Glennon challenged traditional theories of legal obligation by contending that international law is binding only when enough states choose to honor it in The Fog of Law: Pragmatism, Security, and International Law, which was regarded as a "landmark book" by G. John Ikenberry in Foreign Affairs. He authored National Security and Double Government in 2016, arguing that U.S. security policy is controlled by an unelected "Trumanite network" of military, intelligence, and law enforcement officials, while traditional democratic institutions play only an illusory role. Christopher Coyne remarked, "Glennon's analysis shows how the national security apparatus is a threat to the very freedoms its inhabitants and supporters purport to protect." The same year, he co-authored (with Robert Sloane) Foreign Affairs Federalism: The Myth of National Exclusivity, which the Harvard Law Review described as "an informative and valuable contribution to the literature on federalism and foreign affairs."

Glennon's latest work, Free Speech and Turbulent Freedom: The Dangerous Allure of Censorship in the Digital Era (2024) critiqued the fusion of public and private power in online censorship, arguing that protecting even harmful speech is essential to preserving democracy's marketplace of ideas.

Glennon’s shorter writings have appeared in The New York Times, The Washington Post, Time Magazine, Financial Times, Frankfurter Allgemeine Zeitung, Foreign Affairs, and Harper’s Magazine.

== Bibliography ==
=== Selected books ===
- Constitutional Diplomacy (1990) ISBN 978-0691023052
- When No Majority Rules: The Electoral College and Presidential Succession (1992) ISBN 978-0871878755
- Limits of Law, Prerogatives of Power: Interventionism after Kosovo (2001) ISBN 978-1403963666
- The Fog of Law: Pragmatism, Security, and International Law (2010) ISBN 978-0804771757
- National Security and Double Government (2016) ISBN 978-0190663995
- Foreign Affairs Federalism: The Myth of National Exclusivity (2016) ISBN 978-0199941490
- Free Speech and Turbulent Freedom: The Dangerous Allure of Censorship in the Digital Era (2024) ISBN 978-0197636763

=== Selected articles ===
- Glennon, M. J. (1990). Has international law failed the elephant?. American Journal of International Law, 84(1), 1-43.
- Glennon, M. J. (1999). The New Interventionism-The Search for a Just International Law. Foreign Affairs, 78, 2.
- Glennon, M. J. (2001). The fog of law: Self-defense, inherence, and incoherence in Article 51 of the United Nations Charter. Harvard Journal of Law and Public Policy, 25, 539.
- Glennon, M. J. (2003). Why the Security Council Failed. Foreign Affairs, 82(3), 16–35.
- Glennon, M. J. (2004). How international rules die. The Georgetown Law Journal, 93, 939.
- Glennon, M. J. (2022). Symbiotic Security and Free Speech. Harvard National Security Journal, 14, 102.
