= Michael P. Sullivan =

American lawyer (1934–2024)

- Born: December 5, 1934
- Died: November 20, 2024 (aged 89)
- Education: University of Minnesota Law School
- Alma mater: Marquette University
- Occupation: Director
- Employer: Allianz Life Insurance Co.

Michael P. Sullivan (December 5, 1934 – November 20, 2024) was an American attorney and President and CEO of Dairy Queen.

== Career ==
Sullivan was a graduate of Marquette University and University of Minnesota Law School and former Naval officer. Sullivan practiced business and franchise law at Gray Plant Mooty for 25 years prior to becoming the CEO of Dairy Queen, including 10 years as the firm's managing officer.

Sullivan guided Dairy Queen from 1987 to 2001, and battled McDonald's, Wendy's, and Burger King in the fast food market. He also resolved internal problems with Dairy Queen distributors. Sullivan sold Dairy Queen to Warren Buffett and Berkshire Hathaway in 1998.

Sullivan also served as a Director of The Valspar Corporation from 1990 to February 2005. In 2005, he was named the Opus Distinguished Chair in Family Business at the University of St. Thomas College of Business. Sullivan served as Director of Allianz Life Insurance Co. of North America and Adler Trust Company. Sullivan died on November 20, 2024, at the age of 89.
