= Russell A. Anderson =

American judge and attorney (1942–2020)

The Honorable Russell A. Anderson

Chief Justice Minnesota Supreme Court
- In office January 10, 2006 – June 1, 2008
- Appointed by: Tim Pawlenty
- Preceded by: Kathleen A. Blatz
- Succeeded by: Eric J. Magnuson

Associate Justice Minnesota Supreme Court
- In office September 1, 1998 – January 10, 2006
- Appointed by: Arne Carlson
- Preceded by: Esther M. Tomljanovich
- Succeeded by: Lorie Skjerven Gildea

Personal details
- Born: May 28, 1942 Bemidji, Minnesota, U.S.
- Died: September 15, 2020 (aged 78)
- Spouse: Kristin Anderson
- Education: University of Minnesota Law School; George Washington University

Military service
- Allegiance: United States
- Branch/service: United States Navy
- Years of service: 1968–1971
- Rank: Lieutenant Commander
- Unit: J.A.G. Corps

Russell A. Anderson (May 28, 1942 – September 15, 2020) was an attorney who served as Chief Justice of the Minnesota Supreme Court. He served as an associate justice of the court from September 1, 1998, until he was sworn in as chief justice on January 10, 2006. He retired from the Supreme Court on June 1, 2008, at age 66, and was succeeded by Eric J. Magnuson.

Anderson died in September 2020 at the age of 78.

== Early life and education ==
Anderson graduated from St. Olaf College in Northfield in 1964, then went on to the University of Minnesota Law School in Minneapolis, earning his J.D. in 1968. He later attended George Washington University in Washington, D.C., earning his Master of Laws degree in 1977.

== Career ==
His first legal experience came while in military service. Lieutenant Commander Anderson served in the Judge Advocate General's Corps of the U.S. Navy. He acted as prosecutor and defense attorney for general and lesser courts-martial, as military judge for special and summary court-martial, and as civil and criminal staff attorney in the Office of Judge Advocate General, Washington, D.C. He was in private practice in Bemidji from 1976 to 1982. He was the Beltrami County Attorney from 1978 to 1982. Anderson had worked as judge on the Ninth District Court since 1983, having been appointed by Governor Al Quie. He was named to the state's high court in 1998 by Governor Arne Carlson.

Legal offices
Preceded by Kathleen A. Blatz	Chief Justice of the Minnesota Supreme Court; 2006–2008	Succeeded by Eric J. Magnuson
Preceded by Esther M. Tomljanovich	Associate Justice of the Minnesota Supreme Court; 1998–2006	Succeeded by Lorie Skjerven Gildea
