= William Hawkland =

American lawyer

William Dennis Hawkland (November 25, 1920 – November 7, 2004) was Chancellor of Louisiana State University from 1979 to 1989. Hawkland was also the holder of a Boyd Professorship at LSU.

A noted scholar of commercial transaction law and banking law, Hawkland graduated from the University of Minnesota Law School in 1947, and subsequently received an honorary Doctor of Laws degree from the University of Minnesota in 2005. He additionally taught law at the University of Illinois, Urbana-Champaign, and was given the Homer Kripke Achievement Award by the American College of Commercial Finance Lawyers in 1997. He served as Dean of the SUNY Buffalo law school and taught law at Rutgers University, Temple University, and UCLA as well.

== Personal life ==
He resided in Baton Rouge, Louisiana and was married to Rosemary Neal Hawkland.
