= Ann D. Montgomery =

American judge (born 1949)

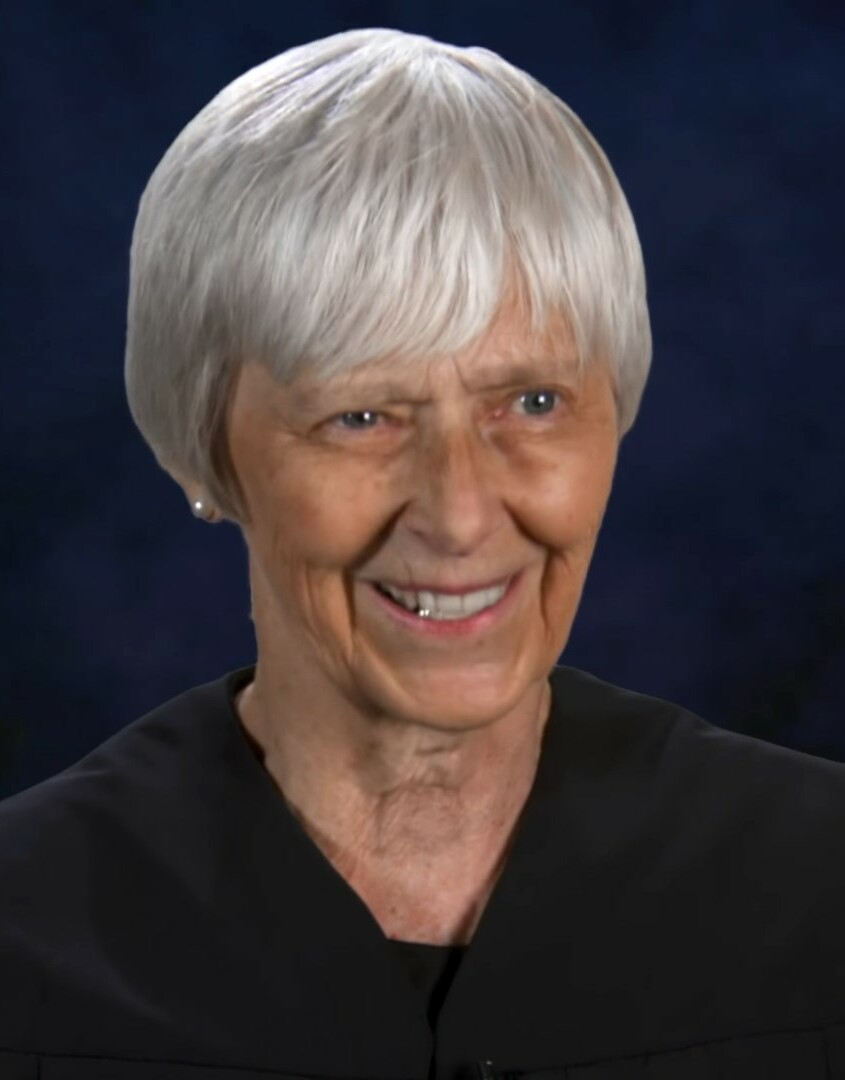
- Montgomery in 2018

Senior Judge of the United States District Court for the District of Minnesota
- Incumbent
- Assumed office May 31, 2016

Judge of the United States District Court for the District of Minnesota
- In office August 6, 1996 – May 31, 2016
- Appointed by: Bill Clinton
- Preceded by: Diana E. Murphy
- Succeeded by: Nancy E. Brasel

Magistrate Judge of the United States District Court for the District of Minnesota
- In office 1994–1996

Personal details
- Born: Ann Day Olson; 1949 (age 76–77) Litchfield, Minnesota, U.S.
- Education: University of Kansas (BS); University of Minnesota (JD)

Ann Day Montgomery (née Olson; born 1949) is a senior United States district judge of the United States District Court for the District of Minnesota.

== Education and career ==
Montgomery was born in Litchfield, Minnesota. She received a Bachelor of Science degree from the University of Kansas in 1971 and a Juris Doctor from the University of Minnesota Law School in 1974. She was a law clerk to Gerard D. Reilly and Hubert Pair, both of the District of Columbia Court of Appeals from 1974 to 1975. She was an Assistant United States Attorney of the District of Minnesota from 1976 to 1983. She was a judge on the Hennepin County Municipal Court, Minnesota from 1983 to 1985, and of the county's District Court in Minneapolis from 1985 to 1994.

=== Federal judicial service ===
Montgomery became a United States magistrate judge of the United States District Court for the District of Minnesota in 1994.

On November 27, 1995, Montgomery was nominated by President Bill Clinton to a seat on the United States District Court for the District of Minnesota vacated by Judge Diana E. Murphy. Montgomery was confirmed by the United States Senate on August 2, 1996, and received her commission on August 6, 1996. She assumed senior status on May 31, 2016.

== Sources ==
Legal offices
Preceded by Diana E. Murphy	Judge of the United States District Court for the District of Minnesota; 1996–2016	Succeeded by Nancy E. Brasel
