= Frank Claybourne =

American jurist

Frank Claybourne (born Charles Franklin Claybourne; July 7, 1916 – July 28, 2011) was an American jurist, president of the Minnesota State Bar Association, and general counsel of the Republican Party of Minnesota from 1950 to 1974.

Claybourne was born on July 7, 1916, in Albert Lea, Minnesota. He received a B.B.A. degree in 1937 and an L.L.B. degree in 1943, both from the University of Minnesota. He served as note editor of the Minnesota Law Review in 1943. Claybourne first practiced law as a litigation attorney with Doherty, Rumble, and Butler in St. Paul, Minnesota. Later he moved to Wyoming, Minnesota. He served as president of the Ramsey County Bar Association in 1972 and president of the Minnesota Bar Association from 1979 to 1980. The Minnesota Supreme Court frequently appointed him to serve in posts including the Committee on Criminal Procedure, which he chaired for more than a decade.

Claybourne was active in civic and political affairs. He served as general counsel to the Republican Party of Minnesota from 1950 to 1974 and counsel to many Republican campaigns, including those of presidential candidate Harold Stassen and senatorial candidate Rudy Boschwitz. He died on July 28, 2011, at the age of 95.
