= Eric J. Magnuson =

American judge

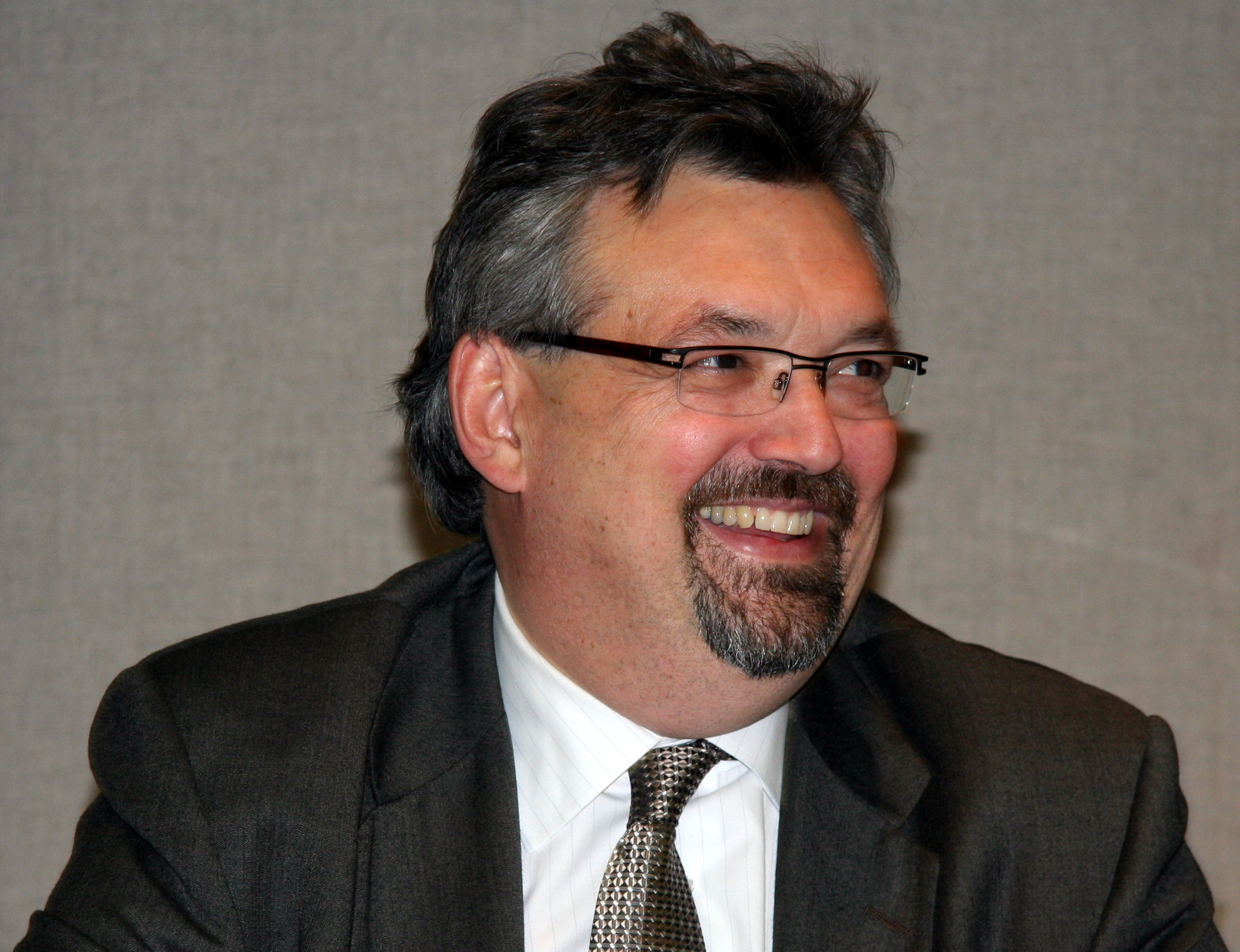
- Magnuson in 2010

Chief Justice of the Minnesota Supreme Court
- In office June 2, 2008 – July 1, 2010
- Nominated by: Tim Pawlenty
- Preceded by: Russell A. Anderson
- Succeeded by: Lorie Skjerven Gildea

Personal details
- Born: January 27, 1951 (age 75) Morris, Illinois, U.S.
- Education: University of Minnesota; William Mitchell College of Law

Eric John Magnuson (born January 27, 1951) is an American lawyer in private practice. He was the Chief Justice of the Minnesota Supreme Court from 2008 to 2010.

== Education and professional background ==
Magnuson was born in Morris, Illinois. He graduated from Osseo High School, Osseo, Minnesota in 1968 and the University of Minnesota in Minneapolis in 1972, and from William Mitchell College of Law in Saint Paul in 1976. During his third year of law school, Magnuson clerked for future state Chief Justice Douglas Amdahl, then a Hennepin County district judge. The following year, he clerked for then-Chief Justice Robert Sheran.

Magnuson joined the Minneapolis law firm of Rider Bennett in 1977. An appellate lawyer in the state and federal courts, he served as president of the American Academy of Appellate Lawyers and founded the Eighth Circuit Bar Association. Governor Tim Pawlenty chose him to chair the state Commission on Judicial Selection from 2003 to 2008. In 2007, after Rider Bennett dissolved, he joined the Minneapolis law firm of Briggs & Morgan.

== Judicial service ==
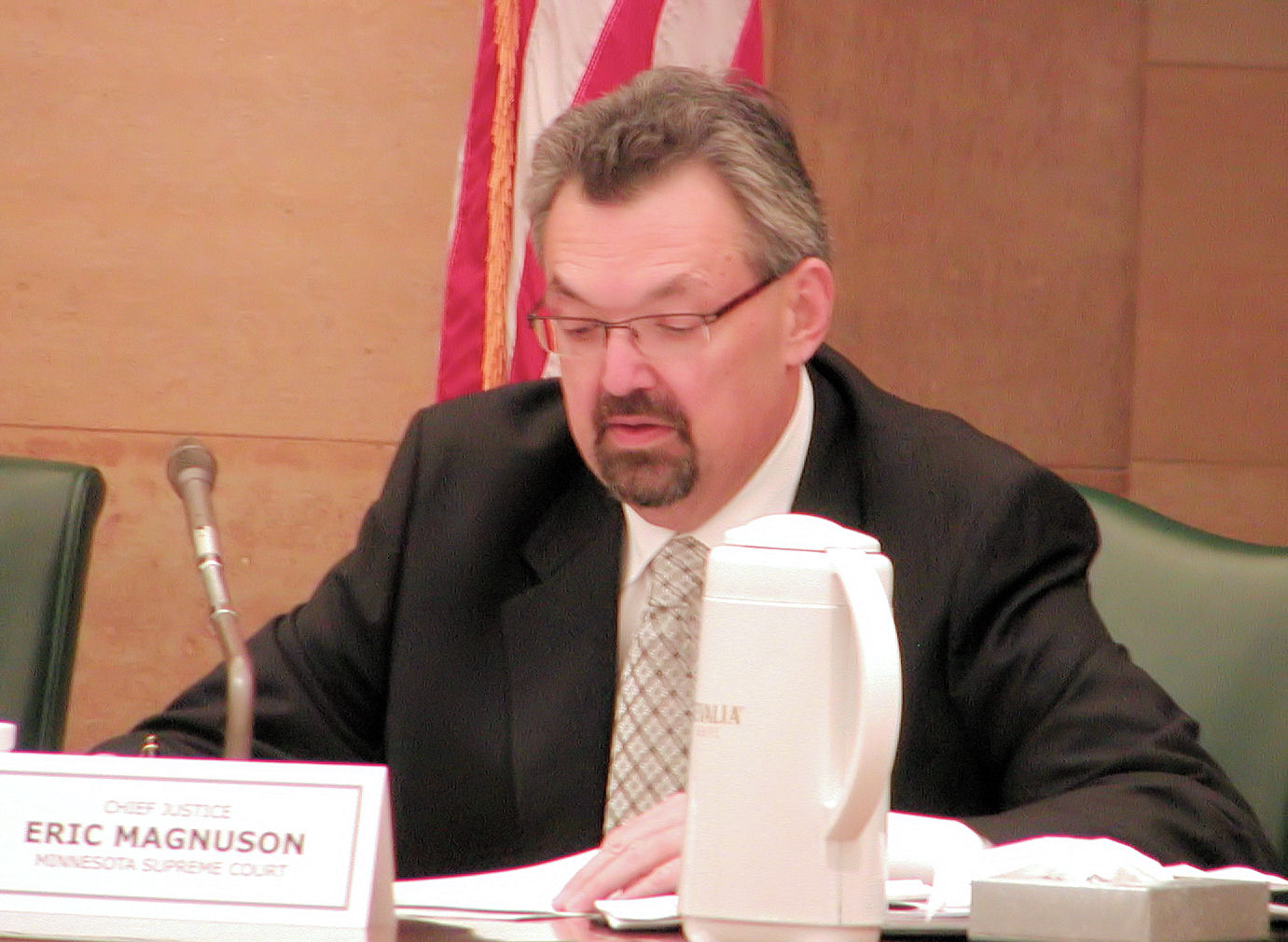
Magnuson on the State Canvassing Board in 2008

On March 17, 2008, Governor Pawlenty appointed Magnuson Chief Justice of the Minnesota Supreme Court to succeed the retiring Russell A. Anderson. He was sworn in on June 2, 2008.

Magnuson served on the State Canvassing Board for the United States Senate election in Minnesota, 2008.

On March 11, 2010, Magnuson announced that he would be stepping down as chief justice on June 30, 2010, returning to the private practice of law. In his resignation letter to the governor, he cited "reasons personal to me and my family."

On May 5, 2010, Magnuson authored a 4-3 decision of the Minnesota Supreme Court, ruling that Minnesota Gov. Tim Pawlenty had overstepped his authority by rescinding funding passed by the Minnesota legislature. Pawlenty was Magnuson's former law partner.

== Post-Supreme Court ==
Magnuson became a partner at Robins Kaplan LLP, and teaches at Humphrey School of Public Affairs. In 2014, the Minnesota Vikings hired Magnuson and Chris Madel to lead an independent investigation concerning the Vikings' termination of Chris Kluwe.

Legal offices
Preceded by Russell A. Anderson	Chief Justice of the Minnesota Supreme Court; 2008 – 2010	Succeeded by Lorie Skjerven Gildea
