= Nancy E. Brasel =

British-American judge (born 1969)

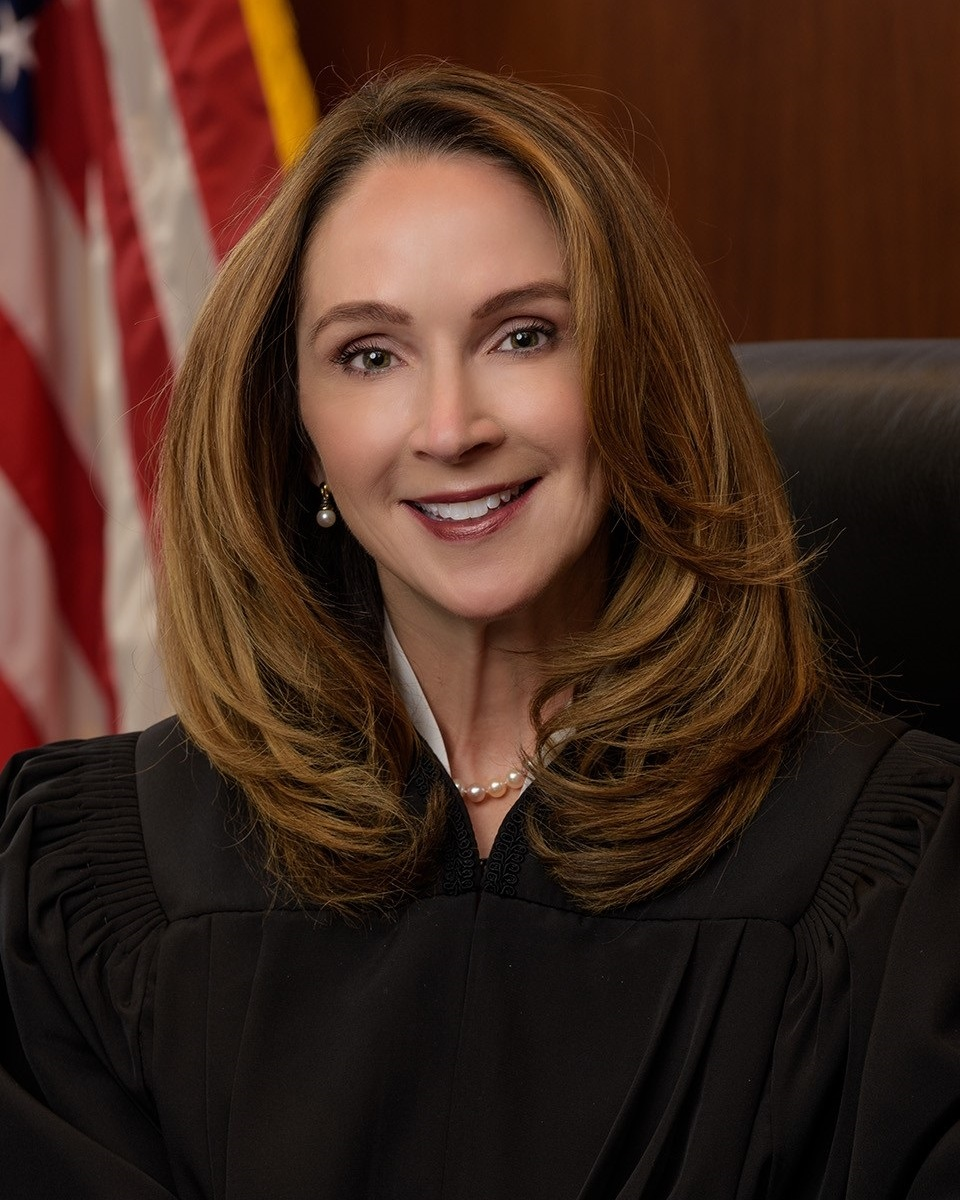

Judge of the United States District Court for the District of Minnesota
- Incumbent
- Assumed office September 13, 2018
- Appointed by: Donald Trump
- Preceded by: Ann D. Montgomery

Judge of the Minnesota State District Court for the 4th Judicial District
- In office October 17, 2011 – September 13, 2018
- Appointed by: Mark Dayton

Personal details
- Born: 1969 (age 56–57) Durham, England
- Education: Trinity University (BA); University of Texas at Austin (MA); University of Minnesota (JD)

Nancy Ellen Brasel (born 1969) is a United States federal judge of the United States District Court for the District of Minnesota.

== Early life and education ==
Born in England, Brasel earned her Bachelor of Arts from Trinity University in 1991, where she was inducted into Phi Beta Kappa, her Master of Arts from the University of Texas at Austin in 1993, and her Juris Doctor, magna cum laude, from the University of Minnesota in 1996, where she was inducted into the Order of the Coif and served as a managing editor of the Minnesota Law Review.

== Career ==
After graduating from law school, Brasel served as a law clerk to Judge Donald P. Lay of the United States Court of Appeals for the Eighth Circuit from 1996 to 1997. After her clerkship, Brasel worked in private practice as an associate with the Minneapolis law firm of Leonard, Street and Deinard (now Stinson).

In 1999, Brasel became a partner at Greene Espel, P.L.L.P., where her practice focused on business law and employment law. Before her judicial appointment, she spent three years as an assistant United States Attorney for the United States District Court for the District of Minnesota, where she prosecuted narcotics and firearms offenses and white-collar crime.

In 2011, Minnesota Governor Mark Dayton appointed Brasel to the state District Court of Minnesota for the Fourth Judicial District in Hennepin County, where she served until becoming a federal judge. She is a former chair of the board of directors for the Domestic Abuse Project in Minneapolis.

== Federal judicial service ==
In 2017, Senator Amy Klobuchar recommended Brasel to the Trump administration as a federal judge. On February 12, 2018, President Donald Trump announced his intent to nominate Brasel to an undetermined seat on the United States District Court for the District of Minnesota as part of a bipartisan package of judicial nominees that included Minneapolis lawyer Eric Tostrud. On February 15, her nomination was sent to the Senate. Trump nominated Brasel to the seat vacated by Judge Ann D. Montgomery, who assumed senior status on May 31, 2016. Brasel was rated "unanimously well qualified" by the American Bar Association. On April 11, 2018, a hearing on her nomination was held before the Senate Judiciary Committee. On May 10, her nomination was reported out of committee by voice vote. On August 28, her nomination was confirmed by voice vote. She received her judicial commission on September 13, 2018.

=== Notable rulings ===
In October 2020, Brasel upheld a state court ruling that ballots received seven days after the 2020 election must be counted.

In February 2026, Brasel ruled that United States Immigration and Customs Enforcement (ICE) had likely violated the constitutional rights of thousands of detainees at the Bishop Henry Whipple Federal Building in Minneapolis. Brasel's emergency restraining order noted that detainees faced numerous barriers to accessing legal counsel and that "in planning for Operation Metro Surge, the government failed to plan for the constitutional rights of its civil detainees". Her order required the government to give non-citizens in custody the opportunity to contact legal counsel within an hour of their detention and before any transfer out of state.

In May 2026, Brasel sentenced Aimee Bock to more than 41 years in prison for her part in the Feeding Our Future fraud scheme.

== Electoral history ==
2012

4th Judicial District Seat 29 Results, November 6, 2012
Party	Candidate	Votes	%
Nonpartisan	Nancy E. Brasel (incumbent)	308,580	98.68
None	Write-ins	4,140	1.32
Majority			
Total votes			100.00%

Legal offices
Preceded by Ann D. Montgomery	Judge of the United States District Court for the District of Minnesota; 2018–present	Incumbent
