= Lorie Skjerven Gildea =

American judge (born 1961)

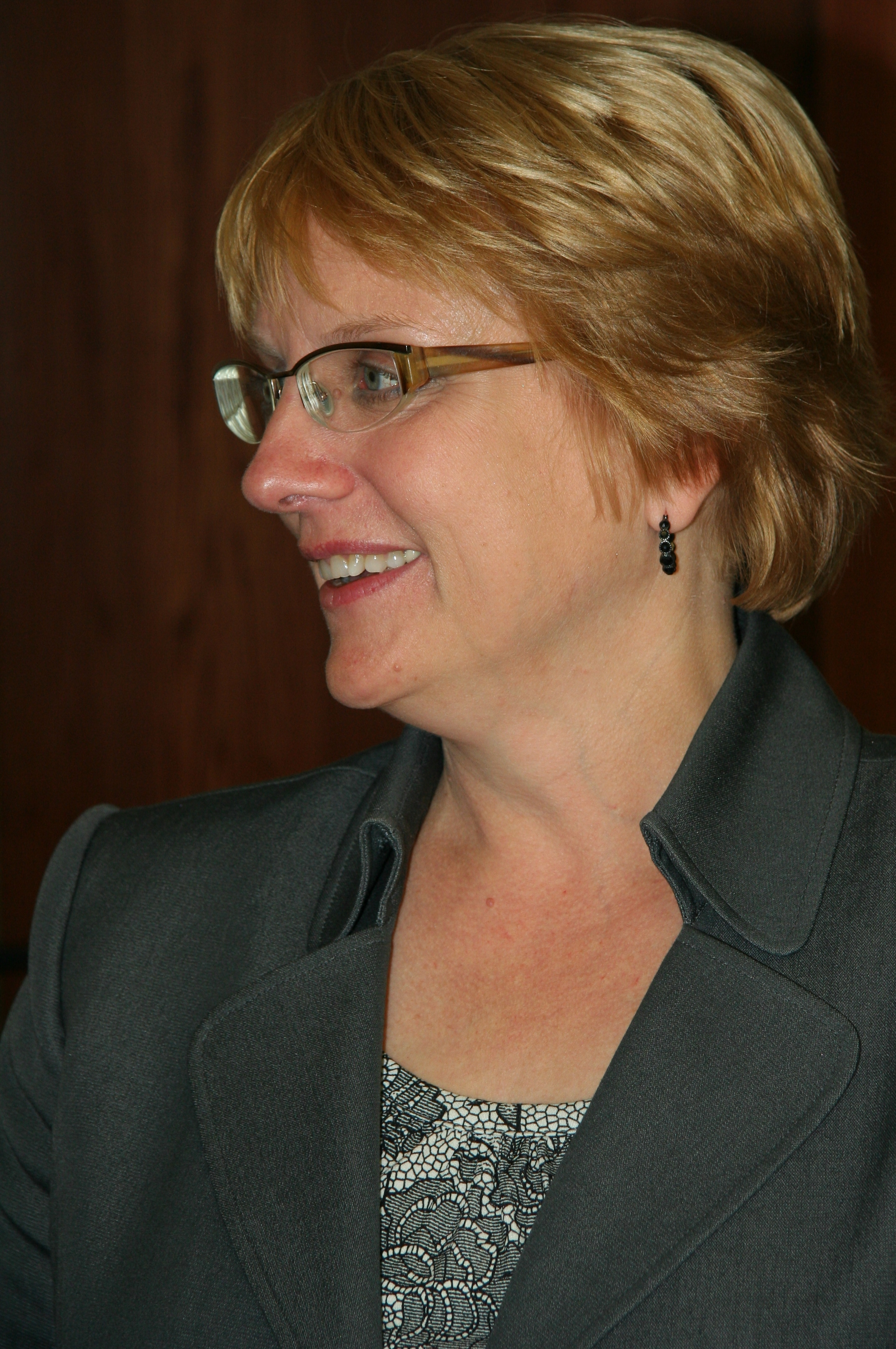
- Gildea in 2010

Chief Justice of the Minnesota Supreme Court
- In office July 1, 2010 – October 1, 2023
- Appointed by: Tim Pawlenty
- Preceded by: Eric Magnuson
- Succeeded by: Natalie Hudson

Associate Justice of the Minnesota Supreme Court
- In office January 11, 2006 – July 1, 2010
- Appointed by: Tim Pawlenty
- Preceded by: Russell Anderson
- Succeeded by: David Stras

Judge of the 4th Judicial District of Minnesota
- In office September 26, 2005 – January 10, 2006
- Appointed by: Tim Pawlenty
- Preceded by: Myron Greenberg
- Succeeded by: Daniel Moreno

Personal details
- Born: October 6, 1961 (age 65) Plummer, Minnesota, U.S.
- Education: University of Minnesota, Morris (BA); Georgetown University (JD)

Lorie Skjerven Gildea (born October 6, 1961) is an American attorney. She served as chief justice of the Minnesota Supreme Court from her appointment by Governor Tim Pawlenty in 2010 until her retirement on October 1, 2023. She served as an associate justice of the Court from 2006 to 2010 and as a district judge for Hennepin County in the Fourth Judicial District from 2005 to 2006.

== Early life and education ==
Gildea was born on October 6, 1961, and raised in Plummer, Minnesota. She received a Bachelor of Arts, with distinction, from the University of Minnesota Morris in 1983, and a Juris Doctor, magna cum laude, from the Georgetown University Law Center in 1986.

== Career ==
After law school, she remained in Washington, D.C., and entered private practice at Arent Fox.

Gildea later returned to Minnesota where, after working briefly as a special prosecutor for the city of Minneapolis, she became an associate general counsel for the University of Minnesota. She represented the university system for 11 years, including during the scandal involving former men's basketball coach Clem Haskins. She served on the Minnesota Sentencing Guidelines Commission from 2001 to 2004 under Governors Jesse Ventura and Tim Pawlenty.

=== Judicial service ===
Pawlenty appointed Gildea an associate justice of the Minnesota Supreme Court in 2006. Her seat on the Court was up for election in 2008. She defeated three opponents in the primary election and Hennepin County District Judge Deborah Hedlund in the general election. In 2010, Pawlenty appointed her chief justice of the Minnesota Supreme Court, replacing Eric Magnuson. Her term as chief justice began on July 1, 2010, and she was sworn in at a July 12 ceremony in Saint Paul.

In 2012, Gildea was reelected chief justice, defeating Daniel Griffith in the general election with 60% of the vote. In 2018, Gildea was again reelected chief justice, unopposed.

In June 2023, Gildea announced her resignation, effective October 1, 2023.

== Personal life ==
Gildea lives in the Lowry Hill neighborhood of Minneapolis. She is an accomplished equestrian. She was married to Andrew J. "Andy" Gildea, whom she met in law school. He was an active Republican. He died on November 5, 2021.

Legal offices
| Preceded by Russell Anderson | Associate Justice of the Minnesota Supreme Court; 2006–2010 | Succeeded by David Stras |
| Preceded by Eric Magnuson | Chief Justice of the Minnesota Supreme Court; 2010–2023 | Succeeded by Natalie Hudson |
