= Diana E. Murphy =

American judge (1934–2018)

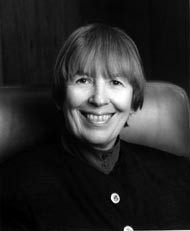

Senior Judge of the United States Court of Appeals for the Eighth Circuit
- In office November 29, 2016 – May 16, 2018

Judge of the United States Court of Appeals for the Eighth Circuit
- In office October 11, 1994 – November 29, 2016
- Appointed by: Bill Clinton
- Preceded by: John R. Gibson
- Succeeded by: David Stras

Chief Judge of the United States District Court for the District of Minnesota
- In office 1992–1994
- Preceded by: Harry H. MacLaughlin
- Succeeded by: Paul A. Magnuson

Judge of the United States District Court for the District of Minnesota
- In office February 20, 1980 – October 13, 1994
- Appointed by: Jimmy Carter
- Preceded by: Seat established by 92 Stat. 1629
- Succeeded by: Ann D. Montgomery

Personal details
- Born: Diana Esther Kuske; January 4, 1934 Faribault, Minnesota, U.S.
- Died: May 16, 2018 (aged 84) Minneapolis, Minnesota, U.S.
- Education: University of Minnesota (BA, JD)

Diana Esther Murphy (née Kuske; January 4, 1934 – May 16, 2018) was a United States circuit judge of the United States Court of Appeals for the Eighth Circuit and a former United States district judge of the United States District Court for the District of Minnesota.

== Education and career ==
Murphy was born in Faribault, Minnesota. She graduated from St. Paul Central High School at age 16 and enrolled at the University of Minnesota, where she majored in Central European Area Studies and graduated with a Bachelor of Arts degree in 1954. She then went on to win a Fulbright Scholarship to study at the Johannes Gutenberg University in Mainz, Germany, where she met her future husband, Joseph Murphy. After getting married, she stayed home to raise their two sons. She received a Juris Doctor from the University of Minnesota Law School in 1974. At law school, she was an editor of the Minnesota Law Review. She was in private practice of law in Minneapolis, Minnesota, from 1974 to 1976. She was a judge on the Hennepin County Municipal Court, Minnesota from 1976 to 1978. She was a judge on the Minnesota District Court, Fourth Judicial District from 1978 to 1980. She was the Commission Chair of the United States Sentencing Commission from 1999 to 2004.

== Federal judicial service ==
Murphy was nominated by President Jimmy Carter on November 30, 1979, to the United States District Court for the District of Minnesota, to a new seat created by 92 Stat. 1629. She was confirmed by the United States Senate on February 20, 1980, and received commission the same day. She served as Chief Judge from 1992 to 1994. Her service was terminated on October 13, 1994, due to elevation to the Eighth Circuit.

Murphy was nominated by President Bill Clinton on July 28, 1994, to a seat on the United States Court of Appeals for the Eighth Circuit vacated by Judge John R. Gibson. She was confirmed by the Senate on October 7, 1994, and received commission on October 11, 1994. Upon assuming office, Murphy became the first woman to serve on the Eighth Circuit.

Murphy assumed senior status on November 29, 2016. She died in her home in Minneapolis on May 16, 2018, shortly after announcing her full retirement from the bench. Later that year, the Minnesota Law Review hosted a memorial symposium in her honor, which included contributions from Justice Ruth Bader Ginsburg, Judge Michael Joseph Melloy, and Judge Rubén Castillo.

After her death, the United States federal courthouse in Minneapolis was renamed in her honor.

== Attorney General consideration ==
In 1993, she was reportedly considered for the post of Attorney General of the United States, which later went to Janet Reno.

== See also ==
- List of United States federal judges by longevity of service

== Sources ==
Legal offices
Preceded by Seat established by 92 Stat. 1629	Judge of the United States District Court for the District of Minnesota; 1980–1994	Succeeded by Ann D. Montgomery
Preceded by John R. Gibson	Judge of the United States Court of Appeals for the Eighth Circuit; 1994–2016	Succeeded by David Stras
