= M. Jeanne Coyne =

American judge

Mary Jeanne Coyne (December 7, 1926 – August 6, 1998) was an associate justice of the Minnesota Supreme Court. A fourteen-year veteran of the court (1982-1996), Coyne was born in Minneapolis, Minnesota, graduated from the University of Minnesota, and University of Minnesota Law School. She authored numerous opinions as a Justice. She was the second woman to serve on the Minnesota Supreme Court.
