= Robert A. Stein (law professor) =

American lawyer

Robert A. Stein (born 1939) is a former executive director of the American Bar Association (1994-2006) and the Everett Fraser Professor of Law at the University of Minnesota Law School (UMLS). A scholar of estate planning, Stein was previously the William Pattee Professor and Dean at UMLS, from which he received his law degree in 1961. He also taught law at UCLA and the University of Chicago.

== Career outside academia ==
Stein was a trustee of Great Northern Iron Ore, and was of counsel with the law firm of Gray Plant Mooty. From 1994 to 2006, he served as executive director and chief operating officer of the American Bar Association, the world's largest professional organization. Stein served as President of the National Conference of Commissioners on Uniform State Laws from 2009-2011.

== Awards ==
Stein's professional awards include:

- Outstanding Service to the Profession Award, Minnesota Lawyer, 2009
- University of Minnesota Alumni Service Award, 2007
- Lena O. Smith Humanitarian Award, Minnesota Black Women Lawyers Network, 2002
- Minnesota State Bar Association, Presidents Award, 1998
- Distinguished Service Award, WCHA, 1995
- Honorary doctorate from the Faculty of Law at Uppsala University, Sweden, 1994

== Personal life ==
Stein currently resides in Minnesota. He has three daughters and six grandchildren.
