= Polsby–Popper test =

Mathematical compactness measure of a shape

The Polsby–Popper test is a mathematical compactness measure of a shape developed to quantify the degree of gerrymandering of political districts. The method was developed by lawyers Daniel D. Polsby and Robert Popper, though it had earlier been introduced in the field of paleontology by E.P. Cox. The method was chosen by Arizona's redistricting commission in 2000.

== Definition ==
The formula for calculating a district's Polsby–Popper score is $PP(D) = \frac {4\pi A(D)} {P(D)^2}$, where $D$ is the district, $P(D)$ is the perimeter of the district, and $A(D)$ is the area of the district. A district's Polsby–Popper score will always fall within the interval of $[0,1]$, with a score of $0$ indicating complete lack of compactness and a score of $1$ indicating maximal compactness. Only a perfectly round district will reach a Polsby–Popper score of 1.

Compared to other measures that use dispersion to measure gerrymandering, the Polsby–Popper test is very sensitive to both physical geography (for instance, convoluted coastal borders) and map resolution.

== Contradiction to other measures ==
Fairness criteria for gerrymandering can stand in contradiction to each other. For example, in some cases to sufficiently fulfill the One man, one vote criterion and low efficiency gap would result in low Polsby–Popper compactness.

== See also ==
- Isoperimetric inequality
- Roundness
