= Terrance Hanold =

American lawyer

- Born: 1912
- Died: 1996 (aged 83–84)
- Education: University of Minnesota Law School
- Alma mater: University of Minnesota
- Occupation: President
- Years active: 1967–
- Employer: Pillsbury Company

Terrance Hanold (1912–1996) was an American attorney, food industry executive, and President of the Pillsbury Company.

Hanold was an orphan from the age of four after his parents died in an unknown fire. He was then adopted and moved to a farm family in Illinois where descendants still live to this day as cattle farmers. Hanold was a graduate of the University of Minnesota, the University of Minnesota Law School, and married to Ruth E. Hanold. He also practiced law in Minnesota and left his papers to the University of Minnesota archives.

Upon becoming Pillsbury President in 1967, Hanold diversified the management structure of the company. He travelled the United States to tend to the large Pillsbury operation.
