= Ernest Gellhorn =

American lawyer

Ernest Gellhorn (1935–2005) was an American academic and legal scholar. He graduated from the University of Minnesota, the University of Minnesota Law School, and was a Guggenheim fellow. An expert on administrative and antitrust law, Gellhorn held a number of academic appointments, including dean of law in three universities: (Arizona State University, Case Western Reserve University, and the University of Washington). Additionally, he was Boyd Professor of Law at the University of Virginia, Foundation Professor of Law at George Mason University, and professor of law at Duke University.

Gellhorn also was active in the American Bar Association, practiced law in Washington D.C., and testified before government agencies such as the Federal Trade Commission.
