= Daniel D. Polsby =

American lawyer

Daniel D. Polsby (born 1945) is former dean of the law school and professor of law at Antonin Scalia Law School (George Mason University) and was previously Kirkland and Ellis Professor of Law at Northwestern University. He retired from George Mason University in 2021.

== Education ==
A research fellow at The Independent Institute, Polsby is a graduate of Oakland University and the University of Minnesota Law School. He is licensed to practice law in New York.

== Scholarship and expertise ==
Polsby is a scholar of the right to bear arms and testified for gun rights before the United States Congress. He has also contributed to the Cato Journal, Reason Magazine, National Review. and the Atlantic Monthly. Polsby is a member of the American Law Institute. Polsby is often cited in regard to judicial appointments and issues. He also commented against gerrymandering and term limits. He co-developed, with Robert Popper, the Polsby–Popper test for quantifying gerrymandering.
