= John Farrell (poet) =

J.P.Farrell
- J.P. Farrell, Fall (NYC) 2006

Background information
- Born: John Patrick Farrell; May 22, 1968
- Origin: Glen Cove, New York, U.S.
- Died: November 4, 2010 (aged 42)
- Genres: Free Verse, Beat, Experimental, Postmodern
- Occupations: Musician; writer; composer; publisher
- Instruments: Upright Bass, Electric Bass, Percussion
- Years active: 1986–2010

John Patrick Farrell (22 May 1968 – 3 November 2010) was an American poet and composer.

== Early life ==
J.P. Farrell was born in Glen Cove, New York and pursued study of music from an early age. He composed music and performed in numerous ensembles in Long Island. Farrell entered SUNY Fredonia School of Music in 1986 as a Music Theory and Film major. He later transferred to SUNY Geneseo to pursue music composition studies with James Willey. Upon his graduation, Farrell remained semi-active in the New York Jazz scene as a bassist; performing with pianist Hyperion Knight. J.P. Farrell was a member of the Songwriters Guild of America and the American Federation of Musicians.

== Literary career ==
Farrell moved to Minneapolis in 1994 and worked with the St. Paul Chamber Orchestra and Minnesota Opera. He enrolled at the University of Minnesota in the MFA program for Creative Writing in 1999. It was there that he studied poetry with Ray Gonzalez and won several awards for his poetry including an ArtsWords Award in 2002, and has been published in numerous academic poetry journals. He was an active poet and music teacher in Boerne, Texas. In January 2010, Farrell launched the Atonal Poetry Review, published by Atonal Press.

His poem "Had Schumann Lived" was published in di-vêrse´-city (AIPF; 2010). He also served as executive director of the Guadalupe Valley Poetry Celebration.
