= 2014 NCAA Division III men's ice hockey tournament =

- Teams: 11
- Finals site: Androscoggin Bank Colisée, Lewiston, Maine
- Champions: St. Norbert Green Knights (4th title)
- Runner-up: Wisconsin–Stevens Point Pointers (7th title game)
- Semifinalists: Geneseo State Knights (1st Frozen Four); Oswego State Lakers (8th Frozen Four)
- Winning coach: Tim Coghlin (4th title)
- MOP: Joe Perry (St. Norbert)
- Attendance: 10,575

The 2014 NCAA Division III Men's Ice Hockey Tournament was the culmination of the 2013–14 season, the 31st such tournament in NCAA history. It concluded with St. Norbert defeating Wisconsin–Stevens Point in the championship game 3-1. All first round and quarterfinal matchups were held at home team venues, while all succeeding games were played at the Androscoggin Bank Colisée in Lewiston, Maine.

For the first time since its inception in 1984, no team from ECAC West made the tournament.

== Qualifying teams ==
The following teams qualified for the tournament. Automatic bids were offered to the conference tournament champion of seven different conferences. Four at-large bids were available for the highest-ranked non-automatic qualifiers (overall seed in parentheses).

East							West						
Seed	School	Conference	Record	Berth Type	Appearance	Last Bid	Seed	School	Conference	Record	Berth Type	Appearance	Last Bid
1	Babson (2)	ECAC East	22–4–2	Tournament Champion	14th	2013	1	St. Norbert (1)	NCHA	25–3–1	Tournament Champion	15th	2013
2	Geneseo State (4)	SUNYAC	21–6–0	At–Large	4th	2006	2	St. Thomas (3)	MIAC	21–4–2	Tournament Champion	16th	2012
3	Norwich	ECAC East	19–6–3	At–Large	15th	2013	3	Wisconsin–Stevens Point	WIAC	22–5–2	At–Large	10th	1998
4	Oswego State	SUNYAC	20–6–2	Tournament Champion	13th	2013	4	Adrian	NCHA	22–2–4	At–Large	4th	2013
5	Bowdoin	NESCAC	17–8–2	Tournament Champion	6th	2013							
6	Salem State	MASCAC	16–9–2	Tournament Champion	7th	1995							
7	Nichols	ECAC Northeast	18–6–3	Tournament Champion	2nd	2009							

== Format ==
The tournament featured four rounds of play. All rounds were Single-game elimination. The top four ranked teams were arranged so that were they all to reach the national semifinal the first seed would play the fourth seed and the second seed would play the third seed.

Because the fifth- and sixth-ranked teams were both western schools, all four western teams were advanced to the quarterfinal round with the first western seed playing the fourth western seed and the second western seed playing the third western seed. With the remaining quarterfinal brackets made up entirely of eastern teams, they were matched according to their seedings. The first eastern team was advanced to the quarterfinal round, the second eastern seed played the seventh eastern seed, the third eastern seed played the sixth eastern seed and fourth eastern seed played the fifth eastern seed. The winner between the fourth- and fifth-seeded teams advanced to play the top eastern seed while the winner of the other two first round games met in the remaining quarterfinal match.

In the first round and quarterfinals the higher-seeded team served as host.

== Tournament Bracket ==
First Round; March 12–13
E2	Geneseo State (4)	3
E7	Nichols	2
E3	Norwich	8
E6	Salem State	2
E4	Oswego State	4
E5	Bowdoin	3

Quarterfinals; March 15–16
W1	St. Norbert (1)	7
W4	Adrian	2
E2	Geneseo State (4)	3
E3	Norwich	2
W2	St. Thomas (3)	0
W3	Wisconsin–Stevens Point	3
E1	Babson (2)	0
E4	Oswego State	3

Semifinals; March 21
W1	St. Norbert (1)	6
E2	Geneseo State (4)	2
W3	Wisconsin–Stevens Point	2
E4	Oswego State	1

National Championship; March 22
W1	St. Norbert (1)	3
W3	Wisconsin–Stevens Point	1

Note: * denotes overtime period(s)

== Results ==
=== First round ===
March 13, 2014; 5:00 PM	(E2) Geneseo State	3 – 2 (1–1, 1–0, 1–1)	(E7) Nichols	Ira S. Wilson Ice Arena – Geneseo, New York; Attendance: 1,400

Game reference

Nick Horrigan
Goalies
Alex Larson
Referees:
Mike Jones
Will O'Malley
Linesmen:
Frasier McIntyre
Jay Selbert

(Anthoine, Brown) Justin Scharfe (10) – 02:25	1–0
	1–1	16:08 – Tyler Beasley (13) (Sposit, Gularte)
(Ripple, Vit) Tyler Brickler (15) – PP – 35:18	2–1
(Anthoine, Brown) Connor Anthoine (2) – 42:10	3–1
	3–2	50:50 – Sean Fleming (13) (Strootman)

0 min
Penalties
6 min
48
Shots
33

March 12, 2014; 7:00 PM	(E3) Norwich	8 – 2 (3–1, 5–0, 0–1)	(E6) Salem State	Kreitzberg Arena – Holderness, New Hampshire; Attendance: 960

Game reference

Chris Czarnota
Parker Carroll
Goalies
Ryan Sutliffe
Referees:
Marty Hughes
Eric Doyle
Linesmen:
Mike Lizotte
Doug Place

(Whitell, Ermakov) Anthony Flaherty (4) – 05:21	1–0
(Thieda) Travis Janke (15) – 08:55	2–0
(Russell) Nick Pichette (6) – PP – 17:28	3–0
	3–1	18:03 – T.J. Hermans (1) (Bucci)
(Gorman, Thieda) Chris Duszynski (17) – 24:59	4–1
(Janke, Flaherty) Chris Duszynski (18) – PP – 26:02	5–1
(Whitell, Flaherty) Erik Lyrvall (2) – 29:24	6–1
(Gorman, Duszynski) Travis Janke (16) – 30:37	7–1
(Piacentini) Nick Pichette (7) – PP – 36:49	8–1
	8–2	59:09 – Eric Defelice (12) (Phelan, Hermans)

2 min
Penalties
8 min
35
Shots
14

March 13, 2014; 3:00 PM	(E4) Oswego State	4 – 3 (0–0, 1–1, 3–2)	(E5) Bowdoin	Campus Center Ice Arena – Oswego, New York; Attendance: 2,142

Game reference

Matt Zawadzki
Goalies
Max Fenkell
Referees:
Joe Carusone
Bob Collins
Linesmen:
Mike Mahaney
Vince Epping

(Galati, Rivait) Alex Botten (9) – 26:04	1–0
	1–1	16:08 – Jay Livermore (4) (Downey, Quinn)
	1–2	23:46 – Matt Rubinoff (13) (Strootman)
	1–3	46:32 – Harry Matheson (10) (Lockwood, Rubinoff)
(Hulshof) David Titanic (9) – 48:21	2–3
(Gertsakis) Mike Montagna (12) – 48:21	3–3
(Titanic) Alex Botten (10) – 57:40	4–3

6 min
Penalties
8 min
36
Shots
30

=== Quarterfinals ===
March 15, 2014; 7:05 PM	(W1) St. Norbert	7 – 2 (2–0, 3–0, 2–2)	(W4) Adrian	Cornerstone Community Center – Ashwaubenon, Wisconsin; Attendance: 1,458

Game reference

David Jacobson
Goalies
Scott Shackell
Referees:
Travis Ahlberg
Eric Smevoll
Linesmen:
Jon Haas
Mike Verdonck

(McDonald, Higgins) Joe Perry (20) – 14:11	1–0
(Perry, Bradshaw) Erik Cooper (11) – PP — 16:15	2–0
(Cooper, Higgins) Cullen Bradshaw (15) – PP – 25:03	3–0
(Baptista, Dougherty) Ross Pavek (5) – 27:10	4–0
(Rulevičius) Chris Rial (7) – 32:22	5–0
	5–1	49:32 – Kevin Balas (10) (Hoy, Gray)
(Cooper, Bradshaw) Michael Hill (18) – 51:22	6–1
	6–2	55:01 – PP – EA – Justin Basso (9) (Ranalli)
(Cooper, Higgins) Joe Perry (21) – PP – 56:23	7–2

16 min
Penalties
24 min
40
Shots
14

March 16, 2014; 3:00 PM	(E3) Geneseo State	3 – 2 (0–1, 1–1, 2–0)	(E6) Norwich	Ira S. Wilson Ice Arena – Geneseo, New York; Attendance: 1,504

Game reference

Nick Horrigan
Goalies
Chris Czarnota
Referees:
Mike Shay
Mike Jones
Linesmen:
Frasier McIntyre
Jayson Selbert

	0–1	19:59 – PP – Anthony Flaherty (5) (Gorman, Niezgoda)
	0–2	29:20 – Shane Gorman (9) (Whitell)
(Vit, Ripple) Tyler Brickler (16) – PP – 37:47	1–2
(Scharfe, Caradonna) Tyler Brickler (17) – PP – 41:34	2–2
(Collins, Solomon) Tyler Brickler (18) – 46:28	3–2

4 min
Penalties
8 min
25
Shots
37

March 15, 2014; 7:00 PM	(W2) St. Thomas	0 – 3 (0–0, 0–0, 0–3)	(W3) Wisconsin–Stevens Point	St. Thomas Ice Arena – Mendota Heights, Minnesota; Attendance: 805

Game reference

Drew Fielding
Goalies
Brandon Jaeger
Referees:
Tony Lancette
Jerry McLaughlin
Linesmen:
Mark Engstrom
Jeremey Kolbescher

0–1	46:17 – Alex Kromm (5) (Brooks, Grauer)
0–2	50:32 – Kyle Brodie (8) (Sharkey, Kalisz)
0–3	52:22 – Garrett Ladd (19) (Kolb, Cornellier)

4 min
Penalties
10 min
25
Shots
27

March 16, 2014; 3:00 PM	(E1) Babson	0 – 3 (0–2, 0–1, 0–0)	(E4) Oswego State	Babson Skating Center – Wellesley, Massachusetts; Attendance: 1,410

Game reference

Jamie Murray
Goalies
Matt Zawadzki
Referees:
Dan Murphy
C.J. Hanatin
Linesmen:
Anthony Kenney
Daniel Gosselin

0–1	13:58 – PP – Shawn Hulshof (9) (Gertsakis, Galati)
0–2	15:11 – Matt Galati (24) (Botten, Rivait)
0–3	24:59 – SH – Brandon Adams (10) (Bonner, Rivait)

12 min
Penalties
4 min
27
Shots
27

=== Semifinals ===
March 21, 2014; 7:05 PM	(W1) St. Norbert	6 – 2 (1–0, 3–2, 2–0)	(E2) Geneseo State	Androscoggin Bank Colisée – Lewiston, Maine; Attendance: 1,827

Game reference

David Jacobson
Goalies
Nick Horrigan

(Hoogenboom) Reid Campbell (3) – 05:23	1–0
Joe Perry (22) – PP – 22:56	2–0
	2–1	24:32 – Cam Hampson (1) (Stanimir, Brown)
	2–2	27:44 – PP – Justin Scharfe (11) (Ripple, Vit)
(Cooper) Michael Hill (19) – 37:29	3–2
(Bradshaw) Michael Hill (20) – 38:53	4–2
Joe Perry (23) – 56:48	5–2
(Perry, Fiala) Tyler Zepeda (9) – EN – 58:39	6–2

9 min
Penalties
16 min
44
Shots
27

March 21, 2014; 7:30 PM	(E3) Wisconsin–Stevens Point	2 – 1 (1–1, 1–0, 0–0)	(E6) Oswego State	Androscoggin Bank Colisée – Lewiston, Maine; Attendance: 1,827

Game reference

Brandon Jaeger
Goalies
Matt Zawadzki

	0–1	10:11 – Shawn Hulshof (10) (Titanic)
(Kalisz, Brodie) Kyle Sharkey (15) – 19:00	1–1
(Brooks, Krueger) Joe Kalisz (15) – PP – 37:01	2–1

6 min
Penalties
2 min
31
Shots
46

=== Semifinals ===
March 22, 2014; 7:00 PM	(W1) St. Norbert	3 – 1 (2–0, 0–0, 1–1)	(W3) Wisconsin–Stevens Point	Androscoggin Bank Colisée – Lewiston, Maine; Attendance: 1,851

Game reference

David Jacobson
Goalies
Brandon Jaeger

(Zepeda) Joe Perry (24) – 13:06	1–0
(Thompson, Hill) Erik Cooper (16) – 13:17	2–0
	2–1	24:32 – Garrett Ladd (20) (Kalisz, Gammage)
(Baptista) Marian Fiala (6) – 45:47	3–1

10 min
Penalties
10 min
29
Shots
24

== All-Tournament Team ==
- G: David Jacobson (St. Norbert)
- D: Marian Fiala (St. Norbert)
- D: Kyle Brodie (Wisconsin–Stevens Point)
- F: Joe Perry* (St. Norbert)
- F: Joe Kalisz (Wisconsin–Stevens Point)
- F: Shawn Hulshof (Oswego State)

* Most Outstanding Player(s)

== Record by conference ==
Conference	# of Bids	Record	Win %	Frozen Four	Championship Game	Champions
NCHA	2	3–1	.750	1	1	1
SUNYAC	2	4–2	.667	2	-	-
ECAC East	2	1–2	.333	-	-	-
WIAC	1	2–1	.667	1	1	-
NESCAC	1	0–1	.000	-	-	-
MIAC	1	0–1	.000	-	-	-
ECAC Northeast	1	0–1	.000	-	-	-
MASCAC	1	0–1	.000	-	-	-
