= Whiteside, Barnett and Co. Agricultural Works =

- U.S. National Register of Historic Places
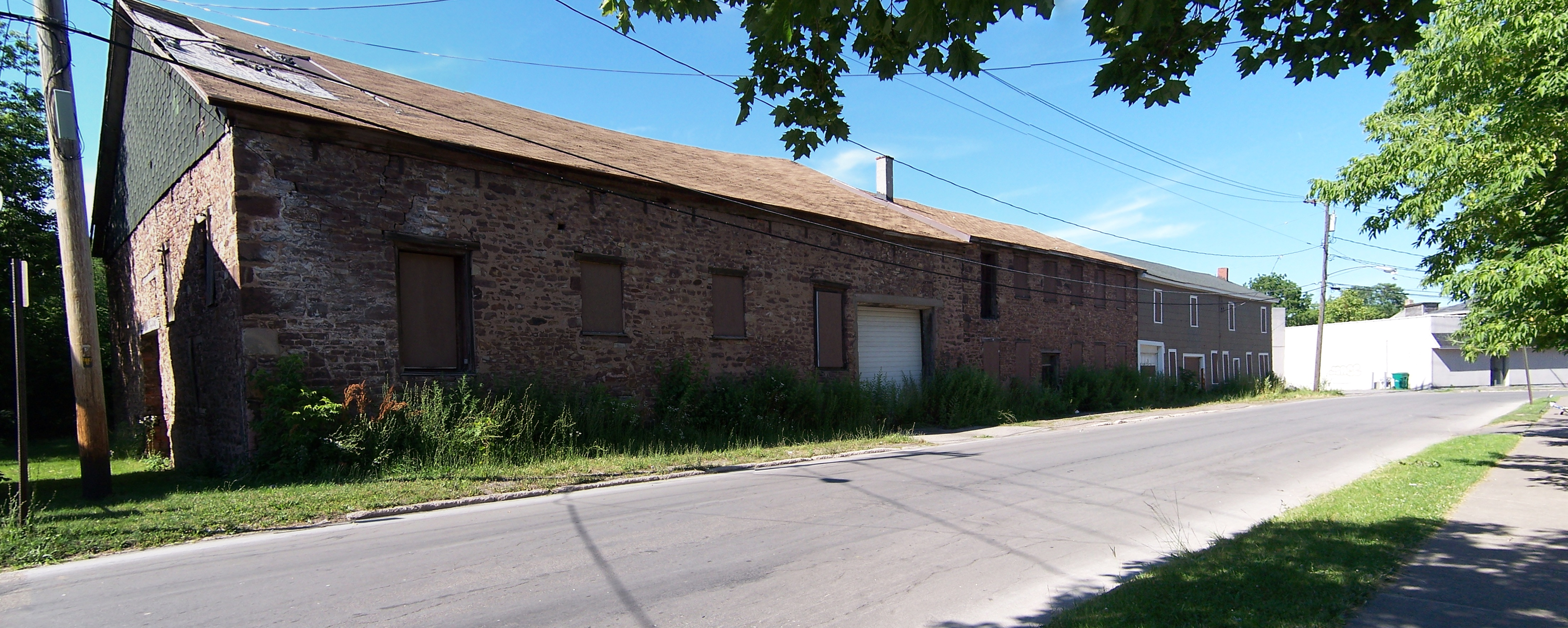
- Whiteside, Barnett and Co. Agricultural Works, July 2011

- Location within New York Location within the United States
- Location: 60 Clinton St., Brockport, New York
- Coordinates: 43°12′59.5″N 77°56′28.5″W
- Area: less than one acre
- Built: 1850
- Demolished: 2024
- NRHP reference No.: 00001157
- Added to NRHP: February 22, 2001

Whiteside, Barnett and Co. Agricultural Works, also known as Canal-Front Warehouse, was a historic factory and warehouse complex located at Brockport in Monroe County, New York. It was a largely intact and rare surviving example of the brownstone industrial building that once lined the banks of the Erie Canal at Brockport. It was the last surviving building related to the local reaper manufacturing industry. The buildings were built between 1850 and 1852 for the Agricultural Works in Brockport, later known as Whiteside, Barnett and Co. The property was later used as a lumberyard from about 1880 to 1904 and as a cannery until 1945.

It was listed on the National Register of Historic Places in 2001. In 2008, the property was purchased by a local development corporation called the Greater Brockport Development Corp (GBDC). Red Hook, Brooklyn developer Greg O'Connell, who had recently revitalized the business district of Mount Morris, New York, expressed an interest in the property in early 2014, feeling that it could spark a similar revitalization in Brockport. However, the Town of Sweden rejected a tax break plan and O'Connell declined to purchase the property. In 2024, the buildings were demolished after a storm caused the roof to collapse.
