= Adrianna Hungerford =

American temperance activist, leader (1858–1946)

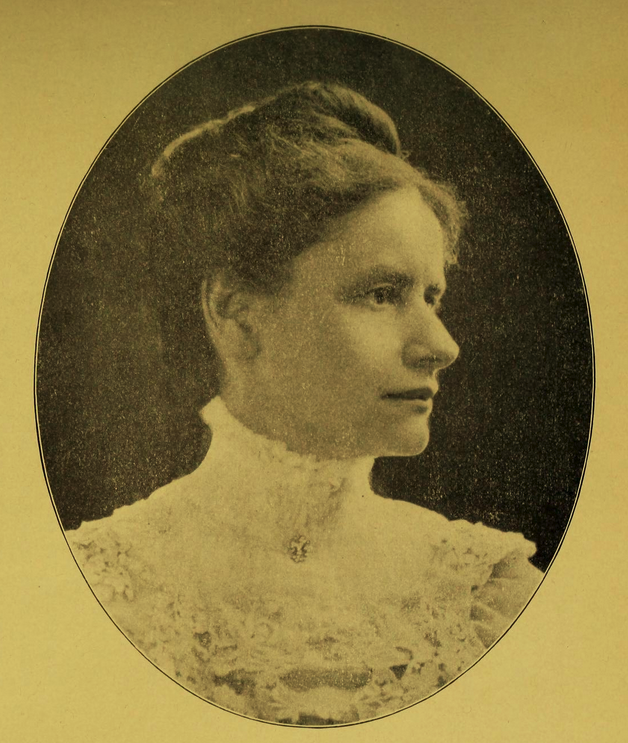
- Portrait from The passing of the saloon (1908)
- Born: Adrianna A. Baldwin; October 15, 1858; Short Tract, New York, U.S.
- Died: January 20, 1946 (aged 87); Denver, Colorado, U.S.
- Education: State University of New York at Geneseo
- Occupation: temperance activist
- Known for: President, Colorado State Woman's Christian Temperance Union
- Spouse: Stephen Edwin Hungerford (m. 1879; died 1939)

Adrianna Hungerford (née, Baldwin; 1858–1946) was an American temperance activist who served as President of the Colorado State Woman's Christian Temperance Union (WCTU), 1904–42.

== Early life and education ==
Adrianna A. Baldwin was born at Short Tract, New York, October 15, 1858.

She was educated in the public schools and at the State University of New York at Geneseo.

Although born and reared where there were no saloons and where drunkenness was rare, in early life, Hungerford developed a horror of saloons and their association with the liquor traffic.

== Career ==
In 1879, she married Dr. Stephen Edwin Hungerford (1849–1939), of Dansville, New York. In 1886, the couple settled in Boulder, Colorado, and ten years later (1896), they removed to Denver.

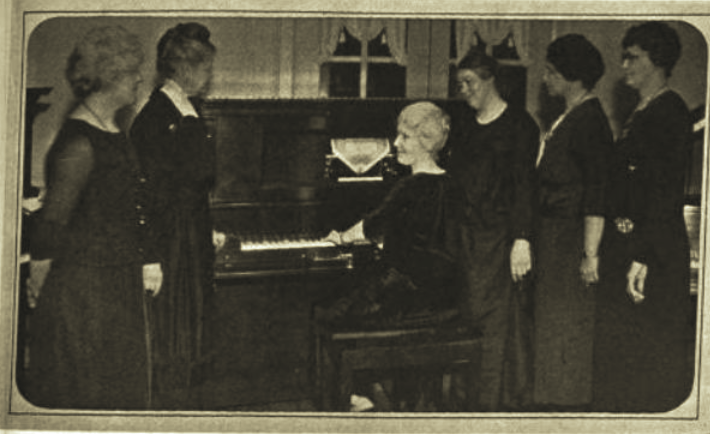
Colorado WCTU leaders, Hungerford is 2nd from the left (1923)

After becoming a resident of Colorado, Hungerford joined the WCTU, and became actively engaged in temperance work. She served as treasurer of the local Union at Boulder, and then as president of the Denver Union. She was later elected State superintendent of Legislation and Christian Citizenship, and among her activities in this position was a compilation of the State laws relating to the liquor traffic, with a view of making clear to the citizens in general and to women in particular what they might do under the law to protect themselves against the saloon issues. She was elected vice-president of the State Union in 1902, and president in 1904, retiring from the position in 1942.

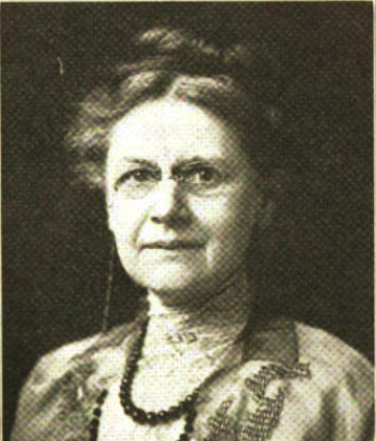
Portrait from Standard encyclopedia of the alcohol problem (1926)

Hungerford led the women of Colorado in three State-wide campaigns: the first in 1912, an educational and preparatory one for Constitutional Prohibition; the second in 1914; and the third in 1910. She also had a prominent part in committee work in the National WCTU. She specialized on legislation and law enforcement, and she maintained close relationship with the State and Federal enforcement officers.

== Personal life ==
They had a son, Leo.

Adrianna Hungerford died in Denver, January 20, 1946.
