= Jeff Clarke (businessman) =

American businessman and CEO (born 1961)

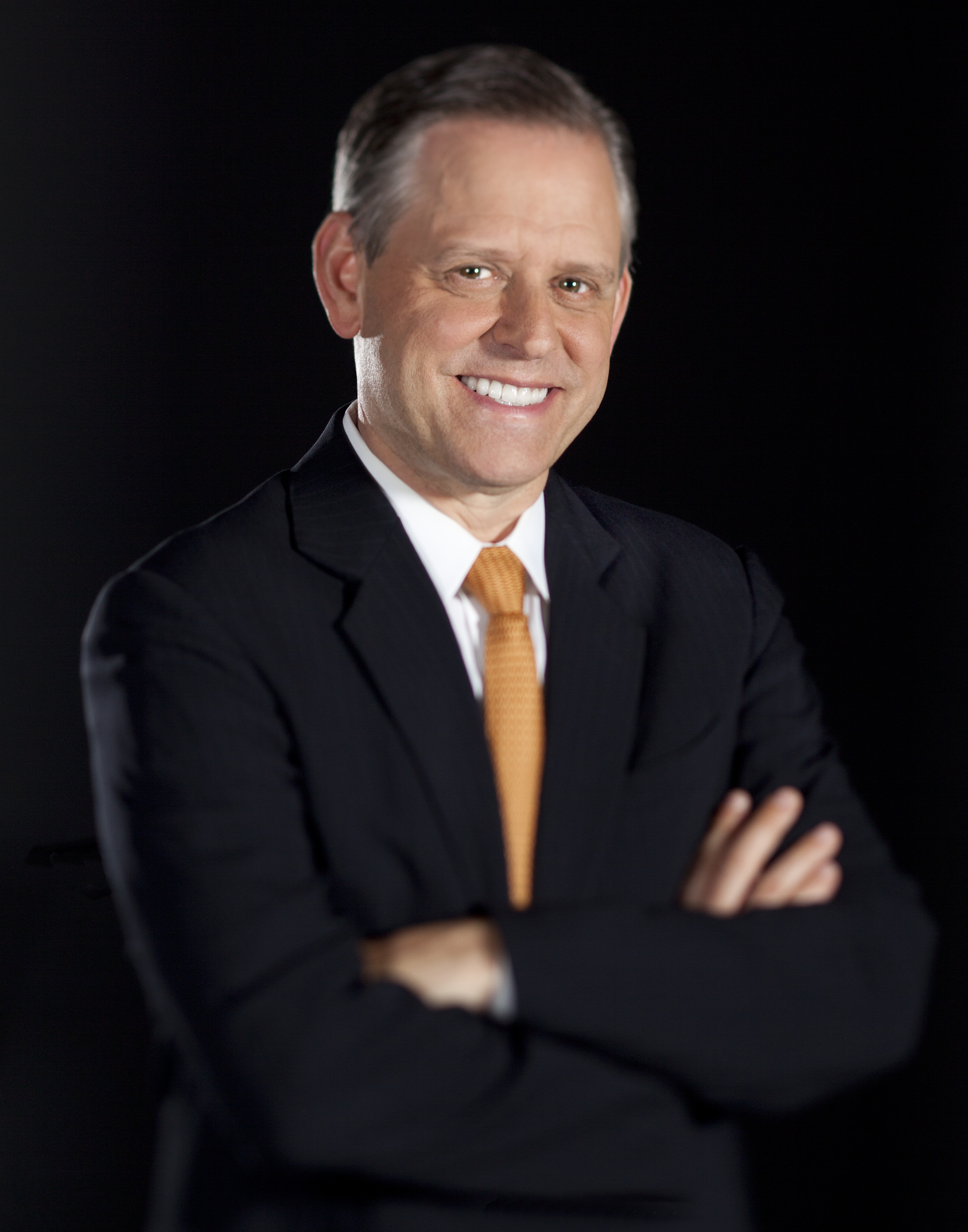
- Born: July 1961 (age 65); Ithaca, New York, U.S.
- Education: SUNY Geneseo (BA); Northeastern University (MBA)
- Occupation: Business executive
- Years active: 1985–present
- Known for: CEO of Avaya, CEO of Kodak, executive chairman of FTD LLC
- Title: Chief executive officer of Avaya

Jeffrey J. Clarke (born July 1961 in Ithaca, New York) is an American business executive who is chief executive officer of Avaya. He previously was chief executive officer of Insurity, Doxim, Eastman Kodak Company and Travelport, and executive chairman and interim chief executive officer of FTD LLC.

== Early life and education ==
Clarke was born in Ithaca and grew up in Hamilton, New York. He graduated from SUNY Geneseo in 1983 with a Bachelor of Arts degree in economics. He earned a Master of Business Administration from Northeastern University in 1985.

== Career ==
=== Digital Equipment, Compaq, Hewlett-Packard and Computer Associates ===
Clarke began his career at Digital Equipment Corporation (DEC) in 1985. During his time there, he held management positions in international operations, finance and manufacturing. He joined Compaq after it acquired DEC in 1998 and was appointed Compaq's chief financial officer in March 2001.

After Hewlett-Packard acquired Compaq in 2002, Clarke became executive vice president of global operations at HP. He was responsible for the company's worldwide supply chain, manufacturing, procurement and internet operations, and co-led the integration of HP and Compaq. He left HP in November 2003.

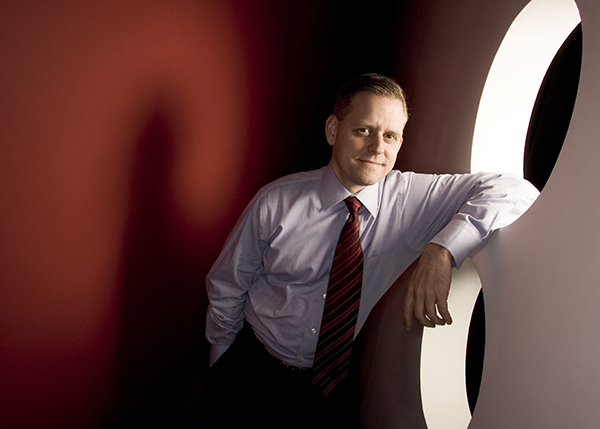
Clarke as chief operating officer of Computer Associates in 2005

Clarke joined Computer Associates as chief financial officer in March 2004 and was named chief operating officer and chief financial officer the following month. As chief operating officer, he was responsible for sales, services, distribution, corporate finance, mergers and acquisitions, information technology, and corporate strategy and planning. He remained at CA until 2006.

=== Cendant and Travelport ===
In April 2006, Cendant named Clarke president and chief executive officer of its travel distribution services division, which was being separated from Cendant as Travelport. Later that year, an affiliate of The Blackstone Group agreed to acquire Travelport for approximately US$4.3 billion.

As Travelport's chief executive, Clarke reorganized its 21 constituent companies into three principal businesses: Galileo, Orbitz Worldwide and Gullivers Travel Associates. Travelport agreed to acquire the reservation-system company Worldspan for US$1.4 billion in late 2006, with Clarke overseeing the integration planning. He also led Orbitz Worldwide's initial public offering in July 2007 and was chairman of Orbitz from 2007 to 2014.

Clarke was Travelport's chief executive until June 2011. He returned as chairman in February 2012 and held that position until May 2013, after which he remained a director and chaired its audit committee.

=== Augusta Columbia Capital and Kodak ===
In 2012, Clarke co-founded Augusta Columbia Capital, a private investment firm focused on middle-market technology and technology-enabled companies, and became a managing partner. On March 12, 2014, Eastman Kodak elected him chief executive officer and a member of its board, several months after the company had emerged from Chapter 11 bankruptcy protection.

During Clarke's tenure, Kodak sought support from the motion-picture industry to continue manufacturing celluloid film. Directors including Martin Scorsese, Quentin Tarantino, Christopher Nolan and J. J. Abrams publicly supported continued production. In February 2015, Kodak finalized supply agreements with six major Hollywood studios for motion-picture film.

Kodak reported net earnings of US$16 million for 2016, compared with a US$75 million loss in 2015, although annual revenue declined by 10 percent. In November 2018, Kodak agreed to sell its Flexographic Packaging Division to Montagu Private Equity for as much as US$390 million, with proceeds intended to reduce debt. Clarke stepped down as chief executive on February 20, 2019, after nearly five years in the role.

=== FTD and E.Merge ===
Following the acquisition of FTD's consumer and florist businesses by an affiliate of Nexus Capital Management in August 2019, Clarke was named executive chairman of FTD LLC. He also was interim chief executive officer and remained executive chairman through 2020.

From 2020 to 2022, Clarke was co-chief executive officer, chief financial officer and a director of E.Merge Technology Acquisition Corp., a special-purpose acquisition company focused on software and internet technology businesses. Its initial public offering raised approximately US$600 million. E.Merge did not complete a business combination and announced that it would dissolve and liquidate effective September 4, 2022.

=== Doxim, Insurity and Avaya ===
Doxim appointed Clarke interim chief executive officer on November 3, 2022. He remained in that role until Mike Hennessy became chief executive in February 2024, when Clarke continued as executive chairman of Doxim.

Clarke was named chief executive officer of Insurity in January 2025. On June 30, 2026, Insurity appointed Jatin Atre to succeed him as chief executive, and Clarke continued with the company as executive chairman.

On August 3, 2026, Avaya appointed Clarke chief executive officer. He succeeded Patrick Dennis, who became executive chairman.

== Board membership and honors ==
Clarke was chairman of Orbitz Worldwide from 2007 to 2014 and chairman of Travelport from 2012 to 2013. He has also been on the boards of Red Hat, Compuware, Autodesk and Docker. He rejoined Travelport's board of directors in January 2024.

Clarke has been on the Geneseo Foundation board of directors. He joined Northeastern University's board of trustees in 2013.

In 2015, AACSB International included Clarke in its Influential Leaders recognition program. In May 2026, SUNY Geneseo awarded him an honorary doctorate.
