= Laurie Beechman Theatre =

Dinner theater in Manhattan, New York

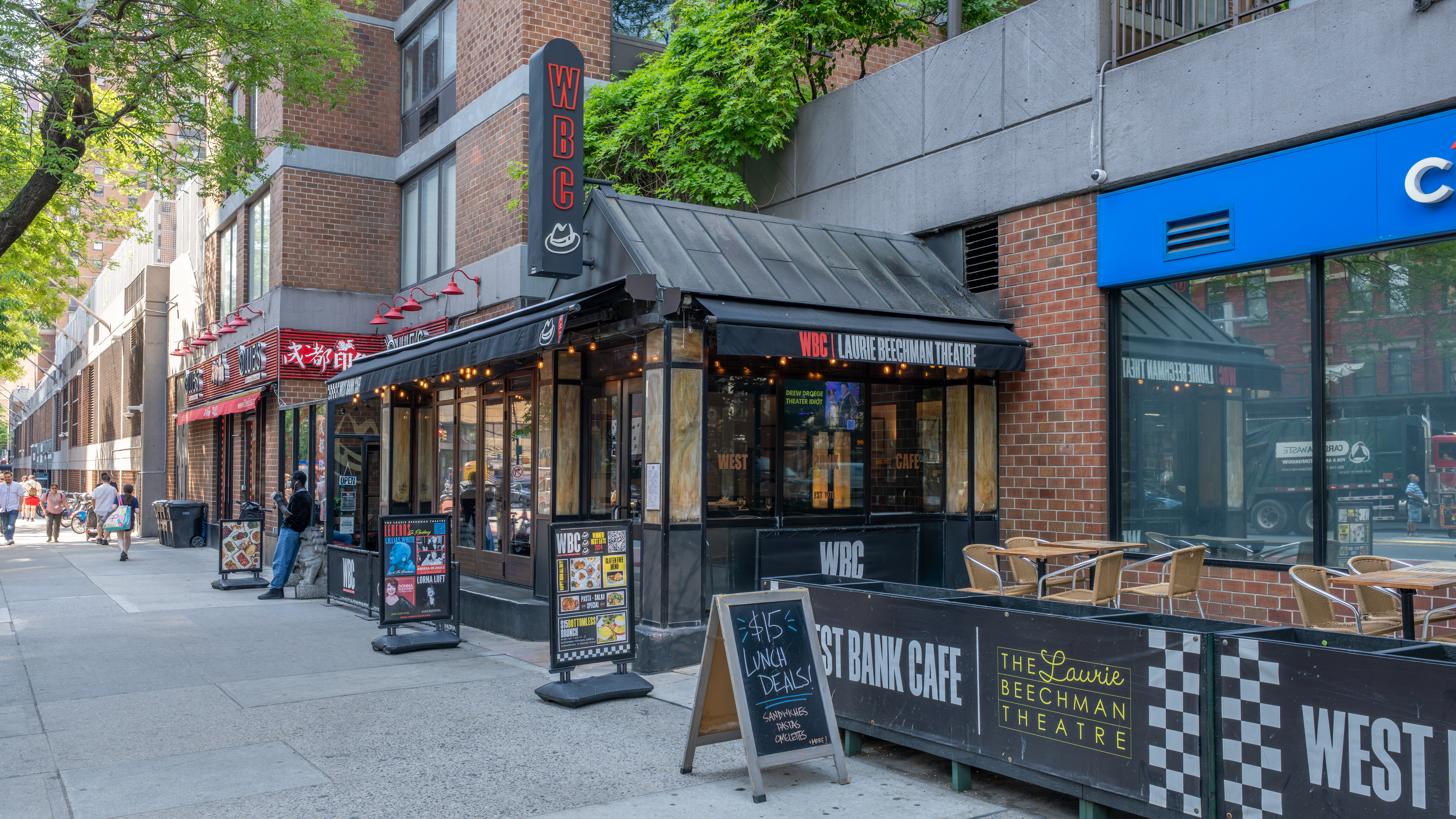
- (2026)
- Interactive map of Laurie Beechman Theatre
- Address: 407 West 42nd Street
- Location: Manhattan, New York, United States
- Coordinates: 40°45′31″N 73°59′34″W
- Owner: Tom D'angora
- Capacity: 80
- Type: Cabaret

Construction
- Opened: 1983

Website
- www.westbankcafe.com/beechman_theatre.html

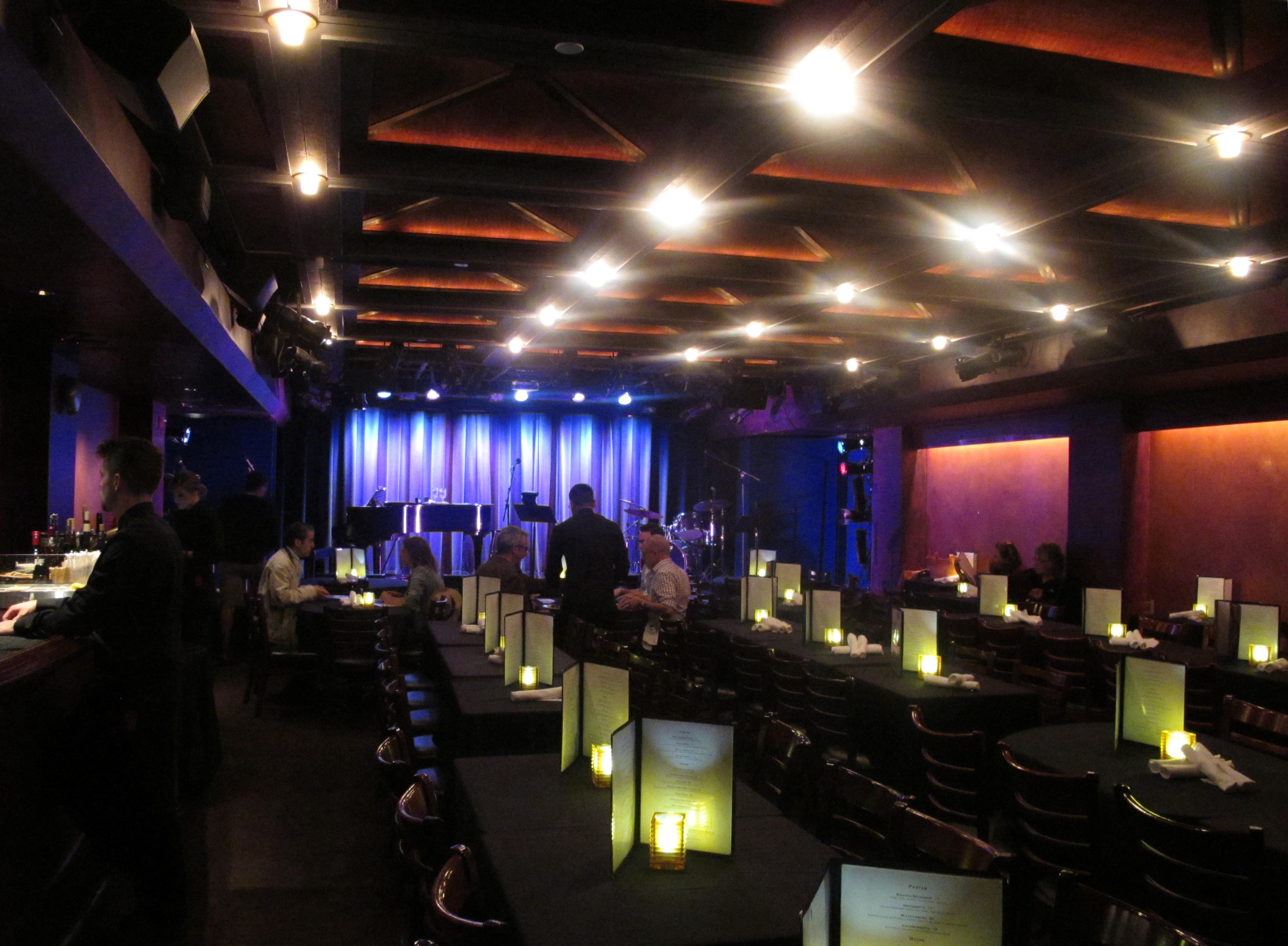
Interior of the Laurie Beechman Theatre prior to a show on October 9, 2014

The Laurie Beechman Theatre (formerly the West Bank Cafe Downstairs Theater Bar) is a 90-seat dinner theater in the basement of the West Bank Cafe at 407 West 42nd Street in the Manhattan Plaza apartment complex in Hell's Kitchen, Manhattan, New York City.

The theater is named for Laurie Beechman, who was a Broadway singer/actor and cabaret performer.

== History ==
The theater was opened in 1983 by the West Bank Cafe owner Steve Olsen. The cafe/theater is in Manhattan Plaza, which was specifically built to house people who are active in New York's theater scene. Bruce Willis was a bartender in the restaurant. Tennessee Williams, Arthur Miller and Sean Penn were regulars. In the 1990s it was a favorite hangout of Austin Pendleton, John Heard and John Patrick Shanley.

Olsen experimented with the venue, offering it for jazz and cabaret. Lewis Black, Rand Foerster, and Rusty Magee proposed staging plays at what initially was called the West Bank Cafe Downstairs Theater Bar. Over the course of 14 years, Foerster was the artistic director, Black was the playwright in residence, and authored forty plays there, and Magee was the musical director. More than 1,500 one-act plays have been performed at the theater.

Initially, the theater was strictly drinks only. However, it has evolved to include dinner before the show. Joan Rivers often performed there, as has Karen Finley.

On August 27, 2014, Joan Rivers gave her final performance at the theater. The following day, Rivers suffered a cardiac arrest resulting from complications during a procedure on her vocal cords, and died on September 4, 2014.

On Christmas Day 2020, the Cafe ran a telethon to raise needed funds to stay open. Among the notable performers who appeared on the program were Matthew Broderick, Al Pacino, Betty Buckley, Nathan Lane, André De Shields, Marissa Mulder, Pete Townshend, and the Manhattan Borough President Gale Brewer. The telethon raised its target of $250,000 within the first ninety minutes of the show.

Tom and Michael D'Angora acquired the theater in December 2024, and the theater was temporarily closed after being acquired. The space reopened on January 23, 2025. David Rockwell was hired in early 2025 to renovate the theater.

On February 22, 2026, after a blizzard prevented the final performance of Operation Mincemeat’s original Broadway cast, the space hosted a free performance broadcast over the show's official Instagram Live account. In April 2026, the theater began hosting The Star To Be Project initiative, providing funding for rising artists.

== See also ==
- List of dinner theaters
