= Laurie Beechman =

American singer (1953-1998)

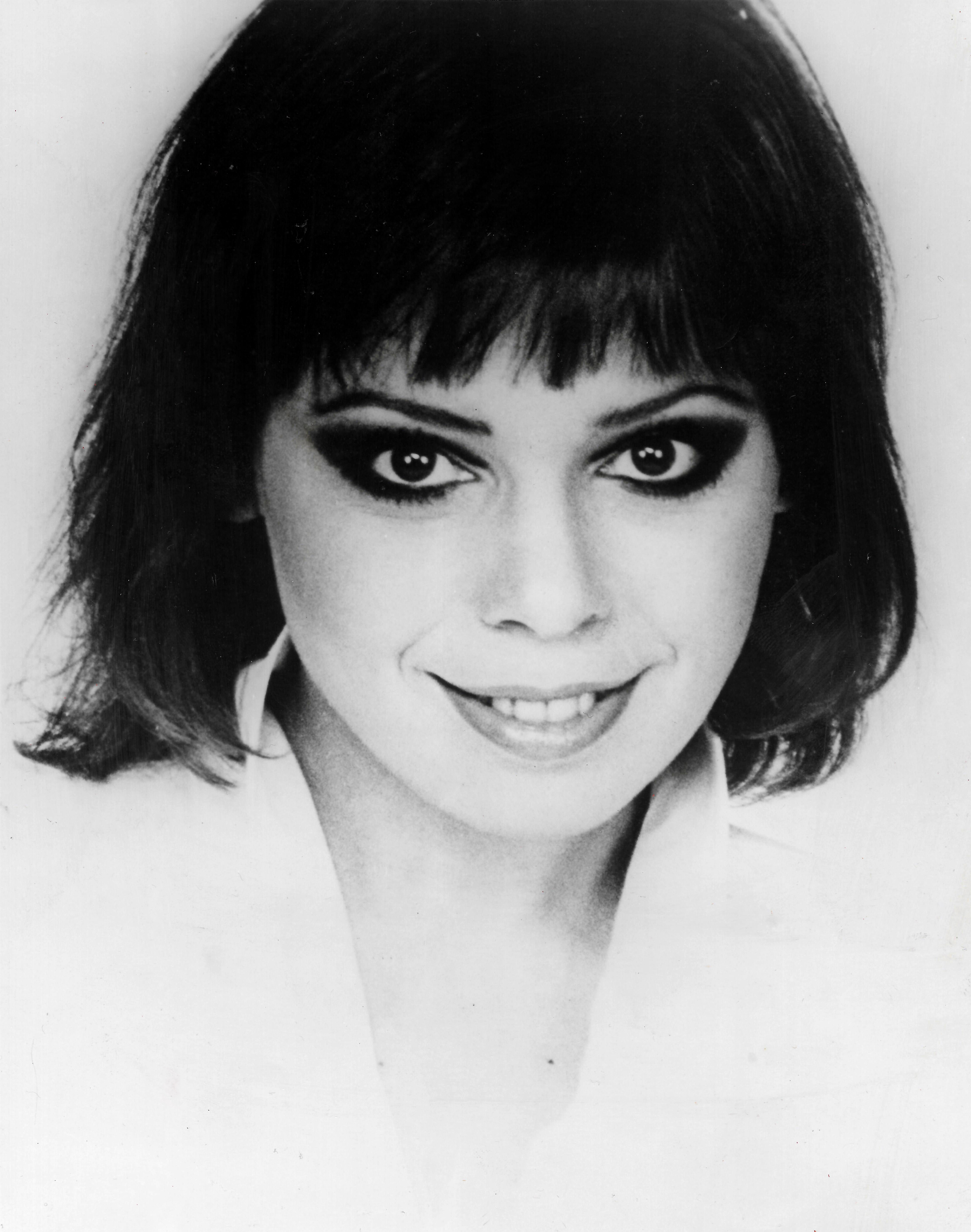

Background information
- Born: Laurie Hope Beechman; April 4, 1953; Philadelphia, Pennsylvania, U.S.
- Died: March 8, 1998 (aged 44) White Plains, New York, U.S.
- Occupation: Singer
- Instrument: Vocals
- Years active: 1977–1998

Laurie Hope Beechman (April 4, 1953 – March 8, 1998) was an American actress and singer, known for her work in Broadway musicals. She also had a career as a cabaret performer and recording artist. After her death, the West Bank Cafe Downstairs Theater Bar in New York was renamed the Laurie Beechman Theatre.

Beechman made her Broadway debut in the 1977 original production of Annie. For her role as the narrator in the 1982 original Broadway production of Joseph and the Amazing Technicolor Dreamcoat, she was nominated for the Tony Award for Best Featured Actress in a Musical. She then went on to be the first actress to play the role of Grizabella in the US national touring production of Cats in 1983, before replacing Betty Buckley in the Broadway production in 1984. She would play the role on Broadway for over four years. She also starred in the Broadway productions of The Pirates of Penzance (1981) and Les Misérables (1990) and returned to the role of Grizabella for four months in 1997, when Cats became the longest running musical in Broadway history.

== Early life ==
Beechman was born in Philadelphia, Pennsylvania. After moving to Haddon Township, New Jersey, she graduated in 1971 from Haddon Township High School.

She performed in an acoustic folk-rock group with Rick Ferrante and Roy Baker called The Destiny Trio during the summers of 1971 and 1972 in North Wildwood, NJ, at a small club called the Manor Lounge. She subsequently enrolled at New York University. Dropping out of NYU after a few years, Beechman made her Broadway debut in 1977 as part of the original cast of Annie, playing five different roles. This led to small roles in the Public Theater's production of The Pirates of Penzance and the 1979 film version of Hair.

A detour into rock and roll resulted in the 1980 Atlantic Records release Laurie and the Sighs. With little support from a new management team at the label, the album failed badly and Beechman was looking for stage work.

== Broadway career ==
Beechman made her Broadway debut in the original Broadway cast of Annie. She played various roles, most notably "Star to Be", a role which was written for her after the creative team heard her powerful voice, and she is credited in the original Broadway cast recording.

She played the lead role of the Narrator in the original Broadway cast of Joseph and the Amazing Technicolor Dreamcoat during its first Broadway production in 1982, earning a Tony Award nomination for Best Actress (Featured Role - Musical) and a Theatre World Award.

In December 1983, Beechman headed the First National Company of Cats as "Grizabella, The Glamour Cat" when the tour opened in Boston. Within four months, she assumed the role on Broadway, replacing Tony winner Betty Buckley. Beechman stayed with the show for more than four years and made occasional return engagements over the next decade.

Set to take over the role of Fantine in the touring production of Les Misérables, Beechman was diagnosed with stage 3 ovarian cancer in 1989 after scheduling a CT scan for abdominal pain. After months of treatment, she performed in a cabaret act at New York's Ballroom, and later a new production of Joseph and the Amazing Technicolor Dreamcoat at the Walnut Street Theatre.

In early 1990, Beechman debuted as Fantine in the Broadway production of Les Misérables. She stayed for several months, eventually heading out on tour where she played the role in Philadelphia that December. During this time, her self-produced solo recording, Listen To My Heart, was successfully released. The following fall she celebrated regaining her health after fighting off a recurrence of her cancer by returning to the Ballroom.

== Personal life and death ==
After an ovarian cancer diagnosis in 1989, Beechman underwent a hysterectomy, appendectomy, and chemotherapy. Beechman married Neil Mazzella in 1992, recorded three more solo albums, performed concerts, sang "You'll Never Walk Alone" at President Bill Clinton's second inaugural gala, was awarded the Gilda's Club's "It's Always Something" Award, and returned to acting. In 1992, she had surgery to remove a tumor near her adrenal glands. In early 1995, Beechman's cancer returned. She spent an hour on The Phil Donahue Show singing and discussing her condition.

Beechman returned to play Grizabella on Broadway for the ninth (1991) and tenth (1992) anniversary performances of Cats, and again from May to September 1997.

Although her treatments were ongoing, Beechman continued performing until just a few months before her death on March 8, 1998, at age 44. One month later, a memorial service was held for her at the Winter Garden Theatre, the theatre where Cats played for many years. She was survived by her mother, Dolly Beechman Schnall, stepfather, Dr. Nate Schnall, two sisters, Claudia Beechman Cohen and Jane Beechman Segal, and husband, Neil Mazzella. She was buried at Montefiore Cemetery in Rockledge, Pennsylvania.

== Legacy ==
The Laurie Beechman Theatre on 42nd Street in New York City is named for her. The Laurie Beechman Cabaret at University of the Arts in Philadelphia is also named for her. In 1999, a year after her death, a scholarship was established in her name at the University of the Arts Musical Theatre Department. She recorded three albums after Listen to My Heart: The Time Between the Time, The Andrew Lloyd Webber Album and No One is Alone: Songs of Hope and Inspiration From Broadway. She recorded a track, Jacques Brel's "If We Only Have Love", with her sister, Claudia Beechman, and another, a medley from Leonard Bernstein's "Candide" and "West Side Story", with Sam Harris. In 1997, the Westmont Theatre presented a sold-out evening of tributes to Beechman, who was in attendance. In 2023, the theater stage at Haddon Township High School, N.J., Beechman's alma mater, was named for her during a public ceremony followed by a student performance of "Joseph and the Amazing Technicolor Dreamcoat."

== Stage credits ==
Year	Title	Role	Notes
1976	Annie	Ensemble	Goodspeed Opera House
1977	Annie	Star-to-Be, ensemble	Broadway debut
1981	The Pirates of Penzance	Swing	Broadway
1981	The Pirates of Penzance	Kate	Broadway replacement
1981	Joseph and the Amazing Technicolor Dreamcoat	Narrator	Off-Broadway
1982	Joseph and the Amazing Technicolor Dreamcoat	Narrator	Broadway
1983	Cats	Grizabella	National tour
1984	Cats	Grizabella	Broadway replacement
1986	Carrie	Miss Gardner	Workshop reading
1988	Dangerous Music	Performer	Burt Reynolds Jupiter Theatre
1989	Les Misérables	Fantine	First national tour replacement
1990	Les Misérables	Fantine	Broadway replacement
1992	Funny Girl	Fanny Brice	Sacramento Music Circus
1996	Les Misérables	Fantine	Third national tour replacement
1997	Cats	Grizabella	Broadway replacement

== Filmography ==
Year	Title	Role	Notes
1976	Gypsy in My Soul	Singer	TV movie, uncredited
1977	The Annie Christmas Show	Ensemble	TV special
1977	The Fourth King	Feathers, the sparrow (voice)	TV movie
1979	Hair	"Black Boys" performer	
1982	The Royal Romance of Charles and Diana	Performer: "Will He Like Me?" Performer: "The Turning World"	TV movie
1994	Death Wish: The Face of Death	Performer: "What Was I Dreamin' Of...?"	
2003	Listen to Her Heart: The Life and Music of Laurie Beechman	Self (archival)	Documentary

== Discography ==
Year	Title
1980	Laurie and the Sighs
1990	Listen To My Heart
1993	Time Between the Time
1995	The Andrew Lloyd-Webber Album
1996	No One Is Alone

== Awards ==
Year	Award	Category	Nominated work	Result	Ref.
1982	Tony Awards	Best Featured Actress in a Musical	Joseph and the Amazing Technicolor Dreamcoat	Nominated	
1982	Drama Desk Award	Drama Desk Award for Outstanding Featured Actress in a Musical	Joseph and the Amazing Technicolor Dreamcoat	Nominated	
1982	Theatre World Award		Joseph and the Amazing Technicolor Dreamcoat	Won	
