= My Hang V. Huynh =

Vietnamese-American chemist

My Hang Huynh
- Born: 1962 (age 63–64)
- Education: SUNY Geneseo; University at Buffalo, The State University of New York
- Awards: Ernest Lawrence Award; MacArthur Fellows Program
- Scientific career
- Fields: Chemistry
- Workplaces: Los Alamos National Laboratory

My Hang V. Huynh (born 1962) is a Vietnamese-American chemist in the High Explosives Science and Technology Group at Los Alamos National Laboratory. Huynh's research has led to the creation of "Green Primary Explosives" which are "designed to replace traditional mercury and lead-based explosives and reduce damaging side-effects to the environment and human health."

== Life ==
Huynh received degrees from SUNY Geneseo (B.A. and B.S.) and SUNY Buffalo (Ph.D.) in 1991 and 1998 respectively. In 2007 Huynh received two major awards in recognition of her work: the E.O. Lawrence Award for exceptional contributions to the national, economic and energy security of the United States, and she was named to the MacArthur Fellows Program; an award known as the "genius grant."

Outlining her work, the MacArthur Foundation explained the significance of her findings:

The thermodynamic properties of substances she has synthesized make them remarkably stable under a wide temperature range, and their structure allows the substitution of toxic heavy metals such as lead or mercury with more benign elements like copper and iron. Moreover, the methods that she has developed highlight the potential for nitrogen-based reaction centers to serve as the backbone in the synthesis of complex molecules, challenging the orthodoxy of synthetic approaches based on covalent carbon bonding in organic chemistry. Huynh's advances also promise to improve the safety of workers, such as miners and military personnel, who are chronically exposed to energetic materials. In addition, the large amount of inert nitrogen gas generated in the detonation of her novel compounds suggests the possibility of new safety applications, including fire prevention in malfunctioning jet engines and improved air bag design.
