= Rita K. Gollin =

American literature scholar (1928–2022)

Rita Gollin
- Born: Rita Kaplan; January 22, 1928; Brooklyn, New York
- Died: August 7, 2022 (aged 94)
- Occupation: Professor of English

Academic background
- Education: University of Minnesota; Queens College

Academic work
- Discipline: American literature
- Institutions: SUNY Geneseo; University of Minnesota; University of Rochester
- Main interests: Nathaniel Hawthorne

Rita Kaplan Gollin (January 22, 1928 – August 7, 2022) was a professor of English and a scholar of American literature.

== Life and career ==
Rita Gollin was born Rita Kaplan on January 22, 1928, in Brooklyn, NY. She graduated magna cum laude from Queens College with a B.A. in English in 1949, and received her M.A. in English from the University of Minnesota in 1950. She earned her doctorate in English from the same university in 1961 under Professor C. H. Foster.

She was a professor in the English Department at the State University of New York at Geneseo from 1967 to 2002, where she was named Distinguished Professor in 1995. Before that, she taught at the University of Minnesota and the University of Rochester.

She was a scholar of the life and works of Nathaniel Hawthorne, on whom she has authored several books and many articles. Her 1979 book, Nathaniel Hawthorne and the Truth of Dreams, published by the Louisiana State University Press, is consistently included in Hawthorne bibliographies. Her later publications pursued visual-textual studies, focusing on the iconography of Hawthorne portraiture, and a biography of Hawthorne's publisher's wife, "Annie Adams Fields, Woman of Letters." She also edited scholarly editions of Hawthorne's The Scarlet Letter.

She received grants from the National Endowment for the Humanities (NEH), as well as the Grace Ellis Ford Fellowship from the AAUW and a State University of New York Research Foundation Fellowship. She was president of the Nathaniel Hawthorne Society from 1981 to 1982 and of the Northeast Modern Language Association of America (MLA) from 1978 to 1979.

== Personal life ==
She married Dick Gollin in 1950. They lived in Rochester, New York, and had three children; their son Michael died of ALS. She died at 94 on August 7, 2022.

== Legacy ==
Upon her retirement in 2002, Gollin endowed the Department of English at SUNY Geneseo with the Rita K. Gollin Scholarship for Excellence in American Literature. The award goes to one graduating senior and one junior who have demonstrated excellence in the study of American literature.
