= David Klein (Constellation Brands) =

American businessman

David Klein is an American businessman. He is currently the CEO of Canopy Growth and a member of the company's executive management committee.

== Education and career ==
Klein received a bachelor's degree in economics at the State University of New York at Geneseo and his MBA from SUNY Buffalo. In 2004, Klein joined Constellation brands as vice president of business development. He also held roles as CFO of Constellation Europe; SVP, treasurer & controller; and CFO, Beer Division. He was named CFO of Constellation Brands in June 2015.
