= Marissa Mulder =

American singer and cabaret artist

Marissa Mulder is an American singer and cabaret artist.

== Biography ==
Raised in Syracuse, New York, Mulder is a 2007 graduate of Suny Geneseo.

She is perhaps best known for her renditions of selections from the Lennon & McCartney songbook. She has also drawn acclaim for her show of songs by Tom Waits at the Metropolitan Room, which Stephen Holden writing the New York Times in 2013 called. “Far and away the season’s best cabaret show, everything the genre can be and almost never is". Mulder is a recipient both of a "Noel Coward award" and the "Julie Wilson award". Also in 2014 she garnered the "Major Artist" and "Best Recording" trophies for "Tom ... In His Words: The Songs of Tom Waits" at the 28th MAC Awards.

Her vocal style has been compared to that of Blossom Dearie. Among the venues she plays at are Feinstein's/54 Below and the West Bank Cafe.
