= Blanche Jennings Thompson =

American author (1887–1983)

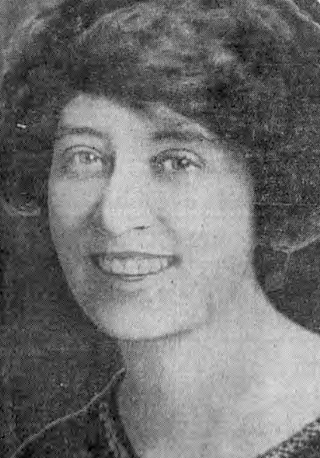
- Born: March 16, 1887; Geneseo, New York, US
- Died: September 20, 1983 (aged 96); Rochester, New York
- Education: Geneseo Normal School
- Occupations: Writer, editor, teacher

Blanche Jennings Thompson (March 16, 1887 – September 20, 1983) was an American editor, children's author and educator who wrote 32 books; her first, Silver Pennies, was very popular and sold over 350,000 copies.

== Teacher ==
Thompson was born in Geneseo, New York. After graduating from Geneseo Normal School in 1908 at age 21, Thompson joined the teaching staff at Benjamin Franklin High School in Rochester, where she eventually became the head of the English Department. She used phonics to teach children how to read, and advocated for more use of copying at school from an early age, calling it an important "minor language skill".

Later in her career, Thompson moved back to Geneseo and joined the teaching staff of her alma mater, the Geneseo Normal School, where she stayed until her retirement. She was also Senior Lecturer In Education and English at University of Rochester.

== Editor and author ==
In the 1920s, Thompson became interested in 20th-century American poets like Sara Teasdale, Robert Frost, Carl Sandburg, Amy Lowell, and Lizette Woodworth Reese. Thompson felt that young children should be exposed to modern poetry from an early age, but the works of these poets were only published in books marketed to adults, and only as whole works, not as excerpts. In 1925, Thompson created a small anthology of poetry for children called Silver Pennies that featured excerpted works of modern poets, with illustrations by Winifred Bromhall. Thompson sold the publishing rights to the MacMillan Company of New York for only $600. The book was an immediate hit, and over the next 40 years, was reprinted 32 times, selling over 350,000 copies. The American Library Association included Silver Pennies on its list of the hundred best children's books.

Thompson started to write her own stories for children, and produced 30 books. She was a devoted Catholic, and some of her books were hagiographies or had religious themes. She also produced a second anthology of poetry, More Silver Pennies (1949).

== Personal life ==
Thompson travelled widely during her life but never married. In 1971, age 84, she moved to a seniors' home in Rochester, where she lived for the next 12 years until her death in 1983 at age 96.
