= Tyler Brickler =

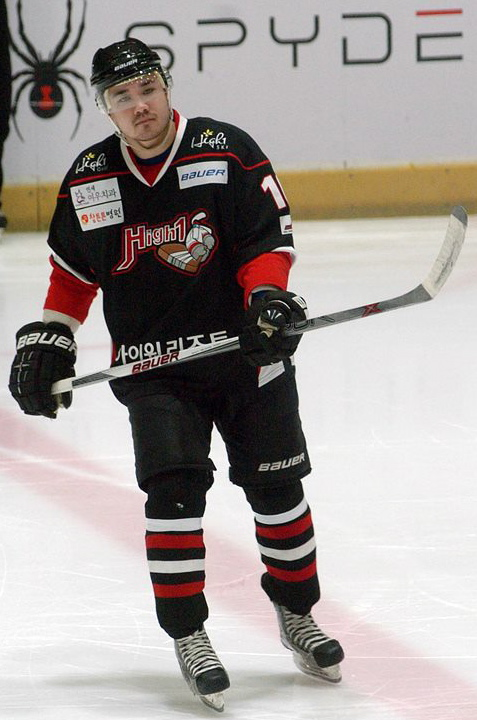
- Born: January 27, 1991 (age 35) Chicago, IL, United States
- Height: 6 ft 0 in (183 cm)
- Weight: 183 lb (83 kg; 13 st 1 lb)
- Position: Forward
- Shot: Left
- team: Free agent
- Played for: High1; Dundee Stars
- Playing career: 2015–2017

Tyler Brickler (born January 27, 1991) is an American former professional ice hockey player who last played for the Dundee Stars in the Elite Ice Hockey League (EIHL). Brickler previously played for High1 in the Asia League Ice Hockey (AL).

== Playing career ==
Brickler was born in Chicago, Illinois to an American father and a South Korean mother. Brickler played minor ice hockey for the Chicago Mission, before being selected by the USA Hockey National Team Development Program (NTDP) Final 40 Camp Roster. After attending the camp, Brickler signed as a free agent to play for the Lincoln Stars in the USHL and was selected by current Tampa Bay Lightning head coach Jon Cooper to play for the USA U17 National Team in the Ivan Hlinka Memorial Five Nations Tournament in Prague, Czech Republic, where the team won silver. Brickler then continued to play for the Green Mountain Glades (EJHL), the Sioux City Musketeers (USHL), and the Westside Warriors (BCHL), before playing NCAA Division I Ice Hockey for the UMass Lowell River Hawks in the Hockey East Conference. He then transferred to the State University of New York - SUNY Geneseo where he played NCAA Division III Ice Hockey for the remainder of his college career in the State University of New York Athletic Conference (SUNYAC). Brickler was the top scorer for his team the last two seasons and led SUNY Geneseo to their first ever Frozen Four appearance in 2014, by scoring a natural hat trick in a 3–2 comeback victory over Norwich University.

After graduating SUNY Geneseo, Brickler was invited by the Korea Ice Hockey Association to attend the South Korea Men's National Ice Hockey Team Evaluation Camp in March 2015. Being ineligible to play in the IIHF Ice Hockey World Championships, Brickler then signed as a free agent to professional hockey team High1.

In June 2017, Brickler moved to the UK to sign for the Dundee Stars of the EIHL. He left the team in October 2017.

== Career statistics ==
			Regular season					Playoffs
Season	Team	League	GP	G	A	Pts	PIM	GP	G	A	Pts	PIM
2006–07	Chicago Mission U16	T1EHL U16	31	18	14	32	26	—	—	—	—	—
2007–08	Lincoln Stars	USHL	28	2	0	2	8	—	—	—	—	—
2008–09	Green Mountain Glades	EJHL	21	12	26	38	28	—	—	—	—	—
2009–10	Sioux City Musketeers	USHL	5	0	3	3	0	—	—	—	—	—
2009–10	Westside Warriors	BCHL	32	6	14	20	33	10	1	3	4	4
2010–11	Westside Warriors	BCHL	60	24	26	50	41	13	3	7	10	16
2011–12	UMass-Lowell	NCAA	11	0	0	0	6	—	—	—	—	—
2012–13	SUNY Geneseo	NCAA III	24	9	12	21	14	—	—	—	—	—
2013–14	SUNY Geneseo	NCAA III	29	18	14	32	33	—	—	—	—	—
2014–15	SUNY Geneseo	NCAA III	26	13	20	33	32	—	—	—	—	—
2015–16	High1	AL	40	12	22	34	24	—	—	—	—	—
2016–17	High1	AL	46	9	17	26	22	—	—	—	—	—
2017–18	Dundee Stars	EIHL	6	2	2	4	2	—	—	—	—	—
