= James Willey =

American composer

- Born: October 6, 1939; Lynn, Massachusetts
- Died: February 21, 2026 (aged 86)
- Occupation: Composer

James H. Willey (born October 6, 1939 in Lynn, Massachusetts – February 21, 2026), was a composer. He began composing at an early age and attended the Eastman School of Music, earning a bachelor's degree in 1961, a master's in 1963, and his Ph.D. in Music Theory and Composition in 1972. He studied composition with Bernard Rogers and Howard Hanson.

In 1964, Willey went to the Berkshire Music Center at Tanglewood where he studied with Pulitzer Prize-winning composer Gunther Schuller. Willey began his teaching career at SUNY Geneseo in 1966, received the Chancellor's Award for Excellence in Teaching in 1978, and was awarded the rank of Distinguished Teaching Professor in 1990. He retired from the college in 2000.

Willey has compiled an impressive record of compositions, recordings and publications, and has continued to compose and present premiers of new works since his retirement. Many of his compositions have been premiered or performed in prestigious venues, including Carnegie Hall, Tanglewood Music Center, Steinway Hall, the Smithsonian Opera House and the Seattle Opera House. His works have been programmed by several conductors of international reputation, including David Zinman, former conductor of the Rotterdam, Baltimore and Rochester Philharmonic Orchestras, and Mark Elder, music director of the Halle Orchestra and former director of the English National Opera.

Willey's works have been performed by a wide range of ensembles, including the Buffalo Philharmonic Orchestra, the RPO, the Seattle Symphony, the Baltimore Symphony, the Minnesota Orchestra, the Esterhazy Quartet (String Quartets Nos. 1, 2 & 6; Released by CRI/ NWR) and the Tremont String Quartet. His place in American music has also been recognized by his peers in academia; his works have been performed at institutions and music academies across the country, including the Eastman School of Music, Ithaca College, Boston University, Williams College, Syracuse University, Michigan State University and the University of Miami.

He has won three National Endowment for the Arts Composer Fellowships, held residencies at the Yaddo artists' colony in Saratoga Springs, New York, a fellowship at the Composers' Conference in Johnson, Vermont, and was a semi-finalist for the 1991 Kennedy Center/Friedheim Awards.

Willey died on February 21, 2026 aged 86.
