= Greg O'Connell =

American property developer (1942–2025)

- Born: Gregory Cornelius O'Connell Jr. April 8, 1942; New York City, U.S.
- Died: August 2, 2025 (aged 83); Geneseo, New York, U.S.
- Education: State University of New York at Geneseo
- Occupation: Property developer
- Spouse: Elizabeth DiCasoli (m. 1977)

Gregory Cornelius O'Connell Jr. (April 8, 1942 – August 2, 2025) was an American property developer.

== Early life and career ==
O'Connell was born in Brooklyn, New York, the son of Gregory O'Connell Sr., a police officer, and Marguerite Vascimini. He attended and graduated from Holy Cross High School. After graduating, he attended the State University of New York at Geneseo, earning his bachelor's degree in teaching, which after earning his degree, he joined the New York City Police Department. Over the years working in the police department, he was promoted to the rank of detective.

In 1981, O'Connell retired his position as detective from the police department. After retiring, he worked as a property developer. He gained popularity after redeveloping the neighborhood and local economy of Red Hook, Brooklyn, and in 2011, The New York Times named him "Red Hook's largest landowner".

== Personal life and death ==
In 1977, O'Connell married Elizabeth DiCasoli. Their marriage lasted until O'Connell's death in 2025.

O'Connell died of pancreatic cancer at his home in Geneseo, New York, on August 2, 2025, at the age of 83.
