= State University of New York at Geneseo =

Public university in Geneseo, New York, US

Coordinates: 42.795668°N 77.819547°W

State University of New York College at Geneseo
- Former names: Wadsworth Normal and Training School (1867–1871); Geneseo Normal and Training School (1871–1905); Geneseo Normal School (1905–1942); Geneseo State Teachers College (1942–1948); State University of New York Teachers College at Geneseo (1948–1962)
- Motto: To Learn, To Search, To Serve (SUNY motto)
- Type: Public liberal arts college
- Established: 1867; 159 years ago
- Parent institution: State University of New York
- Academic affiliations: Space-grant
- President: Melinda Treadwell
- Provost: Mary C. Toale
- Students: 4,018 (fall 2025)
- Undergraduates: 3,943 (fall 2025)
- Postgraduates: 75 (fall 2025)
- Location: Geneseo, New York, United States
- Campus: Rural (small town) 220 acres (0.89 km^{2})
- Colors: Blue and Gray
- Nickname: Knights
- Mascot: Victor E. Knight
- Website: geneseo.edu

The State University of New York College at Geneseo (SUNY Geneseo, Geneseo State College or, colloquially, "Geneseo") is a public liberal arts college in Geneseo, New York, United States. It is the state's public honors college and part of the State University of New York (SUNY) system. The college was founded in 1867 as the "Wadsworth Normal and Training School" before it became part of the new State University of New York system as a state liberal arts college in 1948.

== History ==
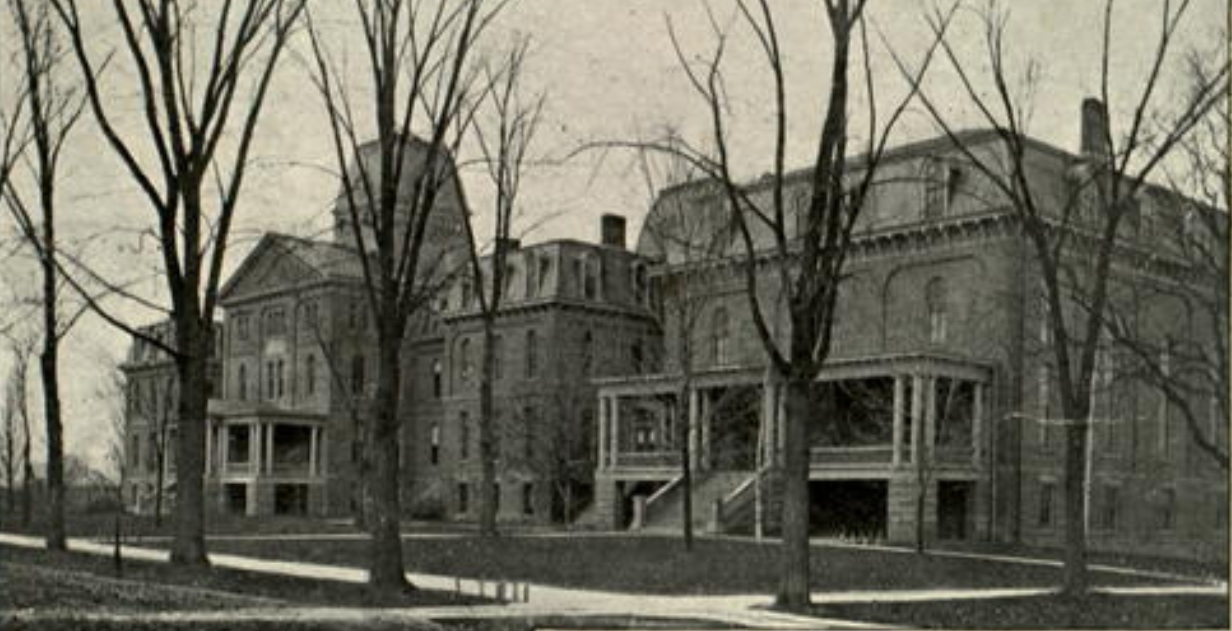
Wadsworth School, c. 1904

The initial predecessor to SUNY Geneseo opened in 1867 as the "Wadsworth Normal and Training School" through an act of the New York State Legislature. However, the legislature later changed the new college's name to the Geneseo Normal and Training School before it officially opened on September 13, 1871.

In 1962, the school adopted its current name, "State University of New York College at Geneseo". Just two years later, in 1964, the school began to offer four-year bachelor's degrees in subjects other than education.

== Academics ==
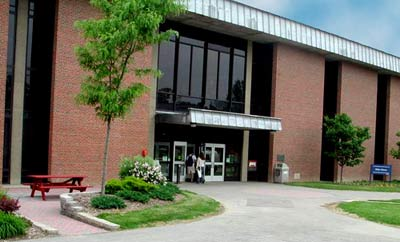
Milne Library.

Geneseo is a public liberal arts college with 61 undergraduate majors, 5 master's programs, and 67 interdisciplinary minors. The most popular majors, in descending order, are education, business, the social sciences, biology, and psychology.

Geneseo is part of the New York Space Grant Consortium, and is provided grants by NASA to support outer-space related research on-campus..

=== Administration ===
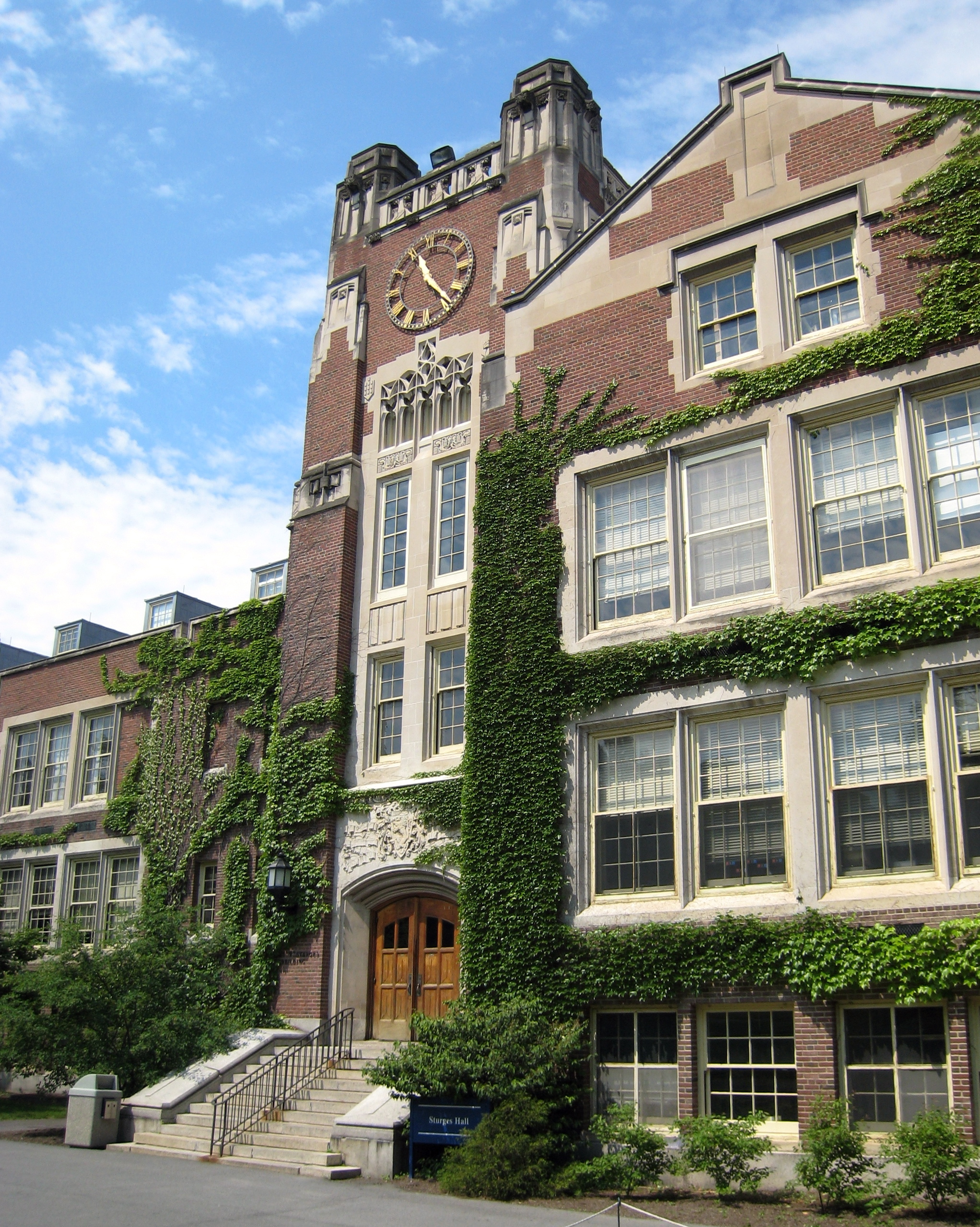
Sturges Hall is Geneseo's landmark building, featuring a clocktower and carillon.

The current college president is Melinda Treadwell, who assumed the role on October 27, 2025.

== Rankings and admissions ==
Academic rankings

Master's
- Washington Monthly: 1

Regional
- U.S. News & World Report: 12

National
- Forbes: 156

=== Admissions ===
Geneseo's acceptance rate is 54% as of 2025.

=== Rankings ===
Forbes ranked SUNY Geneseo 156th out of the top 500 rated private and public colleges and universities in America for the 2024–25 report. Geneseo was also ranked 69th among public colleges and 66th in the northeast.

In 2026, SmartAsset ranked SUNY Geneseo No. 4 on its list of "America's Best Value Small Colleges", which evaluated universities whose cost of attendance was in the lower half of similarly-sized schools.

=== Phi Beta Kappa ===
Geneseo has a chapter of the oldest academic honor society in the United States, Phi Beta Kappa. SUNY's four university centers already had chapters; Geneseo's establishment of a chapter is significant because it was the first (and is currently the only) of New York's thirteen state comprehensive colleges to receive the honor.

The inaugural ΦΒΚ class was inducted to Geneseo's Alpha-Gamma of New York chapter in April 2004.

== Campus ==
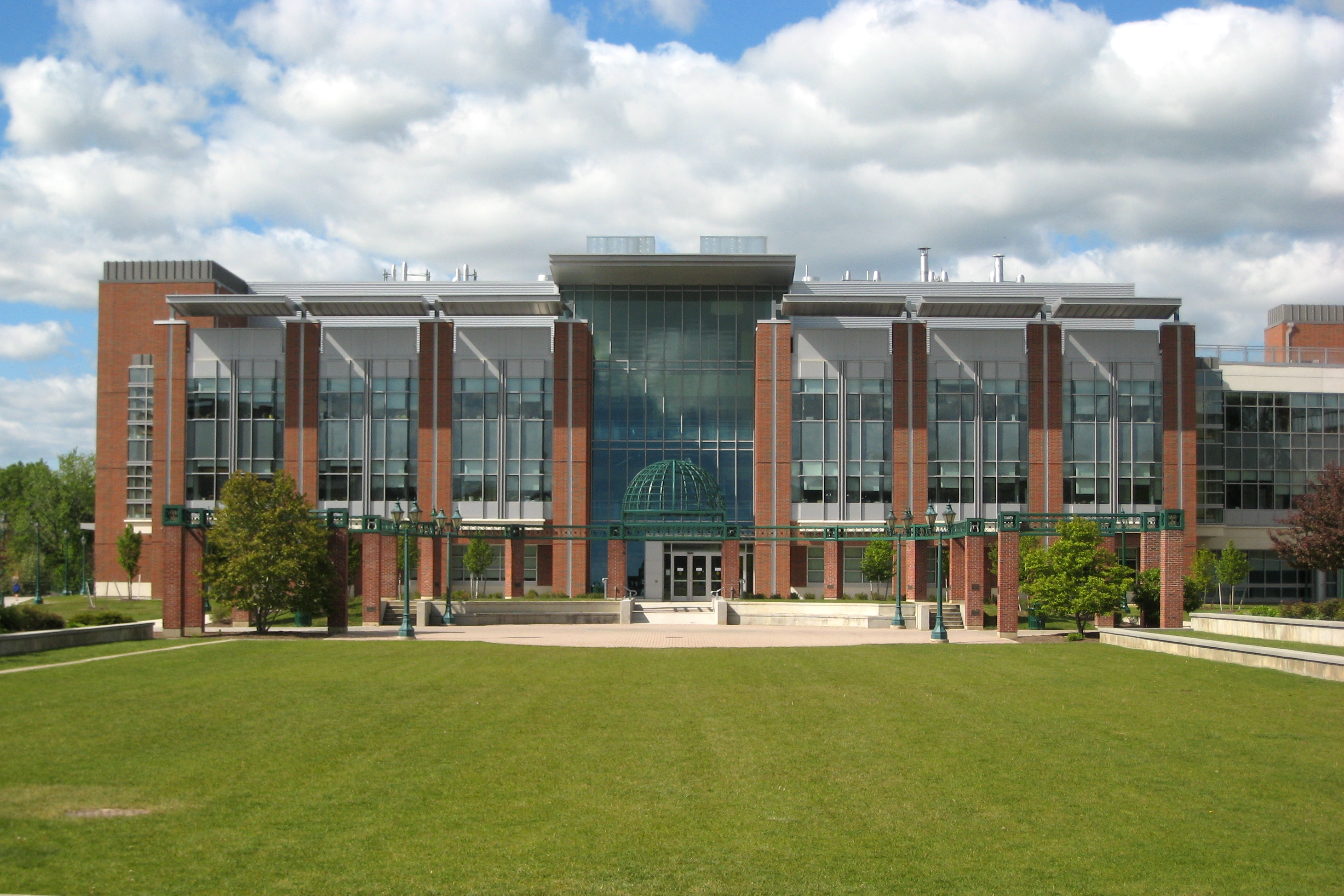
The Integrated Science Center opened in Fall 2006. In the foreground is the college green.

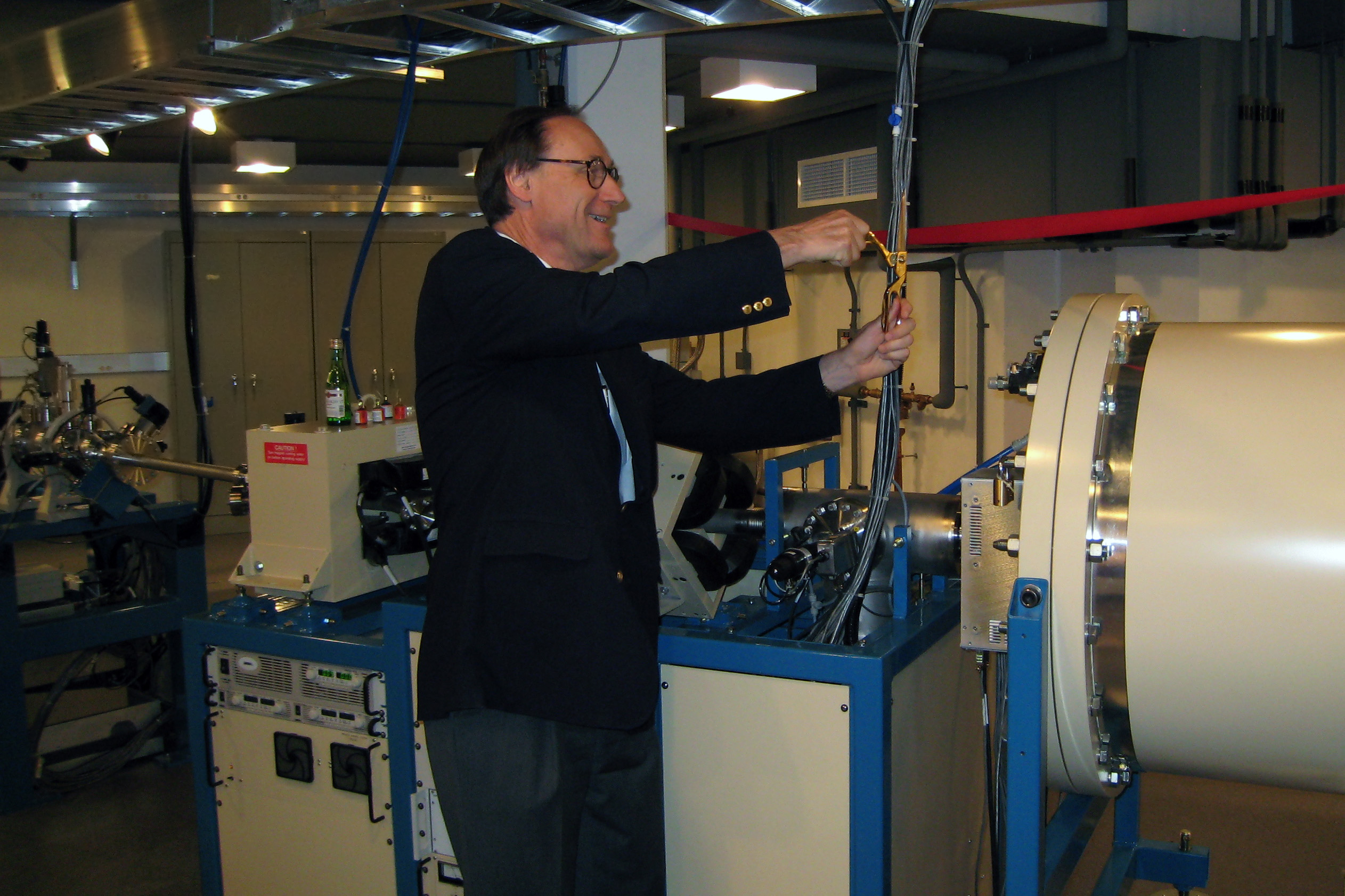
Former President Christopher Dahl cuts the ribbon on Geneseo's 1.7 MeV tandem Pelletron particle accelerator.

The campus is built upon 220 acres of land, with much of the architecture being described as the 'gothic revival' style. There are over 30 buildings on-campus, most of which are residential.

=== Academic and administrative buildings ===
The following are the academic and administrative buildings on-campus. Most buildings are named after notable figures in the college's history.

- Bailey Hall
- Blake Hall (Wings A, B, C)
- Brodie Fine Arts Building
- Doty Hall
- Erwin Administrative Building
- Fraser Hall
- Integrated Science Center
- Newton Hall
- South Hall
- Sturges Hall (closed for renovations, scheduled to reopen in 2027)
- Wadsworth Auditorium
- Welles Hall

=== Significant locations or buildings ===
The following are other significant buildings or locations on campus.

- Clark Service Building
- College Stadium
- eGarden
- Fraser Hall Library
- Lauderdale Health Center
- MacVittie College Union
- Milne Library
- Newton Hall Greenhouse
- Saratoga Heating Plant
- Myrtle A. Merritt Athletic Center
- Schrader Hall

=== Spencer J. Roemer Arboretum ===
At the far end of the South Village Residences, the college maintains the 20-acre (81,000 m^{2}) Spencer J. Roemer Arboretum wherein are preserved "more than 70 species of trees, shrubs and wildflowers, including a magnificent group of oak trees which are more than 200 years old, and several black walnut trees estimated to be over 100 years old."

=== Construction ===
Geneseo has an active set of on-campus construction that aligns with a campus master plan to improve and modernize several areas of campus. As of August 2026, there are two major projects underway, a complete internal renovation of Sturges Hall and new electrical and data distribution systems across campus. Both projects are set to be completed in 2027.

== Student life ==
Undergraduate demographics as of Fall 2023
Race and ethnicity	Total
White	82%
Hispanic	7%
Black	4%
Asian	3%
Unknown	3%
International student	1%
Two or more races	1%
Economic diversity
Low-income (Note: The percentage of students who received an income-based federal Pell grant intended for low-income students.)	26%
Affluent (Note: The percentage of students who are a part of the American middle class at the bare minimum.)	74%

Greek life began at Geneseo in 1871, originally as literary societies. The college hosts several local Greek organizations along with national organizations, as is common in the SUNY schools. As of 2019, about 30% of students were active in either social or professional and service Greek organizations.

There are three dining complexes on campus. These buildings are named after notable figures in indigenous New York's history.

- Letchworth, located in the North Village
- Mary Jemison, located in the Center Village
- Red Jacket, located in the South Village

There are seventeen residence halls on-campus. All buildings, in exception to Jones Hall, are named after counties in New York State. They are divided into the North, Central, and South Villages.

Residence halls on campus
North Village	Central Village	South Village
Allegany Hall Erie Hall Genesee Hall Ontario Hall Putnam Hall Seneca Hall Wyoming Hall	Jones Hall Livingston Hall Monroe Hall Steuben Hall Saratoga Terrace townhouses	Nassau Hall Niagara Hall Onondaga Hall Suffolk Hall Wayne Hall

== Athletics ==
The University athletics team (nicknamed the Knights) are composed of 19 varsity teams (7 men's, 12 women's). All teams compete at the NCAA Division III level and all teams compete in the Empire 8 conference. In men's ice hockey the Geneseo Knights are known as the "Geneseo Ice Knights".

== Notable alumni and faculty ==
=== Alumni ===
==== Entertainment ====
- Daniel Barwick (class of 1990), college president
- Howard Blumenthal, author
- Glenn Gordon Caron (class of 1975), TV producer
- Calvin Culver, actor, writer, producer
- Lana del Rey, singer-songwriter
- Greg Fox (class of 1983), artist/writer
- CGP Grey, web personality.
- Gregg 'Opie' Hughes, radio broadcaster
- Qurrat Ann Kadwani, actress, playwright, film producer
- Joe Langworth (class of 1988), actor, choreographer and director
- Brittany Lauda, voice actress
- Greg O'Connell, property developer
- Marissa Mulder (class of 2007), cabaret artist
- Chelsea Noble (formerly Nancy Mueller; class of 1987), film and TV actress
- William Sadler, actor
- Curt Smith (class of 1973), broadcaster and speech writer
- Jenna Wolfe, anchor of NBC's Weekend Today.
- J.T. The Brick, talk-show host

==== Academia ====
- William T. Amiger (class of 1898), educator, minister

==== Sciences ====
- Brian L. DeMarco (class of 1996), Professor of Physics
- My Hang V. Huynh (class of 1991) energy researcher

==== Government, business, law, activist ====
- Liz Allen (class of 2006), Under Secretary of State for Public Diplomacy and Public Affairs of United States.
- Jeff Clarke (class of 1983), CEO of Kodak
- Adrianna Hungerford (1858–1946), President, Colorado State Woman's Christian Temperance Union
- David Klein, CFO of Constellation Brands.
- Ray Kotcher, non-executive chairman and advisor to Ketchum Inc.
- Joseph D. Morelle, U.S. representative for New York's 25th congressional district since 2018. Former New York State Assembly Majority Leader, 2013–2018
- Jackie Norris (class of 1992), former Chief of Staff to First Lady Michelle Obama.
- Eleanor Roosevelt Seagraves, granddaughter of Franklin Delano Roosevelt, librarian, educator, historian, and editor.
- Raymond Walter (class of 1994), New York State Assemblyman

==== Military ====
- John Loomis Chamberlain, U.S. Army major general

==== Sports ====
- Tyler Brickler, hockey player
- Chris Brown (class of 1994), Buffalo Bills Play-By-Play Announcer

=== Faculty ===
- Ed Folsom, Visiting Professor of English (1975–1976).
- Rita K. Gollin, Professor of English.
- Walter Harding, Professor of English.
- Carol Harter, Geneseo's eleventh president.
- David Maslanka, Professor of music.
- Eoin McKiernan, Professor of Irish Studies.
- Rudy Rucker, Professor of Mathematics.
- Clarence F. Stephens, Professor of mathematics
- Blanche Jennings Thompson, Author
- James Willey, Professor of Music
- Rajendra Ramoon Maharaj, Professor of Theatre and Musical Theatre
