= John R. Tunheim =

American judge (born 1953)

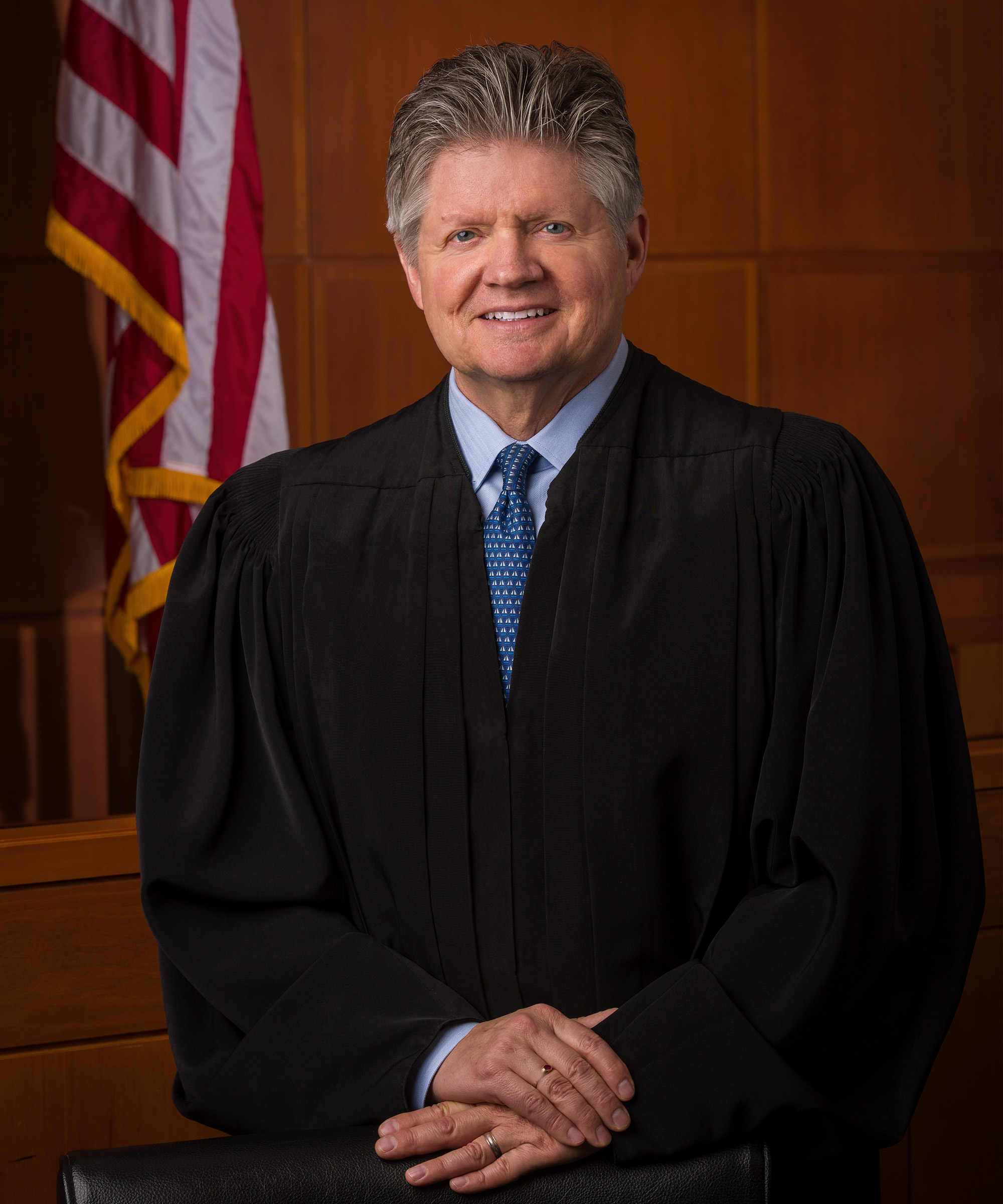
- U.S. District Court Judge John R. Tunheim

Senior Judge of the United States District Court for the District of Minnesota
- Incumbent
- Assumed office December 1, 2023

Chief Judge of the United States District Court for the District of Minnesota
- In office July 1, 2015 – June 30, 2022
- Preceded by: Michael J. Davis
- Succeeded by: Patrick J. Schiltz

Judge of the United States District Court for the District of Minnesota
- In office December 26, 1995 – December 1, 2023
- Appointed by: Bill Clinton
- Preceded by: Donald Alsop
- Succeeded by: Jeffrey Bryan

Personal details
- Born: 1953 (age 72–73) Thief River Falls, Minnesota
- Education: Concordia College (BA); University of Minnesota (JD)

John Raymond Tunheim (born 1953) is an American lawyer who serves as a senior United States district judge of the United States District Court for the District of Minnesota.

== Education and early career ==
Tunheim was born in Thief River Falls, Minnesota, in 1953. He attended Concordia College in Moorhead, Minnesota, and in 1975 received a Bachelor of Arts degree in political science and history. Tunheim interned for then Senator Hubert Humphrey while in college, and worked as a Minnesota field representative after graduating. From 1977 to 1980, Tunheim attended the University of Minnesota Law School, where he served as president of the Minnesota Law Review.

After graduating, Tunheim clerked for Judge Earl R. Larson of the United States District Court for the District of Minnesota. He then worked in private practice for the law firm Oppenheimer, Wolff, Foster, Shepard and Donnelly from 1981 to 1984. He then joined the Office of the State Attorney General of Minnesota, serving as an assistant state attorney general and the manager of the Public Affairs Litigation Division (1984–1985), Minnesota state solicitor general (1985–1986), and chief deputy state attorney general (1986–1995). While with the office he tried three cases before the U.S. Supreme Court: Hodgson v. Minnesota and Perpich v. Department of Defense in 1989, and Growe v. Emison in 1992.

In 1994, Tunheim served as an adjunct professor at the University of Minnesota Law School. He also chaired the Assassination Records Review Board, which oversaw the collection of records relating to the assassination of John F. Kennedy, from 1994 to 1995. Tunheim was interviewed for the 2021 documentary JFK Revisited: Through the Looking Glass. In 2025 he testified at the second hearing of the House Oversight Committee's "Task Force on the Declassification of Federal Secrets".

Tunheim has worked with more than a dozen foreign countries to form and revise their constitutions, laws, and court systems. These efforts include the revision of judicial practices to improve human rights in Uzbekistan, restructuring Kosovo's judiciary and constitution, and training judges in Georgia. In 1984, he wrote and published A Scandinavian Saga, a book exploring patterns of immigration in Minnesota.

== Federal judicial service ==
On July 10, 1995, President Bill Clinton nominated Tunheim to a seat on the United States District Court for the District of Minnesota vacated by Donald Alsop. The Senate confirmed his appointment on December 22, 1995, and Tunheim received his commission on December 26. He served on the federal Committee on Court Administration and Case Management from 2000 to 2005, and chaired the committee from 2005 to 2009. Tunheim served as chief judge from July 1, 2015, to June 30, 2022, and assumed senior status on December 1, 2023.

=== Notable decisions ===
In 2014, Tunheim was involved in the sentencing of several members of the Native Mob, a Minnesota- and Wisconsin-based group of approximately 200, noted by the FBI in 2011 as one of the country's largest and most violent Native American gangs. On October 7, 2014, Tunheim sentenced the leader of the Native Mob, Wakinyon "Killa" Wakan Mcarthur, to 43 years in prison on several charges, including conspiracy to participate in racketeering activity and distribution of a controlled substance. He sentenced two other members of the gang to 24 and a third years and 35 years in prison.

In 2016, Tunheim presided over the child pornography case against Danny Heinrich, the man who kidnapped 12-year-old Jacob Wetterling at gunpoint in St. Peter, Minnesota, before sexually assaulting and murdering him in Paynesville, Minnesota, on October 12, 1989. During sentencing, Tunheim told Heinrich that the crime went beyond the child pornography charges to which he pleaded guilty, saying, "you stole the innocence of children in small towns, in the cities of Minnesota and beyond." Tunheim sentenced Heinrich to 20 years in prison.

In early 2026, Tunheim made several rulings pertaining to the U.S. Immigrations and Customs Enforcement's Operation Metro Surge. On January 28, he ruled against the Department of Homeland Security's Operation Post-Admission Refugee Reverification and Integrity Strengthening (PARRIS), granting a temporary restraining order against DHS under the petitioning of The Advocates for Human Rights, a nonprofit organization. Under Operation PARRIS, the Department of Homeland Security focused on refugees who entered the country legally but were not yet legal residents. Tunheim concluded these targeted refugees had a right to remain in the U.S. both because they entered the country legally and because they have not committed crimes that would make them eligible for detainment. The ruling ordered DHS to stop detaining lawful refugees in Minnesota, and to release those who had been previously detained.

On February 9, Tunheim ruled against DHS's request to dissolve the temporary restraining order. This ruling also ordered updated information regarding the release of detained refugees and granted discovery rights to the plaintiffs.

== Personal life ==
Tunheim lives in Minnesota with his wife, Kathryn Hill Tunheim, who is the CEO of communications firm Tunheim. They met in 1976, when Kathryn was volunteering for Senator Hubert Humphrey's election campaign, and married in 1977. They have two children.

== Awards ==
Tunheim has received awards from the National Association of Attorneys General, including the President's Distinguished Service Award in 1988 and the Marvin Award in 1991. From the University of Minnesota's Hubert H. Humphrey Institute of Public Affairs he received a Mondale Fellowship from 1992 to 1993 and the Outstanding Achievement Award in 2010. He was noted as a Rising Star Lawyer by the Minnesota Journal of Law & Politics in 1993.

Legal offices
Preceded by Donald Alsop	Judge of the United States District Court for the District of Minnesota; 1995–2023	Succeeded by Jeffrey Bryan
Preceded by Michael J. Davis	Chief Judge of the United States District Court for the District of Minnesota; 2015–2022	Succeeded by Patrick J. Schiltz
