= List of United States federal judges by longevity of service =

These are lists of Article III United States federal judges by longevity of service. Senate confirmation along with presidential appointment to an Article III court entails a lifelong appointment, unless the judge is impeached, resigns, retires, or assumes senior status. Such courts include the Supreme Court (since 1789), courts of appeals (since 1891), district courts (since 1789), and the Court of International Trade (since 1980), as well as the defunct circuit courts (1801–1911), Supreme Court of the District of Columbia (1863–1936), Court of Claims (1953–1982), Customs Court (1956–1980), and Court of Customs and Patent Appeals (1958–1982). They include neither Article I courts (e.g., Tax Court, Court of Federal Claims, bankruptcy courts) nor Article IV courts (territorial courts).

The lists measure length of service beginning with the date of presidential appointment, either the date on which the president signed the judge's commission or (as noted) the date of an earlier recess appointment. This date frequently differs from the date on which the judge took their oath of office. Separate lists are maintained for active service, during which a judge will normally maintain a full caseload, as well as for total service, combining active service and senior service. The caseload of a senior judge may range from full to inactive. Data on judges' dates of service is maintained by the Federal Judicial Center.

== Combined Article III court service ==
Lists of the 100 longest-serving judges by active service and total service, combining their service across all levels of Article III courts:

=== Active service ===
Rank	Judge	Court	Appointed by	Began active service	Ended active service	Total active service
1	Henry Potter	C.C. 5th Cir.	Jefferson	May 9, 1801 (Note: Recess appointment.)	April 7, 1802	56 years, 225 days
1	Henry Potter	D.N.C.	Jefferson	April 7, 1802	December 20, 1857	56 years, 225 days
2	William Cranch	C.C.D.C.	J. Adams; Jefferson (Note: As chief judge.)	March 3, 1801	September 1, 1855	54 years, 182 days
3	Manuel Real	C.D. Cal.	L. B. Johnson	November 3, 1966	November 4, 2018	52 years, 1 day
4	Gerald Bard Tjoflat	M.D. Fla.	Nixon	October 16, 1970	December 12, 1975	49 years, 34 days
4	Gerald Bard Tjoflat	5th Cir.	Ford	November 21, 1975	October 1, 1981	49 years, 34 days
4	Gerald Bard Tjoflat	11th Cir.	reassigned	October 1, 1981	November 19, 2019	49 years, 34 days
5	Willard Hall	D. Del.	Monroe	May 6, 1823	December 6, 1871	48 years, 214 days
6	James Sewall Morsell	C.C.D.C.	Madison	January 11, 1815	March 3, 1863	48 years, 51 days
7	Harry Pregerson	C.D. Cal.	L. B. Johnson	December 7, 1967	November 6, 1979	48 years, 4 days
7	Harry Pregerson	9th Cir.	Carter	November 2, 1979	December 11, 2015	48 years, 4 days
8	Joseph Chappell Hutcheson Jr.	S.D. Tex.	Wilson	April 6, 1918	January 30, 1931	46 years, 212 days
8	Joseph Chappell Hutcheson Jr.	5th Cir.	Hoover	January 26, 1931	November 4, 1964	46 years, 212 days
9	Joseph Buffington	W.D. Pa.	B. Harrison	February 23, 1892	September 26, 1906	46 years, 98 days
9	Joseph Buffington	C.C. 3rd Cir.	T. Roosevelt	September 25, 1906	December 31, 1911	46 years, 98 days
9	Joseph Buffington	3rd Cir.	T. Roosevelt	September 25, 1906	June 1, 1938	46 years, 98 days
10	Joel Flaum	N.D. Ill.	Ford	December 20, 1974	June 1, 1983	45 years, 346 days
10	Joel Flaum	7th Cir.	Reagan	May 5, 1983	November 30, 2020	45 years, 346 days
11	Juan R. Torruella	D.P.R.	Ford	December 20, 1974	October 30, 1984	45 years, 311 days
11	Juan R. Torruella	1st Cir.	Reagan	October 4, 1984	October 26, 2020	45 years, 311 days
12	Joseph William Woodrough	D. Neb.	Wilson	April 3, 1916	May 1, 1933	44 years, 275 days
12	Joseph William Woodrough	8th Cir.	F. D. Roosevelt	April 12, 1933	January 3, 1961	44 years, 275 days
13	Ashur Ware	D. Me.	Monroe	February 15, 1822	May 31, 1866	44 years, 105 days
14	Harold P. Burke	W.D.N.Y.	F. D. Roosevelt	June 18, 1937	June 15, 1981	43 years, 362 days
15	John Jay Jackson Jr.	W.D. Va.	Lincoln	August 3, 1861	June 11, 1864	43 years, 224 days
15	John Jay Jackson Jr.	D. W. Va.	reassigned	June 11, 1864	July 1, 1901	43 years, 224 days
15	John Jay Jackson Jr.	N.D. W. Va.	reassigned	July 1, 1901	March 15, 1905	43 years, 224 days
16	Anthony Kennedy	9th Cir.	Ford	March 24, 1975	February 18, 1988	43 years, 129 days
16	Anthony Kennedy	SCOTUS	Reagan	February 11, 1988	July 31, 2018	43 years, 129 days
17	José A. Cabranes	D. Conn.	Carter	December 10, 1979	August 12, 1994	43 years, 89 days
17	José A. Cabranes	2nd Cir.	Clinton	August 10, 1994	March 9, 2023	43 years, 89 days
18	David Norton Edelstein	S.D.N.Y.	Truman	November 1, 1951	November 1, 1994	43 years, 0 days
19	Pauline Newman	Fed. Cir.	Reagan	February 28, 1984	Incumbent	42 years, 267 days
20	Terrence Boyle	E.D.N.C.	Reagan	May 3, 1984	Incumbent	42 years, 203 days
21	Paul Jones	N.D. Ohio	Harding	March 2, 1923	August 4, 1965	42 years, 155 days
22	J. Harvie Wilkinson III	4th Cir.	Reagan	August 13, 1984	Incumbent	42 years, 101 days
23	John Thomas Copenhaver Jr.	S.D. W. Va.	Ford	September 3, 1976	November 1, 2018	42 years, 59 days
24	Learned Hand	S.D.N.Y.	Taft	April 26, 1909	December 29, 1924	42 years, 36 days
24	Learned Hand	2nd Cir.	Coolidge	December 20, 1924	June 1, 1951	42 years, 36 days
25	Ricardo Hinojosa	S.D. Tex.	Reagan	May 5, 1983	May 21, 2025	42 years, 16 days
26	Frank Easterbrook	7th Cir.	Reagan	April 4, 1985	Incumbent	41 years, 232 days
26	Edith Jones	5th Cir.	Reagan	April 4, 1985	Incumbent	41 years, 232 days
28	Stephen Breyer	1st Cir.	Carter	December 10, 1980	August 3, 1994	41 years, 202 days
28	Stephen Breyer	SCOTUS	Clinton	August 3, 1994	June 30, 2022	41 years, 202 days
29	Julia Smith Gibbons	W.D. Tenn.	Reagan	June 7, 1983	August 2, 2002	41 years, 102 days
29	Julia Smith Gibbons	6th Cir.	G. W. Bush	July 31, 2002	September 17, 2024	41 years, 102 days
30	Stephen Victor Wilson	C.D. Cal.	Reagan	October 17, 1985	Incumbent	41 years, 36 days
30	Henry Travillion Wingate	S.D. Miss.	Reagan	October 17, 1985	Incumbent	41 years, 36 days
32	Elijah Paine	D. Vt.	J. Adams	March 3, 1801	April 1, 1842	41 years, 29 days
33	Joseph L. Tauro	D. Mass.	Nixon	October 17, 1972	September 26, 2013	40 years, 344 days
34	Alan Bond Johnson	D. Wyo.	Reagan	December 17, 1985	Incumbent	40 years, 340 days
35	Giles Rich	C.C.P.A.	Eisenhower	August 25, 1958 (Note: Rich joined the C.C.P.A. on July 19, 1956, giving him a total tenure of 42 years, 325 days. However, in 1929, the C.C.P.A. was determined by the Supreme Court to be an Article I court, and it was not designated as an Article III court until August 25, 1958.)	October 1, 1982	40 years, 288 days
35	Giles Rich	Fed. Cir.	reassigned	October 1, 1982	June 9, 1999	40 years, 288 days
36	Carmen Consuelo Cerezo	D.P.R.	Carter	June 30, 1980	February 28, 2021	40 years, 243 days
37	Ogden Hoffman Jr.	N.D. Cal.	Fillmore	February 27, 1851	July 27, 1866	40 years, 163 days
37	Ogden Hoffman Jr.	S.D. Cal.	reassigned	August 31, 1852	January 18, 1854	40 years, 163 days
37	Ogden Hoffman Jr.	D. Cal.	reassigned	July 27, 1866	August 5, 1886	40 years, 163 days
37	Ogden Hoffman Jr.	N.D. Cal.	reassigned	August 5, 1886	August 9, 1891	40 years, 163 days
38	Karen L. Henderson	D.S.C.	Reagan	June 16, 1986	July 11, 1990	40 years, 159 days
38	Karen L. Henderson	D.C. Cir.	G. H. W. Bush	July 5, 1990	Incumbent	40 years, 159 days
39	James William Locke	S.D. Fla.	Grant	February 1, 1872	July 4, 1912	40 years, 154 days
40	John Davis	D. Mass.	J. Adams	February 20, 1801	July 10, 1841	40 years, 140 days
41	Samuel Betts	S.D.N.Y.	J. Q. Adams	December 21, 1826	April 30, 1867	40 years, 130 days
42	Michael Stephen Kanne	N.D. Ind.	Reagan	February 9, 1982	May 21, 1987	40 years, 127 days
42	Michael Stephen Kanne	7th Cir.	Reagan	May 20, 1987	June 16, 2022	40 years, 127 days
43	John Pitman	D.R.I.	Monroe	August 4, 1824	November 17, 1864	40 years, 105 days
44	W. Eugene Davis	W.D. La.	Ford	September 21, 1976	December 9, 1983	40 years, 101 days
44	W. Eugene Davis	5th Cir.	Reagan	November 16, 1983	December 31, 2016	40 years, 101 days
45	Ruth Bader Ginsburg	D.C. Cir.	Carter	June 18, 1980	August 10, 1993	40 years, 92 days
45	Ruth Bader Ginsburg	SCOTUS	Clinton	August 5, 1993	September 18, 2020	40 years, 92 days
46	Ilana Rovner	N.D. Ill.	Reagan	September 12, 1984	August 17, 1992	39 years, 302 days
46	Ilana Rovner	7th Cir.	G. H. W. Bush	August 17, 1992	July 10, 2024	39 years, 302 days
47	John Paul Stevens	7th Cir.	Nixon	October 14, 1970	December 19, 1975	39 years, 259 days
47	John Paul Stevens	SCOTUS	Ford	December 17, 1975	June 30, 2010	39 years, 259 days
48	Harold Loyd Murphy	N.D. Ga.	Carter	July 29, 1977	March 31, 2017	39 years, 245 days
49	Joseph Peter Stadtmueller	E.D. Wis.	Reagan	June 1, 1987	Incumbent	39 years, 174 days
50	William Ball Gilbert	C.C. 9th Cir.	B. Harrison	March 18, 1892	December 31, 1911	39 years, 40 days
50	William Ball Gilbert	9th Cir.	B. Harrison	March 18, 1892	April 27, 1931	39 years, 40 days
51	Henry Clay Caldwell	E.D. Ark.	Lincoln	June 20, 1864	March 13, 1890	38 years, 349 days
51	Henry Clay Caldwell	W.D. Ark.	Lincoln	June 20, 1864	March 3, 1871	38 years, 349 days
51	Henry Clay Caldwell	C.C. 8th Cir.	B. Harrison	March 4, 1890	June 4, 1903	38 years, 349 days
51	Henry Clay Caldwell	8th Cir.	reassigned	June 16, 1891	June 4, 1903	38 years, 349 days
51	James R. Browning	9th Cir.	Kennedy	September 18, 1961	September 1, 2000	38 years, 349 days
53	Jerry Edwin Smith	5th Cir.	Reagan	December 21, 1987	Incumbent	38 years, 336 days
54	J. Robert Elliott	M.D. Ga.	Kennedy	February 17, 1962	December 31, 2000	38 years, 318 days
55	Paul V. Niemeyer	D. Md.	Reagan	February 22, 1988	August 10, 1990	38 years, 273 days
55	Paul V. Niemeyer	4th Cir.	G. H. W. Bush	August 7, 1990	Incumbent	38 years, 273 days
56	Augustus Noble Hand	S.D.N.Y.	Wilson	September 30, 1914	June 1, 1927	38 years, 273 days
56	Augustus Noble Hand	2nd Cir.	Coolidge	May 19, 1927	June 30, 1953	38 years, 273 days
57	Erskine Mayo Ross	S.D. Cal.	Cleveland	January 13, 1887	March 5, 1895	38 years, 138 days
57	Erskine Mayo Ross	C.C. 9th Cir.	Cleveland	February 22, 1895	December 31, 1911	38 years, 138 days
57	Erskine Mayo Ross	9th Cir.	Cleveland	February 22, 1895	May 31, 1925	38 years, 138 days
58	Don Albert Pardee	C.C. 5th Cir.	Garfield	May 13, 1881	December 31, 1911	38 years, 136 days
58	Don Albert Pardee	5th Cir.	reassigned	June 16, 1891	September 26, 1919	38 years, 136 days
59	Martin Leach-Cross Feldman	E.D. La.	Reagan	October 5, 1983	January 26, 2022	38 years, 113 days
60	Hiram Emory Widener Jr.	W.D. Va.	Nixon	July 14, 1969	October 28, 1972	38 years, 3 days
60	Hiram Emory Widener Jr.	4th Cir.	Nixon	October 17, 1972	July 17, 2007	38 years, 3 days
61	Charles Ronald Norgle Sr.	N.D. Ill.	Reagan	October 4, 1984	October 4, 2022	38 years, 0 days
62	Rensselaer Nelson	D. Minn.	Buchanan	May 20, 1858	May 16, 1896	37 years, 362 days
63	Luther Merritt Swygert	N.D. Ind.	F. D. Roosevelt	October 16, 1943	October 11, 1961	37 years, 258 days
63	Luther Merritt Swygert	7th Cir.	Kennedy	September 29, 1961	July 1, 1981	37 years, 258 days
64	Irving Kaufman	S.D.N.Y.	Truman	October 21, 1949	September 29, 1961	37 years, 253 days
64	Irving Kaufman	2nd Cir.	Kennedy	September 22, 1961	July 1, 1987	37 years, 253 days
65	Andrew Phelps McCormick	N.D. Tex.	Hayes	April 10, 1879	March 22, 1892	37 years, 206 days
65	Andrew Phelps McCormick	C.C. 5th Cir.	B. Harrison	March 17, 1892	December 31, 1911	37 years, 206 days
65	Andrew Phelps McCormick	5th Cir.	B. Harrison	March 17, 1892	November 2, 1916	37 years, 206 days
66	Stephen Reinhardt	9th Cir.	Carter	September 11, 1980	March 29, 2018	37 years, 199 days
67	Edward Roscoe Meek	N.D. Tex.	McKinley	July 13, 1898	December 31, 1935	37 years, 171 days
68	Mac Swinford	E.D. Ky. W.D. Ky.	F. D. Roosevelt	August 21, 1937	February 3, 1975	37 years, 166 days
69	Edward Weinfeld	S.D.N.Y.	Truman	August 5, 1950	January 17, 1988	37 years, 165 days
70	Edward Allen Tamm	D.D.C.	Truman	June 22, 1948	March 17, 1965	37 years, 92 days
70	Edward Allen Tamm	D.C. Cir.	L. B. Johnson	March 11, 1965	September 22, 1985	37 years, 92 days
71	Lynn Hughes	S.D. Tex.	Reagan	December 17, 1985	February 12, 2023	37 years, 57 days
72	John C. Knox	S.D.N.Y.	Wilson	April 12, 1918	April 30, 1955	37 years, 18 days
73	Mary Lou Robinson	N.D. Tex.	Carter	April 26, 1979	February 11, 2016	36 years, 291 days
74	Diana E. Murphy	D. Minn.	Carter	February 20, 1980	October 13, 1994	36 years, 283 days
74	Diana E. Murphy	8th Cir.	Clinton	October 11, 1994	November 29, 2016	36 years, 283 days
75	Elizabeth A. Kovachevich	M.D. Fla.	Reagan	March 9, 1982	December 14, 2018	36 years, 280 days
76	Humphrey H. Leavitt	D. Ohio	Jackson	June 30, 1834	February 10, 1855	36 years, 275 days
76	Humphrey H. Leavitt	S.D. Ohio	reassigned	February 10, 1855	April 1, 1871	36 years, 275 days
77	William Elwood Steckler	S.D. Ind.	Truman	April 7, 1950	December 31, 1986	36 years, 268 days
78	Clarence Thomas	D.C. Cir.	G. H. W. Bush	March 6, 1990	October 23, 1991	36 years, 261 days
78	Clarence Thomas	SCOTUS	G. H. W. Bush	October 18, 1991	Incumbent	36 years, 261 days
79	Alan David Lourie	Fed. Cir.	G. H. W. Bush	April 6, 1990	Incumbent	36 years, 230 days
80	Richard Peters	D. Pa.	Washington	January 12, 1792	April 20, 1818	36 years, 223 days
80	Richard Peters	E.D. Pa.	reassigned	April 20, 1818	August 22, 1828	36 years, 223 days
80	J. Skelly Wright	E.D. La.	Truman	October 21, 1949	April 16, 1962	36 years, 223 days
80	J. Skelly Wright	D.C. Cir.	Kennedy	March 30, 1962	June 1, 1986	36 years, 223 days
82	Charles C. Simons	E.D. Mich.	Harding	February 6, 1923	February 2, 1932	36 years, 221 days
82	Charles C. Simons	6th Cir.	Hoover	January 29, 1932	September 15, 1959	36 years, 221 days
83	William O. Douglas	SCOTUS	F. D. Roosevelt	April 15, 1939	November 12, 1975	36 years, 211 days
84	Samuel Alito	3rd Cir.	G. H. W. Bush	April 30, 1990	January 31, 2006	36 years, 206 days
84	Samuel Alito	SCOTUS	G. W. Bush	January 31, 2006	Incumbent	36 years, 206 days
85	John McNairy	D. Tenn.	Washington	February 20, 1797	April 29, 1802	36 years, 193 days
85	John McNairy	E.D. Tenn. W.D. Tenn.	reassigned	April 29, 1802	September 1, 1833	36 years, 193 days
86	David C. Norton	D.S.C.	G. H. W. Bush	July 12, 1990	Incumbent	36 years, 133 days
87	William G. Young	D. Mass.	Reagan	April 4, 1985	July 1, 2021	36 years, 88 days
88	Walter Henry Sanborn	C.C. 8th Cir.	B. Harrison	March 17, 1892	December 31, 1911	36 years, 54 days
88	Walter Henry Sanborn	8th Cir.	B. Harrison	March 17, 1892	May 10, 1928	36 years, 54 days
89	Edwin R. Holmes	N.D. Miss.	Wilson	October 24, 1918	March 1, 1929	36 years, 37 days
89	Edwin R. Holmes	S.D. Miss.	Wilson	October 24, 1918	April 6, 1936	36 years, 37 days
89	Edwin R. Holmes	5th Cir.	F. D. Roosevelt	March 20, 1936	November 30, 1954	36 years, 37 days
90	James B. Loken	8th Cir.	G. H. W. Bush	October 17, 1990	Incumbent	36 years, 36 days
91	Frank Minis Johnson	M.D. Ala.	Eisenhower	October 22, 1955	July 12, 1979	36 years, 8 days
91	Frank Minis Johnson	5th Cir.	Carter	June 21, 1979	October 1, 1981	36 years, 8 days
91	Frank Minis Johnson	11th Cir.	reassigned	October 1, 1981	October 30, 1991	36 years, 8 days
92	Gunnar Nordbye	D. Minn.	Hoover	March 18, 1931	March 6, 1967	35 years, 353 days
93	Charles L. Brieant	S.D.N.Y.	Nixon	July 29, 1971	May 31, 2007	35 years, 306 days
94	Richard Posner	7th Cir.	Reagan	December 1, 1981	September 2, 2017	35 years, 275 days
95	James M. Love	D. Iowa	Pierce	October 5, 1855	July 20, 1882	35 years, 270 days
95	James M. Love	S.D. Iowa	reassigned	July 20, 1882	July 2, 1891	35 years, 270 days
96	Buckner Thruston	C.C.D.C.	Madison	December 14, 1809	August 30, 1845	35 years, 259 days
97	Matthew Harvey	D.N.H.	Jackson	November 2, 1830	April 7, 1866	35 years, 156 days
98	Alexander Boarman	W.D. La.	Garfield	May 18, 1881	August 30, 1916	35 years, 104 days
99	Walter C. Lindley	E.D. Ill.	Harding	September 22, 1922	October 24, 1949	35 years, 103 days
99	Walter C. Lindley	7th Cir.	Truman	October 13, 1949	January 3, 1958	35 years, 103 days
100	Alfred Conkling Coxe Sr.	N.D.N.Y.	Arthur	May 4, 1882	June 14, 1902	35 years, 88 days
100	Alfred Conkling Coxe Sr.	C.C. 2nd Cir.	T. Roosevelt	June 3, 1902	December 31, 1911	35 years, 88 days
100	Alfred Conkling Coxe Sr.	2nd Cir.	T. Roosevelt	June 3, 1902	July 31, 1917	35 years, 88 days

=== Total service ===
Rank	Judge	Court	Appointed by	Began active service	Ended active service	Ended senior status	Total service
1	Joseph William Woodrough	D. Neb.	Wilson	April 3, 1916	May 1, 1933	—	61 years, 182 days
1	Joseph William Woodrough	8th Cir.	F. D. Roosevelt	April 12, 1933	January 3, 1961	October 2, 1977	61 years, 182 days
2	Henry Potter	C.C. 5th Cir.	Jefferson	May 9, 1801	April 7, 1802	—	56 years, 225 days
2	Henry Potter	D.N.C.	Jefferson	April 7, 1802	December 20, 1857	—	56 years, 225 days
3	Gerald Bard Tjoflat	M.D. Fla.	Nixon	October 16, 1970	December 12, 1975	—	56 years, 37 days
3	Gerald Bard Tjoflat	5th Cir.	Ford	November 21, 1975	October 1, 1981	—	56 years, 37 days
3	Gerald Bard Tjoflat	11th Cir.	reassigned	October 1, 1981	November 19, 2019	Incumbent	56 years, 37 days
3	J. Clifford Wallace	S.D. Cal.	Nixon	October 16, 1970	July 14, 1972	—	56 years, 37 days
3	J. Clifford Wallace	9th Cir.	Nixon	June 28, 1972	April 8, 1996	Incumbent	56 years, 37 days
5	William Joseph Nealon Jr.	M.D. Pa.	Kennedy	December 13, 1962	January 1, 1989	August 30, 2018	55 years, 260 days
6	Joseph Buffington	W.D. Pa.	B. Harrison	February 23, 1892	September 26, 1906	—	55 years, 240 days
6	Joseph Buffington	C.C. 3rd Cir.	T. Roosevelt	September 25, 1906	December 31, 1911	—	55 years, 240 days
6	Joseph Buffington	3rd Cir.	T. Roosevelt	September 25, 1906	June 1, 1938	October 21, 1947	55 years, 240 days
7	James Lawrence King	S.D. Fla.	Nixon	October 19, 1970	December 20, 1992	May 2, 2026	55 years, 195 days
8	Levin H. Campbell	D. Mass.	Nixon	November 30, 1971	August 31, 1972	—	54 years, 357 days
8	Levin H. Campbell	1st Cir.	Nixon	June 30, 1972	January 3, 1992	Incumbent	54 years, 357 days
9	Jon O. Newman	D. Conn.	Nixon	December 15, 1971	June 25, 1979	—	54 years, 342 days
9	Jon O. Newman	2nd Cir.	Carter	June 21, 1979	July 1, 1997	Incumbent	54 years, 342 days
10	Joseph Chappell Hutcheson Jr.	S.D. Tex.	Wilson	April 6, 1918	January 30, 1931	—	54 years, 287 days
10	Joseph Chappell Hutcheson Jr.	5th Cir.	Hoover	January 26, 1931	November 4, 1964	January 18, 1973	54 years, 287 days
11	Seybourn Harris Lynne	N.D. Ala.	Truman	January 3, 1946	January 9, 1973	September 10, 2000	54 years, 251 days
12	Edward J. McManus	N.D. Iowa	Kennedy	July 16, 1962	February 9, 1985	March 20, 2017	54 years, 247 days
13	William Cranch	C.C.D.C.	J. Adams; Jefferson	March 3, 1801	September 1, 1855	—	54 years, 182 days
14	Jack B. Weinstein	E.D.N.Y.	L. B. Johnson	April 15, 1967	March 1, 1993	June 15, 2021	54 years, 61 days
15	Walter King Stapleton	D. Del.	Nixon	October 14, 1970	May 8, 1985	—	54 years, 40 days
15	Walter King Stapleton	3rd Cir.	Reagan	April 4, 1985	June 2, 1999	November 23, 2024	54 years, 40 days
16	William J. Bauer	N.D. Ill.	Nixon	November 10, 1971	January 3, 1975	—	54 years, 35 days
16	William J. Bauer	7th Cir.	Ford	December 20, 1974	October 31, 1994	December 15, 2025	54 years, 35 days
17	George C. Young	N.D. Fla. S.D. Fla.	Kennedy	September 18, 1961	September 17, 1966	—	53 years, 218 days
17	George C. Young	M.D. Fla.	reassigned	October 29, 1962	October 19, 1981	April 24, 2015	53 years, 218 days
18	Alfred Goodwin	D. Ore.	Nixon	December 11, 1969	December 17, 1971	—	53 years, 16 days
18	Alfred Goodwin	9th Cir.	Nixon	November 30, 1971	January 31, 1991	December 27, 2022	53 years, 16 days
19	Wilfred Feinberg	S.D.N.Y.	Kennedy	October 5, 1961	March 17, 1966	—	52 years, 299 days
19	Wilfred Feinberg	2nd Cir.	L. B. Johnson	March 7, 1966	January 31, 1991	July 31, 2014	52 years, 299 days
20	Manuel Real	C.D. Cal.	L. B. Johnson	November 3, 1966	November 4, 2018	June 26, 2019	52 years, 235 days
21	Albert Branson Maris	E.D. Pa.	F. D. Roosevelt	June 22, 1936	June 27, 1938	—	52 years, 230 days
21	Albert Branson Maris	3rd Cir.	F. D. Roosevelt	June 24, 1938	December 31, 1958	February 7, 1989	52 years, 230 days
22	Learned Hand	S.D.N.Y.	Taft	April 26, 1909	December 29, 1924	—	52 years, 114 days
22	Learned Hand	2nd Cir.	Coolidge	December 20, 1924	June 1, 1951	August 18, 1961	52 years, 114 days
23	Donald Alsop	D. Minn.	Ford	December 20, 1974	August 28, 1992	Incumbent	51 years, 337 days
24	Orie Leon Phillips	D.N.M.	Harding	March 3, 1923	April 29, 1929	—	51 years, 256 days
24	Orie Leon Phillips	10th Cir.	Hoover	April 29, 1929	January 1, 1956	November 14, 1974	51 years, 256 days
25	Anthony Kennedy	9th Cir.	Ford	March 24, 1975	February 18, 1988	—	51 years, 243 days
25	Anthony Kennedy	SCOTUS	Reagan	February 11, 1988	July 31, 2018	Incumbent	51 years, 243 days
26	John P. Fullam	E.D. Pa.	L. B. Johnson	August 11, 1966	April 1, 1990	March 8, 2018	51 years, 209 days
27	Damon Keith	E.D. Mich.	L. B. Johnson	October 12, 1967	November 22, 1977	—	51 years, 198 days
27	Damon Keith	6th Cir.	Carter	October 21, 1977	May 1, 1995	April 28, 2019	51 years, 198 days
28	Alexander Harvey II	D. Md.	L. B. Johnson	September 22, 1966	March 8, 1991	December 4, 2017	51 years, 73 days
29	Eugene E. Siler Jr.	E.D. Ky. W.D. Ky.	Ford	November 13, 1975	September 20, 1991	—	51 years, 9 days
29	Eugene E. Siler Jr.	6th Cir.	G. H. W. Bush	September 16, 1991	December 31, 2001	Incumbent	51 years, 9 days
30	Patrick Higginbotham	N.D. Tex.	Ford	December 12, 1975	August 3, 1982	—	50 years, 345 days
30	Patrick Higginbotham	5th Cir.	Reagan	July 30, 1982	August 28, 2006	Incumbent	50 years, 345 days
31	William Augustus Bootle	M.D. Ga.	Eisenhower	May 20, 1954	March 11, 1972	January 25, 2005	50 years, 250 days
32	Charles S. Haight Jr.	S.D.N.Y.	Ford	March 29, 1976	September 23, 1995	Incumbent	50 years, 238 days
33	James R. Browning	9th Cir.	Kennedy	September 18, 1961	September 1, 2000	May 6, 2012	50 years, 231 days
34	Myron Donovan Crocker	S.D. Cal.	Eisenhower	September 21, 1959	September 18, 1966	—	50 years, 134 days
34	Myron Donovan Crocker	E.D. Cal.	reassigned	September 18, 1966	January 1, 1981	February 2, 2010	50 years, 134 days
35	Harry W. Wellford	W.D. Tenn.	Nixon	December 12, 1970	September 10, 1982	—	50 years, 126 days
35	Harry W. Wellford	6th Cir.	Reagan	August 20, 1982	January 15, 1991	April 17, 2021	50 years, 126 days
36	Peter T. Fay	S.D. Fla.	Nixon	October 16, 1970	October 8, 1976	—	50 years, 107 days
36	Peter T. Fay	5th Cir.	Ford	September 21, 1976	October 1, 1981	—	50 years, 107 days
36	Peter T. Fay	11th Cir.	reassigned	October 1, 1981	January 19, 1994	January 31, 2021	50 years, 107 days
37	Charles Miller Metzner	S.D.N.Y.	Eisenhower	September 10, 1959	September 30, 1977	November 30, 2009	50 years, 81 days
38	Walter T. McGovern	W.D. Wash.	Nixon	April 23, 1971	September 30, 1987	July 8, 2021	50 years, 76 days
39	Carl Olaf Bue Jr.	S.D. Tex.	Nixon	October 15, 1970	September 2, 1987	December 24, 2020	50 years, 70 days
40	W. Eugene Davis	W.D. La.	Ford	September 21, 1976	December 9, 1983	—	50 years, 62 days
40	W. Eugene Davis	5th Cir.	Reagan	November 16, 1983	December 31, 2016	Incumbent	50 years, 62 days
41	William Henry Stafford Jr.	N.D. Fla.	Ford	May 14, 1975	May 31, 1996	July 14, 2025	50 years, 61 days
42	William Terrell Hodges	M.D. Fla.	Nixon	December 15, 1971	May 2, 1999	January 4, 2022	50 years, 20 days
43	Harry Pregerson	C.D. Cal.	L. B. Johnson	December 7, 1967	November 6, 1979	—	49 years, 353 days
43	Harry Pregerson	9th Cir.	Carter	November 2, 1979	December 11, 2015	November 25, 2017	49 years, 353 days
44	Joel Flaum	N.D. Ill.	Ford	December 20, 1974	June 1, 1983	—	49 years, 350 days
44	Joel Flaum	7th Cir.	Reagan	May 5, 1983	November 30, 2020	December 4, 2024	49 years, 350 days
45	Ralph B. Guy Jr.	E.D. Mich.	Ford	May 12, 1976	October 17, 1985	—	49 years, 343 days
45	Ralph B. Guy Jr.	6th Cir.	Reagan	October 17, 1985	September 1, 1994	April 20, 2026	49 years, 343 days
46	Wesley E. Brown	D. Kan.	Kennedy	April 4, 1962	September 1, 1979	January 23, 2012	49 years, 294 days
47	John Thomas Copenhaver Jr.	S.D. W. Va.	Ford	September 3, 1976	November 1, 2018	May 12, 2026	49 years, 251 days
48	Edward Louis Filippine	E.D. Mo.	Carter	July 22, 1977	June 11, 1995	Incumbent	49 years, 123 days
49	John Thomas Curtin	W.D.N.Y.	L. B. Johnson	December 14, 1967	July 1, 1989	April 14, 2017	49 years, 121 days
50	Daniel Holcombe Thomas	S.D. Ala.	Truman	March 9, 1951	August 25, 1971	April 13, 2000	49 years, 35 days
51	Pierre N. Leval	S.D.N.Y.	Carter	October 31, 1977	November 8, 1993	—	49 years, 22 days
51	Pierre N. Leval	2nd Cir.	Clinton	October 20, 1993	August 16, 2002	Incumbent	49 years, 22 days
52	John L. Kane Jr.	D. Colo.	Carter	December 16, 1977	April 8, 1988	Incumbent	48 years, 341 days
53	David Norton Edelstein	S.D.N.Y.	Truman	November 1, 1951	November 1, 1994	August 19, 2000	48 years, 292 days
54	John Paul Stevens	7th Cir.	Nixon	October 14, 1970	December 19, 1975	—	48 years, 275 days
54	John Paul Stevens	SCOTUS	Ford	December 17, 1975	June 30, 2010	July 16, 2019	48 years, 275 days
55	Donald West VanArtsdalen	E.D. Pa.	Nixon	October 15, 1970	October 21, 1985	May 21, 2019	48 years, 218 days
56	Willard Hall	D. Del.	Monroe	May 6, 1823	December 6, 1871	—	48 years, 214 days
57	Thomas Walter Swan	2nd Cir.	Coolidge	December 22, 1926	July 1, 1953	July 13, 1975	48 years, 203 days
58	Myron H. Bright	8th Cir.	L. B. Johnson	June 7, 1968	June 1, 1985	December 12, 2016	48 years, 188 days
59	John William Ditter Jr.	E.D. Pa.	Nixon	October 15, 1970	October 19, 1986	April 7, 2019	48 years, 174 days
60	Bailey Aldrich	D. Mass.	Eisenhower	April 27, 1954	September 15, 1959	—	48 years, 151 days
60	Bailey Aldrich	1st Cir.	Eisenhower	September 10, 1959	August 31, 1972	September 25, 2002	48 years, 151 days
61	Edwin F. Hunter	W.D. La.	Eisenhower	October 3, 1953	February 19, 1976	February 22, 2002	48 years, 142 days
62	Frederick Jacob Reagan Heebe	E.D. La.	L. B. Johnson	March 26, 1966	August 26, 1992	August 10, 2014	48 years, 137 days
63	John C. Knox	S.D.N.Y.	Wilson	April 12, 1918	April 30, 1955	August 23, 1966	48 years, 133 days
64	Jose Alejandro Gonzalez Jr.	S.D. Fla.	Carter	July 28, 1978	November 30, 1996	Incumbent	48 years, 117 days
65	James Sewall Morsell	C.C.D.C.	Madison	January 11, 1815	March 3, 1863	—	48 years, 51 days
66	Albert Vickers Bryan Jr.	E.D. Va.	Nixon	July 29, 1971	December 1, 1991	August 27, 2019	48 years, 29 days
67	William Joseph Campbell	N.D. Ill.	F. D. Roosevelt	October 10, 1940	March 19, 1970	October 19, 1988	48 years, 9 days
68	Samuel Conti	N.D. Cal.	Nixon	October 16, 1970	November 1, 1987	August 29, 2018	47 years, 317 days
69	Albert L. Reeves	W.D. Mo.	Harding	June 24, 1923	February 2, 1954	March 24, 1971	47 years, 273 days
70	William Benner Enright	S.D. Cal.	Nixon	June 30, 1972	July 12, 1990	March 7, 2020	47 years, 251 days
71	Amalya Kearse	2nd Cir.	Carter	June 21, 1979	June 11, 2002	Incumbent	47 years, 154 days
72	R. Lanier Anderson III	5th Cir.	Carter	July 13, 1979	October 1, 1981	—	47 years, 132 days
72	R. Lanier Anderson III	11th Cir.	reassigned	October 1, 1981	January 31, 2009	Incumbent	47 years, 132 days
72	Carolyn Dineen King	5th Cir.	Carter	July 13, 1979	December 31, 2013	Incumbent	47 years, 132 days
74	Marvin Aspen	N.D. Ill.	Carter	July 24, 1979	July 1, 2002	Incumbent	47 years, 121 days
74	Susan H. Black	M.D. Fla.	Carter	July 24, 1979	September 3, 1992	—	47 years, 121 days
74	Susan H. Black	11th Cir.	G. H. W. Bush	August 12, 1992	February 25, 2011	Incumbent	47 years, 121 days
74	Orinda Dale Evans	N.D. Ga.	Carter	July 24, 1979	December 31, 2008	Incumbent	47 years, 121 days
77	Garnett Thomas Eisele	E.D. Ark.	Nixon	August 6, 1970	August 1, 1991	November 26, 2017	47 years, 112 days
78	Marion Speed Boyd	W.D. Tenn.	F. D. Roosevelt	September 27, 1940	August 1, 1966	January 9, 1988	47 years, 104 days
79	Rya W. Zobel	D. Mass.	Carter	March 23, 1979	April 1, 2014	July 4, 2026	47 years, 103 days
80	James Hughes Hancock	N.D. Ala.	Nixon	April 17, 1973	May 1, 1996	July 24, 2020	47 years, 98 days
81	Warren Keith Urbom	D. Neb.	Nixon	April 24, 1970	December 31, 1990	July 28, 2017	47 years, 95 days
82	Howard F. Sachs	W.D. Mo.	Carter	September 26, 1979	October 31, 1992	Incumbent	47 years, 57 days
82	Mary M. Schroeder	9th Cir.	Carter	September 26, 1979	December 31, 2011	Incumbent	47 years, 57 days
84	James von der Heydt	D. Alaska	L. B. Johnson	November 3, 1966	July 15, 1984	December 1, 2013	47 years, 28 days
85	Barbara Brandriff Crabb	W.D. Wis.	Carter	November 2, 1979	March 24, 2010	Incumbent	47 years, 20 days
85	Stephanie Kulp Seymour	10th Cir.	Carter	November 2, 1979	October 16, 2005	Incumbent	47 years, 20 days
85	Anne Elise Thompson	D.N.J.	Carter	November 2, 1979	June 1, 2001	Incumbent	47 years, 20 days
88	Frank Howell Seay	E.D. Okla.	Carter	November 2, 1979	September 25, 2003	November 1, 2026	46 years, 364 days
89	William Bertelsman	E.D. Ky.	Carter	November 27, 1979	February 1, 2001	Incumbent	46 years, 360 days
89	Dudley Hollingsworth Bowen Jr.	S.D. Ga.	Carter	November 27, 1979	June 25, 2006	Incumbent	46 years, 360 days
91	José A. Cabranes	D. Conn.	Carter	December 10, 1979	August 12, 1994	—	46 years, 347 days
91	José A. Cabranes	2nd Cir.	Clinton	August 10, 1994	March 9, 2023	Incumbent	46 years, 347 days
92	Terry J. Hatter Jr.	C.D. Cal.	Carter	December 20, 1979	April 22, 2005	Incumbent	46 years, 337 days
92	Dorothy Wright Nelson	9th Cir.	Carter	December 20, 1979	January 1, 1995	Incumbent	46 years, 337 days
94	Robert F. Chapman	D.S.C.	Nixon	May 27, 1971	October 2, 1981	—	46 years, 326 days
94	Robert F. Chapman	4th Cir.	Reagan	September 19, 1981	May 31, 1991	April 18, 2018	46 years, 326 days
95	Leonard I. Garth	D.N.J.	Nixon	December 18, 1969	August 29, 1973	—	46 years, 279 days
95	Leonard I. Garth	3rd Cir.	Nixon	August 6, 1973	June 30, 1986	September 22, 2016	46 years, 279 days
96	Harry T. Edwards	D.C. Cir.	Carter	February 20, 1980	November 3, 2005	Incumbent	46 years, 275 days
96	Barbara Jacobs Rothstein	W.D. Wash.	Carter	February 20, 1980	September 1, 2011	Incumbent	46 years, 275 days
98	William Clark O'Kelley	N.D. Ga.	Nixon	October 16, 1970	October 1, 1996	July 5, 2017	46 years, 262 days
99	George M. Bourquin	D. Mont.	Taft	March 8, 1912	March 9, 1934	November 15, 1958	46 years, 252 days
100	Gunnar Nordbye	D. Minn.	Hoover	March 18, 1931	March 6, 1967	November 5, 1977	46 years, 232 days

== Supreme Court ==
Lists of the 25 longest-serving justices of the Supreme Court by active service and total service follow. Their tenures generally differ from those found at list of United States Supreme Court justices by time in office by several days, as that page uses a justice's oath of office, rather than their date of commission, as their start date. Justices of the Supreme Court who have assumed senior status cannot hear Supreme Court cases, but may hear cases on lower courts.

=== Active service ===
Rank	Justice	Appointed by	Began active service	Ended active service	Active service
1	William O. Douglas	F. D. Roosevelt	April 15, 1939	November 12, 1975	36 years, 211 days
2	Clarence Thomas	G. H. W. Bush	October 18, 1991	Incumbent	35 years, 35 days
3	Stephen Johnson Field	Lincoln	March 10, 1863	December 1, 1897	34 years, 266 days
4	John Paul Stevens	Ford	December 17, 1975	June 30, 2010	34 years, 195 days
5	John Marshall	J. Adams (Note: As Chief Justice of the United States.)	January 31, 1801	July 6, 1835	34 years, 156 days
6	Hugo Black	F. D. Roosevelt	August 18, 1937	September 17, 1971	34 years, 30 days
7	John Marshall Harlan	Hayes	November 29, 1877	October 14, 1911	33 years, 319 days
8	Joseph Story	Madison	November 18, 1811	September 10, 1845	33 years, 296 days
9	William J. Brennan Jr.	Eisenhower	October 15, 1956	July 20, 1990	33 years, 278 days
10	William Rehnquist	Nixon; Reagan	December 15, 1971	September 3, 2005	33 years, 262 days
11	James M. Wayne	Jackson	January 9, 1835	July 5, 1867	32 years, 177 days
12	John McLean	Jackson	March 7, 1829	April 4, 1861	32 years, 28 days
13	Byron White	Kennedy	April 12, 1962	June 28, 1993	31 years, 77 days
14	Bushrod Washington	J. Adams	September 29, 1798	November 26, 1829	31 years, 58 days
15	Anthony Kennedy	Reagan	February 11, 1988	July 31, 2018	30 years, 170 days
16	William Johnson	Jefferson	March 26, 1804	August 4, 1834	30 years, 131 days
17	Antonin Scalia	Reagan	September 25, 1986	February 13, 2016	29 years, 141 days
18	Oliver Wendell Holmes Jr.	T. Roosevelt	December 4, 1902	January 12, 1932	29 years, 39 days
19	Roger B. Taney	Jackson	March 15, 1836	October 12, 1864	28 years, 211 days
20	Samuel Freeman Miller	Lincoln	July 16, 1862	October 13, 1890	28 years, 89 days
21	John Catron	Van Buren	March 8, 1837	May 30, 1865	28 years, 83 days
22	Stephen Breyer	Clinton	August 3, 1994	June 30, 2022	27 years, 331 days
23	Samuel Nelson	Tyler	February 13, 1845	November 28, 1872	27 years, 289 days
24	Edward Douglass White	Cleveland; Taft	February 19, 1894	May 19, 1921	27 years, 89 days
25	Ruth Bader Ginsburg	Clinton	August 5, 1993	September 18, 2020	27 years, 44 days

=== Total service ===
Rank	Justice	Appointed by	Began active service	Ended active service	Ended retired status	Total service
1	John Paul Stevens	Ford	December 17, 1975	June 30, 2010	July 16, 2019	43 years, 211 days
2	Sandra Day O'Connor	Reagan	September 22, 1981	January 31, 2006	December 1, 2023	42 years, 70 days
3	Stanley Forman Reed	F. D. Roosevelt	January 27, 1938	February 25, 1957	April 2, 1980	42 years, 66 days
4	William J. Brennan Jr.	Eisenhower	October 15, 1956	July 20, 1990	July 24, 1997	40 years, 282 days
5	William O. Douglas	F. D. Roosevelt	April 15, 1939	November 12, 1975	January 19, 1980	40 years, 279 days
6	Byron White	Kennedy	April 12, 1962	June 28, 1993	April 15, 2002	40 years, 3 days
7	Anthony Kennedy	Reagan	February 11, 1988	July 31, 2018	Incumbent	38 years, 284 days
8	Clarence Thomas	G. H. W. Bush	October 18, 1991	Incumbent	—	35 years, 35 days
9	Stephen Johnson Field	Lincoln	March 10, 1863	December 1, 1897	—	34 years, 266 days
10	David Souter	G. H. W. Bush	October 3, 1990	June 30, 2009	May 8, 2025	34 years, 217 days
11	John Marshall	J. Adams	January 31, 1801	July 6, 1835	—	34 years, 156 days
12	Hugo Black	F. D. Roosevelt	August 18, 1937	September 17, 1971	September 25, 1971	34 years, 38 days
13	John Marshall Harlan	Hayes	November 29, 1877	October 14, 1911	—	33 years, 319 days
14	Joseph Story	Madison	November 18, 1811	September 10, 1845	—	33 years, 296 days
15	William Rehnquist	Nixon; Reagan	December 15, 1971	September 3, 2005	—	33 years, 262 days
16	James M. Wayne	Jackson	January 9, 1835	July 5, 1867	—	32 years, 177 days
17	Stephen Breyer	Clinton	August 3, 1994	June 30, 2022	Incumbent	32 years, 111 days
18	John McLean	Jackson	March 7, 1829	April 4, 1861	—	32 years, 28 days
19	James Clark McReynolds	Wilson	August 29, 1914	January 31, 1941	August 24, 1946	31 years, 360 days
20	Bushrod Washington	J. Adams	September 29, 1798	November 26, 1829	—	31 years, 58 days
21	William Johnson	Jefferson	March 26, 1804	August 4, 1834	—	30 years, 131 days
22	Willis Van Devanter	Taft	December 16, 1910	June 2, 1937	February 8, 1941	30 years, 54 days
23	Antonin Scalia	Reagan	September 25, 1986	February 13, 2016	—	29 years, 141 days
24	Oliver Wendell Holmes Jr.	T. Roosevelt	December 4, 1902	January 12, 1932	—	29 years, 39 days
25	Harry Blackmun	Nixon	May 14, 1970	August 3, 1994	March 4, 1999	28 years, 294 days

== Courts of appeals ==
Lists of the 50 longest-serving judges of the courts of appeals by active service and total service follow. These lists do not include service on the circuit courts that preceded the courts of appeals as intermediate-level federal courts. (Note: Circuit judges whose active service exceeded the minimum on the active service table include Judges Cranch, Morsell, and Thruston of the United States Circuit Court of the District of Columbia and Pardee of the Fifth Circuit, as shown on the "Combined Article III court service" table above, and Judge Emile Henry Lacombe of the Second Circuit, who served 28 years, 265 days from his recess appointment to the circuit court on May 26, 1887 to his resignation from the court of appeals on February 15, 1916.)

=== Active service ===
Rank	Judge	Court	Appointed by	Began active service	Ended active service	Total active service
1	Gerald Bard Tjoflat	5th Cir.	Ford	November 21, 1975	October 1, 1981	43 years, 363 days
1	Gerald Bard Tjoflat	11th Cir.	reassigned	October 1, 1981	November 19, 2019	43 years, 363 days
2	Pauline Newman	Fed. Cir.	Reagan	February 28, 1984	Incumbent	42 years, 267 days
3	J. Harvie Wilkinson III	4th Cir.	Reagan	August 13, 1984	Incumbent	42 years, 101 days
4	Frank Easterbrook	7th Cir.	Reagan	April 4, 1985	Incumbent	41 years, 232 days
4	Edith Jones	5th Cir.	Reagan	April 4, 1985	Incumbent	41 years, 232 days
6	William Ball Gilbert	9th Cir.	B. Harrison	March 18, 1892	April 27, 1931	39 years, 40 days
7	James R. Browning	9th Cir.	Kennedy	September 18, 1961	September 1, 2000	38 years, 349 days
8	Jerry Edwin Smith	5th Cir.	Reagan	December 21, 1987	Incumbent	38 years, 336 days
9	Joel Flaum	7th Cir.	Reagan	May 5, 1983	November 30, 2020	37 years, 209 days
10	Stephen Reinhardt	9th Cir.	Carter	September 11, 1980	March 29, 2018	37 years, 199 days
11	Alan David Lourie	Fed. Cir.	G. H. W. Bush	April 6, 1990	Incumbent	36 years, 230 days
12	Karen L. Henderson	D.C. Cir.	G. H. W. Bush	July 5, 1990	Incumbent	36 years, 140 days
13	Paul V. Niemeyer	4th Cir.	G. H. W. Bush	August 7, 1990	Incumbent	36 years, 107 days
14	Walter Henry Sanborn	8th Cir.	B. Harrison	March 17, 1892	May 10, 1928	36 years, 54 days
15	Harry Pregerson	9th Cir.	Carter	November 2, 1979	December 11, 2015	36 years, 39 days
16	James B. Loken	8th Cir.	G. H. W. Bush	October 17, 1990	Incumbent	36 years, 36 days
17	Juan R. Torruella	1st Cir.	Reagan	October 4, 1984	October 26, 2020	36 years, 22 days
18	Richard Posner	7th Cir.	Reagan	December 1, 1981	September 2, 2017	35 years, 275 days
19	E. Grady Jolly	5th Cir.	Reagan	July 30, 1982	October 3, 2017	35 years, 65 days
20	Michael Stephen Kanne	7th Cir.	Reagan	May 20, 1987	June 16, 2022	35 years, 27 days
21	Hiram Emory Widener Jr.	4th Cir.	Nixon	October 17, 1972	July 17, 2007	34 years, 273 days
22	Carolyn Dineen King	5th Cir.	Carter	July 13, 1979	December 31, 2013	34 years, 171 days
23	Dolores Sloviter	3rd Cir.	Carter	June 21, 1979	June 21, 2013	34 years, 0 days
24	Boyce F. Martin Jr.	6th Cir.	Carter	September 26, 1979	August 16, 2013	33 years, 324 days
25	Joseph Chappell Hutcheson Jr.	5th Cir.	Hoover	January 26, 1931	November 4, 1964	33 years, 283 days
26	Roger Leland Wollman	8th Cir.	Reagan	July 22, 1985	December 14, 2018	33 years, 145 days
27	W. Eugene Davis	5th Cir.	Reagan	November 16, 1983	December 31, 2016	33 years, 45 days
28	Walter J. Cummings Jr.	7th Cir.	L. B. Johnson	August 11, 1966	April 24, 1999	32 years, 256 days
29	Carl E. Stewart	5th Cir.	Clinton	May 9, 1994	Incumbent	32 years, 197 days
30	John J. Parker	4th Cir.	Coolidge	October 3, 1925	March 17, 1958	32 years, 165 days
31	Mary M. Schroeder	9th Cir.	Carter	September 26, 1979	December 31, 2011	32 years, 96 days
32	Evan Alfred Evans	7th Cir.	Wilson	May 10, 1916	July 7, 1948	32 years, 58 days
33	Alex Kozinski	9th Cir.	Reagan	November 7, 1985	December 18, 2017	32 years, 41 days
34	Ilana Rovner	7th Cir.	G. H. W. Bush	August 17, 1992	July 10, 2024	31 years, 328 days
35	Joseph Buffington	3rd Cir.	T. Roosevelt	September 25, 1906	June 1, 1938	31 years, 249 days
36	Karen Nelson Moore	6th Cir.	Clinton	March 24, 1995	Incumbent	31 years, 243 days
37	Archibald K. Gardner	8th Cir.	Hoover	May 23, 1929	September 30, 1960	31 years, 130 days
38	Charles Henry Robb	D.C. Cir.	T. Roosevelt	October 5, 1906	November 15, 1937	31 years, 41 days
39	Danny Julian Boggs	6th Cir.	Reagan	March 25, 1986	February 28, 2017	30 years, 340 days
40	Kimbrough Stone	8th Cir.	Wilson	December 21, 1916	May 15, 1947	30 years, 145 days
41	Erskine Mayo Ross	9th Cir.	Cleveland	February 22, 1895	May 31, 1925	30 years, 98 days
42	Diarmuid O'Scannlain	9th Cir.	Reagan	September 26, 1986	December 31, 2016	30 years, 96 days
43	Josiah Alexander Van Orsdel	D.C. Cir.	T. Roosevelt	November 14, 1907	August 7, 1937	29 years, 266 days
44	David L. Bazelon	D.C. Cir.	Truman	October 21, 1949	June 30, 1979	29 years, 252 days
45	Alfred P. Murrah	10th Cir.	F. D. Roosevelt	September 4, 1940	May 1, 1970	29 years, 239 days
46	Julian Mack	7th Cir.	Taft	January 31, 1911	July 1, 1929	29 years, 219 days
46	Julian Mack	2nd Cir.	reassigned	July 1, 1929	September 6, 1940	29 years, 219 days
46	Julian Mack	6th Cir.	reassigned	July 1, 1929	June 30, 1930	29 years, 219 days
47	R. Lanier Anderson III	5th Cir.	Carter	July 13, 1979	October 1, 1981	29 years, 202 days
47	R. Lanier Anderson III	11th Cir.	reassigned	October 1, 1981	January 31, 2009	29 years, 202 days
48	Eric L. Clay	6th Cir.	Clinton	August 1, 1997	Incumbent	29 years, 113 days
49	John Robert Brown	5th Cir.	Eisenhower	July 27, 1955	July 20, 1984	28 years, 359 days
50	John Biggs Jr.	3rd Cir.	F. D. Roosevelt	February 16, 1937	October 30, 1965	28 years, 256 days

=== Total service ===
Rank	Judge	Court	Appointed by	Began active service	Ended active service	Ended senior status	Total service
1	J. Clifford Wallace	9th Cir.	Nixon	June 28, 1972	April 8, 1996	Incumbent	54 years, 147 days
2	Levin H. Campbell	1st Cir.	Nixon	June 30, 1972	January 3, 1992	Incumbent	54 years, 145 days
3	Alfred Goodwin	9th Cir.	Nixon	November 30, 1971	January 31, 1991	December 27, 2022	51 years, 27 days
4	Gerald Bard Tjoflat	5th Cir.	Ford	November 21, 1975	October 1, 1981	—	51 years, 1 day
4	Gerald Bard Tjoflat	11th Cir.	reassigned	October 1, 1981	November 19, 2019	Incumbent	51 years, 1 day
5	William J. Bauer	7th Cir.	Ford	December 20, 1974	October 31, 1994	December 15, 2025	50 years, 360 days
6	James R. Browning	9th Cir.	Kennedy	September 18, 1961	September 1, 2000	May 6, 2012	50 years, 231 days
7	Albert Branson Maris	3rd Cir.	F. D. Roosevelt	June 24, 1938	December 31, 1958	February 7, 1989	50 years, 228 days
8	Thomas Walter Swan	2nd Cir.	Coolidge	December 22, 1926	July 1, 1953	July 13, 1975	48 years, 203 days
9	Myron H. Bright	8th Cir.	L. B. Johnson	June 7, 1968	June 1, 1985	December 12, 2016	48 years, 188 days
10	Wilfred Feinberg	2nd Cir.	L. B. Johnson	March 7, 1966	January 31, 1991	July 31, 2014	48 years, 146 days
11	Amalya Kearse	2nd Cir.	Carter	June 21, 1979	June 11, 2002	Incumbent	47 years, 154 days
11	Jon O. Newman	2nd Cir.	Carter	June 21, 1979	July 1, 1997	Incumbent	47 years, 154 days
13	R. Lanier Anderson III	5th Cir.	Carter	July 13, 1979	October 1, 1981	—	47 years, 132 days
13	R. Lanier Anderson III	11th Cir.	reassigned	October 1, 1981	January 31, 2009	Incumbent	47 years, 132 days
13	Carolyn Dineen King	5th Cir.	Carter	July 13, 1979	December 31, 2013	Incumbent	47 years, 132 days
15	Mary M. Schroeder	9th Cir.	Carter	September 26, 1979	December 31, 2011	Incumbent	47 years, 57 days
16	Stephanie Kulp Seymour	10th Cir.	Carter	November 2, 1979	October 16, 2005	Incumbent	47 years, 20 days
17	Dorothy Wright Nelson	9th Cir.	Carter	December 20, 1979	January 1, 1995	Incumbent	46 years, 337 days
18	Harry T. Edwards	D.C. Cir.	Carter	February 20, 1980	November 3, 2005	Incumbent	46 years, 275 days
19	William Canby	9th Cir.	Carter	May 23, 1980	May 23, 1996	Incumbent	46 years, 183 days
20	Ruggero J. Aldisert	3rd Cir.	L. B. Johnson	July 29, 1968	December 31, 1986	December 28, 2014	46 years, 152 days
21	William Judson Holloway Jr.	10th Cir.	L. B. Johnson	September 16, 1968	May 31, 1992	April 25, 2014	45 years, 221 days
22	Orie Leon Phillips	10th Cir.	Hoover	April 29, 1929	January 1, 1956	November 14, 1974	45 years, 199 days
23	Joseph William Woodrough	8th Cir.	F. D. Roosevelt	April 12, 1933	January 3, 1961	October 2, 1977	44 years, 173 days
24	Peter T. Fay	5th Cir.	Ford	September 21, 1976	October 1, 1981	—	44 years, 132 days
24	Peter T. Fay	11th Cir.	reassigned	October 1, 1981	January 19, 1994	January 31, 2021	44 years, 132 days
25	Patrick Higginbotham	5th Cir.	Reagan	July 30, 1982	August 28, 2006	Incumbent	44 years, 115 days
26	Gilbert S. Merritt Jr.	6th Cir.	Carter	October 31, 1977	January 17, 2001	January 17, 2022	44 years, 78 days
27	Frank M. Coffin	1st Cir.	L. B. Johnson	October 2, 1965	February 1, 1989	December 7, 2009	44 years, 66 days
28	J. Edward Lumbard	2nd Cir.	Eisenhower	July 12, 1955	July 20, 1971	June 3, 1999	43 years, 326 days
29	E. Grady Jolly	5th Cir.	Reagan	July 30, 1982	October 3, 2017	March 16, 2026	43 years, 229 days
30	Pierce Lively	6th Cir.	Nixon	October 5, 1972	January 1, 1989	March 12, 2016	43 years, 159 days
31	John Cooper Godbold	5th Cir.	L. B. Johnson	July 22, 1966	October 1, 1981	—	43 years, 153 days
31	John Cooper Godbold	11th Cir.	reassigned	October 1, 1981	October 23, 1987	December 22, 2009	43 years, 153 days
32	Pasco Bowman II	8th Cir.	Reagan	July 19, 1983	August 1, 2003	Incumbent	43 years, 126 days
33	David L. Bazelon	D.C. Cir.	Truman	October 21, 1949	June 30, 1979	February 19, 1993	43 years, 121 days
34	Dolores Sloviter	3rd Cir.	Carter	June 21, 1979	June 21, 2013	October 12, 2022	43 years, 113 days
35	Leonard I. Garth	3rd Cir.	Nixon	August 6, 1973	June 30, 1986	September 22, 2016	43 years, 47 days
36	Bailey Aldrich	1st Cir.	Eisenhower	September 10, 1959	August 31, 1972	September 25, 2002	43 years, 15 days
37	W. Eugene Davis	5th Cir.	Reagan	November 16, 1983	December 31, 2016	Incumbent	43 years, 6 days
38	Donald Roe Ross	8th Cir.	Nixon	December 12, 1970	June 13, 1987	December 18, 2013	43 years, 6 days
39	Pauline Newman	Fed. Cir.	Reagan	February 28, 1984	Incumbent	—	42 years, 267 days
40	Robert Hugh McWilliams Jr.	10th Cir.	Nixon	October 14, 1970	August 31, 1984	April 10, 2013	42 years, 178 days
41	Monroe G. McKay	10th Cir.	Carter	December 1, 1977	December 31, 1993	March 28, 2020	42 years, 118 days
42	J. Harvie Wilkinson III	4th Cir.	Reagan	August 13, 1984	Incumbent	—	42 years, 101 days
43	John Biggs Jr.	3rd Cir.	F. D. Roosevelt	February 16, 1937	October 30, 1965	April 15, 1979	42 years, 58 days
44	Joseph Chappell Hutcheson Jr.	5th Cir.	Hoover	January 26, 1931	November 4, 1964	January 18, 1973	41 years, 358 days
45	Elbert Tuttle	5th Cir.	Eisenhower	August 4, 1954	June 1, 1968	October 1, 1981	41 years, 324 days
45	Elbert Tuttle	11th Cir.	reassigned	—	—	June 23, 1996	41 years, 324 days
46	John Minor Wisdom	5th Cir.	Eisenhower	June 27, 1957	January 15, 1977	May 15, 1999	41 years, 322 days
47	Frank Easterbrook	7th Cir.	Reagan	April 4, 1985	Incumbent	—	41 years, 232 days
47	Edith Jones	5th Cir.	Reagan	April 4, 1985	Incumbent	—	41 years, 232 days
49	Joel Flaum	7th Cir.	Reagan	May 5, 1983	November 30, 2020	December 4, 2024	41 years, 213 days
50	John Carbone Porfilio	10th Cir.	Reagan	May 10, 1985	October 15, 1999	Incumbent	41 years, 196 days
50	Kenneth Francis Ripple	7th Cir.	Reagan	May 10, 1985	September 1, 2008	Incumbent	41 years, 196 days

== District courts ==
Lists of the 100 longest-serving judges of the district courts by active service and total service:

=== Active service ===
Rank	Judge	Court	Appointed by	Began active service	Ended active service	Total active service
1	Henry Potter	D.N.C.	Jefferson	April 7, 1802	December 20, 1857	55 years, 257 days
2	Manuel Real	C.D. Cal.	L. B. Johnson	November 3, 1966	November 4, 2018	52 years, 1 day
3	Willard Hall	D. Del.	Monroe	May 6, 1823	December 6, 1871	48 years, 214 days
4	Ashur Ware	D. Me.	Monroe	February 15, 1822	May 31, 1866	44 years, 105 days
5	Harold P. Burke	W.D.N.Y.	F. D. Roosevelt	June 18, 1937	June 15, 1981	43 years, 362 days
6	John Jay Jackson Jr.	W.D. Va.	Lincoln	August 3, 1861	June 11, 1864	43 years, 224 days
6	John Jay Jackson Jr.	D. W. Va.	reassigned	June 11, 1864	July 1, 1901	43 years, 224 days
6	John Jay Jackson Jr.	N.D. W. Va.	reassigned	July 1, 1901	March 15, 1905	43 years, 224 days
7	David Norton Edelstein	S.D.N.Y.	Truman	November 1, 1951	November 1, 1994	43 years, 0 days
8	Terrence Boyle	E.D.N.C.	Reagan	May 3, 1984	Incumbent	42 years, 203 days
9	Paul Jones	N.D. Ohio	Harding	March 2, 1923	August 4, 1965	42 years, 155 days
10	John Thomas Copenhaver Jr.	S.D. W. Va.	Ford	September 3, 1976	November 1, 2018	42 years, 59 days
11	Ricardo Hinojosa	S.D. Tex.	Reagan	May 5, 1983	May 21, 2025	42 years, 16 days
12	Stephen Victor Wilson	C.D. Cal.	Reagan	October 17, 1985	Incumbent	41 years, 36 days
12	Henry Travillion Wingate	S.D. Miss.	Reagan	October 17, 1985	Incumbent	41 years, 36 days
14	Elijah Paine	D. Vt.	J. Adams	March 3, 1801	April 1, 1842	41 years, 29 days
15	Joseph L. Tauro	D. Mass.	Nixon	October 17, 1972	September 26, 2013	40 years, 344 days
16	Alan Bond Johnson	D. Wyo.	Reagan	December 17, 1985	Incumbent	40 years, 340 days
17	Carmen Consuelo Cerezo	D.P.R.	Carter	June 30, 1980	February 28, 2021	40 years, 243 days
18	Ogden Hoffman Jr.	N.D. Cal.	Fillmore	February 27, 1851	July 27, 1866	40 years, 163 days
18	Ogden Hoffman Jr.	S.D. Cal.	reassigned	August 31, 1852	January 18, 1854	40 years, 163 days
18	Ogden Hoffman Jr.	D. Cal.	reassigned	July 27, 1866	August 5, 1886	40 years, 163 days
18	Ogden Hoffman Jr.	N.D. Cal.	reassigned	August 5, 1886	August 9, 1891	40 years, 163 days
19	James William Locke	S.D. Fla.	Grant	February 1, 1872	July 4, 1912	40 years, 154 days
20	John Davis	D. Mass.	J. Adams	February 20, 1801	July 10, 1841	40 years, 140 days
21	Samuel Betts	S.D.N.Y.	J. Q. Adams	December 21, 1826	April 30, 1867	40 years, 130 days
22	John Pitman	D.R.I.	Monroe	August 4, 1824	November 17, 1864	40 years, 105 days
23	Harold Loyd Murphy	N.D. Ga.	Carter	July 29, 1977	March 31, 2017	39 years, 245 days
24	Joseph Peter Stadtmueller	E.D. Wis.	Reagan	June 1, 1987	Incumbent	39 years, 174 days
25	J. Robert Elliott	M.D. Ga.	Kennedy	February 17, 1962	December 31, 2000	38 years, 318 days
26	Martin Leach-Cross Feldman	E.D. La.	Reagan	October 5, 1983	January 26, 2022	38 years, 113 days
27	Charles Ronald Norgle Sr.	N.D. Ill.	Reagan	October 4, 1984	October 4, 2022	38 years, 0 days
28	Rensselaer Nelson	D. Minn.	Buchanan	May 20, 1858	May 16, 1896	37 years, 362 days
29	Edward Roscoe Meek	N.D. Tex.	McKinley	July 13, 1898	December 31, 1935	37 years, 171 days
30	Mac Swinford	E.D. Ky. W.D. Ky.	F. D. Roosevelt	August 21, 1937	February 3, 1975	37 years, 166 days
31	Edward Weinfeld	S.D.N.Y.	Truman	August 5, 1950	January 17, 1988	37 years, 165 days
32	Lynn Hughes	S.D. Tex.	Reagan	December 17, 1985	February 12, 2023	37 years, 57 days
33	John C. Knox	S.D.N.Y.	Wilson	April 12, 1918	April 30, 1955	37 years, 18 days
34	Mary Lou Robinson	N.D. Tex.	Carter	April 26, 1979	February 11, 2016	36 years, 291 days
35	Elizabeth A. Kovachevich	M.D. Fla.	Reagan	March 9, 1982	December 14, 2018	36 years, 280 days
36	Humphrey H. Leavitt	D. Ohio	Jackson	June 30, 1834	February 10, 1855	36 years, 275 days
36	Humphrey H. Leavitt	S.D. Ohio	reassigned	February 10, 1855	April 1, 1871	36 years, 275 days
37	William Elwood Steckler	S.D. Ind.	Truman	April 7, 1950	December 31, 1986	36 years, 268 days
38	Richard Peters	D. Pa.	Washington	January 12, 1792	April 20, 1818	36 years, 223 days
38	Richard Peters	E.D. Pa.	reassigned	April 20, 1818	August 22, 1828	36 years, 223 days
39	John McNairy	D. Tenn.	Washington	February 20, 1797	April 29, 1802	36 years, 193 days
39	John McNairy	E.D. Tenn. W.D. Tenn.	reassigned	April 29, 1802	September 1, 1833	36 years, 193 days
40	David C. Norton	D.S.C.	G. H. W. Bush	July 12, 1990	Incumbent	36 years, 133 days
41	William G. Young	D. Mass.	Reagan	April 4, 1985	July 1, 2021	36 years, 88 days
42	Gunnar Nordbye	D. Minn.	Hoover	March 18, 1931	March 6, 1967	35 years, 353 days
43	Charles L. Brieant	S.D.N.Y.	Nixon	July 29, 1971	May 31, 2007	35 years, 306 days
44	James M. Love	D. Iowa	Pierce	October 5, 1855	July 20, 1882	35 years, 270 days
44	James M. Love	S.D. Iowa	reassigned	July 20, 1882	July 2, 1891	35 years, 270 days
45	Matthew Harvey	D.N.H.	Jackson	November 2, 1830	April 7, 1866	35 years, 156 days
46	Alexander Boarman	W.D. La.	Garfield	May 18, 1881	August 30, 1916	35 years, 104 days
47	Robert Love Taylor	E.D. Tenn.	Truman	November 2, 1949	January 15, 1985	35 years, 74 days
48	James Edmund Boyd	W.D.N.C.	McKinley	July 11, 1900	August 21, 1935	35 years, 41 days
49	Rya W. Zobel	D. Mass.	Carter	March 23, 1979	April 1, 2014	35 years, 9 days
50	K. Michael Moore	S.D. Fla.	G. H. W. Bush	February 10, 1992	Incumbent	34 years, 285 days
51	Robert Alexander Inch	E.D.N.Y.	Harding/Coolidge	April 28, 1923	January 6, 1958	34 years, 253 days
52	Thomas Charles Munger	D. Neb.	T. Roosevelt	March 1, 1907	July 31, 1941	34 years, 152 days
53	Allen Sharp	N.D. Ind.	Nixon	October 11, 1973	November 1, 2007	34 years, 21 days
54	Matthew Deady	D. Ore.	Buchanan	March 9, 1859	March 24, 1893	34 years, 15 days
55	Thomas Blake Kennedy	D. Wyo.	Harding	October 25, 1921	November 6, 1955	34 years, 12 days
56	Francis Ford	D. Mass.	F. D. Roosevelt	June 24, 1938	July 1, 1972	34 years, 7 days
57	Emory Speer	S.D. Ga.	Arthur	February 18, 1885	December 13, 1918	33 years, 298 days
58	Tillman D. Johnson	D. Utah	Wilson	November 2, 1915	May 28, 1949	33 years, 207 days
59	Steven Douglas Merryday	M.D. Fla.	G. H. W. Bush	February 10, 1992	August 31, 2025	33 years, 202 days
60	William Truslow Newman	N.D. Ga.	Cleveland	August 13, 1886	February 14, 1920	33 years, 185 days
61	Charles Nelson Pray	D. Mont.	Coolidge	February 8, 1924	April 10, 1957	33 years, 61 days
62	William Bondy	S.D.N.Y.	Harding	March 2, 1923	May 1, 1956	33 years, 60 days
63	John Calvin Pollock	D. Kan.	T. Roosevelt	December 1, 1903	January 24, 1937	33 years, 54 days
64	Andrew McConnell January Cochran	E.D. Ky.	McKinley/T. Roosevelt	April 24, 1901	June 12, 1934	33 years, 49 days
65	Leonie Brinkema	E.D. Va.	Clinton	October 20, 1993	Incumbent	33 years, 33 days
66	Ross Wilkins	D. Mich.	Jackson	January 26, 1837	February 24, 1863	33 years, 23 days
66	Ross Wilkins	E.D. Mich.	reassigned	February 24, 1863	February 18, 1870	33 years, 23 days
67	William E. Baker	N.D. W. Va.	Harding	April 4, 1921	April 3, 1954	32 years, 364 days
68	Richard G. Stearns	D. Mass.	Clinton	November 24, 1993	Incumbent	32 years, 363 days
69	Allen Burroughs Hannay	S.D. Tex.	F. D. Roosevelt	August 12, 1942	August 6, 1975	32 years, 359 days
70	Thomas John Morris	D. Md.	Hayes	July 1, 1879	June 6, 1912	32 years, 341 days
71	Myron H. Thompson	M.D. Ala.	Carter	September 29, 1980	August 22, 2013	32 years, 327 days
72	Samuel Frederick Biery Jr.	W.D. Tex.	Clinton	March 11, 1994	Incumbent	32 years, 256 days
72	Orlando Luis Garcia	W.D. Tex.	Clinton	March 11, 1994	Incumbent	32 years, 256 days
74	Nathaniel M. Gorton	D. Mass.	G. H. W. Bush	September 24, 1992	May 31, 2025	32 years, 249 days
75	Lee H. Rosenthal	S.D. Tex.	G. H. W. Bush	May 13, 1992	December 1, 2024	32 years, 202 days
76	Frank J. Battisti	N.D. Ohio	Kennedy	September 22, 1961	April 1, 1994	32 years, 191 days
77	Sidney A. Fitzwater	N.D. Tex.	Reagan	March 19, 1986	September 22, 2018	32 years, 187 days
78	Jennings Bailey	S.C.D.C.	Wilson	May 22, 1918	June 25, 1936	32 years, 163 days
78	Jennings Bailey	D.D.C.	reassigned	June 25, 1936	November 1, 1950	32 years, 163 days
79	Stephen Sanders Chandler Jr.	W.D. Okla.	F. D. Roosevelt	May 13, 1943	October 20, 1975	32 years, 160 days
80	Arthur J. Tuttle	E.D. Mich.	Taft	August 6, 1912	December 2, 1944	32 years, 118 days
81	John G. Koeltl	S.D.N.Y.	Clinton	August 10, 1994	Incumbent	32 years, 104 days
82	Samuel H. Treat	S.D. Ill.	Pierce	March 3, 1855	March 27, 1887	32 years, 24 days
83	William H. Atwell	N.D. Tex.	Harding	January 9, 1923	December 31, 1954	31 years, 356 days
84	Walter Scott Smith Jr.	W.D. Tex.	Reagan	October 4, 1984	September 14, 2016	31 years, 346 days
85	Charles L. Benedict	E.D.N.Y.	Lincoln	March 9, 1865	January 1, 1897	31 years, 298 days
86	Charles F. Amidon	D.N.D.	Cleveland	August 31, 1896	June 2, 1928	31 years, 276 days
87	David Lynn Russell	E.D. Okla. N.D. Okla.	Reagan	December 17, 1981	December 1, 1990	31 years, 202 days
87	David Lynn Russell	W.D. Okla.	Reagan	December 17, 1981	July 7, 2013	31 years, 202 days
88	Joseph R. Goodwin	S.D. W. Va.	Clinton	May 10, 1995	Incumbent	31 years, 196 days
89	Barbara Jacobs Rothstein	W.D. Wash.	Carter	February 20, 1980	September 1, 2011	31 years, 193 days
90	Samuel Hugh Dillin	S.D. Ind.	Kennedy	September 22, 1961	March 31, 1993	31 years, 190 days
91	Colin Neblett	D.N.M.	Wilson	February 5, 1917	July 6, 1948	31 years, 152 days
92	James Thomas Foley	N.D.N.Y.	Truman	February 2, 1949	June 30, 1980	31 years, 149 days
93	William J. Zloch	S.D. Fla.	Reagan	November 4, 1985	January 31, 2017	31 years, 88 days
94	William H. Kirkpatrick	E.D. Pa.	Coolidge	March 3, 1927	May 1, 1958	31 years, 59 days
95	John Alden Riner	D. Wyo.	B. Harrison	September 22, 1890	October 31, 1921	31 years, 39 days
96	George Clinton Sweeney	D. Mass.	F. D. Roosevelt	August 24, 1935	September 30, 1966	31 years, 37 days
97	Henry W. Goddard	S.D.N.Y.	Harding	January 4, 1923	February 1, 1954	31 years, 28 days
98	Clarence Addison Brimmer Jr.	D. Wyo.	Ford	September 16, 1975	September 27, 2006	31 years, 11 days
99	Patti B. Saris	D. Mass.	Clinton	November 24, 1993	December 2, 2024	31 years, 8 days
100	Sim Lake	S.D. Tex.	Reagan	August 12, 1988	July 5, 2019	30 years, 327 days

=== Total service ===
Rank	Judge	Court	Appointed by	Began active service	Ended active service	Ended senior status	Total service
1	William Joseph Nealon Jr.	M.D. Pa.	Kennedy	December 13, 1962	January 1, 1989	August 30, 2018	55 years, 260 days
2	Henry Potter	D.N.C.	Jefferson	April 7, 1802	December 20, 1857	—	55 years, 257 days
3	James Lawrence King	S.D. Fla.	Nixon	October 19, 1970	December 20, 1992	May 2, 2026	55 years, 195 days
4	Seybourn Harris Lynne	N.D. Ala.	Truman	January 3, 1946	January 9, 1973	September 10, 2000	54 years, 251 days
5	Edward J. McManus	N.D. Iowa	Kennedy	July 16, 1962	February 9, 1985	March 20, 2017	54 years, 247 days
6	Jack B. Weinstein	E.D.N.Y.	L. B. Johnson	April 15, 1967	March 1, 1993	June 15, 2021	54 years, 61 days
7	George C. Young	N.D. Fla. S.D. Fla.	Kennedy	September 18, 1961	September 17, 1966	—	53 years, 218 days
7	George C. Young	M.D. Fla.	reassigned	October 29, 1962	October 19, 1981	April 24, 2015	53 years, 218 days
8	Manuel Real	C.D. Cal.	L. B. Johnson	November 3, 1966	November 4, 2018	June 26, 2019	52 years, 235 days
9	Donald Alsop	D. Minn.	Ford	December 20, 1974	August 28, 1992	Incumbent	51 years, 337 days
10	John P. Fullam	E.D. Pa.	L. B. Johnson	August 11, 1966	April 1, 1990	March 8, 2018	51 years, 209 days
11	Alexander Harvey II	D. Md.	L. B. Johnson	September 22, 1966	March 8, 1991	December 4, 2017	51 years, 73 days
12	William Augustus Bootle	M.D. Ga.	Eisenhower	May 20, 1954	March 11, 1972	January 25, 2005	50 years, 250 days
13	Charles S. Haight Jr.	S.D.N.Y.	Ford	March 29, 1976	September 23, 1995	Incumbent	50 years, 238 days
14	Myron Donovan Crocker	S.D. Cal.	Eisenhower	September 21, 1959	September 18, 1966	—	50 years, 134 days
14	Myron Donovan Crocker	E.D. Cal.	reassigned	September 18, 1966	January 1, 1981	February 2, 2010	50 years, 134 days
15	Charles Miller Metzner	S.D.N.Y.	Eisenhower	September 10, 1959	September 30, 1977	November 30, 2009	50 years, 81 days
16	Walter T. McGovern	W.D. Wash.	Nixon	April 23, 1971	September 30, 1987	July 8, 2021	50 years, 76 days
17	Carl Olaf Bue Jr.	S.D. Tex.	Nixon	October 15, 1970	September 2, 1987	December 24, 2020	50 years, 70 days
18	William Henry Stafford Jr.	N.D. Fla.	Ford	May 14, 1975	May 31, 1996	July 14, 2025	50 years, 61 days
19	William Terrell Hodges	M.D. Fla.	Nixon	December 15, 1971	May 2, 1999	January 4, 2022	50 years, 20 days
20	Wesley E. Brown	D. Kan.	Kennedy	April 4, 1962	September 1, 1979	January 23, 2012	49 years, 294 days
21	John Thomas Copenhaver Jr.	S.D. W. Va.	Ford	September 3, 1976	November 1, 2018	May 12, 2026	49 years, 251 days
22	Edward Louis Filippine	E.D. Mo.	Carter	July 22, 1977	June 11, 1995	Incumbent	49 years, 123 days
23	John Thomas Curtin	W.D.N.Y.	L. B. Johnson	December 14, 1967	July 1, 1989	April 14, 2017	49 years, 121 days
24	Daniel Holcombe Thomas	S.D. Ala.	Truman	March 9, 1951	August 25, 1971	April 13, 2000	49 years, 35 days
25	John L. Kane Jr.	D. Colo.	Carter	December 16, 1977	April 8, 1988	Incumbent	48 years, 341 days
26	David Norton Edelstein	S.D.N.Y.	Truman	November 1, 1951	November 1, 1994	August 19, 2000	48 years, 292 days
27	Donald West VanArtsdalen	E.D. Pa.	Nixon	October 15, 1970	October 21, 1985	May 21, 2019	48 years, 218 days
28	Willard Hall	D. Del.	Monroe	May 6, 1823	December 6, 1871	—	48 years, 214 days
29	John William Ditter Jr.	E.D. Pa.	Nixon	October 15, 1970	October 19, 1986	April 7, 2019	48 years, 174 days
30	Edwin F. Hunter	W.D. La.	Eisenhower	October 3, 1953	February 19, 1976	February 22, 2002	48 years, 142 days
31	Frederick Jacob Reagan Heebe	E.D. La.	L. B. Johnson	March 26, 1966	August 26, 1992	August 10, 2014	48 years, 137 days
32	John C. Knox	S.D.N.Y.	Wilson	April 12, 1918	April 30, 1955	August 23, 1966	48 years, 133 days
33	Jose Alejandro Gonzalez Jr.	S.D. Fla.	Carter	July 28, 1978	November 30, 1996	Incumbent	48 years, 117 days
34	Albert Vickers Bryan Jr.	E.D. Va.	Nixon	July 29, 1971	December 1, 1991	August 27, 2019	48 years, 29 days
35	William Joseph Campbell	N.D. Ill.	F. D. Roosevelt	October 10, 1940	March 19, 1970	October 19, 1988	48 years, 9 days
36	Samuel Conti	N.D. Cal.	Nixon	October 16, 1970	November 1, 1987	August 29, 2018	47 years, 317 days
37	Albert L. Reeves	W.D. Mo.	Harding	June 24, 1923	February 2, 1954	March 24, 1971	47 years, 273 days
38	William Benner Enright	S.D. Cal.	Nixon	June 30, 1972	July 12, 1990	March 7, 2020	47 years, 251 days
39	Marvin Aspen	N.D. Ill.	Carter	July 24, 1979	July 1, 2002	Incumbent	47 years, 121 days
39	Orinda Dale Evans	N.D. Ga.	Carter	July 24, 1979	December 31, 2008	Incumbent	47 years, 121 days
41	Garnett Thomas Eisele	E.D. Ark.	Nixon	August 6, 1970	August 1, 1991	November 26, 2017	47 years, 112 days
42	Marion Speed Boyd	W.D. Tenn.	F. D. Roosevelt	September 27, 1940	August 1, 1966	January 9, 1988	47 years, 104 days
43	Rya W. Zobel	D. Mass.	Carter	March 23, 1979	April 1, 2014	July 4, 2026	47 years, 103 days
44	James Hughes Hancock	N.D. Ala.	Nixon	April 17, 1973	May 1, 1996	July 24, 2020	47 years, 98 days
45	Warren Keith Urbom	D. Neb.	Nixon	April 24, 1970	December 31, 1990	July 28, 2017	47 years, 95 days
46	Howard F. Sachs	W.D. Mo.	Carter	September 26, 1979	October 31, 1992	Incumbent	47 years, 57 days
47	James von der Heydt	D. Alaska	L. B. Johnson	November 3, 1966	July 15, 1984	December 1, 2013	47 years, 28 days
48	Barbara Brandriff Crabb	W.D. Wis.	Carter	November 2, 1979	March 24, 2010	Incumbent	47 years, 20 days
48	Anne Elise Thompson	D.N.J.	Carter	November 2, 1979	June 1, 2001	Incumbent	47 years, 20 days
50	Frank Howell Seay	E.D. Okla.	Carter	November 2, 1979	September 25, 2003	November 1, 2026	46 years, 364 days
51	William Bertelsman	E.D. Ky.	Carter	November 27, 1979	February 1, 2001	Incumbent	46 years, 360 days
51	Dudley Hollingsworth Bowen Jr.	S.D. Ga.	Carter	November 27, 1979	June 25, 2006	Incumbent	46 years, 360 days
53	Terry J. Hatter Jr.	C.D. Cal.	Carter	December 20, 1979	April 22, 2005	Incumbent	46 years, 337 days
54	Barbara Jacobs Rothstein	W.D. Wash.	Carter	February 20, 1980	September 1, 2011	Incumbent	46 years, 275 days
55	William Clark O'Kelley	N.D. Ga.	Nixon	October 16, 1970	October 1, 1996	July 5, 2017	46 years, 262 days
56	George M. Bourquin	D. Mont.	Taft	March 8, 1912	March 9, 1934	November 15, 1958	46 years, 252 days
57	Gunnar Nordbye	D. Minn.	Hoover	March 18, 1931	March 6, 1967	November 5, 1977	46 years, 232 days
58	Roy Winfield Harper	E.D. Mo. W.D. Mo.	Truman	August 7, 1947	December 19, 1947	—	46 years, 187 days
58	Roy Winfield Harper	E.D. Mo. W.D. Mo.	Truman	December 20, 1947	June 20, 1948	—	46 years, 187 days
58	Roy Winfield Harper	E.D. Mo. W.D. Mo.	Truman	June 22, 1948	January 5, 1971	February 13, 1994	46 years, 187 days
59	William Earl Britt	E.D.N.C.	Carter	May 23, 1980	December 7, 1997	Incumbent	46 years, 183 days
59	Walter Herbert Rice	S.D. Ohio	Carter	May 23, 1980	November 30, 2004	Incumbent	46 years, 183 days
61	Charles William Kraft Jr.	E.D. Pa.	Eisenhower	August 12, 1955	November 11, 1970	January 18, 2002	46 years, 159 days
62	Thelton Henderson	N.D. Cal.	Carter	June 30, 1980	November 28, 1998	Incumbent	46 years, 145 days
63	Myron H. Thompson	M.D. Ala.	Carter	September 29, 1980	August 22, 2013	Incumbent	46 years, 54 days
64	Charles P. Kocoras	N.D. Ill.	Carter	September 30, 1980	June 30, 2006	Incumbent	46 years, 53 days
64	Consuelo Bland Marshall	C.D. Cal.	Carter	September 30, 1980	October 24, 2005	Incumbent	46 years, 53 days
66	Joseph L. Tauro	D. Mass.	Nixon	October 17, 1972	September 26, 2013	November 30, 2018	46 years, 44 days
67	Stephen Sanders Chandler Jr.	W.D. Okla.	F. D. Roosevelt	May 13, 1943	October 20, 1975	April 27, 1989	45 years, 349 days
68	Caleb Merrill Wright	D. Del.	Eisenhower	July 27, 1955	October 8, 1973	May 12, 2001	45 years, 289 days
69	Maurice B. Cohill Jr.	W.D. Pa.	Ford	May 21, 1976	November 28, 1994	January 1, 2022	45 years, 225 days
70	R. James Harvey	E.D. Mich.	Nixon	December 19, 1973	March 31, 1984	July 20, 2019	45 years, 213 days
71	Dan Monroe Russell Jr.	S.D. Miss.	L. B. Johnson	October 2, 1965	October 25, 1983	April 16, 2011	45 years, 196 days
72	James Paul Churchill	E.D. Mich.	Ford	December 20, 1974	December 31, 1989	June 29, 2020	45 years, 192 days
73	Thomas Virgil Pittman	M.D. Ala.	L. B. Johnson	June 29, 1966	June 2, 1970	—	45 years, 191 days
73	Thomas Virgil Pittman	S.D. Ala.	L. B. Johnson	June 29, 1966	July 15, 1981	January 6, 2012	45 years, 191 days
74	Elijah Allen Cox	N.D. Miss.	Coolidge	March 2, 1929	March 22, 1957	August 28, 1974	45 years, 179 days
75	Thomas P. Griesa	S.D.N.Y.	Nixon	June 30, 1972	March 13, 2000	December 24, 2017	45 years, 177 days
76	Joyce Hens Green	D.D.C.	Carter	May 11, 1979	July 1, 1995	October 10, 2024	45 years, 152 days
76	Harold Loyd Murphy	N.D. Ga.	Carter	July 29, 1977	March 31, 2017	December 28, 2022	45 years, 152 days
78	William Daniel Murray	D. Mont.	Truman	May 9, 1949	December 31, 1965	October 3, 1994	45 years, 147 days
79	Robert Earl Maxwell	N.D. W. Va.	L. B. Johnson	August 11, 1965	July 19, 1995	November 20, 2010	45 years, 101 days
80	Richard Paul Matsch	D. Colo.	Nixon	March 8, 1974	July 1, 2003	May 26, 2019	45 years, 79 days
81	John C. Coughenour	W.D. Wash.	Reagan	September 28, 1981	July 27, 2006	Incumbent	45 years, 55 days
82	Bruce Sterling Jenkins	D. Utah	Carter	September 22, 1978	September 30, 1994	November 7, 2023	45 years, 46 days
83	Sylvia Rambo	M.D. Pa.	Carter	July 24, 1979	April 18, 2001	August 30, 2024	45 years, 37 days
84	Hayden Wilson Head Jr.	S.D. Tex.	Reagan	October 26, 1981	November 13, 2009	Incumbent	45 years, 27 days
84	James Robertson Nowlin	W.D. Tex.	Reagan	October 26, 1981	May 31, 2003	Incumbent	45 years, 27 days
86	Paul A. Magnuson	D. Minn.	Reagan	October 29, 1981	February 9, 2002	Incumbent	45 years, 24 days
87	Joseph Putnam Willson	W.D. Pa.	Eisenhower	July 14, 1953	October 18, 1968	August 3, 1998	45 years, 20 days
88	I. Leo Glasser	E.D.N.Y.	Reagan	December 10, 1981	July 1, 1993	Incumbent	44 years, 347 days
89	David Lynn Russell	E.D. Okla. N.D. Okla.	Reagan	December 17, 1981	December 1, 1990	—	44 years, 340 days
89	David Lynn Russell	W.D. Okla.	Reagan	December 17, 1981	July 7, 2013	Incumbent	44 years, 340 days
90	Alan N. Bloch	W.D. Pa.	Carter	November 2, 1979	April 12, 1997	October 6, 2024	44 years, 339 days
91	William Elwood Steckler	S.D. Ind.	Truman	April 7, 1950	December 31, 1986	March 8, 1995	44 years, 335 days
92	Solomon Blatt Jr.	D.S.C.	Nixon	May 28, 1971	May 7, 1990	April 20, 2016	44 years, 328 days
93	James Tyne Moody	N.D. Ind.	Reagan	February 9, 1982	June 17, 2003	Incumbent	44 years, 286 days
94	Charles Wycliffe Joiner	E.D. Mich.	Nixon	June 9, 1972	August 15, 1984	March 10, 2017	44 years, 274 days
95	Gordon Thompson Jr.	S.D. Cal.	Nixon	October 16, 1970	December 28, 1994	July 5, 2015	44 years, 262 days
96	Elizabeth A. Kovachevich	M.D. Fla.	Reagan	March 9, 1982	December 14, 2018	Incumbent	44 years, 258 days
97	Charles Edward Wyzanski Jr.	D. Mass.	F. D. Roosevelt	December 19, 1941	September 1, 1971	September 3, 1986	44 years, 258 days
98	Jennings Bailey	S.C.D.C.	Wilson	May 22, 1918	June 25, 1936	—	44 years, 232 days
98	Jennings Bailey	D.D.C.	reassigned	June 25, 1936	November 1, 1950	January 9, 1963	44 years, 232 days
99	Frederick Alvin Daugherty	E.D. Okla. N.D. Okla. W.D. Okla.	Kennedy	October 5, 1961	January 12, 1982	April 7, 2006	44 years, 184 days
100	Matthew Francis McGuire	D.D.C.	F. D. Roosevelt	August 1, 1941	October 7, 1966	January 24, 1986	44 years, 176 days

== See also ==
- List of United States Supreme Court justices by time in office
- Deaths of United States federal judges in active service
- List of longest-serving members of the United States Congress
