= Philip Neville =

United States district judge (1909–1974)

Judge of the United States District Court for the District of Minnesota
- In office July 31, 1967 – February 13, 1974
- Appointed by: Lyndon B. Johnson
- Preceded by: Gunnar Nordbye
- Succeeded by: Donald Alsop

Personal details
- Born: Philip Neville; November 5, 1909 Minneapolis, Minnesota, U.S.
- Died: February 13, 1974 (aged 64)
- Education: University of Minnesota (B.A.); University of Minnesota Law School (LL.B.)

Philip Neville (November 5, 1909 – February 13, 1974) was a United States district judge of the United States District Court for the District of Minnesota.

== Education and career ==
Born in Minneapolis, Minnesota, Neville received a Bachelor of Arts degree from the University of Minnesota in 1931, and a Bachelor of Laws from the University of Minnesota Law School in 1933. He was a law clerk for the Supreme Court of Minnesota from 1933 to 1935, and then was in private practice of law until 1967. He was also a professor at the University of Minnesota Law School from 1937 to 1967. He was a municipal judge for the village of Edina, Minnesota from 1948 to 1952. He was the United States Attorney for the District of Minnesota from 1952 to 1953.

== Federal judicial service ==
Neville was nominated by President Lyndon B. Johnson on May 24, 1967, to a seat on the United States District Court for the District of Minnesota vacated by Judge Gunnar Nordbye. He was confirmed by the United States Senate on July 31, 1967, and received his commission the same day. Neville remained in this position until his death on February 13, 1974.

== Sources ==
Legal offices
Preceded by Gunnar Nordbye	Judge of the United States District Court for the District of Minnesota; 1967–1974	Succeeded by Donald Alsop
