= Harry H. MacLaughlin =

American judge

Harry Hunter MacLaughlin

Senior Judge of the United States District Court for the District of Minnesota
- In office October 1, 1992 – May 3, 2005

Chief Judge of the United States District Court for the District of Minnesota
- In office 1992–1992
- Preceded by: Donald Alsop
- Succeeded by: Diana E. Murphy

Judge of the United States District Court for the District of Minnesota
- In office September 19, 1977 – October 1, 1992
- Appointed by: Jimmy Carter
- Preceded by: Earl R. Larson
- Succeeded by: Michael J. Davis

Personal details
- Born: Harry Hunter MacLaughlin; August 9, 1927 Breckenridge, Minnesota
- Died: May 3, 2005 (aged 77) Edina, Minnesota
- Education: University of Minnesota (BBA); University of Minnesota Law School (LLB)

Harry Hunter MacLaughlin (August 9, 1927 – May 3, 2005) was a United States district judge of the United States District Court for the District of Minnesota.

== Education and career ==
Born in Breckenridge, Minnesota, MacLaughlin was in the United States Navy as a yeoman from 1945 to 1946. He received a Bachelor of Business Administration from the University of Minnesota in 1949 and a Bachelor of Laws from the University of Minnesota Law School in 1956. He was in private practice in Minneapolis, Minnesota from 1956 to 1972. He was an adjunct professor at William Mitchell College of Law from 1958 to 1963. He was an associate justice of the Minnesota Supreme Court from 1972 to 1977. He was a lecturer at the University of Minnesota Law School from 1973 to 1986.

== Federal judicial service ==
MacLaughlin was nominated by President Jimmy Carter on August 4, 1977, to a seat on the United States District Court for the District of Minnesota vacated by Judge Earl R. Larson. He was confirmed by the United States Senate on September 16, 1977, and received his commission on September 19, 1977. He served as Chief Judge in 1992. He assumed senior status on October 1, 1992. MacLaughlin served in that capacity until his death on May 3, 2005, in Edina, Minnesota.

Legal offices
Preceded by Earl R. Larson	Judge of the United States District Court for the District of Minnesota; 1977–1992	Succeeded by Michael J. Davis
Preceded by Donald Alsop	Chief Judge of the United States District Court for the District of Minnesota; 1992	Succeeded by Diana E. Murphy
