= Rensselaer Nelson =

American judge (1826–1904)

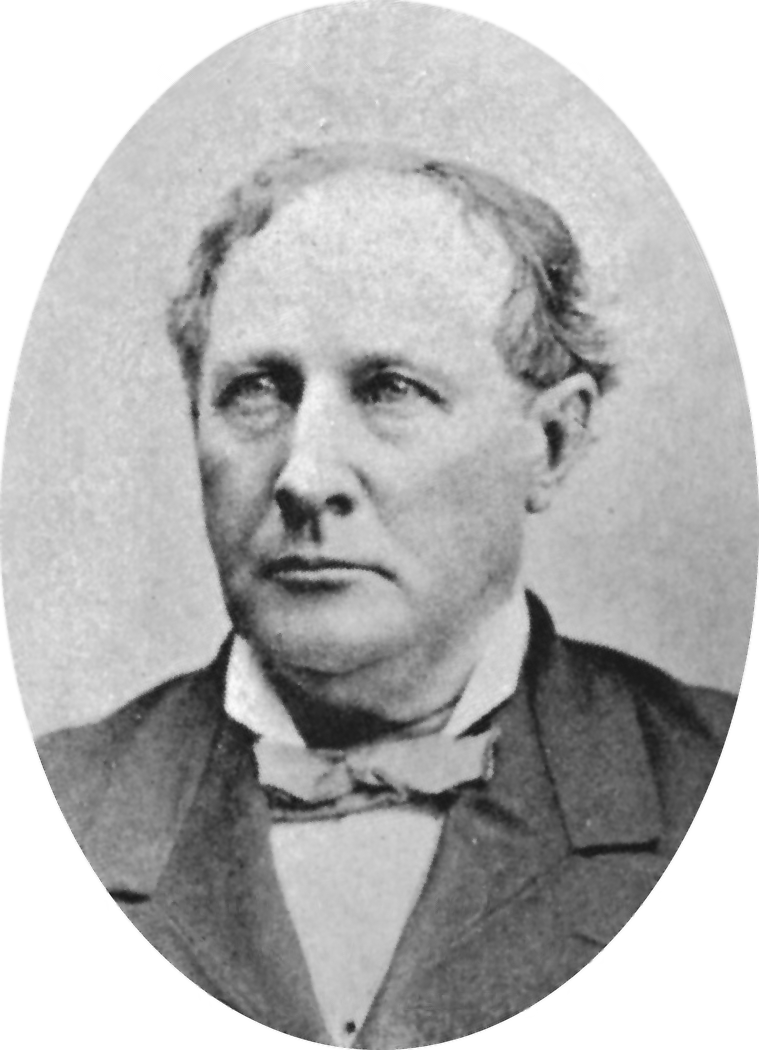

Judge of the United States District Court for the District of Minnesota
- In office May 30, 1858 – May 16, 1896
- Appointed by: James Buchanan
- Preceded by: Seat established by 11 Stat. 285
- Succeeded by: William Lochren

Personal details
- Born: Rensselaer Russell Nelson; May 12, 1826 Cooperstown, New York
- Died: October 15, 1904 (aged 78) Saint Paul, Minnesota
- Party: Democratic
- Parent: Samuel Nelson (father)
- Education: Yale University read law
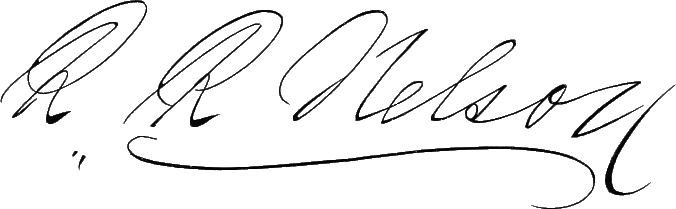
- Signature

Rensselaer Russell Nelson (May 12, 1826 – October 15, 1904) was a United States district judge of the United States District Court for the District of Minnesota. He was the son of United States Supreme Court Justice Samuel Nelson.

== Education and career ==
Born on May 12, 1826, in Cooperstown, New York, Nelson attended Hartwick Seminary, then graduated from Yale University in 1846 and read law with James R. Whiting of New York City in 1849. At Yale he was a member of Skull and Bones. He entered private practice in Buffalo, New York from 1849 to 1850. He continued private practice in Saint Paul, Minnesota Territory from 1850 to 1853, and from 1855 to 1857. He was county attorney of Douglas County, Wisconsin from 1853 to 1855. He was an associate justice of the Supreme Court of Minnesota Territory from 1857 to 1858. Nelson was a member of the Democratic Party.

== Federal judicial service ==
Following the admission of the State of Minnesota to the Union on May 11, 1858, Nelson was nominated by President James Buchanan on May 20, 1858, to the United States District Court for the District of Minnesota, to a new seat authorized by 11 Stat. 285. He was confirmed by the United States Senate on May 30, 1858, and received his commission the same day. His service terminated on May 16, 1896, due to his retirement, by when he was the last federal judge in active service to have been appointed by President Buchanan. His retirement, although expected due to his age and length of service, was still surprising considering:

There was considerable surprise in the United States Court to-day over the retirement of Judge Nelson. He was in the midst of a trial when he astonished every one by dismissing the jury, adjourning court, and announcing his retirement to private life. Judge Nelson is the oldest Judge in point of service on the federal bench, having been appointed nearly forty years ago.

== Later career and death ==
Following his retirement from the federal bench, Nelson resumed private practice in Saint Paul from 1896 to 1904. He died on October 15, 1904, in Saint Paul.

== Family ==
Nelson was the fourth child of United States Supreme Court Justice Samuel Nelson and Catharine Ann Russell, his father's second wife. On November 2, 1858, Nelson was married to Mrs. Emma Fuller (née Beebee) Wright (1832–1886). They had two children.

== See also ==
- List of United States federal judges by longevity of service

== Sources ==
Legal offices
Preceded by Seat established by 11 Stat. 285	Judge of the United States District Court for the District of Minnesota; 1858–1896	Succeeded by William Lochren
