= List of federal judges appointed by James Buchanan =

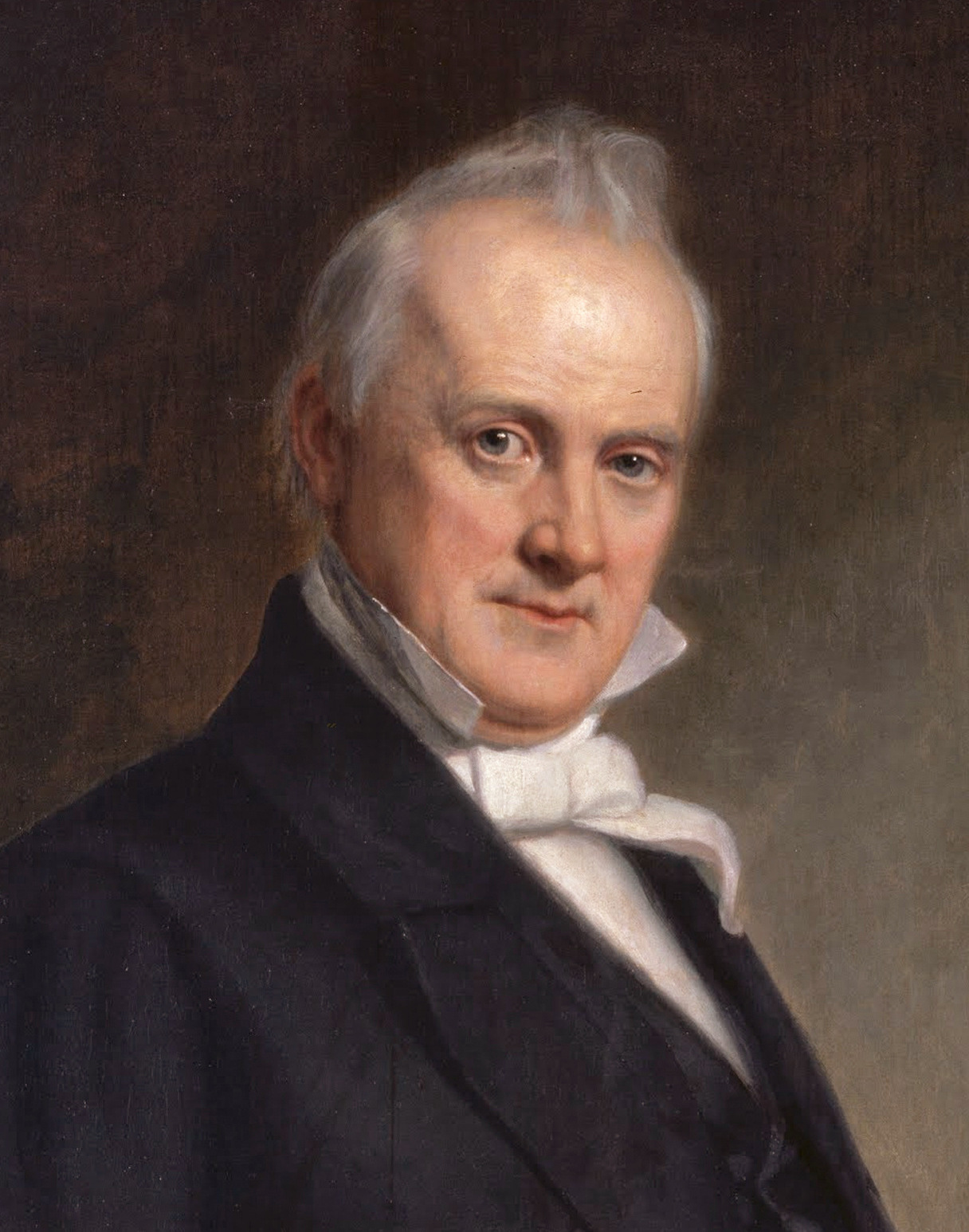
President Buchanan.

Following is a list of all Article III United States federal judges appointed by President James Buchanan during his presidency. In total Buchanan appointed 8 Article III federal judges, including 1 Associate Justice to the Supreme Court of the United States, and 7 judges to the United States district courts. Buchanan appointed no judges to the United States circuit courts during his time in office.

Buchanan appointed 2 judges to the United States Court of Claims, an Article I tribunal.

Buchanan's only Supreme Court appointee, Nathan Clifford.

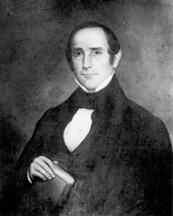
Asa Biggs, named by Buchanan to the United States District Court for the District of North Carolina.

== United States Supreme Court justices ==
#	Justice	Seat	State	Former justice	Nomination date	Confirmation date	Began active service	Ended active service
1	Nathan Clifford	2	Maine	Benjamin Robbins Curtis	December 9, 1857	January 12, 1858	January 12, 1858	July 25, 1881

== District courts ==
#	Judge	Court (Note: See List of United States district and territorial courts)	Nomination date	Confirmation date	Began active service	Ended active service
1	John Cadwalader	E.D. Pa.	April 19, 1858	April 24, 1858	April 24, 1858	January 26, 1879
2	Asa Biggs	D.N.C.	May 3, 1858	May 3, 1858	May 3, 1858	April 23, 1861
3	Rensselaer Nelson	D. Minn.	May 20, 1858	May 30, 1858	May 20, 1858	May 16, 1896
4	Wilson McCandless	W.D. Pa.	February 3, 1859	February 8, 1859	February 8, 1859	July 24, 1876
5	Matthew Deady	D. Ore.	March 7, 1859	March 9, 1859	March 9, 1859	March 24, 1893
6	William Giles Jones	M.D. Ala. N.D. Ala. S.D. Ala.	January 23, 1860	January 30, 1860	September 29, 1859	January 12, 1861
7	William Davis Shipman	D. Conn.	February 28, 1860	March 12, 1860	March 12, 1860	April 16, 1873

== Specialty courts (Article I) ==
=== United States Court of Claims ===
#	Judge	Nomination date	Confirmation date	Began active service	Ended active service
1	Edward G. Loring	May 3, 1858	May 6, 1858	May 6, 1858	December 14, 1877
2	James Hughes	January 12, 1860	January 18, 1860	January 18, 1860	December 1, 1864

== Sources ==
- Federal Judicial Center
