= William Lochren =

American judge

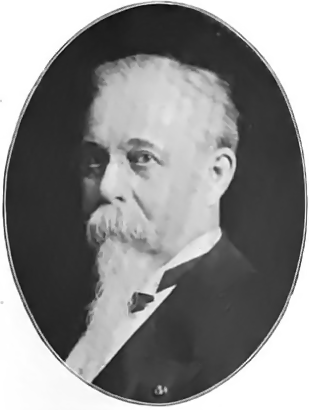

Judge of the United States District Court for the District of Minnesota
- In office May 18, 1896 – July 11, 1908
- Appointed by: Grover Cleveland
- Preceded by: Rensselaer Nelson
- Succeeded by: Milton D. Purdy

Member of the Minnesota Senate
- In office 1869–1870

Personal details
- Born: William Lochren; April 3, 1832 County Tyrone, Ireland
- Died: January 27, 1912 (aged 79) Minneapolis, Minnesota
- Education: Read law

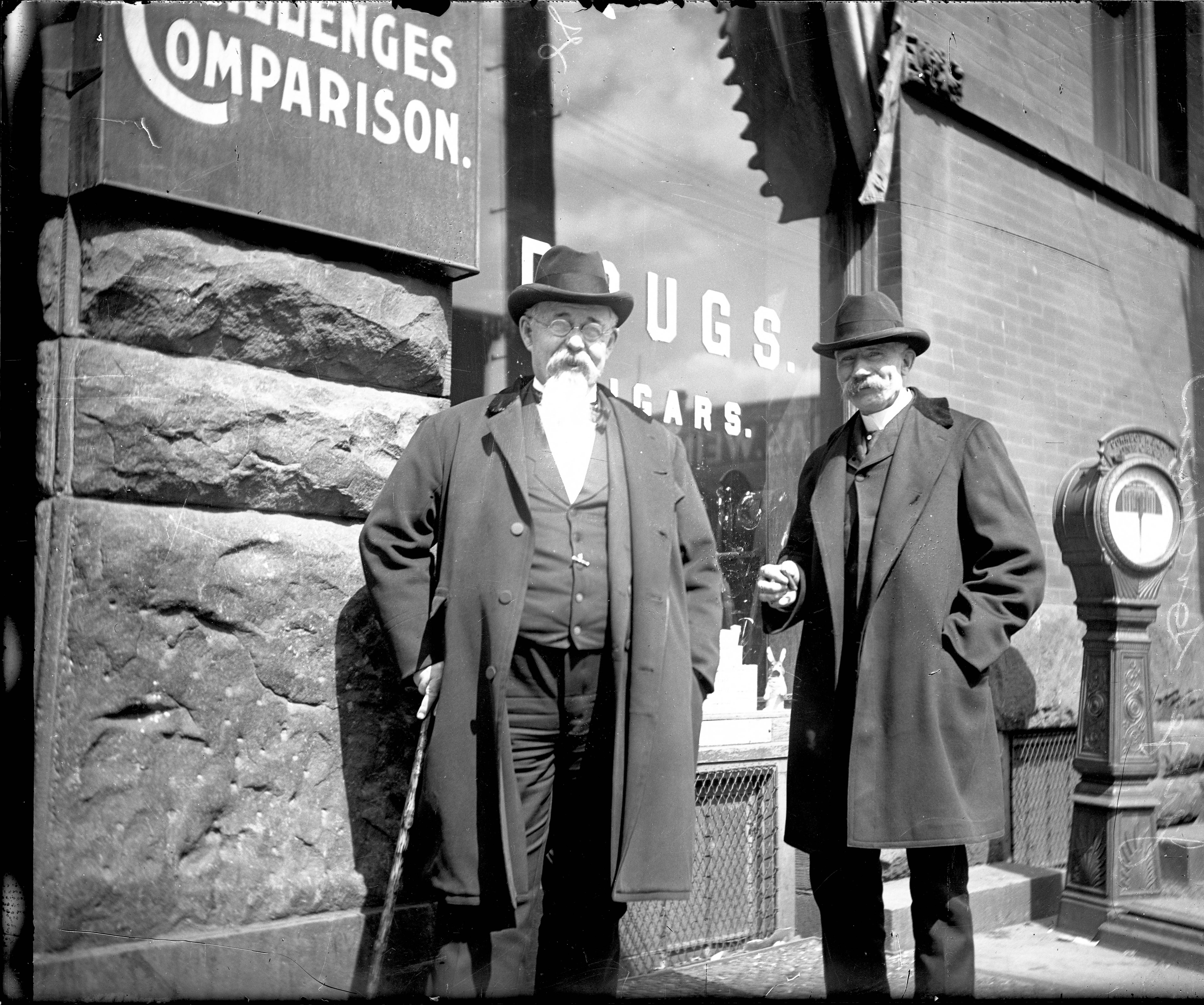
Judge William B. Lochren and friend in St. Paul

William Lochren (April 3, 1832 – January 27, 1912) was a United States district judge of the United States District Court for the District of Minnesota.

== Education and career ==
Born in County Tyrone, Ireland (now Northern Ireland), Lochren read law to enter the bar in 1856. He entered private practice in St. Anthony, Minnesota Territory (State of Minnesota from May 11, 1858) from 1856 to 1861. He served as an alderman and later as city attorney of St. Anthony. He was in the United States Army as a Lieutenant from 1861 to 1863, during the American Civil War. He resumed private practice in Minneapolis, Minnesota from 1864 to 1881. He was a member of the Minnesota Senate from 1869 to 1870. He was city attorney of Minneapolis from 1877 to 1878. He was a Judge of the Minnesota District Court for the Fourth Judicial District of Minnesota from 1881 to 1893. He was Commissioner of Pensions for the Bureau of Pensions in the United States Department of the Interior from 1893 to 1896.

== Federal judicial service ==
Lochren was nominated by President Grover Cleveland on May 15, 1896, to a seat on the United States District Court for the District of Minnesota vacated by Judge Rensselaer Nelson. He was confirmed by the United States Senate on May 18, 1896, and received his commission the same day. Lochren served in that capacity until his retirement on July 11, 1908.

== Death ==
Lochren died on January 27, 1912, in Minneapolis.

== Sources ==
Legal offices
Preceded by Rensselaer Nelson	Judge of the United States District Court for the District of Minnesota; 1896–1908	Succeeded by Milton D. Purdy
