= Gunnar Nordbye =

American judge

Senior Judge of the United States District Court for the District of Minnesota
- In office March 6, 1967 – November 5, 1977

Chief Judge of the United States District Court for the District of Minnesota
- In office 1948–1959
- Preceded by: Office established
- Succeeded by: Edward Devitt

Judge of the United States District Court for the District of Minnesota
- In office March 18, 1931 – March 6, 1967
- Appointed by: Herbert Hoover
- Preceded by: Seat established by 46 Stat. 431
- Succeeded by: Philip Neville

Personal details
- Born: Gunnar Hans Nordbye; February 4, 1888 Urskog, Norway
- Died: November 5, 1977 (aged 89)
- Education: University of Minnesota (LLB)

Gunnar Hans Nordbye (February 4, 1888 – November 5, 1977) was a United States district judge of the United States District Court for the District of Minnesota.

== Education and career ==
Nordbye was born at Urskog (spelled Aurskog since 1918) in Akershus, Norway. He was the son of Halvor Olsen Nordbye (1850–1894) and Anna Kristine Aarnæs (1856–1940). Nordbye received a Bachelor of Laws from the University of Minnesota Law School in 1912. He was in private practice in Minneapolis, Minnesota from 1912 to 1922. He was a Judge of the Municipal Court of Minneapolis from 1922 to 1925, and of the Fourth Judicial District Court of Minnesota from 1925 to 1931.

=== Federal judicial service ===
Nordbye received a recess appointment from President Herbert Hoover on March 18, 1931, to the United States District Court for the District of Minnesota, to a new seat authorized by 46 Stat. 431. He was nominated to the same position by President Hoover on December 16, 1931. He was confirmed by the United States Senate on February 3, 1932, and received his commission on February 10, 1932. Nordbye presided at the trial of Evyln Frechette, who was associated with John Dillinger. Other decisions included upholding the right to prevent airplane travel within the Superior National Forest, and deciding the ownership of William Clark's papers from the Lewis and Clark Expedition.

He served as Chief Judge from 1948 to 1959. He was a member of the Judicial Conference of the United States from 1958 to 1962. He assumed senior status on March 6, 1967. He was the last federal judge in active service to have been appointed by President Hoover. His service terminated on November 5, 1977, due to his death.

== See also ==
- List of United States federal judges by longevity of service

== Sources ==
Legal offices
Preceded by Seat established by 46 Stat. 431	Judge of the United States District Court for the District of Minnesota; 1931–1967	Succeeded by Philip Neville
Preceded by Office established	Chief Judge of the United States District Court for the District of Minnesota; 1948–1959	Succeeded by Edward Devitt
