= Donald Alsop =

American judge (born 1927)

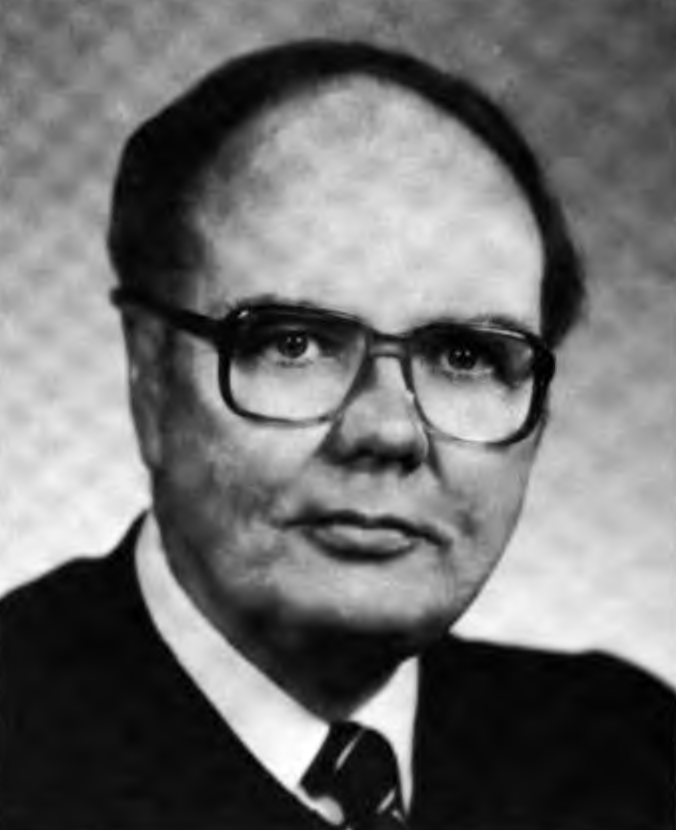

Senior Judge of the United States District Court for the District of Minnesota
- Incumbent
- Assumed office August 28, 1992

Chief Judge of the United States District Court for the District of Minnesota
- In office 1985–1992
- Preceded by: Miles Lord
- Succeeded by: Harry H. MacLaughlin

Judge of the United States District Court for the District of Minnesota
- In office December 20, 1974 – August 28, 1992
- Nominated by: Richard Nixon
- Appointed by: Gerald Ford
- Preceded by: Philip Neville
- Succeeded by: John R. Tunheim

Personal details
- Born: Donald Douglas Alsop; August 28, 1927 (age 99) Duluth, Minnesota, U.S.
- Education: University of Minnesota (BSL, LLB)

Donald Douglas Alsop (born August 28, 1927) is a senior United States district judge of the United States District Court for the District of Minnesota.

== Education and career ==
Alsop was born in Duluth, Minnesota, and served in the United States Army from 1945 to 1946. He received his Bachelor of Science in Law degree from the University of Minnesota in 1950 and his Bachelor of Laws from the University of Minnesota Law School in 1952. Following graduation, he clerked for Justice Thomas F. Gallagher of the Minnesota Supreme Court. He spent two years in private practice in Saint Paul, Minnesota, and then moved to New Ulm, Minnesota, where he practiced from 1954 to 1974.

=== Federal judicial service ===
On August 8, 1974, the day he announced his resignation, President Richard Nixon nominated Alsop for a seat on the United States District Court for the District of Minnesota vacated by Judge Philip Neville, who was assuming senior status. Alsop was confirmed by the United States Senate on December 18, 1974, and received his commission on December 20, 1974, from President Gerald Ford. He served as Chief Judge from 1985 to 1992, assuming senior status on August 28, 1992. As of January 2025, Alsop is no longer hearing cases.

== See also ==
- List of United States federal judges by longevity of service

== Sources ==
Legal offices
Preceded by Philip Neville	Judge of the United States District Court for the District of Minnesota; 1974–1992	Succeeded by John R. Tunheim
Preceded by Miles Lord	Chief Judge of the United States District Court for the District of Minnesota; 1985–1992	Succeeded by Harry H. MacLaughlin
