= Michael J. Davis =

American judge (born 1947)

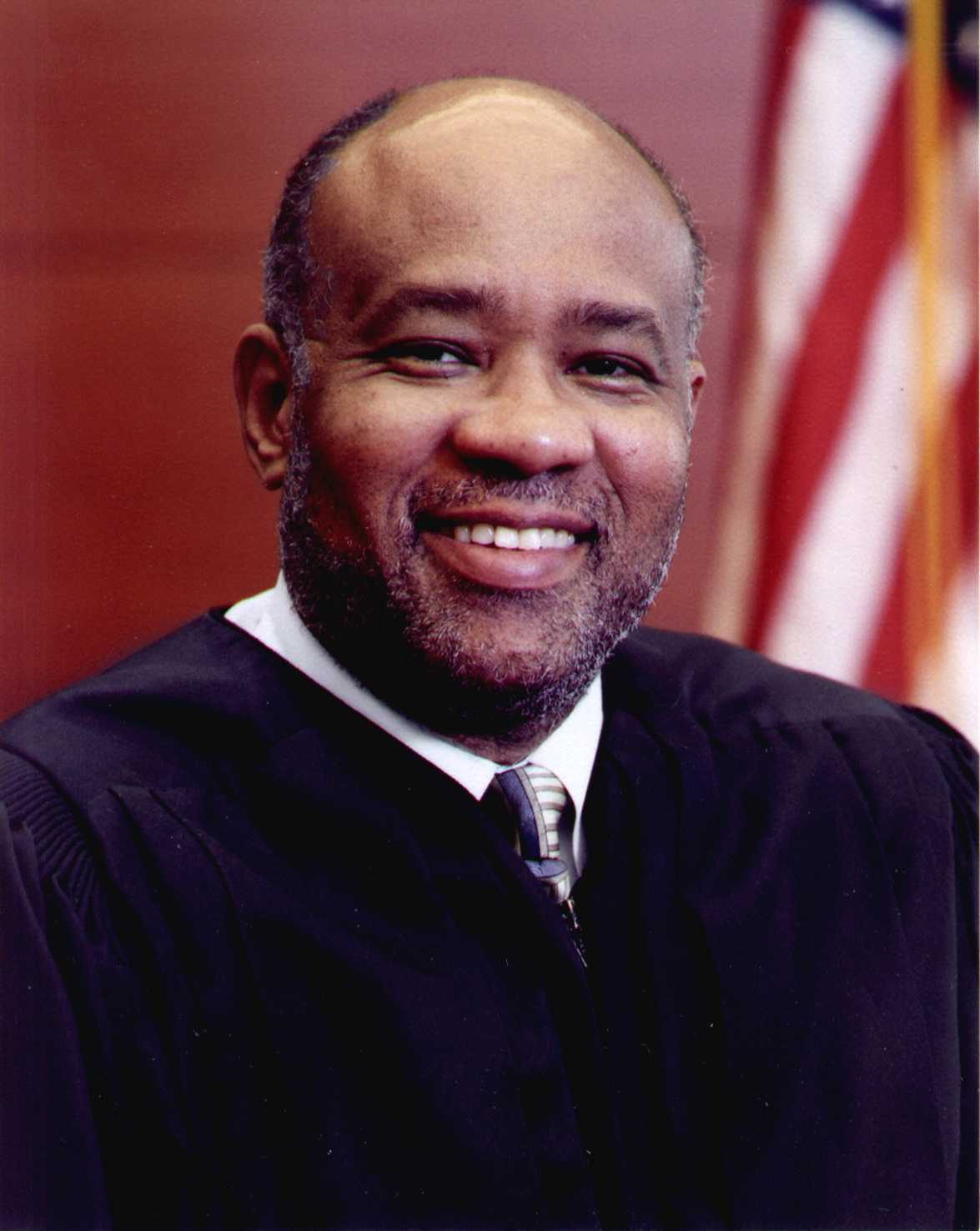

Senior Judge of the United States District Court for the District of Minnesota
- Incumbent
- Assumed office August 1, 2015

Chief Judge of the United States District Court for the District of Minnesota
- In office 2008–2015
- Preceded by: James M. Rosenbaum
- Succeeded by: John R. Tunheim

Judge of the United States Foreign Intelligence Surveillance Court
- In office May 19, 1999 – May 18, 2006
- Appointed by: William Rehnquist
- Preceded by: Earl H. Carroll
- Succeeded by: John D. Bates

Judge of the United States District Court for the District of Minnesota
- In office March 28, 1994 – August 1, 2015
- Appointed by: Bill Clinton
- Preceded by: Harry H. MacLaughlin
- Succeeded by: Wilhelmina Wright

Personal details
- Born: Michael James Davis; July 21, 1947 (age 78) Cincinnati, Ohio, U.S.
- Education: Macalester College (BA); University of Minnesota (JD)

Michael James Davis (born July 21, 1947) is a senior United States district judge of the United States District Court for the District of Minnesota.

== Early life, education, and career ==
Davis was born to Chester Davis and Doris Ruth Smith in Cincinnati, Ohio, and grew up in Aurora, Illinois. He is the great-great-grandson of Nathan Hughes, an escaped slave who joined the Union Army and fought with the 29th United States Colored Infantry Regiment, was wounded twice, and was the only African American member of the Grand Army of the Republic in Kendall County, Illinois. Davis graduated from East Aurora High School in 1965, where he was a star basketball player, wrote for the school newspaper, and served on the student council. He received a Bachelor of Arts degree from Macalester College in 1969 and a Juris Doctor from the University of Minnesota Law School in 1972.

Davis served as a law clerk for the Legal Rights Center from 1971 to 1973. He was an attorney in the Office of Legal Counsel for the Social Security Administration in Baltimore in 1973, and a criminal defense lawyer for the Neighborhood Justice Center in 1974. He returned to the Legal Rights Center as an attorney from 1975 to 1978. He then served as an attorney and commissioner at the Minneapolis Civil Rights Commission from 1977 to 1982 and as an attorney for the Hennepin County, Minnesota, Public Defender's Office from 1978 to 1983. Davis served as a judge in Hennepin County Municipal Court from 1983 to 1984 and a judge of the Fourth Judicial District of Minnesota (Hennepin County) from 1984 to 1994.

Davis served as an adjunct professor at the University of Minnesota Law School from 1982 to 2013 and at William Mitchell College of Law from 1977 to 1981. He was also an instructor at the Minnesota Institute of Legal Education in 1991 and 1992.

=== Federal judicial service ===
On November 19, 1993, President Bill Clinton nominated Davis to a seat on the United States District Court for the District of Minnesota vacated by Judge Harry H. MacLaughlin. He was confirmed by the Senate on March 25, 1994, and he received his commission on March 28, 1994. In May 1999, Chief Justice William Rehnquist appointed Davis to serve as a judge on the Foreign Intelligence Surveillance Court. His term on this court expired on May 18, 2006. He served as the chief judge of the district court from 2008 to 2015. He assumed senior status on August 1, 2015.

== See also ==
- List of African-American federal judges
- List of African-American jurists
- List of first minority male lawyers and judges in Minnesota

Legal offices
Preceded by Harry H. MacLaughlin	Judge of the United States District Court for the District of Minnesota; 1994–2015	Succeeded by Wilhelmina Wright
Preceded by Earl H. Carroll	Judge of the United States Foreign Intelligence Surveillance Court; 1999–2006	Succeeded by John D. Bates
Preceded by James M. Rosenbaum	Chief Judge of the United States District Court for the District of Minnesota; 2008–2015	Succeeded by John R. Tunheim
