= United States District Court for the District of Minnesota =

Federal district court whose jurisdiction is the state of Minnesota

Coordinates: 44°56′48″N 93°5′21″W

- (D. Minn.)
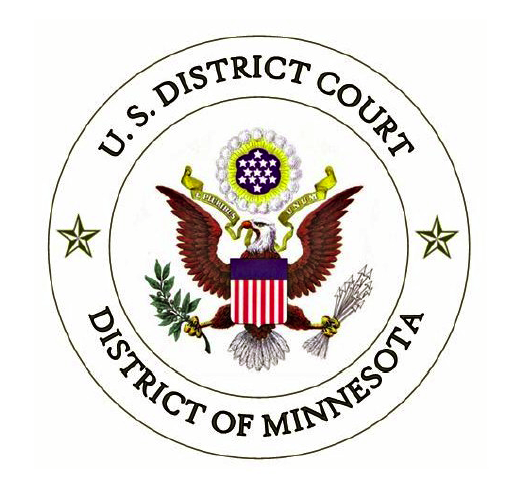

- Location: Minneapolis More locations: Saint Paul; Gerald W. Heaney Federal Building, United States Courthouse and Custom House (Duluth); Edward J. Devitt U.S. Courthouse and Federal Building (Fergus Falls); Winona; Mankato; Bemidji
- Appeals to: Eighth Circuit
- Established: May 11, 1858
- Judges: 7
- Chief Judge: Eric C. Tostrud

Officers of the court
- U.S. Attorney: Daniel N. Rosen
- U.S. Marshal: Eddie Frizell
- www.mnd.uscourts.gov

The United States District Court for the District of Minnesota (in case citations, D. Minn.) is the federal district court whose jurisdiction is the state of Minnesota. Its two primary courthouses are in Minneapolis and Saint Paul. Cases are also heard in the federal courthouses in Duluth and Fergus Falls.

Appeals from the District of Minnesota are taken to the United States Court of Appeals for the Eighth Circuit (except for patent claims and claims against the U.S. government under the Tucker Act, which are appealed to the Federal Circuit).

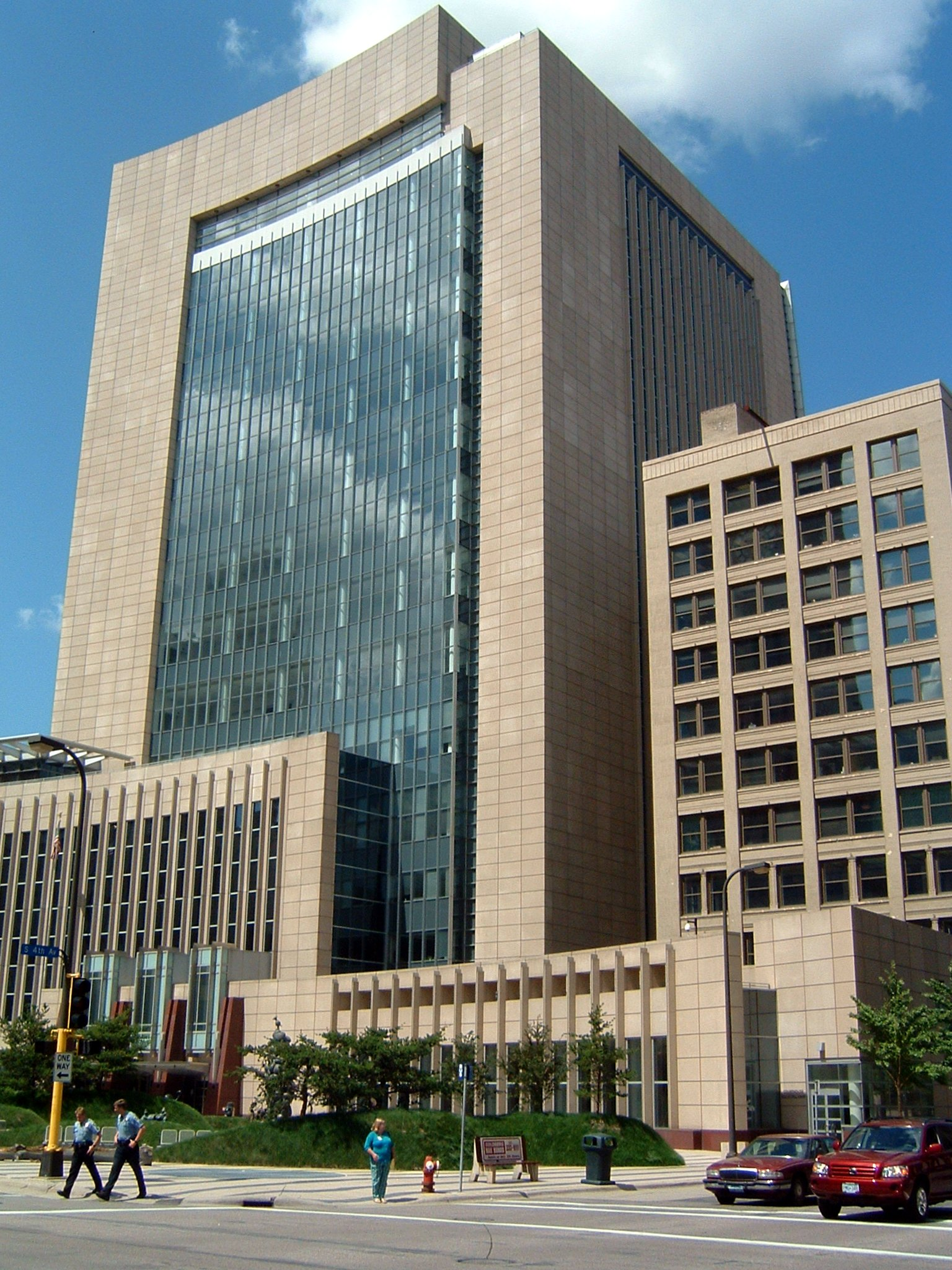
United States Courthouse, Minneapolis

== United States Attorney ==
The United States Attorney's Office for the District of Minnesota represents the United States in civil and criminal litigation in the court. One notable former U.S. attorney for the District was Cushman K. Davis, who later became governor of the state and was elected to the United States Senate.

As of October 10, 2025, the U.S. attorney is Daniel Rosen.

== Current judges ==
As of July 1, 2026:

#	Title	Judge	Duty station	Born	Term of service			Appointed by
#	Title	Judge	Duty station	Born	Active	Chief	Senior	Appointed by
36	Chief Judge	Eric C. Tostrud	Saint Paul	1965	2018–present	2026–present	—	Trump
37	District Judge	Nancy E. Brasel	Minneapolis	1969	2018–present	—	—	Trump
38	District Judge	Katherine M. Menendez	Minneapolis	1971	2021–present	—	—	Biden
39	District Judge	Jerry W. Blackwell	Saint Paul	1962	2022–present	—	—	Biden
40	District Judge	Jeffrey Bryan	Saint Paul	1976	2023–present	—	—	Biden
41	District Judge	Laura Provinzino	Saint Paul	1975	2024–present	—	—	Biden
42	District Judge	vacant	—	—	—	—	—	—
20	Senior Judge	Donald Alsop	inactive	1927	1974–1992	1985–1992	1992–present	Ford (Note: Judge Alsop was nominated by President Nixon but was officially appointed to the Court by (i.e., received his commission from) President Ford.)
24	Senior Judge	Paul A. Magnuson	Saint Paul	1937	1981–2002	1994–2001	2002–present	Reagan
28	Senior Judge	Michael J. Davis	Minneapolis	1947	1994–2015	2008–2015	2015–present	Clinton
29	Senior Judge	John R. Tunheim	Minneapolis	1953	1995–2023	2015–2022	2023–present	Clinton
30	Senior Judge	Ann D. Montgomery	Minneapolis	1949	1996–2016	—	2016–present	Clinton
31	Senior Judge	Donovan W. Frank	Saint Paul	1951	1998–2016	—	2016–present	Clinton
32	Senior Judge	Joan N. Ericksen	Minneapolis	1954	2002–2019	—	2019–present	G.W. Bush
33	Senior Judge	Patrick J. Schiltz	Minneapolis	1960	2006–2026	2022–2026	2026–present	G.W. Bush
34	Senior Judge	Susan Richard Nelson	Saint Paul	1952	2010–2021	—	2021–present	Obama
35	Senior Judge	Wilhelmina Wright	inactive	1964	2016–2024	—	2024–present	Obama

== Vacancies and pending nominations ==
Seat	Prior judge's duty station	Seat last held by	Vacancy reason	Date of vacancy	Nominee	Date of nomination
6	Minneapolis	Patrick J. Schiltz	Senior status	July 1, 2026	–	–

== Former judges ==
#	Judge	Born–died	Active service	Chief Judge	Senior status	Appointed by	Reason for termination
1	Rensselaer Nelson	1826–1904	1858–1896	—	—	Buchanan	retirement
2	William Lochren	1832–1912	1896–1908	—	—	Cleveland	retirement
3	Page Morris	1853–1924	1903–1923	—	1923–1924	T. Roosevelt	death
4	Milton D. Purdy	1866–1937	1908–1909 (Note: Recess appointment; the United States Senate later rejected the appointment.); 1909 (Note: Received a second recess appointment but resigned prior to consideration.)	—	—	T. Roosevelt; Taft	not confirmed resignation
5	Charles Andrew Willard	1857–1914	1909–1914	—	—	Taft	death
6	Wilbur F. Booth	1861–1944	1914–1925	—	—	Wilson	elevation
7	John F. McGee	1861–1925	1923–1925	—	—	Harding	death
8	William Alexander Cant	1863–1933	1923–1933 (Note: Recess appointment; formally nominated on December 15, 1923, confirmed by the Senate on January 15, 1924, and received commission the same day.)	—	—	Harding (Note: Judge Cant was given a recess appointment by President Harding.); Coolidge (Note: Judge Cant was nominated by President Harding but was appointed to the Court by (i.e., received his commission from) President Coolidge.)	death
9	Joseph W. Molyneaux	1859–1940	1925–1937	—	1937–1940	Coolidge	death
10	John B. Sanborn Jr.	1883–1964	1925–1932	—	—	Coolidge	elevation
11	Gunnar Nordbye	1888–1977	1931–1967 (Note: Recess appointment; formally nominated on December 16, 1931, confirmed by the Senate on February 3, 1932, and received commission on February 10, 1932.)	1948–1959	1967–1977	Hoover	death
12	Matthew M. Joyce	1877–1956	1932–1954	—	1954–1956	Hoover	death
13	Robert Cook Bell	1880–1964	1933–1961	—	1961–1964	F. Roosevelt	death
14	George F. Sullivan	1886–1944	1937–1944	—	—	F. Roosevelt	death
15	Dennis F. Donovan	1889–1974	1945–1965	—	1965–1974	Truman	death
16	Edward Devitt	1911–1992	1954–1981 (Note: Recess appointment; formally nominated on January 10, 1955, confirmed by the Senate on February 4, 1955, and received commission on February 7, 1955.)	1959–1981	1981–1992	Eisenhower	death
17	Earl R. Larson	1911–2001	1961–1977	—	1977–2001	Kennedy	death
18	Miles Lord	1919–2016	1966–1985	1981–1985	1985	L. Johnson	retirement
19	Philip Neville	1909–1974	1967–1974	—	—	L. Johnson	death
21	Harry H. MacLaughlin	1927–2005	1977–1992	1992	1992–2005	Carter	death
22	Diana E. Murphy	1934–2018	1980–1994	1992–1994	—	Carter	elevation
23	Robert G. Renner	1923–2005	1980–1992	—	1992–2005	Carter	death
25	James M. Rosenbaum	1944–present	1985–2009	2001–2008	2009–2010	Reagan	retirement
26	David S. Doty	1929–2026	1987–1998	—	1998–2026	Reagan	death
27	Richard H. Kyle	1937–2021	1992–2005	—	2005–2021	G.H.W. Bush	death

== Chief judges ==
Chief judges have administrative responsibilities with respect to their district court. Unlike the Supreme Court, where one justice is specifically nominated to be chief, the office of chief judge rotates among the district court judges. To be chief, a judge must have been in active service on the court for at least one year, be under the age of 65, and have not previously served as chief judge.

A vacancy is filled by the judge highest in seniority among the group of qualified judges. The chief judge serves for a term of seven years, or until age 70, whichever occurs first. The age restrictions are waived if no members of the court would otherwise be qualified for the position.

When the office was created in 1948, the chief judge was the longest-serving judge who had not elected to retire, on what has since 1958 been known as senior status, or declined to serve as chief judge. After August 6, 1959, judges could not become or remain chief after turning 70 years old. The current rules have been in operation since October 1, 1982.

== Succession of seats ==
Seat 1
Seat established on May 11, 1858 by 11 Stat. 285
R. Nelson	1858–1896
Lochren	1896–1908
Purdy	1908–1909
Purdy	1909
Willard	1909–1914
Booth	1914–1925
Sanborn, Jr.	1925–1932
Joyce	1932–1954
Devitt	1955–1981
Magnuson	1981–2002
Ericksen	2002–2019
Menendez	2021–present

Seat 2
Seat established on February 4, 1903 by 32 Stat. 795
Morris	1903–1923
Cant	1924–1933
Bell	1933–1961
Larson	1961–1977
MacLaughlin	1977–1992
Davis	1994–2015
Wright	2016–2024
Provinzino	2024–present

Seat 3
Seat established on September 14, 1922 by 42 Stat. 837 (temporary)
McGee	1923–1925
Seat abolished on February 15, 1925 (temporary judgeship expired)

Seat 4
Seat established on March 2, 1925 by 43 Stat. 1098 (temporary)
Seat made permanent on August 19, 1935 by 49 Stat. 659
Molyneaux	1925–1937
Sullivan	1937–1944
Donovan	1945–1965
Lord	1966–1985
Doty	1987–1998
Frank	1998–2016
Tostrud	2018–present

Seat 5
Seat established on May 28, 1930 by 46 Stat. 431
Nordbye	1932–1967
Neville	1967–1974
Alsop	1974–1992
Tunheim	1995–2023
Bryan	2023–present

Seat 6
Seat established on October 20, 1978 by 92 Stat. 1629
Renner	1980–1992
Kyle	1992–2005
Schiltz	2006–2026
vacant	2026–present

Seat 7
Seat established on October 20, 1978 by 92 Stat. 1629 (temporary)
Seat made permanent on July 10, 1984 by 98 Stat. 333
Murphy	1980–1994
Montgomery	1996–2016
Brasel	2018–present

Seat 8
Seat established on July 10, 1984 by 98 Stat. 333
Rosenbaum	1985–2009
S. Nelson	2010–2021
Blackwell	2022–present

== See also ==
- Courts of Minnesota
- List of current United States district judges
- List of United States federal courthouses in Minnesota
