= Earl R. Larson =

American judge

Senior Judge of the United States District Court for the District of Minnesota
- In office June 30, 1977 – October 31, 2001

Judge of the United States District Court for the District of Minnesota
- In office August 10, 1961 – June 30, 1977
- Appointed by: John F. Kennedy
- Preceded by: Robert C. Bell
- Succeeded by: Harry H. MacLaughlin

Personal details
- Born: Earl Richard Larson; December 18, 1911 Minneapolis, Minnesota, U.S.
- Died: October 31, 2001 (aged 89) Minneapolis, Minnesota, U.S.
- Education: University of Minnesota (B.A.); University of Minnesota Law School (J.D.)

Earl Richard Larson (December 18, 1911 – October 31, 2001) was a United States district judge of the United States District Court for the District of Minnesota.

== Education and career ==
Born in Minneapolis, Minnesota, Larson received a Bachelor of Arts degree from the University of Minnesota in 1932 and a Juris Doctor from the University of Minnesota Law School in 1935. He was an insurance adjuster for the Hardware Mutual Insurance Company from 1935 to 1937. He was in private practice in Minneapolis from 1937 to 1940. He was an Assistant United States Attorney of the District of Minnesota from 1940 to 1942. He was a trial attorney of the Office of Price Administration from 1942 to 1943. He was a trial attorney of the United States Department of Justice in 1943. He was in the United States Navy during World War II, from 1943 to 1946. He was in private practice in Minneapolis from 1946 to 1961.

== Federal judicial service ==
Larson was nominated by President John F. Kennedy on July 24, 1961, to a seat on the United States District Court for the District of Minnesota vacated by Judge Robert C. Bell. He was confirmed by the United States Senate on August 9, 1961, and received his commission on August 10, 1961. He assumed senior status on June 30, 1977. Larson served in that capacity until his death on October 31, 2001, in Minneapolis.

== Notable cases ==
Larson presided over Honeywell, Inc. v. Sperry Rand Corp. He also declared that the Rozelle rule was a violation of antitrust laws in Mackey v. National Football League on December 30, 1975.

== Sources ==
- Earl R. Larson Papers, Charles Babbage Institute University of Minnesota. Correspondence and newspaper clippings relating to the Honeywell v. Sperry Rand trial and recognition of John V. Atanasoff as the inventor of the electronic digital computer. Includes correspondence from historical researchers, awards committees, Atanasoff, and the patent counsel from Honeywell.

Legal offices
Preceded by Robert C. Bell	Judge of the United States District Court for the District of Minnesota; 1961–1977	Succeeded by Harry H. MacLaughlin
