= Charles Phineas Sherman =

American lawyer and academic

Charles Phineas Sherman, c. 1944

Charles Phineas Sherman (8 June 1874 – 20 July 1962) was a professor of Roman law and canon law at several colleges, including the Yale Law School, the College of William and Mary, and the Boston University School of Law. He wrote many articles and books, of which the best known is Roman Law in the Modern World (1917, 2nd ed. 1922, 3rd ed. 1933).

== Biography ==
Sherman was born into an old New England family in West Springfield, Massachusetts. The American Sherman family began with Philip Sherman, who emigrated from England in 1634 and became the Colony of Rhode Island's first Secretary. He studied at the public schools of West Springfield and graduated from high school there in 1891 as class valedictorian.

Sherman received his B.A. degree from Yale University in 1896 and entered Yale Law School the same year. The three-year Yale Law School undergraduate degree (an LL.B.) could be shortened to two at that time if a student already had earned a B.A., so he took this path and was granted his LL.B. in 1898. That same summer he took the Connecticut bar exam and was admitted to practice there. Since he was academically inclined he decided not to head into practice immediately. Instead he applied for Yale's D.C.L. (Doctor of Civil Law) program. Sherman completed the requirements in 1899, after only one year, including the writing of his dissertation on a Roman law topic.

== Career ==
=== Law Practice ===
After receiving his D.C.L. degree from Yale Sherman started practicing law in New Haven, Connecticut, In his memoir, Academic Adventures, Sherman claimed that he did not want his D.C.L. as a teaching credential. His goal rather was to go to Norfolk, Virginia to practice admiralty law, but in his memoir Sherman does not indicate why he failed to carry out that plan. Remaining in New Haven, acquired the French and the German translations of the Corpus Juris Civilis (in 1900, shortly after he earned his Doctor of Civil Law degree), regularly visited his old Roman law professor, Albert S. Wheeler, and, at the latter's suggestion, translated Bernard's La Premiere Annee de Droit Roman into English. Sherman also practiced law in New Haven for several years.

=== Teaching at Yale ===
In 1905, Yale Law School Dean Henry Wade Rogers asked Sherman to take over Professor Wheeler's courses when the latter died. This was the beginning of Sherman's twelve-year stint at Yale, the longest full-time appointment of his career. This was a particularly auspicious year for him in that it also was the year in which he married Miss Julia Rungee. In the next year, in addition to teaching three courses on Roman law, Sherman's translation of La Premiere Annee de Droit Roman was published, and he took on the position of Law Librarian at Yale. His translation (which he used for his Roman Law I course), was moderately well received by reviewers.

Sherman spent ten of these Yale years researching and writing what he called his magnum opus, Roman Law in the Modern World, which was published in 1917. In that same year, however, Sherman and other non-tenured Yale law School faculty members were forced out by the new dean, Thomas Swan.

=== Other Teaching and Activities ===
For many years afterwards, Sherman looked for a full-time teaching position. His failure to obtain a regular academic position may have resulted from the decidedly mixed reception by scholars of his Roman Law in the Modern World (RLMW). It is a three-volume work of great ambition. Volume one consists of a history of Roman law from its possible beginnings in Babylon, through the Republic and Empire, medieval times, and into the modern world. Volume two is a "manual," or exposition of the fundamental principles of Roman law, including their expressions in modern legal systems, while volume three is a bibliography of Roman and civil law by subject. RLMW was a huge undertaking that would have taxed the abilities of even the greatest Roman law scholar, and most critics decided Sherman had not been fully up to the task.

In 1920 Sherman was appointed as a full professor at the Boston University School of Law ). This was not a full-time teaching position, though, as he had already taken on two positions at a legal publishing company in Boston. However, owing to his workload, housing problems, and his mother's poor health, Sherman resigned his position at BU in 1922.

Three years later, Sherman began what would begin an association with the College of William and Mary that would continue for the rest of his life, teaching first in its history department, then, starting in 1927, at its School of Jurisprudence. Meanwhile, in 1926, at the age of fifty, he was appointed Professor of Canon Law and Modern Church Law at National University Law School in Washington, D.C. Sherman commuted between Washington, D.C. and Williamsburg, teaching in more than one department at each institution, and full-time at neither, until 1935 when he resigned from National and returned to Boston University. At National University, he was given an honorary LL.D. degree and taught several courses, including one on his favorite topic of Roman civilization in the modern world, and another on research in Greek or Hellenic Law. In 1933 Sherman published Roman Readings in Roman Law, the first in a planned two-volume set for use in Roman law courses.

In Washington, D.C., Sherman became friends with Professor Salvatore Riccobono. Sherman was among the group that organized Riccobono's presentations. Sherman also was a member of the council that organized the Riccobono Seminar of Roman Law in America after Riccobono returned to Italy. Sherman had two papers read at Riccobono Seminar meetings, one of which was introduced by his National University colleague Charles S. Lobingier. Sherman also made a contribution to a festschrift honoring Riccobono.

He was rehired as a lecturer in Roman law at Boston University Law School in 1935, teaching a course called Roman and Modern Law. In 1939, at the age of sixty-five, Sherman was elevated from the status of lecturer to full professor at BU. In 1942, his Roman Civilization in the Modern World was published. In 1945, when Sherman turned seventy-one, it seemed his career would be capped by an appointment to "a new professorial chair of Latin-American Commercial Law" at the Catholic University of America. However, Sherman never assumed that position. He retired from teaching in 1956 and died in 1962 at age 88 in Short Beach, Connecticut.
