= Judge Helmick =

Judge Helmick may refer to:

- Jeffrey J. Helmick (born 1960), judge of the United States District Court for the Northern District of Ohio
- Milton J. Helmick (1885–1954), judge of the United States Court for China
