= Huete, Spain =

- Municipality
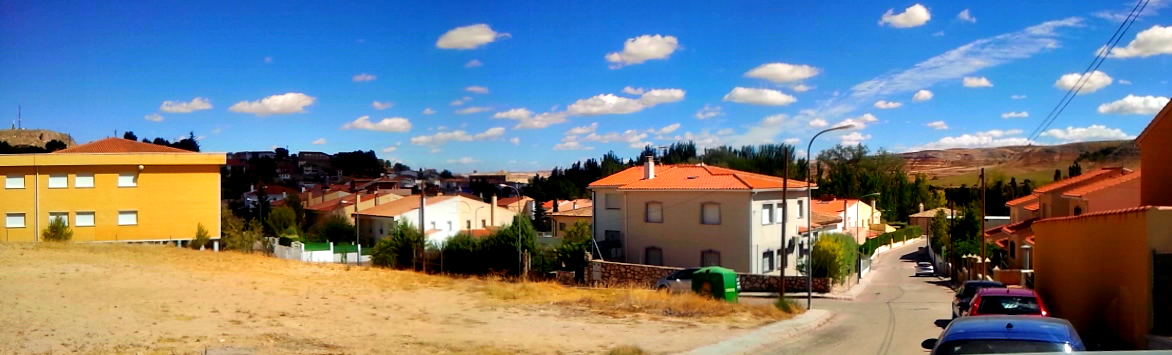
- Partial view of Huete town

- Coat of arms

- Location within Spain Location within Castilla-La Mancha
- Coordinates: 40°08′51″N 2°41′20″W
- Country: Spain
- Autonomous community: Castile-La Mancha
- Province: Cuenca

Population (2025-01-01)
  - Total: 1,814
- Time zone: UTC+1 (CET)
  - Summer (DST): UTC+2 (CEST)

Huete is a municipality in Cuenca, Castile-La Mancha, Spain. It has a population of 2,097.

During the Spanish Civil War, the municipality was the location of a small hospital where Annie Murray served as one of the nurses.

Historically, Huete was home to a prosperous Jewish community until the expulsion of the Jews.

== Notable people ==
- Alonso Díaz de Montalvo (1405–1499), Castilian jurist, who was based in and died in Huete
