= Siete Partidas =

Castilian medieval code of laws

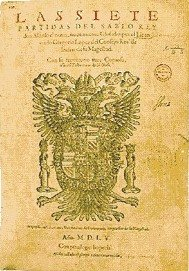
First page of a 1555 version of the Siete Partidas, as annotated by Gregorio López.

The Siete Partidas (Spanish pronunciation: [ˈsjete paɾˈtiðas], "Seven-Part Code") or simply Partidas, was a Castilian statutory code first compiled during the reign of Alfonso X of Castile (1252–1284), with the intent of establishing a uniform body of normative rules for the kingdom. The codified and compiled text was originally called the Libro de las Leyes (Old Spanish: Livro de las legies) (Book of Laws). It was not until the 14th century that it was given its present name, referring to the number of sections into which it is divided.

The Partidas had great significance in Latin America as well, where it was followed for centuries, up to the 19th century. Although the code concentrates on legislative issues, it has also been described as a "humanist encyclopedia," as it addresses philosophical, moral and theological topics as well, including the Greco-Roman and Judeo-Christian views of warfare.

== Background ==
=== Writing ===
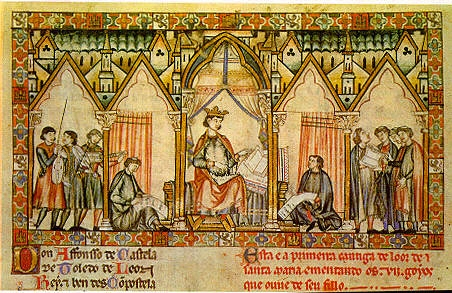
Alfonso X of Castile

According to one of the oldest versions of the Partidas, it was written between June 26, 1256 and August 28, 1265 by a commission of the principal Castilian jurists of the day, under the personal direction of Alfonso X. However, several other time periods have been proposed: 1254 to 1261; 1256 to 1263; and 1251 to 1265. In any event, the majority of historians believe that it was not completed until 1265.

The traditional view, shared by historian Francisco Martínez Marina and philologist Antonio Solalinde, is that the Siete Partidas codices were written by a commission of jurists (or members of the chancellery), and the involvement of Alfonso X was likely limited to setting out the goals of the text and the subjects to be addressed, as well as personally reviewing and amending the work of the commission. The commission is thought to have been made up of Master Jacobo, a legal scholar; Juan Alfonso, a civil law notary from León; a certain Master Roldán; and Fernando Martinez de Zamora (one of the first Castilian jurists). During the 18th century it was popularly believed that the Partidas was exclusively written by Alfonso X. This position was championed by Jesuit historian and writer, Andrés Marcos Burriel (Padre Burriel). Nevertheless, a significant debate has arisen concerning the authorship of works associated with Alfonso X. Other texts of the period 1254–1256, normally attributed to Alfonso X such as el Setenario, Fuero Real and the Espéculo display pronounced similarities to each other and to the Partidas. Despite scholarly efforts to determine the scope, relationships, and purpose of each of the texts, no consensus has been reached. The attribution debate was principally sparked by Alfonso García-Gallo's 1951–52 article, El "Libro de las Leyes" de Alfonso el Sabio. Del Espéculo a las Partidas (The "Book of Laws" of Alfonso the Wise. From the Espéculo to the Partidas). The questions raised in the article were expanded in other, later works. García-Gallo proposed that the Partidas was not the work of Alfonso X and that it was not finished during his reign, but rather was written in the 14th century, long after the learned king's death in 1284, and that it was a reworking of the Espéculo. He based his position on the fact that the first reliable references to the Partidas in other texts date from the beginning of the 14th century, and that the source materials for the Partidas were not known in the Iberian Peninsula until later than the date of composition claimed for the codex. In any case, Alfonso X continues to be nominally credited as the author of the Siete Partidas, or at least of the original version, whatever his role in its creation may have been, since the custom with great works of this type was to attribute them to the monarch or other ruler who commissioned them, even though it was known that they had no hand in the preparation (as was the case with the Code of Hammurabi, and Justinian's Corpus Juris Civilis).

=== Purpose ===
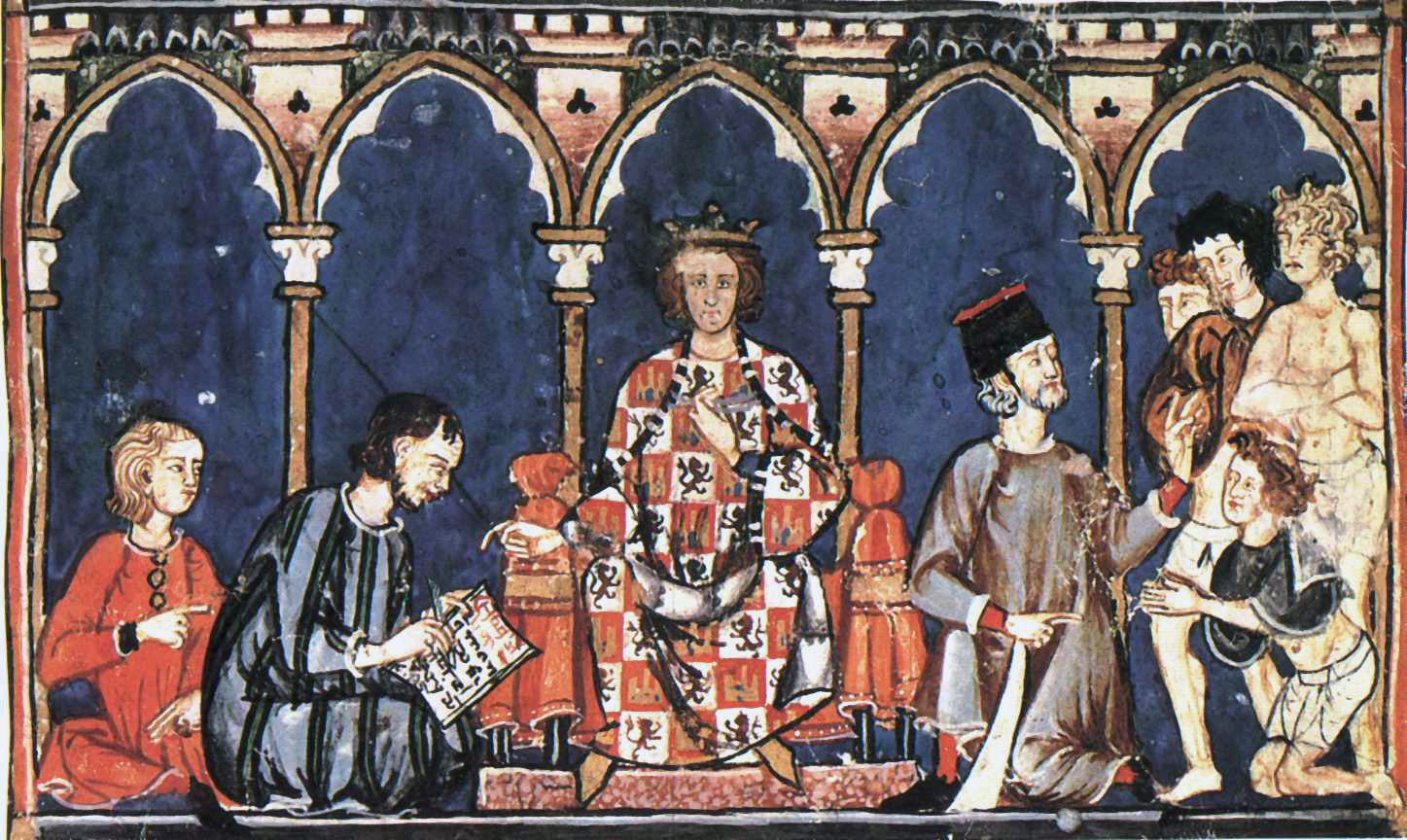
Alfonso X and his court

Despite its lengthy treatment of philosophical issues, some have maintained that the Partidas is intended as a legislative text rather than a work of legal theory—a view explicitly supported by the prologue, which indicates that it was created only so that it could be used to render legal judgments. Yet, García-Gallo has contended that, the prologue notwithstanding, the Siete Partidas was rarely put into practice until over a century after it was written. Resistance to the Partidas, especially among the Castilian nobility, led the Cortes (legislature) to enact the Ordinances of Zamora in 1274. These laws set qualifications for judges serving on the royal tribunal and restricted the application of the Partidas to the pleitos del rey, that is, legal cases under the exclusive jurisdiction of the king. All other matters (pleitos foreros) were governed by local laws or fueros. It was not until the “late enactment” by Alfonso XI in 1348 that the Partidas became widely applied. Furthermore, opposition to the Partidas can explain the differences among the similar texts listed above.

In any case, if the Partidas was written as a legal code, its ultimate objective has been a matter of dispute. Alfonso X, in what was called the fecho del imperio ("affair of the empire"), had aggressively pursued the crown of the Holy Roman Empire. His purpose for creating the Siete Partidas may have been to create a universally valid legal text for the entire Empire. In support of this argument, Aquilino Iglesias claimed in 1996 that the Partidas contained no references to Castilian territorial organization. Others, among them García-Gallo, argued by way of rebuttal that even though sometimes the role of the emperor appears higher than that of the monarchy, in other places the role of the monarchy appears higher than that of the emperor, and that furthermore the text was written in Spanish, rather than in Latin. However, an edition printed in Madrid in 1843, and available in facsimile from Google Books, appears to show that the Spanish is a translation of a Latin original.

What is certain is that the Partidas, including the prologue, makes no reference whatsoever to any intention to acquire the imperial crown. Moreover, some authors, such as Juan Escudero (a disciple of García-Gallo), have found references in the text to Castile's specific territorial organization, for example, villas.

It is therefore generally believed that with the creation of the Partidas, Alfonso X was trying to unify the kingdom's legal system, not by using the 'local' approach of his father Ferdinand III (that is, by granting the same fuero to various regions), but rather through a general code that applied to the entire country.

In this regard it has been argued that Alfonso X was moved by nascent national pride and a desire to establish Castilian as the common language of his kingdom when he commissioned and supported the work of the Castilian jurists and scholars in writing the Siete Partidas.

=== Enactment ===
It is not known whether the Siete Partidas was enacted by Alfonso X. Some authors believe so, and assert that the overthrow of the learned king by his son Sancho IV would have suspended its applicability. In a similar vein, Gaspar Melchor de Jovellanos claimed in 1797 that the descendants of Sancho IV suppressed the document of enactment because the provisions of the Partidas raised doubts about their rights to the crown, since the Partidas established the right of representation in the succession to the throne. Without taking away from the preceding argument, the Partidas undoubtedly acquired legal force under Alfonso XI, upon being incorporated in the orden de prelación by the first law of article 28 of the Ordenamiento de Alcalá of 1348. This fact is considered by those authors who do not believe that the Partidas was enacted by Alfonso X as a "late enactment."

== Sources ==
The Siete Partidas can be characterized as a text of civil law or ius commune (based on Justinian Roman law, canon law, and feudal laws), alongside influences from Islamic law. Maritime law and "native law," also have been asserted as being sources of the Partidas.

Its sources were diverse. Among the most important were the Corpus Iuris Civilis of Justinian; the works of the Roman glossators and commentators, for example Franciscus Accursius and Azzus; canon law texts like the Decrees of Gregory IX and the work of Saint Raimundo de Peñafort; the Islamic legal treatise Villiyet written in Islamic Spain; and some Castilian fueros and customs.

Other sources include philosophical works by Aristotle and Seneca; the Bible and texts by the Church Fathers; works by Isidore of Seville and Thomas Aquinas; the Libri Feudorum (compilation of Lombardic feudal law); the Roles D´Olerons (a collection of writings on commercial law); the Doctrinal de los juicios (Trial Manual) and the Flores de Derecho (Flowers of law) by Maestro Jacobo, who also worked on the Partidas; and the Margarita de los pleytos by Fernando Martínez de Zamora.

== Structure and content ==
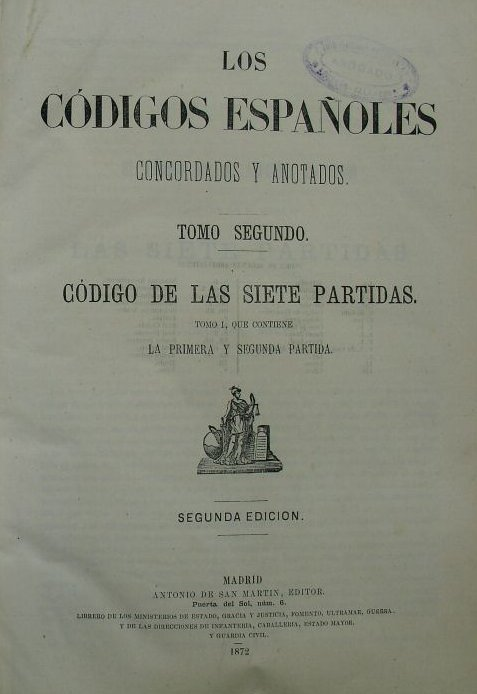
Codice of the Siete Partidas, in "Los Códigos Españoles Concordados y Anotados" (1872)

The Partidas brings together all the jurisprudence of the era into a single, unified vision, and for that reason has been regarded as a summa de derecho (the highest and binding authority for deciding legal issues). It deals, among other things, with constitutional law, civil law, commercial law, criminal law, and trial law (both civil and criminal).

It was written in an elegant, literary Spanish style, inspired by a theological vision of the world. It contains a Prologue, which lays out the object of the work, and seven parts, or books, called partidas, each of which starts with a letter of the name of the learned king, thus forming an acrostic of the name 'Alfonso':

1. A seruicio de Dios... (For the service of God...)
2. La ffe cathólica... (The Catholic faith...)
3. Fizo Nuestro Sennor Dios... (Our Lord God did...)
4. Onras sennaladas... (Special rites...)
5. Nascen entre los ommmes... (Among men there arise...)
6. Sesudamente dixeron... (The ancient wise men sagely said...)
7. Oluidança et atreuimiento... (Forgetfulness and boldness...)

Each partida is divided into articles (182 in total), and these are composed of laws (2802 in all).

Its provisions are normally accompanied by references to authors and texts, allegories and examples, and, especially, a reasoned explanation of their origins and background—etymological, religious, philosophical and historical—for they are not meant to be merely prescriptive laws.

The contradictions that exist between the various provisions were the result of the way the task of composition was organized, whereby each partida was written by a different person.

Part I, Title I, Law xi: What the Law-Maker Should Be The law-maker should love God and keep Him before his eyes when he makes the laws, in order that they may be just and perfect. He should moreover love justice and the common benefit of all. He should be learned, in order to know how to distinguish right from wrong, and he should not be ashamed to change and amend his laws, whenever he thinks or a reason given him, that he should do so; for it is especially just that he who has to set others right and correct them should know how to do this in his own case, whenever he is wrong.

Part I, Title I, Law xx: For What Reason Men Cannot Escape the Operation of the Laws by Saying That They Were Ignorant of Them No one can escape the penalties of the laws by saying that he did not know of them, for, since men have to be preserved by them by receiving as well as doing justice, it is reasonable that they should know them and read them, either by acquiring their meaning from those who have read them, or by hearing them discussed in some other way without reading; for men have excuses for many things which happen in this world; but they cannot excuse themselves from sending others in their places to assert their rights in court; and if they should have no one to send, they should communicate with some of their friends who may happen to be in the place where they are to be judged by the laws, that they too may represent them and argue their cases for them, and they must give them authority to do so. And since by themselves, or by their representatives, or by means of letters, they are able to defend themselves, they cannot avoid doing so by saying that they did not know the laws, and if they should offer such a reason as this it will not avail them.

Part II, Title I, Law X: What the Word Tyrant Means, and How a Tyrant Makes Use of this Power in a Kingdom, After He Has Obtained Possession of it. A tyrant means a lord who has obtained possession of some kingdom, or country, by force, fraud, or treason. Persons of this kind are of such a character, that after they have obtained thorough control of a country, they prefer to act for their own advantage, although it may result I injury to the country, rather than for the common benefit of all, because they always live in the expectation of losing it. And in order that they might execute their desires more freely, the ancient sages declared that they always employed their power against the people, by means of three kinds of artifice. The first is, that persons of this kind always exert themselves to keep those under their dominion ignorant and timid, because, when they are such, they will not dare to rise up against them, oppose their wishes. The second is, that they promote disaffection among the people so that they do not trust one another, for while they live in such discord, they will not dare to utter any speech against the king, fearing that neither faith nor secrecy will be kept among them. The third is, that they endeavor to make them poor, and employ them in such great labors that they can never finish them; for the reason that they may always have so much to consider in their own misfortunes, that they will never have the heart to think of committing any act against the government of the tyrant.

In addition to all this, tyrants always endeavor to despoil the powerful, and put the wise to death; always forbid brotherhoods and associations in their dominions; and constantly manage to be informed of what is said or done in the country, trusting more for counsel and protection to strangers, because they serve them voluntarily, than to natives who have to perform service through compulsion. We also decree that although a person may have obtained the sovereignty of a kingdom by any of the methods mentioned in the preceding law, if he should make a bad use of his power in any of the ways above stated in this law, people can denounce him as a tyrant, and his government which was lawful, will become wrongful; as Aristotle stated in the book which treats of the government of cities and kingdoms.

Part II, Title X, I: What the Word People Means Some persons think that by the word people is meant the common people, as, for instance, mechanics, and laborers, but this is not the case, for, in ancient times, in Babylon, Troy, and Rome, which were famous cities, all these matters were regulated in a reasonable way, and a suitable name was given to everything. There the union of all men together, those of superior, middle, and inferior rank, was called the people; for all are necessary, and none can be excepted, for the reason that they are obliged to assist one another in order to live properly and be protected and supported.

Part II, Title XXI, Law iv: Knights Should Possess Four Chief Virtues Excellent qualities which men naturally possess are called good habits, and are styled virtutes in Latin, and of these four are superior, namely, prudence, fortitude, temperance, and justice. Although every man should desire to be good, and endeavor to acquire these virtues, not only the preachers whom we have mentioned, but others as well, whose duty it is to maintain the country by means of their labors and exertions; among them, there are none, to whom this is more becoming than to the defenders, for the reason that it is their duty to protect the Church, the monarchs, and all others. Prudence will enable them to do this to advantage, and without injury; fortitude will cause them to be firm and not irresolute in what they do; moderation will induce them to perform their duties as they should, and not be guilty of excess; and justice will enable them to act according to the right. For this reason the ancients, by way of commemoration, caused arms of four kinds to be made for the knights; first, such as they clothe themselves with, and wear; second, those with which they gird themselves; third, those which they bear in front of them; fourth, those with which they strike; And although these are of many forms, nevertheless they are designed for two purposes; blows, which are called weapons. And because the defenders did not ordinarily possess these weapons, and, even though they had them, might not always be able to carry them, the ancients deemed it proper to contrive one which should be emblematic of all these, and this is the sword. For, as the arms which men put on for the purpose of defense indicate prudence, which is a virtue that protects them from all evils which can come upon them through their own fault; so the hilt of a sword which a man holds in his grasp, is also suggestive of this, for as long as he holds it, he has the power to raise or lower it, or strike with it, or abandon it; and as the arms which a man carries before him to defend himself, denote fortitude, which is a virtue that renders him steadfast in the midst of dangers which may come upon him, so all the fortitude of the sword lies in its pommel, for to it is attached the hilt, the guard, and the blade.

And, as the armor which a man girds on is intermediate between that with which he is clothed and the weapons with which he strikes, and thus resembles the virtue of moderation between things which are excessive and those which are less than they should be; with great similarity to this, the guard is placed between the handle and the blade of the sword. Moreover, as the arms which a man holds ready to strike with, whenever it is advisable, symbolize justice, which includes right and equality; so the blade of the sword which is straight and sharp, and cuts the same with both edges, represents the same thing. On account of all this the ancients ordained that noble defenders should always wear the sword, and that by means of it and with no other weapon they should receive the honor of knighthood, in order that they might always be reminded of these four virtues which they should possess: for, without them, they could not perfectly maintain the condition of defense for which they were appointed.

Part II, Title XXI, Law xiii: What Duties a Squire Should Perform Before He Receives the Order of Knighthood Cleanliness makes all things that are visible look well, just as elegance makes them appear graceful, each in its own way. Hence the ancients deemed it proper that knights should be created without any suspicion of blemish. For, as they should practice purity among themselves and it ought to be manifested in their good qualities and their habits, as we have stated; they should also display it externally in their clothing, and in the arms which they bear. For although their calling is rude and bloody, as it is concerned with wounds and death; nevertheless, their minds should not refuse to be naturally pleased with things which are beautiful and elegant, and especially when they wear them; for the reason that, on the one hand, they confer joy and comfort upon them, and, on the other, it induces them to perform intrepid deeds of arms, since that they are aware that they will be better known on this account, and that all persons will pay more attention to what they do; therefore cleanliness and elegance are not impediments to the bravery and ferocity which they ought to possess. Moreover, as we stated above, their external appearance indicates the condition of their minds, and, for this reason, the ancients directed that a squire should be of noble descent; that the day before he received the order of knighthood he should keep watch; and that on the day when he received it, in the afternoon, the squires should bathe him and wash his head along with his hands, and place him in the best bed that they could find, and then it was the duty of the knights to dress him in the best garments they had.

After they had cleansed his body in this way they were required to do as much for his soul by conduction him to the church, where he was obliged to endure hardship by watching and praying to God to pardon his sins, and guide him to act for the best in the order which he desired to receive, so that he could defend his religion, and do other things which were proper; and that he might protect and defend him from danger and adversity and whatever opposition he might encounter. He should bear in mind that God has authority over all things, and can manifest it whoever He desires to do so, and that this is especially the case with regard to deeds of arms; for in his hand are life and death, the power to give and to take, and he can cause the weak to be strong and the strong to be weak. When he has made this prayer, he must remain upon his knees as long as he can endure it, while all the others stand; for the vigils of knights were not instituted as games, or for any other purpose but that they and the others present may ask God to preserve, direct, and assist them, as men who are entering upon a career of death.

Part II, Title XXXI, Law ii: In What Place a School Should be Established, and How the Masters and Pupils Should Be Secure The town where it is desired to establish a school should have pure air and beautiful environs, in order that the masters who teach the sciences and the pupils who learn them, may live there in health, and rest and take pleasure in the evening, when their eyes have become weary with study. It should, moreover, be well provided with bread and wine, and good lodging houses, in which the pupils can live and pass their time without great expense. We declare that the citizens of the town where a school is situated, should carefully protect its masters and pupils and everything belonging to them, and that no one should arrest or hinder the messengers who come to them from their homes, on account of any debt that their parents, or any others of the countries where they are natives, may owe. We also declare that no wrong, dishonor, or violence should be shown them on account of any enmity or grudge which any man may entertain against the said pupils or their messengers, and all their property, be secure and free from molestation, while going to the schools, while there, and while returning to their homes, and we grant them this security in all the towns of our dominions.

Whoever violates this law, by taking their property by force, or by robbing them, shall pay four times the value of what is stolen, and where anyone wounds, dishonors, or kills any of them, he shall be punished without mercy, as a man who violates our truce, and the security which we have granted. And if the judges before whom a complaint of this kind is made are negligent in rendering the parties justice, as above stated, they shall pay the amount aforesaid out of their own property, and be dismissed from office as infamous persons. Where they act in a malicious manner toward the pupils, refusing to punish those who dishonored, wounded, or killed them, then the officers who acted in this manner shall themselves be punished according to the will of the king.

Part IV, Title I, Law x: Parents Cannot Betroth Their Daughters When They Are Not Present and Do Not Give Their Consent Where one man promises another to take one of his daughters as his wife, such words do not constitute a betrothal, because none of the daughters was present, and does not specifically consent to take the party as her husband, any more than he does her as his wife, for just as matrimony cannot be contracted by one person alone, neither can a betrothal be so contracted. In matrimony it is necessary for those who desire to contract it to be present and each one must accept the other, or there must be two others who do this by their direction, and if a father swears or promises a party who has sworn to him that he would take that one of his daughters which he would give him as his wife, and afterwards none of his daughters gives her consent, or is willing to accept the party to whom the father had sworn, he cannot, for this reason, compel any of them absolutely to do this, although he has a right to reprove them, in order to obtain their permission. If, however, the party to whom the father wishes to marry one of his daughters was a desirable person, and the daughter would do well to marry him, although he cannot compel her to perform what he promised, he can disinherit her, for the reason that she was not grateful to her father for the benefit he desired to confer upon her, and caused him sorrow through her disobedience. And this is understood if thereafter she should marry another against her father's will or commit carnal sin.

Part IV, Title XI, Law vii: Donations and Dowries, Made in Consideration of Marriage, Should Remain Under Control of the Husband, to Be Kept and Taken Care Of. A husband should place his wife in possession of the gift which he makes her, and the wife should do the same thing with her husband with regard to the dowry she gives; and, although each of them places the other in possession of their respective gifts, nevertheless, the husband should be the master and have control of all the property aforesaid, and be entitled to collect the income of the whole, including what the wife gives, as well as that given by him, for the purpose of supporting himself, his wife, and his family, and to preserve, defend, and protect the marriage well and faithfully. Still, the husband has no right to sell, dispose of, or waste the donation which he gave his wife, or the dowry which he receives from her, as long as the marriage lasts, except where such a gift has been appraised. This should be observed for the following reason, namely: in order that if a separation takes place, the property of each of the parties may be returned to them, free and without encumbrance, to dispose of at their pleasure, or, where the marriage is dissolved by death, that it may descend intact to their heirs.

Part IV, Title XI, Law xvii: Concerning Separate Property Belonging to the Wife, Which is Not Given as Dowry, and Which is Called in Latin, Paraphernalia. (return) All property and possessions, whether personal or real, which women keep separately for themselves, and do not enter in the account of a dowry, are called in Greek parapherna, and this derived its name from para, which means, in Greek, the same as near, and pherna which takes the place of dowry, in Greek, the same as things which are joined to, or connected with a dowry. All the articles called, in Greek, parapherna, when they are given by a wife to her husband with the intention that he shall have control of them as long as the marriage lasts, he has the right to keep, just as those which are given him by way of dowry. Where they are not specifically given to the husband, and it was not the intention of the wife that he should have control of them, she always remains their owner; and the same rule applies whenever any doubt arises whether she gave them to her husband or not.

All these things called parapherna, have the same privilege as a dowry has, for just as a husband is responsible to his wife to the full amount of his property, if he disposes of or wastes her dowry, he is also responsible for the parapherna, no matter what may happen to it. And although an obligation of this kind may not be contracted by words, it is understood to be created solely by the act itself. For as soon as the husband receives the dowry and the other property called parapherna, all his property, for this reason, becomes bound to his wife, not only what he has at the time, but also what he may acquire subsequently.

Part V, Title VIII, Law xxvi: Inn-Keepers, and Keepers of Lodging Houses, and Sailors Are Obliged to Pay the Owners for Property of Which They Have Charge When It Is Lost in Their House or Their Ships. It happens frequently that knights, merchants, or other men who travel, are compelled to lodge in the houses of inn-keepers and in taverns, and have to entrust their property to the charge of those whom they find there, confiding in them without any witnesses, and without any other security; and also those who are forced to travel by sea place their property in ships in the same way, by trusting the sailors; and for the reason that it frequently happens that among these two kinds of men, some are found who are very dishonest, and are guilty of great injury and wickedness towards those who confide in them; hence it is but proper that their criminality should be restrained by punishment. Wherefore, we decree that all property deposited by travelers by land or water in the houses of inn-keepers or tavern-keepers, or in ships which knowledge of the owners of the said inns, taverns, or ships, or parties representing them, shall be taken care of, so that it will not be lost or diminished in value; and if it should be lost through the negligence of said parties, or through any fraud committed by them, or by any fault of theirs, or if anyone accompanying said travelers should steal it, they shall then be obliged to pay the value of said loss or deterioration; for it is but just that since travelers entrust their persons and property to them that they should protect them faithfully, with all their power, so that they may not suffer either wrong or injury.

What we mention in this law is understood to apply to inn-keepers and tavern-keepers, and the owners of ships, who are accustomed to entertain men publicly, receiving from them pay or hire for their service. We decree that the aforesaid persons shall be bound to protect them in the same way if they entertain them through affection, and do not charge them anything, except in certain cases. First, where the party tells his guest before he receives him, that he will take good care of his property, but is not willing to bind himself to pay for it if it is lost. Second, where, before he receives him, he shows him a chest or a house and says to him, "If you desire to remain here, put your property in this house or in this chest, here is the key of it, and take good care of your property." Third, where the property is lost through some unavoidable accident, as, for instance, by fire or inundation; or where a house is demolished; or where it is lost through a ship being damaged; or through the violence of public enemies; for where property is lost in any of the ways aforesaid, which did not happen through the fraud or fault of the parties, they will not then be bound to pay for the same.

== Editions ==
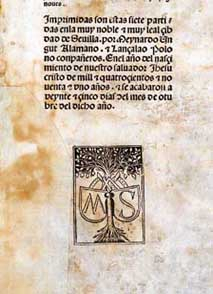
Seal of the printer of the 1491 Seville edition.

In addition to the diversity of manuscripts and other copies produced after the appearance of the printing press in the 15th century, there existed three main editions of the Siete Partidas:

- An edition annotated by Alonso Díaz de Montalvo, published in Seville, 1491. There were eight copies by 1528.
- An edition annotated by Gregorio López, published in Salamanca, 1555. There were 15 copies by 1855. This edition received legitimacy by royal decree on September 7, 1555, and was the version most used in Hispanic America.
- An edition from the Real Academia de la Historia, published in 1807. Declared official by sovereign dictate on March 8, 1818.
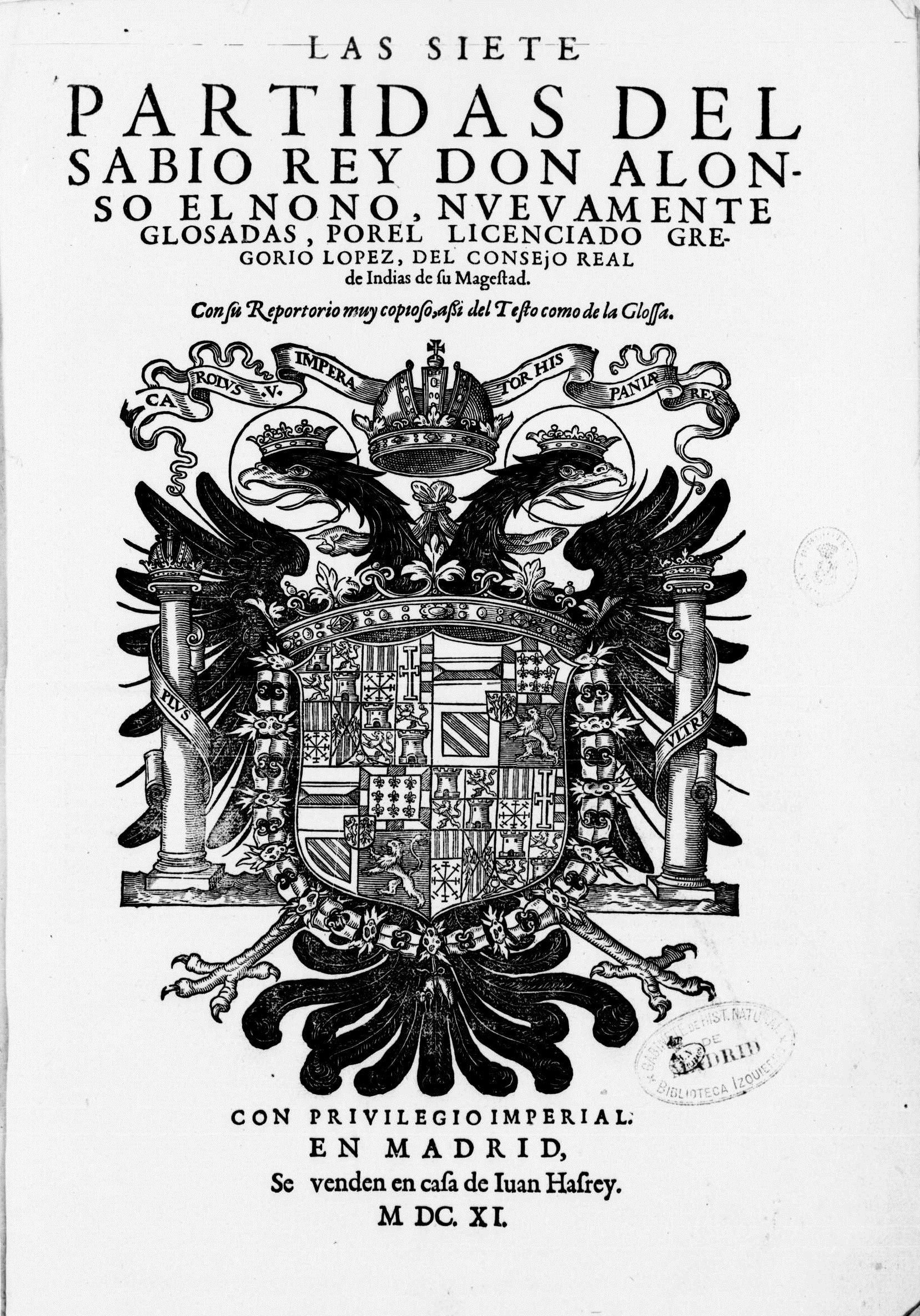
Siete partidas, annotated by Gregorio López de Tovar, Madrid 1611

== Influence and importance ==
The Siete Partidas, as the centerpiece of legislative activity under Alfonso X, represents the high point of the acceptance of common law (from Roman and canonical traditions) in Spain. Moreover, it constitutes one of the most important judicial works of the Middle Ages.

The artfulness of the presentation of the material and the beauty of its language garnered considerable prestige for the work both inside and outside of Castile, and the work was known throughout the Christian West. It served as a text of study in many universities of the day, and it was translated into several languages, including Catalan, Portuguese, Galician and English.

Likewise, it was one of the most important legal texts for the governing of Castile (given that it regulated so many matters) and, later, the Spanish Empire. From the beginnings of European expansion into the New World, it was introduced to Spanish America along with Castilian law, and to Brazil, with Portuguese law.

Its contents encompass almost all aspects of life, from political law to civil to criminal, continuing on to family law, succession, legal matters, and legal proceedings. All that is missing are matters considered in subsequent law, such as post-tridentine canon law, the Leyes de Toro, dealing with hereditary debt, and matters specific to Spanish America, governed by indigenous law.

The Siete Partidas was in force in Latin America until the modern codification movement (1822–1916); until the beginning of the 19th century, they were even in effect in the parts of the United States, such as Louisiana, that had previously belonged to the Spanish empire and used civil law. (Note: Burns, discusses the impact of the Partidas in Louisiana (pp.xix-xxi), Texas (pp.xxi-xxix), and California (xxiv-xxvi). He also discusses the Partidas effect on mining law and water law in the Southwestern United states (xxvi-xxix).) Furthermore, they served as the legal foundation for the formation of the governing juntas that were established in both Spain and Spanish America after the imprisonment of King Fernando VII during the Peninsular War. Finally, although the codification movement put an end to the direct application of the Partidas, the legal standards they contain have not disappeared. Most of the principles of the Partidas can be found in the laws of Latin American countries, especially in their civil codes.

== English translation ==
A translation of the Siete Partidas into English by Samuel Parsons Scott was published in 1931 and reprinted with editorial changes in 2001. Scott's translation was well received by reviewers.

== See also ==
- Fuero Juzgo
- Fuero Real
- Literature of Alfonso X

== Bibliography ==
=== Primary sources ===
- Nova, Lex (1989). Las Siete Partidas. Madrid: Lex Nova. ISBN 84-7557-283-9.
- Las Siete Partidas.- BOE, 1999 - ISBN 84-340-0223-X (edición facisimilar de la edición de 1555, con glosas de Gregorio López).
- Scott, Samuel Parsons (trans.); Charles Summer Lobingier (1991) [1931]. Siete Partidas (Spanish Law Code). Ann Arbor, Michigan: University Microfilms International.

=== Secondary sources ===
- Arias Bonet, Juan Antonio: "La primera Partida y el problema de sus diferentes versiones a la luz del manuscrito del British Museum", en Alfonso X el Sabio: Primera Partida según el manuscrito Add. 20.787 del British Museum.- Valladolid: Universidad de Valladolid.- 1975. p. XLVII-CIII. ISBN 84-600-6717-3
- Arias Bonet, Juan Antonio: "Sobre presuntas fuentes de las Partidas", en Revista de la Facultad de Derecho de la Universidad Complutense.- Número extraordinario: julio de 1985.- p. 11-23.
- Bravo Lira, Bernardino: "Vigencia de las Siete Partidas en Chile", en Derecho común y derecho propio en el Nuevo Mundo.- Santiago de Chile: Jurídica de Chile.- 1989. p. 89-142.
- Craddock, Jerry: "La cronología de las obras legislativas de Alfonso X el Sabio", en Anuario de Historia del Derecho español, Nº 51: 1981.- p. 365-418.
- Craddock, Jerry: "El Setenario: última e inconclusa refundición alfonsina de la primera Partida", en Anuario de Historia del Derecho español, Nº 56: 1986.- p. 441-466.
- Eyzaguirre, Jaime (1992). Historia del Derecho. Santiago de Chile: Universitaria, S.A. OCLC 6447558.
- García-Gallo, Alfonso: "El "Libro de las Leyes" de Alfonso el Sabio. Del espéculo a las Partidas", en Anuario de Historia del Derecho español, Nº 21-22: 1951-1952.- p. 345-528.
- García-Gallo, Alfonso: "Los enigmas de las Partidas", en VII Centenario de las Partidas del Rey Sabio, Instituto de España.- 1963.
- García-Gallo, Alfonso: "Nuevas observaciones sobre la obra legislativa de Alfonso X", en Anuario de Historia del Derecho español, Nº 46: 1976. p. 509-570.
- García-Gallo, Alfonso: "La obra legislativa de Alfonso X. Hechos e hipótesis", en Anuario de Historia del Derecho español, Nº 54: 1984.
- Iglesia Ferreiros, Aquilino: "Alfonso X el Sabio y su obra legislativa", en Anuario de Historia del Derecho español, Nº 50: 1980.- p. 531-561.
- Iglesia Ferreiros, Aquilino: "Cuestiones Alfonsinas", en Anuario de Historia del Derecho español, Nº 55: 1985.- p. 95-150.
- Livacíc Gazzano, Ernesto (1982). Las Siete Partidas. Santiago de Chile: Andrés Bello.
- Martínez Marina, Francisco (1834). Ensayo histórico-crítico sobre la legislación y principales cuerpos legales de los reinos de León y Castilla especialmente sobre el código de las Siete Partidas de D. Alfonso el Sabio. Madrid: Imprenta de D. E. Aguado.
- Solalinde, Antonio: "Intervención de Alfonso X en la redacción de sus obras", en Revista de Filología Española, Nº 2: 1915.- p. 283-288.
- Tejedo-Herrero, Fernando (2010). Diccionario de las Siete Partidas (1491). New York: Hispanic Seminary of Medieval Studies.
