= Lebbeus R. Wilfley =

American lawyer and judge (1866–1926)

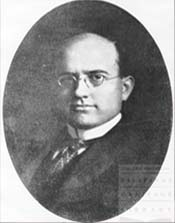
- Lebbeus Wilfley, Judge of the United States Court for China

Attorney General of the Philippines
- In office 1901–1906
- Preceded by: Position established
- Succeeded by: Gregorio S. Araneta

Judge of the United States Court for China
- In office 1906–1908
- Preceded by: Position established
- Succeeded by: Rufus Thayer

Personal details
- Born: March 30, 1866 Mexico, Missouri, U.S.
- Died: May 26, 1926 (aged 60) Greenwich, Connecticut, U.S.
- Education: Central Methodist University (A.M.); Yale Law School (LL.B.)

Lebbeus Redman Wilfley (/ˈwɪlfliː/ March 30, 1866 – May 26, 1926) was an American attorney who served as Attorney General of the Philippines and as a judge of the United States Court for China. He is also known for his investigation into the Torreón massacre.

== Early life and career ==
Wilfley was born in Mexico, Audrain County, Missouri, the son of James Franklin Wilfley. He received an A.M. from Central Methodist University in Fayette, Missouri in 1889 and a LL.B. from Yale Law School in 1892. He entered private practice in St. Louis, Missouri, where he was joined in 1899 by his brother, future Senator Xenophon P. Wilfley.

In 1901, William Howard Taft, then Governor-General of the Philippines, appointed Wilfley as the first Attorney General of the Philippines. Wilfley served in that position from 1901 to 1906. Wilfley was the only non-Filipino to hold the position.

== Federal judicial service ==
In 1906, the U.S. congress established a special court for the "District of China" the United States Court for China, based in the Shanghai International Settlement which had extraterritorial power to try United States Citizens in China. Wilfley was appointed the first judge of this court by President Theodore Roosevelt in July 1906. With no obligation to follow the strictures of the constitution or local law, there were many complaints by American expatriates, especially one by Lorrin Andrews, former Attorney General of the Territory of Hawaii, who charged that Wilfley had voided a will by a person leaving some of his money to the Catholic Church because of his prejudice against it. In the pages of the news magazine The Cosmopolitan, Wilfley was called The Most Hated Man in China. His offense was that with the assistance of the United States Attorney he closed down the houses of prostitution in Shanghai known as "The American Houses." "Seventeen of them [American prostitutes] departed that evening on one steamship, and a dozen on another craft. In two weeks half a hundred women had voluntarily enrolled themselves as former residents of Shanghai...It was an exodus, a hegira...If there is an American girl in any disorderly house, Wilfley and his district attorney do not know of it."

On February 20, 1908, United States Representative George E. Waldo introduced articles of impeachment against Wilfley and the resolution was referred to the House Judiciary Committee. Leaving the court in chaos, Wilfley traveled halfway around the world to attend the hearings in Washington, D.C.

Theodore Roosevelt came to Wilfley's defense. He wrote a letter to his Secretary of State, Elihu Root, where he stated..."It is clear that Judge Wilfley has been attacked not because he has done evil, but because he has done good.....If the attack were to succeed the beneficiaries would be every keeper of a house of prostitution, every swindling lawyer, every man who lives by blackmailing corruption in the cities of the Far East.” The minority leader in the House of Representatives, John Sharp Williams, a Democrat, called for an investigation of Roosevelt, asserting that he was interfering with the Congressional investigation. "If these charges against the President [that he attempted to influence the impeachment proceedings] prove true… I shall introduce a resolution calling for a thorough investigation [for purposes of impeachment] of this intrusion of the President of the United States on the rights of members of this House."

On May 8, 1908, the House Committee on the Judiciary submitted a report, H.R. Rep. No. 60-1626, to the House recommending against impeachment.

In November 1908, Henry David O'Shea, the editor of the China Gazette in Shanghai was prosecuted in the British Supreme Court for China and Corea for criminal libel against Wilfley relating to an article published in the China Gazette in August 1908 concerning the charges against Wilfley and Wilfley's testimony to Congress. O'Shea was convicted by a jury and sentenced to 2 months imprisonment.

Despite O'Shea's conviction, the situation was so poisoned, Wilfley resigned at the end of 1908 and returned to the U.S. for good. He was succeeded as judge by Rufus Thayer.

== Later life and Torreón massacre ==
Wilfley thereafter practiced in Missouri and New York. He also maintained a law office in Mexico City. In 1909, Clark University conferred an LL.D upon him.

In 1911, the Chinese government hired Wilfley to investigate the Torreón massacre, in which over 300 Chinese were killed. As a result of Wilfley's investigations, the Mexican government under President Francisco Madero agreed to pay an indemnity of 3,100,000 pesos to the Republic of China for the massacre. Due to the turmoil of the Mexican Revolution, however, the indemnity was postponed and ultimately never paid.

On January 27, 1917, Wilfley married Belle L. Zabriskie (née Loader), widow of entrepreneur Alanzo M. Zabriskie. Wilfley was practicing in New York at the time.

== Death ==
He died in Greenwich, Connecticut at the age of 60.
