= United States Court for China =

1906–1943 United States district court

- Defunct
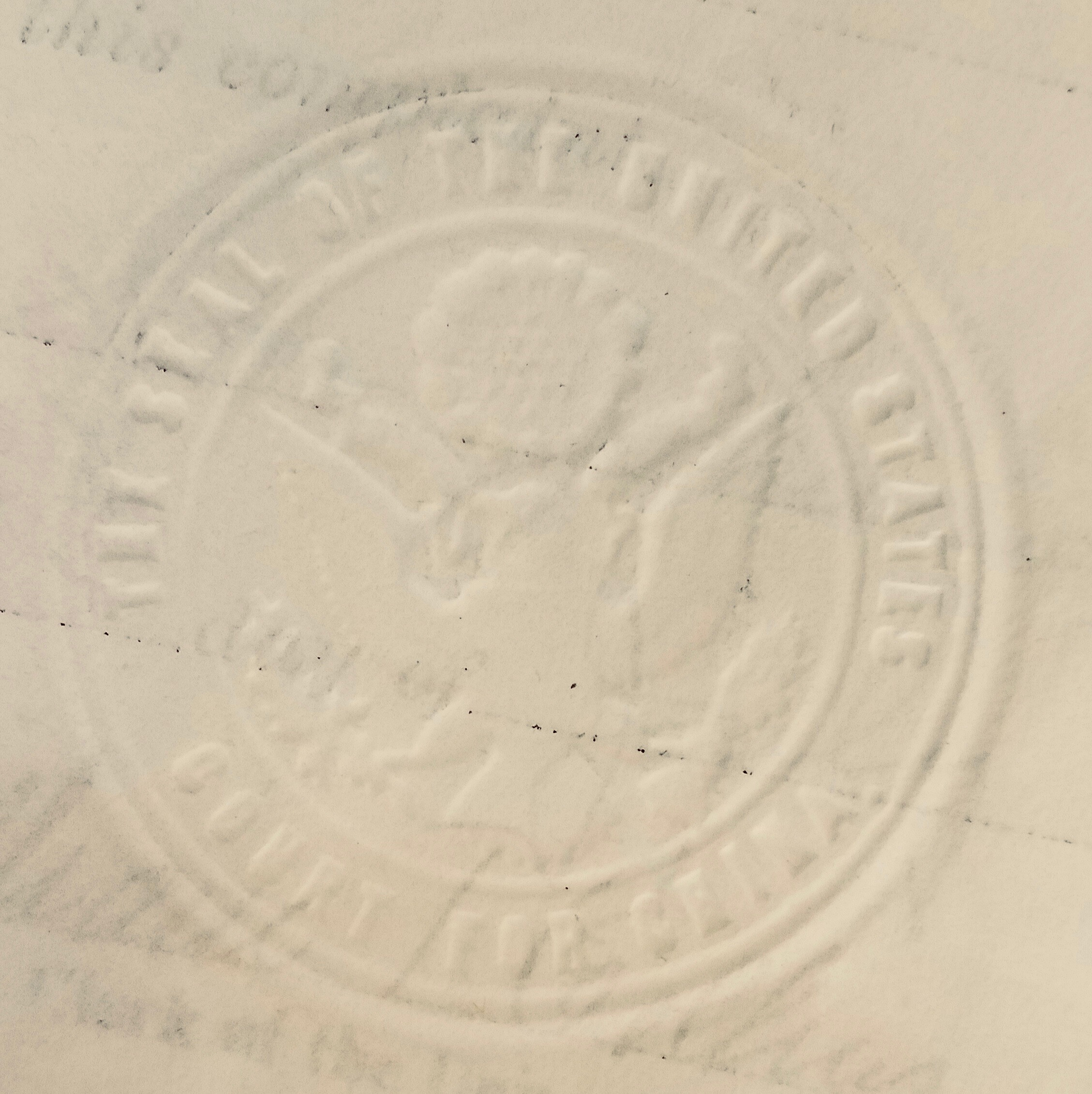
- Location: Shanghai International Settlement
- Appeals to: Ninth Circuit
- Established: June 30, 1906
- Abolished: May 20, 1943

United States Court for China
- Traditional Chinese: 美國中國事務法院
- Simplified Chinese: 美国中国事务法院
Transcriptions
Standard Mandarin
- Hanyu Pinyin: Měiguó Zhōngguó Shìwù Fǎyuàn

Alternative Chinese name
- Traditional Chinese: 上海美國法院
- Simplified Chinese: 上海美国法院
- Literal meaning: Shanghai American Court
Transcriptions
Standard Mandarin
- Hanyu Pinyin: Shànghǎi Měiguó Fǎyuàn

The United States Court for China was a United States district court from 1906 to 1943 that had extraterritorial jurisdiction over U.S. citizens in China. Located in Shanghai International Settlement, the court had jurisdiction in civil and criminal matters, with appeals taken to the United States Court of Appeals for the Ninth Circuit in San Francisco.

== Consular courts prior to establishment of court ==
Extraterritorial jurisdiction in China was first granted to the United States by the Treaty of Wanghia upon ratification in 1845, followed by the Treaty of Tientsin ratified in 1860.

Under the treaties, cases against U.S. citizens were tried in U.S. consular courts, while cases against Chinese nationals were tried in Chinese courts. Consuls had jurisdiction in the following matters:

- criminal cases where the punishment for the offense charged did not exceed a $100 fine or 60 days' imprisonment, from which there was no appeal;
- criminal cases where the punishment for the offense charged did not exceed a $500 fine or 90 days' imprisonment, from which an appeal was available to the commissioner of the United States in China; and
- civil cases, in which those for damages not exceeding $500 were generally not subject to appeal.

The commissioner had jurisdiction to hear all cases, and could prescribe rules of civil and criminal procedure for the consuls to follow.

== Establishment of court ==
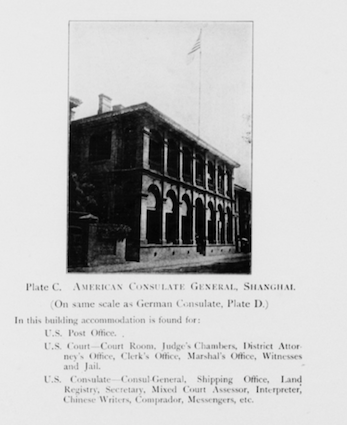
American Consulate General and U.S. Court for China, Shanghai 1907

The Court was established in 1906 by the Act Creating a United States Court for China. The Court was similar in structure to the British Supreme Court for China and Japan that had been established in Shanghai in 1865.

The Court was originally headquartered in the American Consulate General building on Huangpu Road in the Shanghai International Settlement, with additional sessions held at least annually in the Chinese cities of Guangzhou, Tianjin, and Hankou. The court moved with the U.S. Consulate when the consulate was moved from its previous premises in the years 1911, 1930 and 1936.

The Court only had one full-time judge, and those on trial sometimes had to wait months for proceedings. In the 1930s, the law was amended to allow for the appointment of special judges, allowing trials to proceed in the judge's absence. Appeals were allowed to the United States Court of Appeals for the Ninth Circuit.

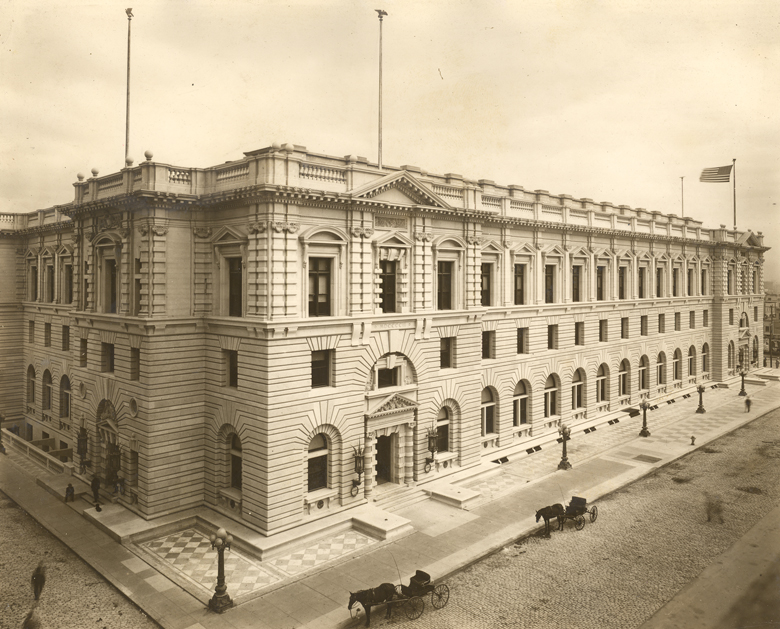
The 9th Circuit Court of Appeals in San Francisco which heard appeals from the US Court for China

The U.S. consular courts in China retained limited jurisdiction, including civil cases where property involved in the controversy did not exceed $500 and criminal cases where the punishment did not exceed $100 in fines or 60 days' imprisonment. The Court exercised appellate jurisdiction over them, as well as, until 1910, when Japan annexed Korea, the U.S. consular courts in Korea.

== Jurisprudence ==
The Court's jurisdiction was given an expansive interpretation:

- while the treaty strictly covered only U.S. citizens, the Court assumed jurisdiction over U.S. non-citizen nationals who originated from "possessions" (i.e., colonies), such as the Philippines and Guam.
- even where the State Department discriminated against Chinese Americans living abroad in China, the court held that "an American citizen in China, whether residing temporarily or permanently, remains as much under the jurisdiction of his government, its laws and its institutions as if he were residing at home".
- it enforced consular title deeds where U.S. citizens held land in trust for Chinese beneficiaries.
- in divorce and annulment cases, only the plaintiff had to be an American resident in China: there were no residency or nationality requirements for defendants.

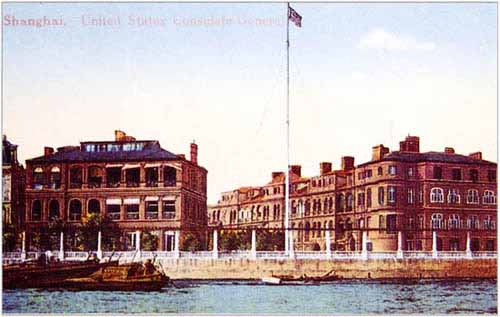
The United States Consulate on the banks of the Huangpu River. The court was in the building on the left from 1911 to 1930

The sources of law drawn upon by the Court were quite varied:

- Because the Court was based outside of the United States, the United States Constitution did not apply; there was neither the right to a jury trial nor to constitutional due process.
- It was also provided that, where "the laws of the United States ... are deficient in the provisions necessary to give jurisdiction or to furnish suitable remedies, the common law and the law as established by the decisions of the courts of the United States shall be applied."
- The municipal regulations of the Shanghai International Settlement also were recognized and given effect.
- Traditional Chinese law, as well as local "compradore" or "Chinese custom", were applied by the Court in some cases.

The question as to what constituted "common law" led to severe difficulties, because U.S. federal law did not cover many criminal offenses or civil matters (which were normally provided for by U.S. state law). The Ninth Circuit provided a solution to this conundrum in the case of Biddle v. United States, where it was held that the laws of the Territory of Alaska or the District of Columbia were federal law and could be applied by the Court. (Note: Judge Charles S. Lobingier gave detailed evidence on the workings of, and application of law by, the Court and extraterritoriality in China to the House Committee on Foreign Affairs in 1917.) As a result, Judge Lobingier later would hold that "there can be no half way adoption of that doctrine; it includes all such laws or none. It cannot logically be restricted to any particular class of acts. It is just as applicable to civil laws as to criminal; just as 'necessary' in respect to corporations as to procedure."

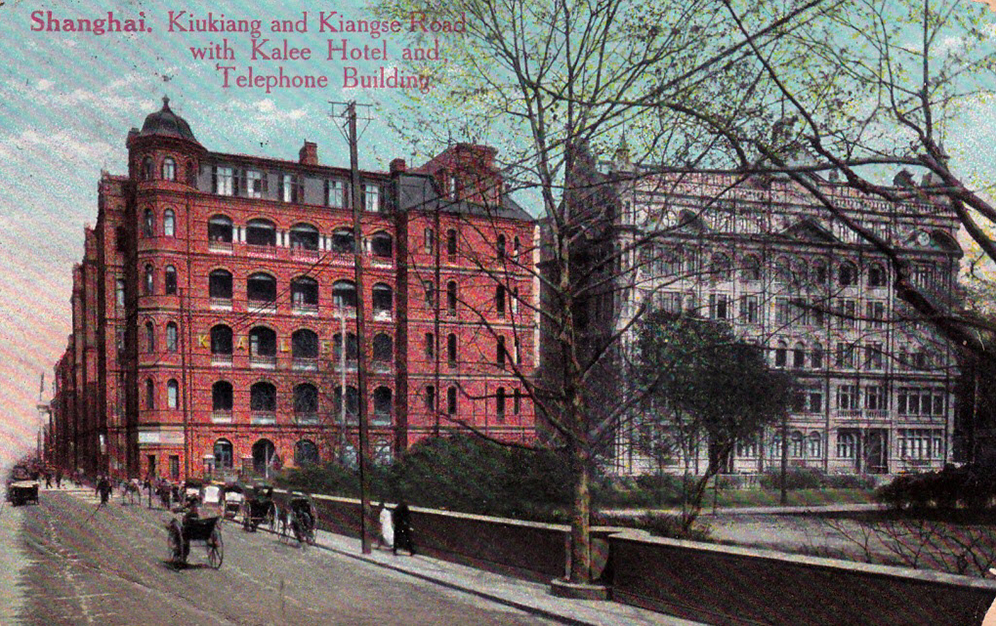
The former Kalee Hotel; the Court was located on the 2nd floor from 1930 to 1936

The Court prescribed its own rules for procedures to be followed. This was in contrast to the situation in the States, where civil procedure in actions at law (i.e., most lawsuits for monetary damages) in U.S. federal courts was normally provided for by state law, by virtue of the Conformity Act of 1872, until the promulgation of the Federal Rules of Civil Procedure in 1938.

The United States Congress also passed several statutes conferring specific powers on the court:

- An Act to Regulate the Practice of Pharmacy and the Sale of Poison in the Consular Districts of the United States in China, Pub. L. 63–262, 38 Stat. 817, enacted March 3, 1915
- China Trade Act, 1922, Pub. L. 67–312, 42 Stat. 849, enacted September 19, 1922, as amended by Pub. L. 68–484, 43 Stat. 995, enacted February 26, 1925

== Court seal ==
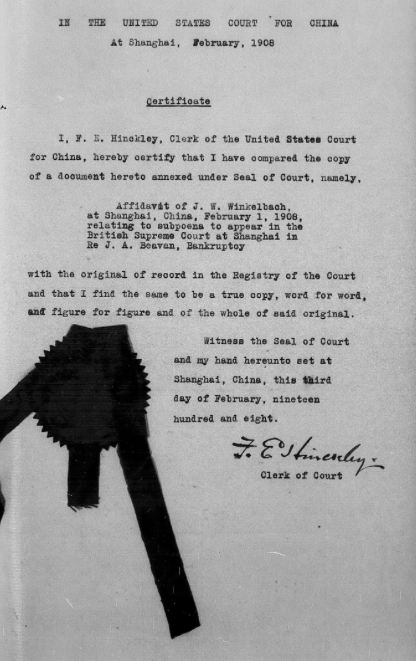
Certificate of Clerk of US Court for China bearing the seal of the court

The act establishing the court provided: "The seal of the United States Court for China shall be the arms of the United States, engraved on a circular piece of steel of the size of a half dollar, with these words in the margin 'The Seal of the United States Court for China'". The seal was to be used to seal all writs, processes and other documents issued by the court.

== Imprisonment ==
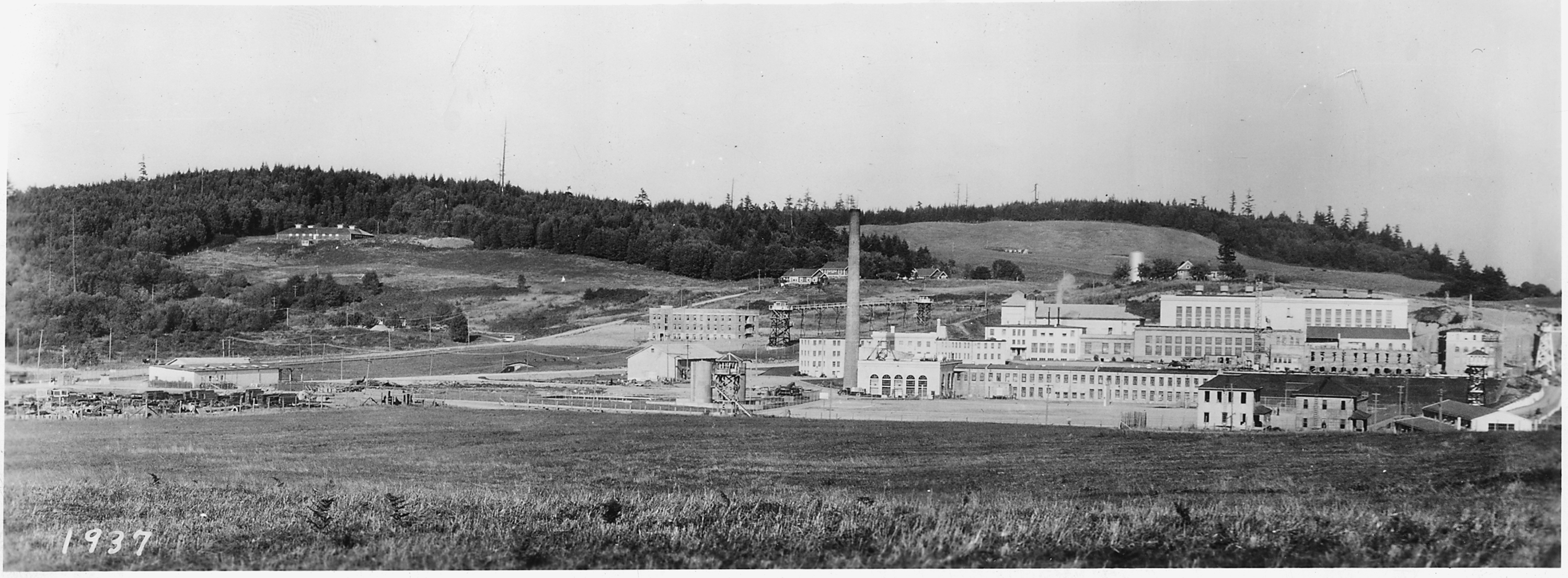
McNeil Island Penitentiary in 1937

People who received relatively short sentences for criminal offences were either imprisoned in the Consular Gaol in the consulate or in either Ward Road Gaol or Amoy Road Gaol, both run by the Shanghai Municipal Council. Those serving longer sentences were sent to Bilibid Prison in the Philippines and later from the 1920s were generally sent to the federal penitentiary at McNeil Island in Washington State to serve their sentence.

== Abolition ==
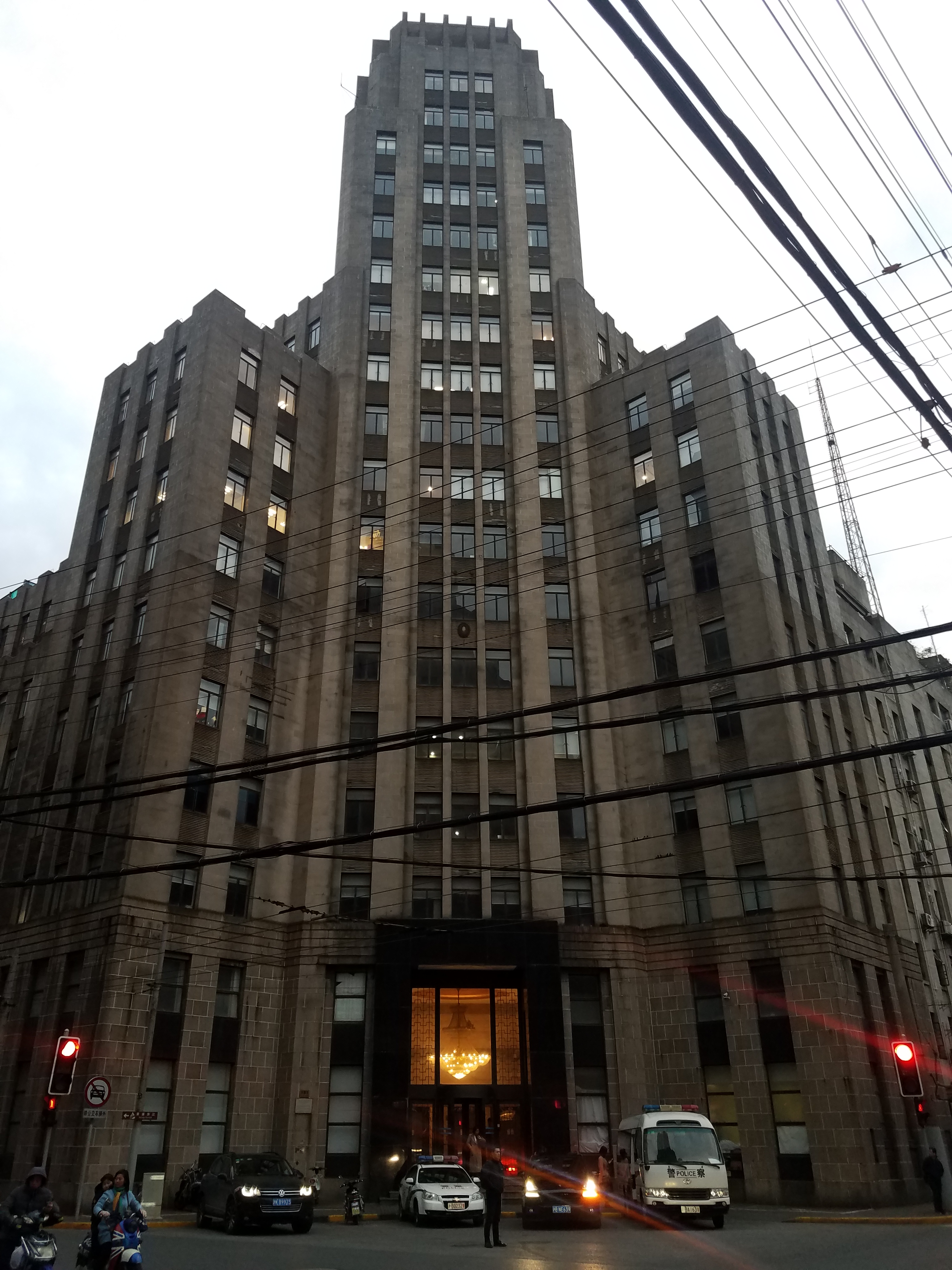
The Development Building on Fuzhou Road. The court was located on the 6th floor of this building from 1936 to 1941.

The United States Consulate and Court in Shanghai were occupied by the Japanese on December 8, 1941, at the beginning of the Pacific War. The Judge and other staff were interned for six months before being repatriated.

Americans continued to enjoy extraterritorial rights in those parts of China not occupied by the Japanese. On January 11, 1943, the U.S. and China signed the Treaty for Relinquishment of Extraterritorial Rights in China, thereby relinquishing all U.S. extraterritorial rights. The treaty was ratified by the United States Senate and came into force on May 20, 1943. As a result, both the U.S. Court for China and the U.S. Consular Courts in China were abolished. However, their judgments continued to serve as res judicata within China.

The last case before the court was heard in Kunming starting on 14 January 1943. Boatner Carney of the Flying Tigers was prosecuted for manslaughter before Special Judge Bertrand E. Johnson. Carney was convicted of unlawful killing and sentenced to two years imprisonment. He was pardoned six months later by President Franklin D. Roosevelt.

== Judges ==
=== Substantive appointments ===
List of Judges
Person	Term	Background
Lebbeus R. Wilfley	1906–1908	Attorney and former Attorney General of the Philippines.
Rufus Hildreth Thayer	1909–1913	Lawyer, law clerk in the US Department of Treasury, assistant to the Librarian of Congress and former Advocate General of the District of Columbia National Guard
Charles S. Lobingier	1914–1924	Law professor, former Judge of the Philippines Court of First Instance and later member of the U.S. Securities and Exchange Commission
Milton D. Purdy	1924–1934	Former city and county attorney, US Attorney and Assistant U.S. Attorney General
Milton J. Helmick	1934–1943	Former judge and Attorney General of New Mexico

=== Special Judges ===
Two individuals were also appointed Special Judges of the Court to try cases when the Judge was not available. They were:

- Nelson Lurton (1938 and 1941)
- Bertrand E Johnson (1943)

=== Commissioners ===
1. 1918–1920: Nelson Erroll Lurton (1883–1956)
2. 1920–1923: Ferno J. Schul (1889-??)
3. 1923–1928: Nelson Erroll Lurton (1883–1956)
4. 1928–1933: Alexander Krisel (1890–1983)
5. 1934-1937: William T. Collins (ex-officio as Clerk of the Court)
6. 1937–1941: Nelson Errol Lurton (1883–1956)

== Notable attorneys ==
The following attorneys of note were admitted to practice before the court:

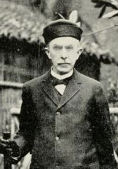
Thomas R. Jernigan, former U.S. Consul General in Shanghai

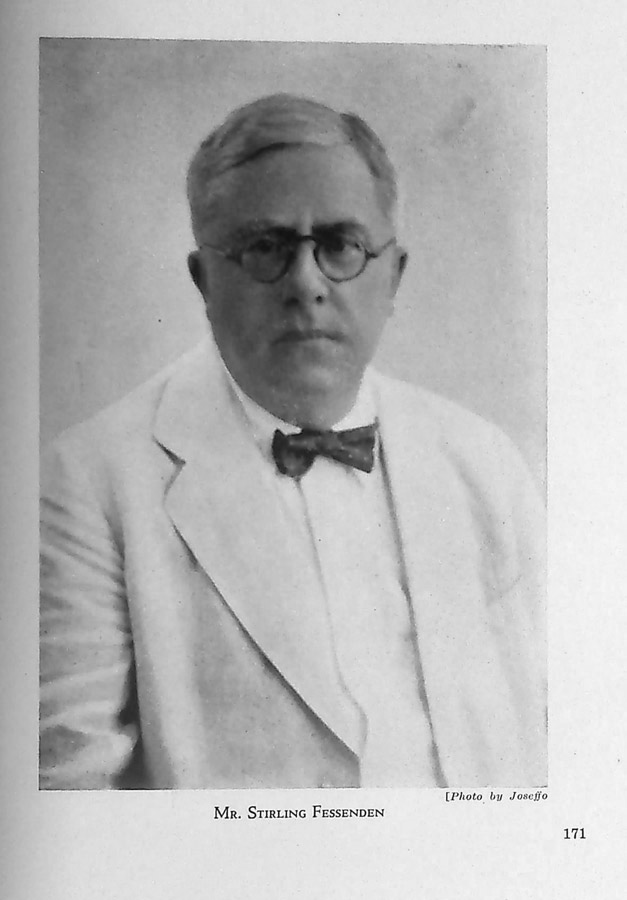
Stirling Fessenden, Chairman of the Shanghai Municipal Council (1923–1929); Secretary-General of the SMC (1929–1939)

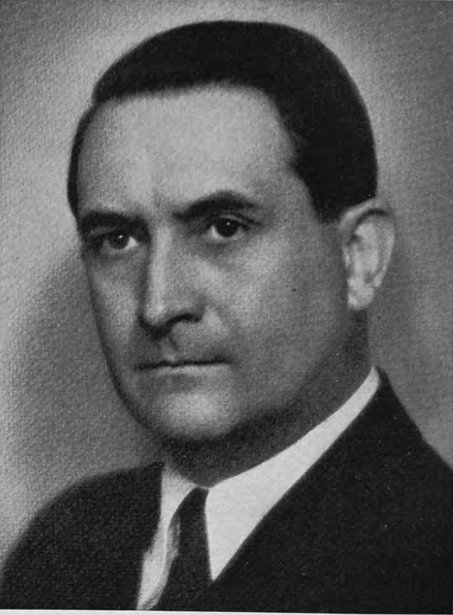
Cornell Franklin, Chairman of the Shanghai Municipal Council (1937–1938)

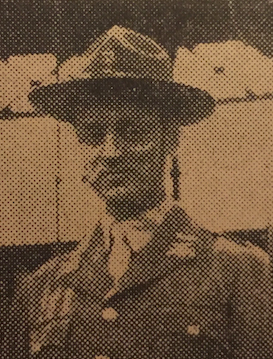
Norwood Allman, Member of the Shanghai Municipal Council (1940–1942)

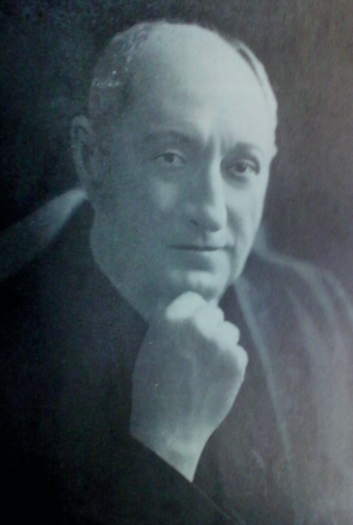
Edwin Cunningham, United States Consul General in Shanghai from 1920 to 1935, who was admitted to the bar of the Court in 1930, but did not practice before the Court

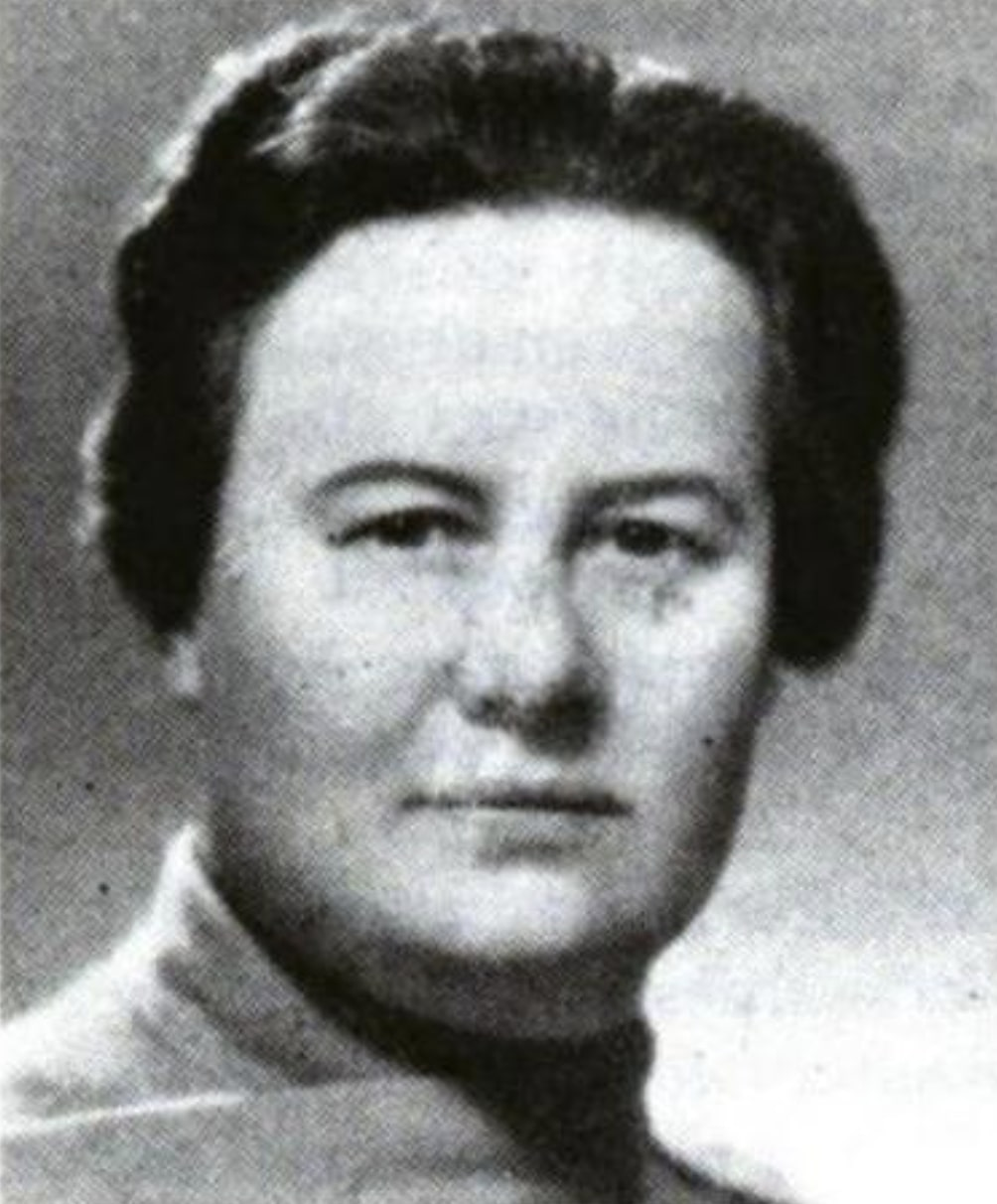
Addie Viola Smith, Trade Commissioner in Shanghai (1928–1939)

== See also ==
- Shanghai International Settlement
- British Supreme Court for China
