= Francisco Martínez Marina =

Spanish historian

The Most Excellent Francisco Martínez Marina
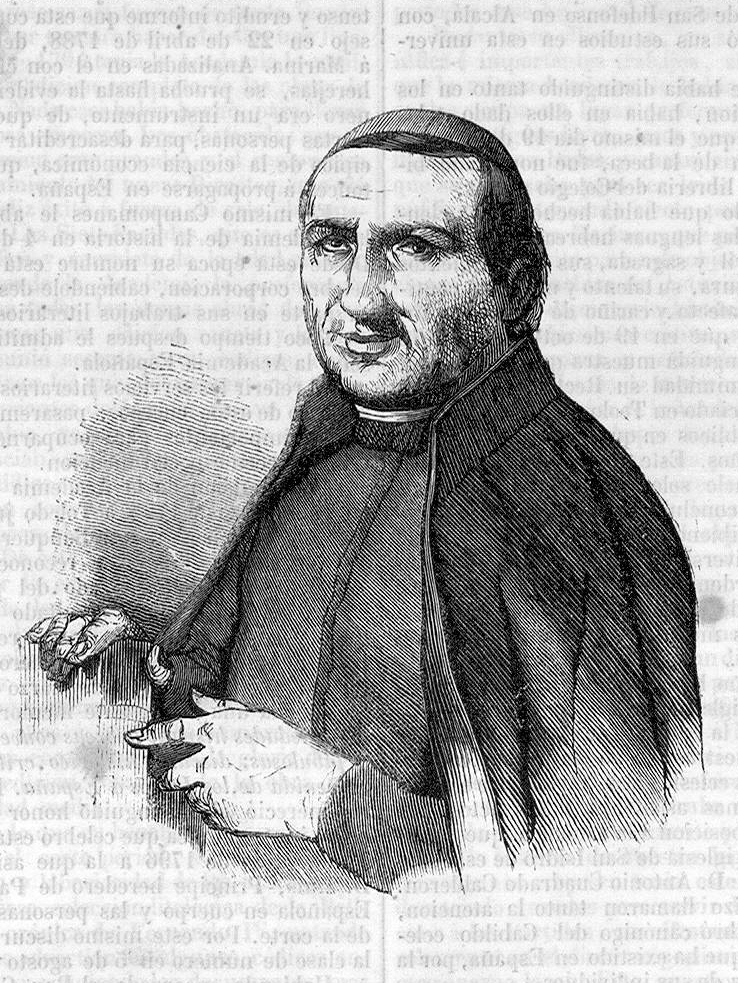
- Born: Francisco Xavier Martínez Marina; 10 May 1754; Oviedo, Spain
- Died: 25 July 1833 (aged 79); Zaragoza, Spain

Seat S of the Real Academia Española
- In office 1 January 1800 – 25 July 1833
- Preceded by: José Vela
- Succeeded by: Marcial Antonio López Quílez

Francisco Xavier Martínez Marina (10 May 1754 – 25 July 1833) was a noted Spanish jurist, historian and priest.

== Biography ==
Born in Oviedo, capital city of the Principality of Asturias in northern Spain, he was director of the Real Academia de la Historia, an institution dedicated to the study of Spain's political, civilian, ecclesiastical and military history. He also was a member of the Real Academia Española, the institution responsible for regulating the Spanish language.

During his lifetime, Marina published a number of well-known texts, including a treatise on the history and geography of Asturias, Diccionario geográfico-histórico de Asturias, and a study of principles of morality as they relate to legal policy and legislation, Principios naturales de la moral, de la política y de la legislación.

Marina also wrote diverse works on the history of Spanish law, including Ensayo histórico-crítico sobre la legislación y principales cuerpos legales de los reinos de León y Castilla especialmente sobre el código de las Siete Partidas de D. Alonso el Sabio (a study of the Siete Partidas, Spain's seven-part legal code that was followed for centuries both there and in Latin America), and a work entitled Juicio crítico de la Novísima Recopilación (Analysis of the Latest Compilation).

During the French occupation, he was given positions within the pro-French (Josephine) government, despite his unquestionable patriotism. He had a reputation as a liberal, progressive cleric, and the Afrancesados (pro-French faction) sought to win him over, leading to his appointment as a member of the 1811 Board of Public Instruction, alongside Pedro Estala and other scholars. Nevertheless, in 1810 and 1812, he contributed works to the London-based publication El Español.
The Bourbon Restoration and the return of the neo-absolutist King Ferdinand VII in 1814 altered his fortunes. His Teoría de las Cortes and Examen were banned by the Inquisition in November 1817, and he himself was persecuted and confined in Lérida between 1818 and 1820. The liberal revolution led by Rafael del Riego in January 1820 changed this situation, and he was subsequently set free.

Marina died in 1833, a resident of Zaragoza, the capital city of the autonomous region and former kingdom of Aragon in Spain.
