= A. Arthur Schiller =

American classical scholar (1902–1977)

Abraham Arthur Schiller (September 7, 1902, Oneonta, New York - July 10, 1977) was an American classical scholar.

== Career ==
Schiller earned his A.B. degree from the University of California, Berkeley in 1924, both an M.A. and J.D. there in 1926, and then was awarded a fellowship at Columbia University (1926–1928), which named him an assistant professor in 1928. In 1929 Schiller traveled to Munich to study Roman law with Max Radin and Coptic legal texts with Wilhelm Spiegelberg, and while there Schiller also participated in a seminar offered by Leopold Wenger. Columbia granted Schiller a J.D. in 1932, made him an associate professor in 1937, bestowed a full professorship upon him in 1949, and when Schiller retired in 1971, Columbia named him professor emeritus.

Schiller's first major contribution to scholarship was his J.D. thesis on Coptic law. However, he soon displayed the intellectual curiosity and its that characterized his entire career by writing well-regarded work in such disparate fields as Roman law, U.S. military law, Greek papyrology, agency law, and the Adat law of Indonesia, among others. Moreover, towards the end of his career Schiller "became the first American law professor to immerse himself in the study of African law," and subsequently "virtually originated African law studies in the United States." In furtherance of the field of African legal studies, he created the African Law Digest and founded Columbia's African Law Center. Due to Schiller's interest and expertise in African law, he was made a United Nations legal counsel for the purpose of writing a constitution for Eritrea, and he helped train Peace Corps volunteers being assigned to many African nations.

Schiller was a member of numerous scholarly organizations, including the Accademia dei Lincei, the Societe Internationale de Droits de L'Antique, and the Riccobono Seminar. Schiller's high standing in academia also resulted in his being a guest lecture and visiting professor in numerous universities around the world. In addition, Schiller was awarded three Guggenheim Fellowships, two Fulbright grants, a Rockefeller Fellowship, and, finally, shortly before he died, Schiller was granted a year's residence at Princeton University's Institute for Advanced Study.

However, despite Schiller's great scholarly success, he "carried his learning easily . . . remain[ing] the most open minded and approachable of scholars," whose "many kindnesses to his colleagues, and his students, and his unqualified empathy for Africans, made it inevitable that he would be deeply loved by all who had contact with him.

Schiller died from cancer in at the Fox Memorial Hospital in Oneonta in 1977, at age 74, leaving behind his wife, the former Erna Kaske, and two sons, Donald C. and Dr. Jerome K. Schiller.
