= Rufus Thayer =

American judge

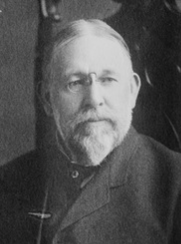
- Rufus Thayer, Judge of the United States Court for China

Judge of the United States Court for China
- In office 1909–1913
- President: Theodore Roosevelt
- Preceded by: Lebbeus R. Wilfley
- Succeeded by: Charles S. Lobingier

Personal details
- Born: June 19, 1850 Plymouth, Michigan, U.S.
- Died: July 12, 1917
- Education: University of Michigan

Rufus Hildreth Thayer (1850–1917) was, between 1909 and 1913, the judge of the United States Court for China based in Shanghai.

== Early life ==
Thayer was born in Plymouth, Michigan, on June 19, 1850. He graduated from the University of Michigan in 1871.

== Career ==
Thayer joined the Library of Congress as an assistant librarian. At the same time he studied law and graduated in 1874. He was appointed law clerk in the Treasury Department where he remained for ten years before leaving to form the law firm, Thayer & Rankin. He also served as a Judge Advocate General of the National Guard in Washington DC.

In 1909, he was appointed judge of the United States Court for China replacing Lebbeus R. Wilfley. He served until 1913, when he resigned when investigations were begun into some of the expenses he had claimed. Rather than face an investigation, Thayer resigned with effect from December 31, 1913. He was succeeded by Charles S. Lobingier

== Death ==
Thayer died on 12 July 1917 of apoplexy in Kingston, New York. He was buried at Albany Rural Cemetery, Menands, New York.
