= Samuel Parsons Scott =

American lawyer (1846–1929)

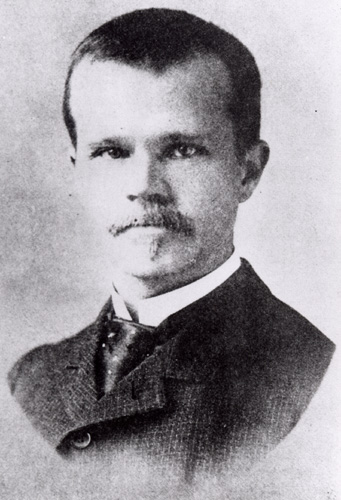
S.P. Scott

Samuel Parsons Scott (8 July 1846 – 30 May 1929), known as S. P. Scott, was an American attorney, banker and scholar. Scott is best known for his translations of historical legal texts, including the Visigothic Code, Las Siete Partidas and the Corpus Juris Civilis. His translation of Las Siete Partidas was well received, while his Corpus Juris Civilis translation was criticized by later legal scholars for its textual and scholarly limitations.

He was born in Hillsboro, Ohio, where he received a classics-based education at the Hillsboro Academy; he went on to earn his A.B. degree from the Miami University in 1868, was elected to Phi Beta Kappa, and obtained his A.M. degree from the same institution the following year. Scott was licensed to practice law in 1868 and was an attorney for several years in Leavenworth, Kansas and in San Francisco, but he left the practice of law in 1875 to return to Hillsboro and the family banking business. Thereafter, he also traveled in Europe, studied, and wrote. Late in his life, he served for many years on the editorial staff of the American Bar Association's Comparative Law Bureau.

== Scholarship ==
In the early 1860s, Scott wrote many articles about his travels in Spain and then reworked them into his first book, Through Spain, which was published in 1886. Scott demonstrated his growing interest in the history and culture of Europe during the Middle Ages and late antiquity in his work of popular scholarship The History of the Moorish Empire in Europe, which remains in print. He followed that in 1910 with his translation of early medieval Spanish law The Visigothic Code. The remainder of Scott's scholarship was not published until after his death in 1929. In 1931, after years of lobbying by Charles S. Lobingier, the American Bar Association's Comparative Law Bureau published Scott's Las Siete Partidas, an English translation of the law code ordered by Alfonso X of Castile, which was well received and was reprinted in 2001. In 1932 Scott's executors published his The Civil Law—the first English translation of the entire Corpus Juris Civilis.

Unfortunately, Scott did not base his translation of the Corpus Juris Civilis on the best available Latin versions, and his work was severely criticized. The noted English legal historian W. W. Buckland wrote that Scott "...had at his disposal an adequate latinity and has produced a version written in an English which can be read with pleasure. But much more than that was needed, and the work cannot be said to satisfy these further requirements." Buckland went on to say of some errors he noted: "These and many others like them would have disappeared if Mr. Scott had survived to see his work through the press..." But there were more fundamental problems with Scott's translation. Another commentator pointed out that while Scott had a good command of classical literary Latin, he was an amateur, operating on his own and that, moreover, "He did not use Mommsen's great critical edition of the Digest...limiting the usefulness of the translation...[and that] [a]lthough Scott's work was published in 1932, it shows no knowledge of any of the impressive achievements of Roman law scholarship made since the middle of the nineteenth century." Ironically, at the same time Scott was creating his solo translation, Fred H. Blume also was working by himself to translate Codex Justinianus and the Novellae Constitutiones, two parts of the same compilation ordered by Justinian I, Eastern Roman Emperor.

== Death and legacy ==
Late in life, Scott became reclusive—probably due to the controversy surrounding the voluntary liquidation of his bank and a desire to spend more time writing. When he died of pneumonia in 1929, at age 83, he left his 8,000-volume library and most of his large estate to the Jefferson Medical College to endow a library; this is now the Scott Memorial Library at Thomas Jefferson University. Despite the negative critical reception for some of his writings, on the whole they amount to an impressive achievement. Las Siete Partidas in particular has stood-up well to the test of time.

== Writings ==
Algernon Sidney, 6 POTTER’S AMERICAN MONTHLY 333-341 (May 1876).

Granada and the Alhambra, 1 (new series), 27 (old series) LIPPINCOTT’S MAG. OF POPULAR LITERATURE & SCI. 425-435 (May 1881).

Cordova, 2 (n.s.), 28 (o.s.) LIPPINCOTT’S MAG. POPULAR LITERATURE & SCI. 334-344 (Oct. 1881).

Seville, 3 (n.s.), 29 (o.s.) LIPPINCOTT’S MAG. POPULAR LITERATURE & SCI. 9-20 (Jan. 1882).

Pictures of Andalusia, 18 POTTER’S AM. MONTHLY 121-131 (Feb. 1882).

Tunis and Carthage (part 1), 18 POTTER’S AM. MONTHLY 481-491 (May 1882).

Tunis and Carthage (part 2), 18 POTTER’S AM. MONTHLY 601-610 (June 1882).

Toledo, 3 (n.s.), 29 (o.s.) LIPPINCOTT’S 529-540 (June 1882).

Sargossa, 5 (n.s.), 31 (o.s.) LIPPINCOTT’S 113-122 (Jan. 1883).

A National Pastime, 3 THE CONTINENT 387-396 (March 28, 1883).

THROUGH SPAIN: A NARRATIVE OF TRAVEL AND ADVENTURE IN THE PENINSULA. (Lippincott 1886; photoreprint British Library Historical Print editions 2011).

HISTORY OF THE MOORISH EMPIRE IN EUROPE (Lippincott 1904; photoreprint AMS Press 1977) (3 vols.).

Foreign Legislation, Jurisprudence and Bibliography—Spain, 1 ANN. BULL. COMP. L. BUREAU A.B.A. 64-65 (1908).

Foreign Legislation, Jurisprudence and Bibliography—Spain, 2 ANN. BULL. COMP. L. BUREAU A.B.A. 144–145, 152-153 (1909).

Spanish Jurisprudence Comparatively Considered, 2 ANN. BULL. COMP. L. BUREAU A.B.A. 14-25 (1909).

Spanish Criminal Law Compared with that Branch of Anglo-Saxon Jurisprudence, 3 ANN. BUL. COMP. L. BUREAU A.B.A. 62-80 (1910).

Foreign Legislation, Jurisprudence and Bibliography—Spain, 3 ANN. BULL. COMP. L. BUREAU A.B.A. 201-203 (1910).

Foreign Legislation, Jurisprudence and Bibliography—Spain, 4 ANN. BULL. COMP. L. BUREAU A.B.A. 167-168 (1911).

Foreign Legislation, Jurisprudence and Bibliography—Spain, 5 ANN. BULL. COMP. L. BUREAU A.B.A. 160-161 (1912).

Foreign Legislation, Jurisprudence and Bibliography—Spain, 6 ANN. BULL. COMP. L. BUREAU A.B.A. 112-114 (1913).

Foreign Legislation, Jurisprudence and Bibliography—Spain, 7 ANN. BULL. COMP. L. BUREAU A.B.A. 185-186 (1914).

THE VISIGOTHIC CODE (FORUM JUDICUM). (Boston Book Co. 1910; photoreprint Rothman 1982.)

THE LAWS OF ANCIENT CASTILLE and THE CRIMINAL CODE OF SPAIN (unpublished manuscripts, noted in 38 ANN. REP. A.B.A. 883 (1915).

European Literature and Legislation—Spain, 1 A.B.A.J. 164-166 (1915).

European Literature and Legislation—Spain, 2 A.B.A.J. 275-277 (1916).

European Literature and Legislation—Spain, 3 A.B.A.J. 265-269 (1917).

European Literature and Legislation—Spain, 4 A.B.A.J. 207-208 (1918).

Practice in the Courts of Ancient Rome, 24 CASE & COMMENT 687-699 (1918).

European Literature and Legislation—Spain, 5 A.B.A.J. 301-304 (1919).

European Literature and Legislation—Spain, 6 A.B.A.J. 337-340 (1920).

European Literature and Legislation—Spain, 7 A.B.A.J. 200 (1921).

European Literature and Legislation—Spain, 8 A.B.A.J. 248-249 (1922).

European Literature and Legislation—Spain, 9 A.B.A.J. 262 (1923).

European Literature and Legislation—Spain, 10 A.B.A.J. 284-285 (1924).

European Literature and Legislation—Spain, 11 A.B.A.J. 262-263 (1925).

European Literature and Legislation—Spain, 12 A.B.A.J. 339-340 (1926).

European Literature and Legislation—Spain, 13 A.B.A.J. 230-231 (1927).

LAS SIETE PARTIDAS (Commerce Clearing House & Comparative Law Bureau, Am. Bar. Assoc. 1931; modified reprint U. Penn. Press 2001)(5 vols.)).

THE CIVIL LAW (Central Trust Co. 1931 (17 vols.); photoreprint AMS Press 1973 (7 vols.); photoreprint Law Book Exchange (2001)(7 vols.)).
