= Milton D. Purdy =

American judge

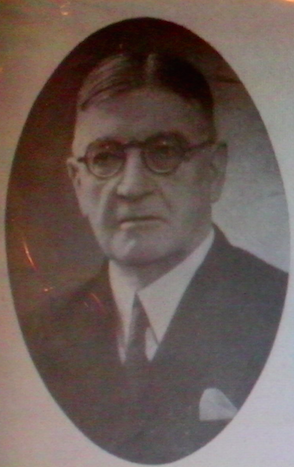
- Milton Purdy, Judge of the United States Court for China

Judge of the United States Court for China
- In office 1924–1934
- Appointed by: Calvin Coolidge
- Preceded by: Charles S. Lobingier
- Succeeded by: Milton J. Helmick

Judge of the United States District Court for the District of Minnesota
- In office March 6, 1909 – May 1, 1909
- Appointed by: William Howard Taft
- Preceded by: himself
- Succeeded by: Charles Andrew Willard

Judge of the United States District Court for the District of Minnesota
- In office July 6, 1908 – March 3, 1909
- Appointed by: Theodore Roosevelt
- Preceded by: William Lochren
- Succeeded by: himself

Personal details
- Born: Milton Dwight Purdy; November 3, 1866 Mogadore, Ohio, U.S.
- Died: February 11, 1937 (aged 70) Honolulu, Hawaii
- Education: University of Minnesota (A.B.); University of Minnesota Law School (LL.B.)

Milton Dwight Purdy (November 3, 1866 – February 11, 1937) was a United States district judge of the United States District Court for the District of Minnesota and later was a Judge of the United States Court for China.

== Education and career ==
Born on November 3, 1866, in Mogadore, Ohio, Purdy moved with his parents to Illinois in 1870. He graduated from high school there in 1884 and taught school there. During vacations he worked in his father's factory and learned the potters trade. Purdy received an Artium Baccalaureus degree in 1891 from the University of Minnesota and a Bachelor of Laws in 1892 from the University of Minnesota Law School. He was an assistant city attorney for Minneapolis, Minnesota from 1893 to 1897. He was an assistant county attorney for Hennepin County, Minnesota from 1897 to 1898. He was an Assistant United States Attorney for the District of Minnesota from 1898 to 1901. He was the United States Attorney for the District of Minnesota from 1901 to 1902. He served with the United States Department of Justice from 1903 to 1908, as a United States Assistant Attorney General from 1903 to 1905, and as an assistant to the Attorney General of the United States from 1905 to 1908. In his latter years in Washington, D.C., he became known as the "chief trust buster" for his work on anti-trust cases. He won the Northern Securities Co. v. United States case for the U.S.

== Federal judicial service ==
Purdy received a recess appointment from President Theodore Roosevelt on July 6, 1908, to a seat on the United States District Court for the District of Minnesota vacated by Judge William Lochren. He was nominated to the same position by President Roosevelt on December 8, 1908. His service terminated on March 3, 1909, after his nomination was not confirmed by the United States Senate. He received a second recess appointment from President William Howard Taft on March 6, 1909, to the same position, however, President Taft did not renominate him. His service terminated on May 1, 1909, due to his resignation.

== Later career ==
Following his resignation from the federal bench, Purdy returned to private practice from 1909 to 1922. He again served with the United States Department of Justice from 1922 to 1924, as a special assistant to the Attorney General of the United States. He was Judge of the United States Court for China from 1924 to 1934.

== Political activity ==
Between 1912 and 1916, Purdy was active in the Progressive political movement and was a national committee member of the Progressive Party.

== Final years and death ==
After completing his 10 year term as Judge of the United States Court for China. Purdy remained in Shanghai, China, working for a finance company until 1936, when he retired. Purdy died on February 11, 1937, in Honolulu, Hawaii.

== Sources ==
- Clark, Douglas (2015). Gunboat Justice: British and American Law Courts in China and Japan (1842–1943). Hong Kong: Earnshaw Books., Vol. 1: ISBN 978-988-82730-8-9; Vol. 2: ISBN 978-988-82730-9-6; Vol. 3: ISBN 978-988-82731-9-5
- Scully, Eileen P. (2001). Bargaining with the State from Afar: American Citizenship in Treaty Port China, 1842-1942. Columbia University Press. ISBN 978-0-231-12109-5.

Legal offices
Preceded by William Lochren	Judge of the United States District Court for the District of Minnesota; 1908–1909	Succeeded by himself
Preceded by himself	Judge of the United States District Court for the District of Minnesota; 1909	Succeeded by Charles Andrew Willard
Preceded by Charles S. Lobingier	Judge of the United States Court for China; 1924–1934	Succeeded by Milton J. Helmick
