= Annie Murray =

Scottish nurse in the Spanish Civil War

Annie Cargill Murray Knight
- Born: Anna Cargill Murray; 10 April 1906
- Died: 4 November 1996 (aged 90)
- Occupation: Nurse
- Known for: Supporting the International Brigades in the Spanish Civil War

Annie Cargill Knight (nee Murray; 10 April 1906 - 4 November 1996) was a Scottish nurse in the Spanish Civil War (1936-1939). Knight was the daughter of a tenant farmer and one of eight children. She became active in the Communist Party after she finished her training as a nurse. She was one of the first British volunteers to arrive in Spain on the side of the Spanish Republican Government during the Spanish Civil War.

== Biography ==
Annie Cargill Murray was born to George Wilson Murray and Anne Cargill in 1906 in Aberdeen, one of eight children who grew up in rural Perthshire, including brothers George Murray and Tom Murray, one of two Scots awarded special citations from the Republicans for their efforts during the Spanish Civil War. Murray trained as a nurse at the Edinburgh Royal Infirmary in 1936. While there, she protested with other nurses about the pay and working conditions.

Murray joined the Communist Party and went to Spain, as soon as her training finished.

She was followed to Spain and occasionally visited, by her brothers George (who served for two years and wounded) and Tom (served for about six months, but was wanted at home by the Communist Party in Scotland). They were among approximately 500 Scottish volunteers in the Spanish Civil War who believed in the principles of the Spanish Republican Government and travelled to the front to fight Fascism

Before Murray left Barcelona, she witnessed an act of atrocity:

"We found a whole lot of children, of dozens of them, with their hands off, completely off. The Italians had dropped anti-personnel bombs marked "Chocolatti". The children were picking up these things - they hadn't had chocolate for years - and they just blew their hands off. This Spanish surgeon that I worked with, he was in tears. We all were."

During the Second World War, Murray was in charge of an air-raid station in the Civil Defence of London.

She later said that the Spanish Civil War was the most important thing in her life, and that she did not regret going and "the Spanish war had a great impact on me" that it was a "terrible, terrible thing when the whole struggle collapsed.. the Fascists got the upper hand". Murray spoke at an unveiling of the memorial to the Spanish Civil War and Scottish lives lost in the International Brigades in Edinburgh's Princes Street Gardens in 1982 and her two brothers were also present.

She married Frank Knight in 1948 and moved to Dunfermline, Fife, upon her retirement in 1964, where she and her husband both died in 1996. Murray's letters are now at the National Library of Scotland, where a curator notes: "The 1930s were a man's world and it is extremely difficult to appreciate with modern perspectives what [Murray] and other volunteers did. Many of them had never even left Edinburgh before, never mind the country."

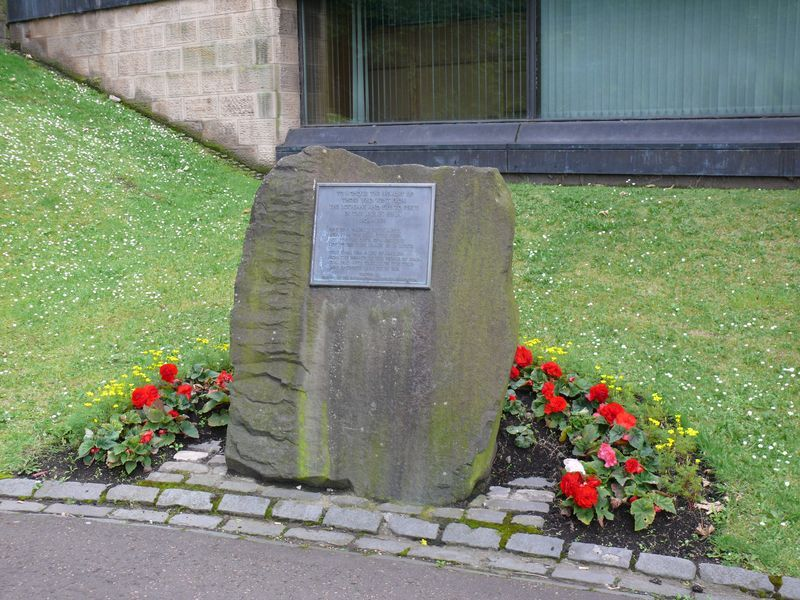
Memorial to Scottish international brigade volunteers in the Spanish Civil War; in Princes Street Gardens, Edinburgh

Murray spoke at the dedication of the memorial to the Scottish international brigade volunteers in Princes Street Gardens, Edinburgh in 1986.

== Work ==
After finishing her training as a nurse in Edinburgh, Murray went to Spain as a volunteer of the British Medical Aid Committee to support care for the International Brigades. Murray was one of the first British volunteers to arrive in Spain in September 1936 and she first worked with the republican forces in a small hospital in Huete with mostly untrained local staff, before moving to Barcelona to work in theatres with a team of Spanish doctors for about two and a half years in all. She witnessed serious injuries and although most of Murray's patients were volunteers with the International Brigades or Spanish Republic troops, she also treated prisoners of war from North Africa, known locally as 'Moors' and on another occasion, despite other patients' protests, a fascist soldier. She told her brother Tom of one Moor patient whose leg was seriously injured but had held on tight to a parcel, which nurses eventually got him to release so they could treat his bleeding. It was a bundle of obsolete German Marks (from 1914-20) which showed the exploitation of the mercenary Moors by Franco's regime.

She found Spanish doctors and equipment were very good, and she arranged for more equipment supplies to be sent from London, through the British Medical Aid Committee.

Murray found the Spanish people were good to the volunteers, although housing of local villagers was primitive compared to her home experience, and food and coffee was limited and of poor quality. She did get home leave and letters during the war and a break where Spanish people looked after nurses near the sea.

When Franco's troops entered Barcelona Murray left with patients invalided out and treated them in France briefly before heading for London in 1939. She worked in Dulwich Hospital. She went on to work for the Civil Defence in London before returning to work in a nursery in Stepney, an east end district of London and finally working near Mount Pleasant.
