= Riccobono Seminar =

American academic organization

The Riccobono Seminar was an American academic organization devoted to the study of Roman law. Officially titled “The Riccobono Seminar of Roman Law in America,” it was named in honor of the noted Italian scholar of Roman law, Salvatore Riccobono (1864-1958) and was associated with the Catholic University of America (CUA). The Riccobono Seminar was active from 1935 until 1957.

== Purpose ==
According to the preamble of the Seminar’s constitution, “Upon completion of a course of lectures by Dr. Salvatore Riccobono at the Catholic University of American during the year 1928-1929, a seminar was organized, of which he was elected Honorary Magister ad vitam” (Magister for life). The CUA invited Riccobono to lecture on Roman law due to the university’s special interest in that subject (it has had a School of Canon Law for many years) and because Dr. Riccobono was one of the giants in the field at that time. He was sixty-four in 1928 and “was at the top of an extraordinary career, with about sixty publications to his credit.” Riccobono gave two series of lectures: “Evolution of Roman Law from the Law of the Twelve Tables to Justinian,” and “Influence of Christianity on Roman Law in the IV and V Centuries A.D.” He based his first lecture series on his law review article "Outline of the Evolution of Roman Law," 74 Penn. Law Rev. 1 (1925.)

Afterwards, CUA officials announced: “Because of the splendid impression which Dr. Riccobono’s conduction of this series effected upon his audience, there was a spontaneous movement to insure the continuation of this or similar lectures in future years." A council, or "consilium," of Roman law scholars, organize the Riccobono Seminar to continue the study and teaching of Roman law in America after Riccobono returned to Italy. The consilium consisted of Charles Phineas Sherman, Charles Sumner Lobingier, Frederick de Sloovere, William de Lacy, Francis Lucidi, John J. Coady, Martin R. McGuire, William A. Losieniecke, Francis Bonora, John Vance, W. Winship Wheatley, Peter O. Monlem, and John C. Gunzelman.

== History ==
The first meeting of the Riccobono Seminar occurred on January 8, 1930 at the Catholic University of America. Roscoe Pound, dean of the Harvard Law School, chaired the session, and Charles S. Lobingier, the Seminar's first chairman (magister) gave his magisterial address "The Continuity of the Roman law." Following this inaugural session, the Seminar appears not to have met again until October of 1930, even though the group's intention was to meet monthly during the academic year. In the next several years, the Riccobono Seminar reconvened sporadically at various District of Columbia law schools approximately twenty times. The Seminar’s initial difficulties were caused by a lack of funding. During the 1934-35 academic year, the Seminar's charter members recognized that they needed to reorganize if the institution was to survive. Therefore, they drafted a new constitution which was approved by the Council in February of 1935. In a letter announcing the new constitution, the Scribe of the Seminar wrote: “The new constitution calls for a change of policy whereby more control will be vested in the Catholic University of America. In consideration of this, the administration of the University will be willing to finance the Seminar within reason. It seems hopeless to attempt to finance the Seminar in any other way at present. This is the reason for the alteration of the constitution."

Once on a sound financial and institutional footing, the Riccobono Seminar provided a forum in which leading American scholars of Roman law presented and discussed the results of their research. Several noted Roman law scholars from abroad also lectured at the Seminar. The list of Riccobono Seminar presenters includes many of the best regarded Roman law scholars and legal historians of the time. Among these were : H. Milton Colvin, Roscoe Dorsey, Charles S. Lobingier and Fritz Schulz (jurist); A. Arthur Schiller, Francis de Zulueta, J.B. Thayer, Ernest Levy, and Judge Fred H. Blume. Holding the Seminar in Washington D.C. also meant other notables were sometimes in attendance. The specially invited guests at one meeting included: Justice Pierce Butler (jurist) of the United States Supreme Court, Senator Joseph C. O'Mahoney, Professors Joseph Beale and Samuel Williston of the Harvard Law School, Professor John Wigmore of the Northwestern Law School, two law school deans, and several other law professors.

Dr. Riccobono involved himself with the Seminar for several years. Upon its reconstitution, he reported on its work in the journalBullettino dell’Istituto di Diritto Romano, which he edited. From the 1935-1936 sessions through those of 1938-1939, when the Second World War began, Riccobono offered extensive summaries of the Seminar’s papers and discussions in a special section of the “Bullettino” titled “Il Diritto Romano in America.” These reports ceased in 1940. This gap in coverage of Riccobono Seminar activities was filled by “Seminar,” a special annual edition of “The Jurist,” the CUA’s School of Canon Law journal. “Seminar” continued to publish papers delivered at meetings and to report on the group’s activities until 1955-1956. The Riccobono Seminar itself seems to have stopped functioning in 1956-57. As the “Seminar” noted, many outlets for articles on Roman law, legal history and comparative law had arisen since the war, making the “Seminar” unnecessary. There also had been a gradual decline in the Riccobono Seminar’s activities over the years. The annual number of papers delivered at monthly meetings dropped from eight in the 1943-44 academic year, to four in 1949-1950, and to two in 1954-55 and one in 1955-1956. However, in its prime during the decades of the 1930s and 1940s, the Riccobono Seminar admirably fulfilled its constitutional object of disseminating the knowledge of Roman law.
