= Milton J. Helmick =

American judge (1885–1954)

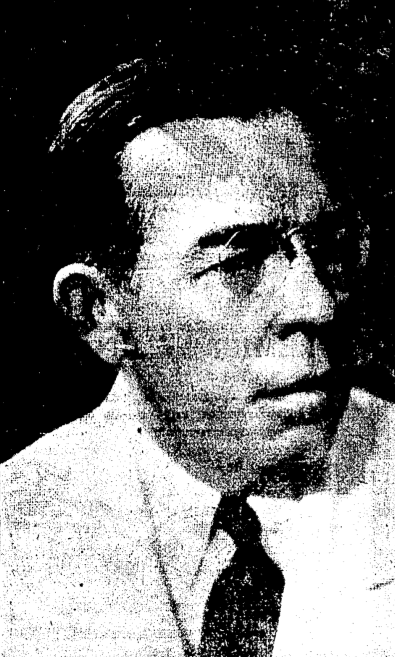
- Milton Helmick, Judge of the United States Court for China

Attorney General of New Mexico
- In office 1923–1925
- Governor: James F. Hinkle
- Preceded by: Harry S. Bowman
- Succeeded by: John W. Armstrong

Judge of the 2nd District of Albuquerque
- In office 1925–1934

Judge of the United States Court for China
- In office 1934–1943
- Preceded by: Milton D. Purdy
- Succeeded by: Position abolished

Personal details
- Born: 1885 Colorado, U.S.
- Died: October 1954 (aged 68–69) San Francisco, U.S.
- Education: Stanford University and University of Denver

Milton John Helmick (1885–1954) was Attorney General of New Mexico from 1923 to 1925, a judge in Albuquerque from 1925 to 1934, and the judge of the United States Court for China from 1934 to 1943.

== Early life ==
Milton John Helmick was a native of Colorado. Helmick attended Stanford University and then took a law degree from the University of Denver in 1910.

== Career ==
Milton John Helmick served as Attorney General of New Mexico from 1923 to 1925 and from 1925 to 1934 as judge for the 2nd District of Albuquerque.

In 1934, Helmick was appointed to a 10-year term as the Judge for the United States Court for China in Shanghai, China replacing Milton D. Purdy.

On December 8, 1941, Japanese troops occupied the United States consulate in Shanghai where the court was based. Helmick was interned for about half a year before being repatriated to America. His appointment as judge formally came to an end in May 1943 after the Treaty for Relinquishment of Extraterritorial Rights in China was ratified.

Helmick returned to China in 1944 to study the new Chinese legal system to prepare for dealing with the system after the defeat of Japan. Helmick then worked for the Standard Vacuum Oil Company in Shanghai from 1945 to 1951.

In 1953, Helmick was appointed Judge of the United States Consular Court for Casablanca and Tangiers where he tried one of the few cases of piracy against an American citizen in the 20th Century.

== Retirement and death ==
Helmick retired in January 1954 and died in San Francisco in October 1954 at the age of 69.

Legal offices
| Preceded by Harry S. Bowman | Attorney General of New Mexico; 1923–1924 | Succeeded by John W. Armstrong |
| Preceded by Milton D. Purdy | Judge of the United States Court for China; 1934–1943 | Succeeded by Position abolished |
