= Charles S. Lobingier =

American jurist and judge (1866–1956)

Charles Sumner Lobingier
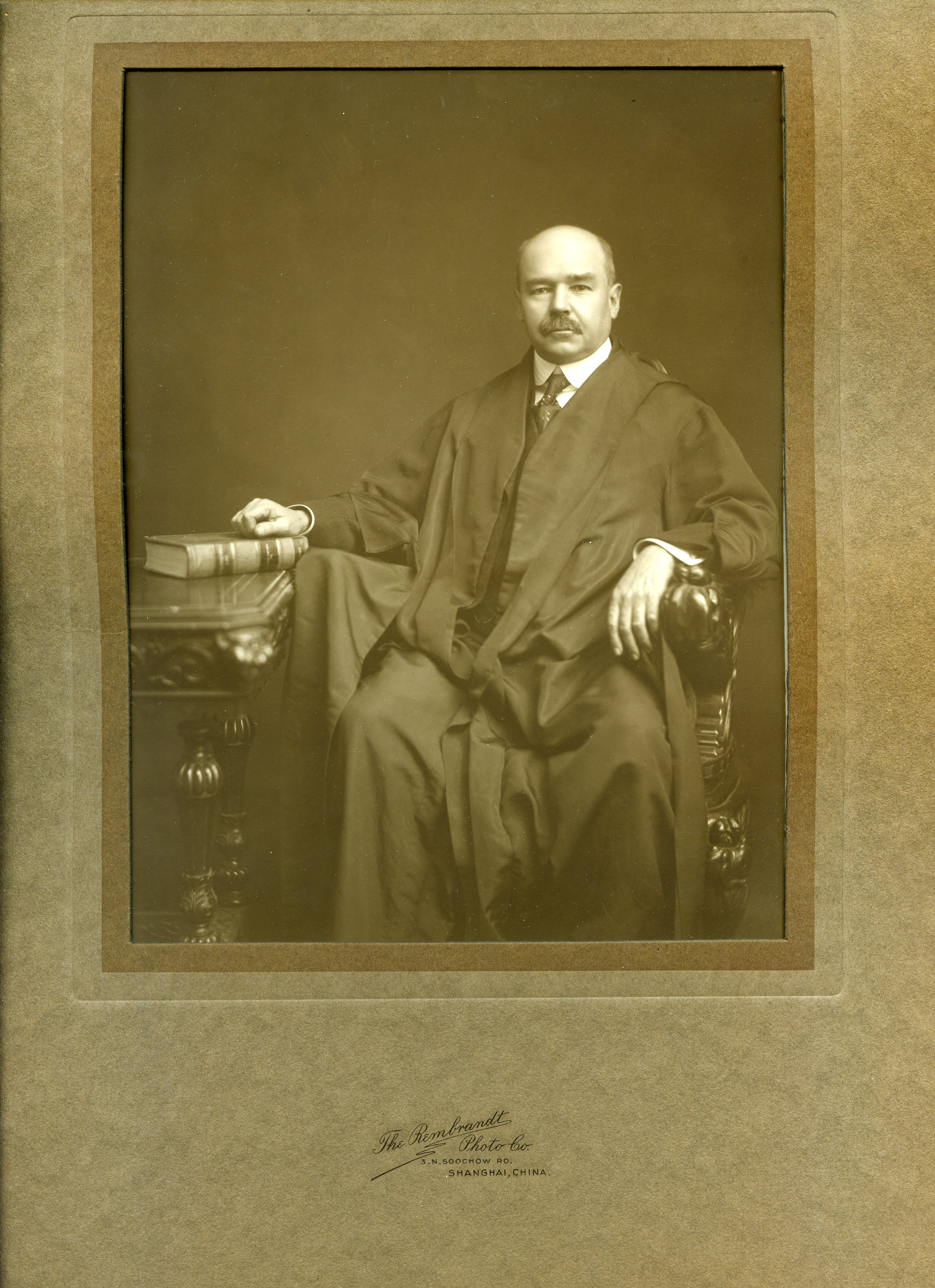
- Charles Lobingier, Judge of the United States Court for China

Judge of the Court of First Instance of the Philippines
- In office 1904–1914

Judge of the United States Court for China
- In office 1914–1924
- Preceded by: Rufus Thayer
- Succeeded by: Milton D. Purdy

Personal details
- Born: April 30, 1866 Lanark, Illinois, U.S.
- Died: 1956
- Education: University of Nebraska

Charles Sumner Lobingier (April 30, 1866 – April 28, 1956) was an American jurist who served as a judge of the Philippine Court of First Instance (now the Regional Trial Court) from 1904 to 1914 and as Judge of the United States Court for China in Shanghai from 1914 to 1924. He was also the author of a number of books on international and comparative law.

== Early life and education ==
Lobingier's paternal grandparents settled in Pennsylvania in the early 1700s, but Charles was born in Lanark, Illinois on April 30, 1866. He graduated from high school in Hebron, Nebraska, and he also taught school in that area before entering the University of Nebraska in 1884. Initially, he spent a year at the university's Latin School, where he was a classmate of Roscoe Pound.

At the University of Nebraska Lobingier earned an AB degree in 1888 (with Honors and election to Phi Beta Kappa), an AM in 1892 and an LLM in 1894. He was admitted to the Nebraska bar in 1890, practised there for ten years from 1892 to 1902, and married Ellen Ballon Hunker on 31 November 1898. From 1900 to 1903 he was a professor of law at the University of Nebraska College of Law and he was granted a PHD from that institution in 1903.

== Career ==
Lobingier served as a member of the Nebraska Court Commission from 1902 to 1903. (The commission was created to assist the Nebraska Supreme Court in eliminating the backlog of cases that had accrued over several years.) In 1904, after a year in this quasi-judicial position, he was appointed to the Philippines Court of First Instance and served in the Philippines for 10 years.

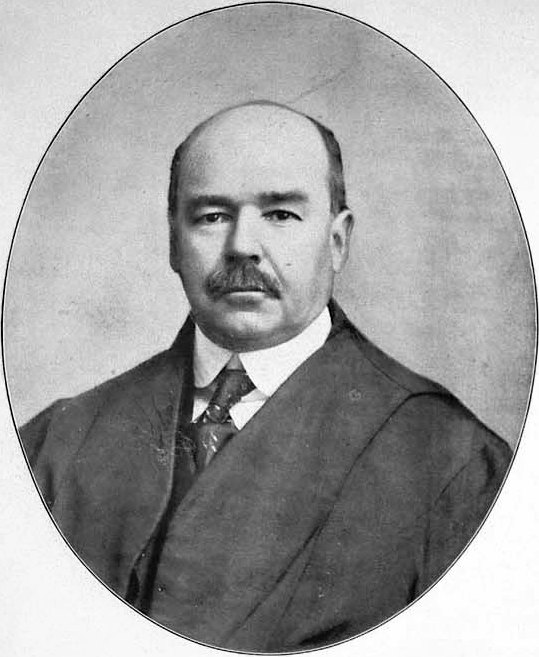
Lobingier in 1924

Following the resignation of Rufus Thayer as a Judge of the United States Court for China in 1913, Lobingier accepted an appointment to act as judge of that court from 1914. In 1917, Lobingier gave evidence before the House Committee on Foreign Affairs on the operation of the United States Court for China and in 1920 he compiled and edited case reports of the United States Court for China as well as other decisions relating to extraterritoriality from other courts including the British Supreme Court for China and Japan. He completed his 10-year term in 1924 and was succeeded by Milton D. Purdy.

== Academic appointments ==
Over the years, Lobingier taught law at the University of Nebraska, the University of the Philippines Law School, the University of California, the Comparative Law School of China, and at the National University School of Law in Washington, D.C. (which later merged with George Washington University's law school). Lobingier's longest-lasting teaching post was with National University, where he began teaching Civil Law in 1926 and ultimately, according to his own words, he taught courses in "analytical and historical Roman Law, the Institutes of Justinian, the evolution of modern civil law, and the principles of modern civil law." Among his writings is "The Evolution of the Roman Law" (1923) which he used as a text in some of his courses. In 1949 he was appointed as Honorary Consultant in Modern Civil Law by the Library of Congress. Lobingier was to become Professor of Roman and Modern Civil Law at American university in 1950, but he never assumed that post.

== Law practice, ABA work, and the Riccobono Seminar ==
Lobingier's teaching positions were mostly part-time, and he practised law as a government attorney for many years. He was a Special Assistant U.S. Attorney from 1925 to 1927, Special Counsel to the U.S.-Mexico Claims Commission in 1929–30, and a lawyer for the Securities and Exchange Commission from 1934 to about 1950. Lobingier also served as a legal adviser to the U.S. Military government of Korea in 1946.

One of Lobingier's most important professional activities was his work in the American Bar Association's Comparative Law Bureau, where he was an editor from 1907 to 1933. At the Comparative Law Bureau he successfully lobbied for publication by the Bureau of a translation of Las Siete Partidas (for which he also wrote an introduction) by Samuel Parsons Scott. Another of Lobingier's significant professional endeavors was his leadership in the Riccobono Seminar of Roman Law in America. He was the Seminar's magister more than once, and he presented many papers there.

== Death and legacy ==
Lobingier died on April 28, 1956.

The Lobingier Professorship was established at the George Washington University Law School in Washington, D.C., in 1978 through an endowment from the Charles S. Lobingier estate. The first incumbent of the chaired professorship was Leroy Sorenson Merrifield, who became a GW Law School professor emeritus.

== Writings ==
Some Original and Peculiar Features of the Nebraska Constitution, 15 ANNALS AM. ACADEMY POL. & SOC. SCI. 121-125 (1900).

Foreclosure in the Federal Courts, 51 CENTRAL L.J. 478-484 (1900).

Venue in Foreclosure Suits, 53 CENTRAL L.J. 403-409 (1901).

Foreclosure for Non-Payment of Interest, 54 CENTRAL L.J. 143-149 (1902).

Bondholders as Complainants in the Foreclosure of Corporate Mortgages, 54 CENTRAL L.J. 364-367 (1902).

THE POPULAR RATIFICATION OF CONSTITUTIONS: HISTORICAL-DOGMATICAL-CRITICAL (Ph.D. dissertation)(1903).

Blending Legal Systems in the Philippines, 21 L. Q. REV. 401-407 (1905).

A TREATISE ON PHILIPPINE PRACTICE (2nd ed. 1907).

Spanish Object-Lesson in Code-Making, 16 YALE L.J. 411-416 (1907).

Justice of the Peace: An Historical and Comparative Summary with Special Reference to the Philippines, 23 L.Q. Rev. 310-313 (1907).

The New Japanese Penal Code and its Doctrine of Extraterritorial Jurisdiction, 2 AM. J. INT’L. L. 845-849 (1908).

Civil Rights Through Common Law Remedies, 20 JURID. REV. 97-108 (1908–09).

THE PEOPLE’S LAW, OR POPULAR PARTICIPATION IN LAW-MAKING (1909).

Notes on International Law, 43 AM. L. REV. 759-769 (1909).

A Decade of Juridical Fusion in the Philippines, 3 ANN. BULL. 38-42 (1910).

Codification in the Philippines, 3 ANN. BULL. 42-47 (1910).

Spanish Law in the Philippines, 4 ANN. BULL. 32-43 (1911).

The Primitive Malay Marriage Law, 72 CENTRAL L.J. 423-426 (1911). Also published in 12 AM. ANTHROPOLOGIST 250-256 (1910).

Las Siete Partidas and its Predecessors, 1 CAL. L. REV. 487-498 (1912).

The Napoleonic Legislation, 5 ANN. BUL. 50-62 (1913).

A Bibliographical Introduction of the Study of Chinese Law, 26 GREEN BAG 399-407 (1914).

THE EVOLUTION OF THE CIVIL LAW (1915).

The Value and Place of Roman Law in the Technical Curriculum, 49 AM. L. REV. 349-373 (1915). Also published in 1 PHIL. L.J. 262-283 (1915), 1 So. L. Q. 330-337 (1916), 30 JURID. REV. 136-161 (1918), & 1 CHINA L. REV. 332-334 (1923).

Influence of the Roman Law Upon Anglo-American Jurisprudence, L. STUDENT HELPER 20-22 (1915).

The Beginnings of My Judicial Service in the Philippines, 22 CASE & COMMENT 1012-1021 (1915–16).

Reception of the Roman Law in Germany, 14 MICH. L. REV. 562-569 (1916).

Evolution of the German Civil Code, 1 So. L. Q. 330-337 (1916).

Judicial Superintendent in China, 12 ILL. L. REV. 403-408 (1918).

Napoleon and His Code, 32 HARV. L. REV. 114-134 (1918).

Homicide Concept, 9 J. AM. INST. CRIM. L. & CRIMINOLOGY 373-377 (1918).

American Courts in China, 5 PHIL. L.J. 52-61 (1918).

The International Mixed Court of Shanghai, 5 A.B.A.J. 188-198 (1919).

Expatriation of Native Citizens, 5 A.B.A.J. 198-211 (1919).

EXTRATERRITORIAL CASES (Charles Sumner Lobingier ed., 1920).

Revival of Roman Law, 5 CORNELL L.Q. 430-439 (1920).

Napoleon Centenary and Its Legal Significance, 7 A.B.A.J. 383-387 (1921).

TWENTY YEARS IN THE JUDICIARY (1922).

THE EVOLUTION OF THE ROMAN LAW FROM BEFORE THE TWELVE TABLES TO THE CORPUS JURIS (2nd ed.1923).

The Flowering of Roman Law, 1 CHINA L. REV. 269-275 (1923).

The Permanent Court of International Justice, 1 CHINA L. REV. 369-372 (1924).

Personal Reminiscences of Henry Dodge Estabrook, 9 ST. LOUIS L. REV. 245-249 (1924).

The Compensation of Expert Witnesses, 59 AM. L. REV. 266-277 (1925).

Common Law's Indebtedness to Rome, 11 A.B.A.J. 265-269 (1925).

Inter-American Negotiable Instruments Law, 60 AM. L. REV. 581-599 (1926). Also published in 12 A.B.A.J. 243-247 (1926).

SKETCHES OF SUPREME COUNCIL FOUNDERS (1927).

Albert Pike, the American Lawyer, 61 AM. L. REV. 388-409 (1927). Also published as A Lawyer of the Nineteenth Century, 13 A.B.A.J. 205-212 (1927).

THE DECISIONS OF THE UNITED STATES COURT FOR CHINA, 1920-1924 (Charles Sumner Lobingier ed.,1928).

The Marital Community: Its Origin and Diffusion—A Problem of Comparative Law, 14 A.B.A.J. 211-218 (1928).

An Historical Introduction to Community Property Law (not seen—reported in 14 A.B.A.J. 336 (1928) as having been published in the NAT’L. U. L. REV.)

Las Siete Partidas in Full English Dress, 15 A.B.A.J. 365-371 (1929).

The History of the Conjugal Partnership, 63 U.S. L. REV. 250-284 (1929).

The Cradle of Western Law—A Survey of Ultimate Juridical Sources (part 1), 63 U.S. L. REV. 572-580 (1929).

The Cradle of Western Law—A Survey of Ultimate Juridical Sources (part 2), 63 U.S. L. REV. 623-632 (1929).

The Cradle of Western Law—A Survey of Ultimate Juridical Sources (part 3), 64 U.S. L. REV. 8-15 (1930).

An Introduction to Chinese Law, CHINA L. REV. 121-132 (1930).

Factors in the Preservation of Roman Law, 19 GEO. L.J. 1-47 (1930).

Continuity of Roman Law in the East, 4 TUL. L. REV. 341-369 (1930).

THE SUPREME COUNCIL, 33RD DEGREE (1931) (with John Henry Cowles).

The Connecting Link in World Law, 4 CHINA L. REV. 327-372 (1931). (Also reported in 15 A.B.A.J. 513 (1929) as having been published in NAT’L. U. L. REV.)

Lex Christiana, the Connecting Link between Ancient and Modern Law: Part I, 20 GEO. L. J. 1-43 (1931).

Lex Christiana, the Connecting Link between Ancient and Modern Law: Part II, 20 GEO. L. J. 160-195 (1932).

THE ANCIENT AND ACCEPTED SCOTTISH RITE OF FREEMASONRY (1932).

Quarter Century of Our Extraterritorial Court, 20 GEO. L.J. 427-455 (1932).

An Historical Introduction to Community Property Law, 4 CHINA L. REV. 160-195 (1932).

Modern Expansion of Roman Law, 6 U. CIN. L. REV. 152-184 (1932).

Rise and Fall of Feudal Law, 18 CORNELL L.Q. 192-231 (1933).

The Franco-American Codes, 19 VA. L. REV. 351-380 (1933).

Shall China Have a Uniform Legal System, 6 CHINA L. REV. 327-334 (1933).

OBSOLETE FEATURES OF OUR FEDERAL CONSTITUTION (1934) (Gov. Printing Office).

The Judicial Opinions of Mr. Justice Thompson, 12 NEB. L. BULL. 421-426 (1934).

THE BEGINNINGS OF LAW: A SUMMATION OF RESULTS IN LEGAL ANTHROPOLOGY (1935).

Revival of Roman Law in the West, 7 CHINA L. REV. 116-136 (1935).

“The Laws of England” in the Thirteenth Century with a New Interpretation of the Barons’ Reply at Merton, 8 CHINA L. REV. 153-191 (1935).

The New Science of Man and Law's Place Therein, 9 CHINA L. REV. 107-124 (1936).

Jus Talionis: A Study in Legal Origins, 9 CHINA L. REV. 306-375 (1937).

The Nature and Origin of Law, 10 CHINA L. REV. 55-90 (1937).

Natural History of the Private Artificial Person: A Comparative Study in Corporate Origins, 13 TUL. L. REV. 41-69 (1939).

The Trial Authority in Administrative Procedure, 23 J. AM. JUD. SOC. 112-121 (1939).

Real Natural Law: A Comparative Study, 15 NOTRE DAME LAW. 26-46 (1939).

The Form and Repository of Law, 10 CHINA L. REV. 165-178 (1940).

The Place of Administrative Law in Legal Classification, 24 J. AM. JUD. SOC. 87-94 (1940).

Historical Background of Administrative Law: The Inquest Procedure, 16 NOTRE DAME LAW. 29-46 (1940).

Acheson Committee and the S.E.C. Trial Examiners, 30 GEO. L.J. 1-16 (1941).

Administrative Law and Droit Administratif, 91 U. PA. L. REV. 36-58 (1942).

Our “Model Code of Evidence”: How Shall it Be Adopted?, 91 U. PA. L. REV. 581-600 (1943).

Legal Education in Twentieth Century China, 4 LAW. GUILD. REV. 1-5 (1944).

The Status of the American State—What its Activities Are and Should Be, 18 TEMP. L.Q. 237-263 (1944).

Pan-Americanism: Preparation for World Peace, TEMP. L.Q. 435-472 (1944).

Corpus Juris of New China, 19 TUL. L. REV. 512-552 (1945).

What of the World Court Now?, 43 MICH. L. REV. 833-866 (1945).

The Operation of Law—A Comparative Study with Special Reference to Recent and Pending Legislation, 19 TEMP. L.Q. 63-88 (1945).

Precedent in Past and Present Legal Systems, 44 MICH. L. REV. 955-996 (1946).

Juristic Acts in the Civil Law, 24 TUL. L. REV. 178-193 (1949).

Law's Anthropological Background, 9 CHINA L. REV. 211-226 (1936).
