= Salvatore Riccobono =

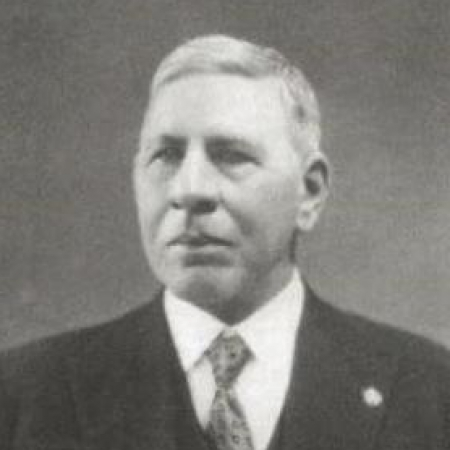
Salvatore Riccobono

Salvatore Riccobono (January 31, 1864 in San Giuseppe Jato – April 5, 1958 in Rome) was an influential Italian Roman law scholar.

== Early life and education ==
Riccobono was born on January 31, 1864, in the village of San Giuseppe Jato, near Palermo, Sicily. He received his early education in Palermo, then served in the Italian army at age 20. Afterwards, he attended the University of Palermo, earning his law degree in 1889. Riccobono’s future career as a scholar of Roman law was affected greatly by his four years of graduate study in Germany, where he learned from such noted scholars as Ernst Eck, Heinrich Dernburg, Otto Lenel, Otto Gradenwitz, and Bernhard Windscheid from 1889–93. His year at the University of Leipzig, in 1890–91, with Windscheid, had an especially strong impact on his career.

== Career ==
When Riccobono returned to Italy in 1893, he gained from his association with another eminent Roman law scholar, Vittorio Scialoja, who helped him find a university position there. Riccobono held positions at the universities of Parma (1895), Camerino (1895–96), and Sassari (1897) until he was given the chair of Roman law at his alma mater, the University of Palermo. He served at the University of Palermo from 1897 until 1931, acting at different times as rector of the university and dean of the faculty of law, in addition to being a faculty member. In 1932, he replaced Scialoja at the Universita di Roma. Dr. Riccobono also taught history and Roman law at the Pontifical Lateran Institute in Rome until he retired completely at the end of 1955.

== Legacy ==
In the course of his sixty-five year career as a scholar of Roman law, Riccobono contributed much to the literature of his field, but three contributions in particular should be mentioned. He was the first to evaluate critically the then recently rediscovered technique of interpolation and to use the study of interpolations as a means to understand changes in classical law doctrines, instead of viewing the discovery of interpolations as an end in itself. Also, his study of the Scholia Sinaitica was especially useful and well received. And Riccobono was one of the scholars who edited the pre-Justinian sources of Roman law, which was published as Fontes Iuris Romani Antejustiniani (1909). He had a reputation as “the Great Conservative” among modern Roman historians and insisted that Justinian’s Corpus Juris Civilis was Roman in spirit, rather than Hellenistic.

Riccobono directly influenced Roman law scholarship in the United States, as well. In 1928-29, the Catholic University of America invited him to give a course in Roman law. He gave one series of lectures on the “Evolution of Roman Law from the Law of the Twelve Tables to Justinian,” and a second on the “Influence of Christianity on Roman Law in the IV and V Centuries A.D.” In response to these lectures, the Catholic University created “The Riccobono Seminar of Roman Law in America,” which operated until 1956. Many of the best regarded Roman law scholars in America, as well as guests from foreign countries, presented papers at the Seminar, and Riccobono himself remained in contact with it as he could for decades. He was appointed Magister of the seminar for life, and for many years, he reported on the Seminar’s activities in the Roman law journal he edited—the Bullettino dell’Istituto di Diritto Romano.

== Honors ==
In 1924, Riccobono was awarded a Doctor Honoris Causa of Civil Law by Oxford University, and he was elected a member of the Royal Academy of Italy in 1932. He also was a member of the Roman Academy of St. Thomas Aquinas and of the Catholic Religion.

== Additional Biographical and Bibliographical Information ==
For a detailed list of biographical writings and memories of Salvatore Riccobono in addition to those mentioned here, see Rosanna Ortu's article at the Diritto Storia web site . Sanfilippo has provided a full list of his writings in chronological order. See also a biographical profile by Mario Varvaro in: Dizionario Biografico dei Giuristi Italiani (sec. XII-XX), eds. I. BIROCCHI ET AL., Bologna 2013 (ISBN 9788815241245), 1685-1688. Roberto De Ruggiero – Salvatore Riccobono – Filippo Vassalli: Lezioni. Scuola di Diritto Romano e Diritti Orientali 1930 – 1932 raccolte da Károly Visky. (A cura di G. Hamza, Introduzione di O. Diliberto, Trascrizione e note al testo di L. Migliardi Zingale), In: Pubblicazioni del Dipartimento di Scienze Giuridiche. Università degli Studi di Roma „La Sapienza”. Jovene Editore, Napoli, 2015.
