= Alonso Díaz de Montalvo =

Spanish jurist

Alonso Díaz de Montalvo (1405–1499) was a Spanish jurist.

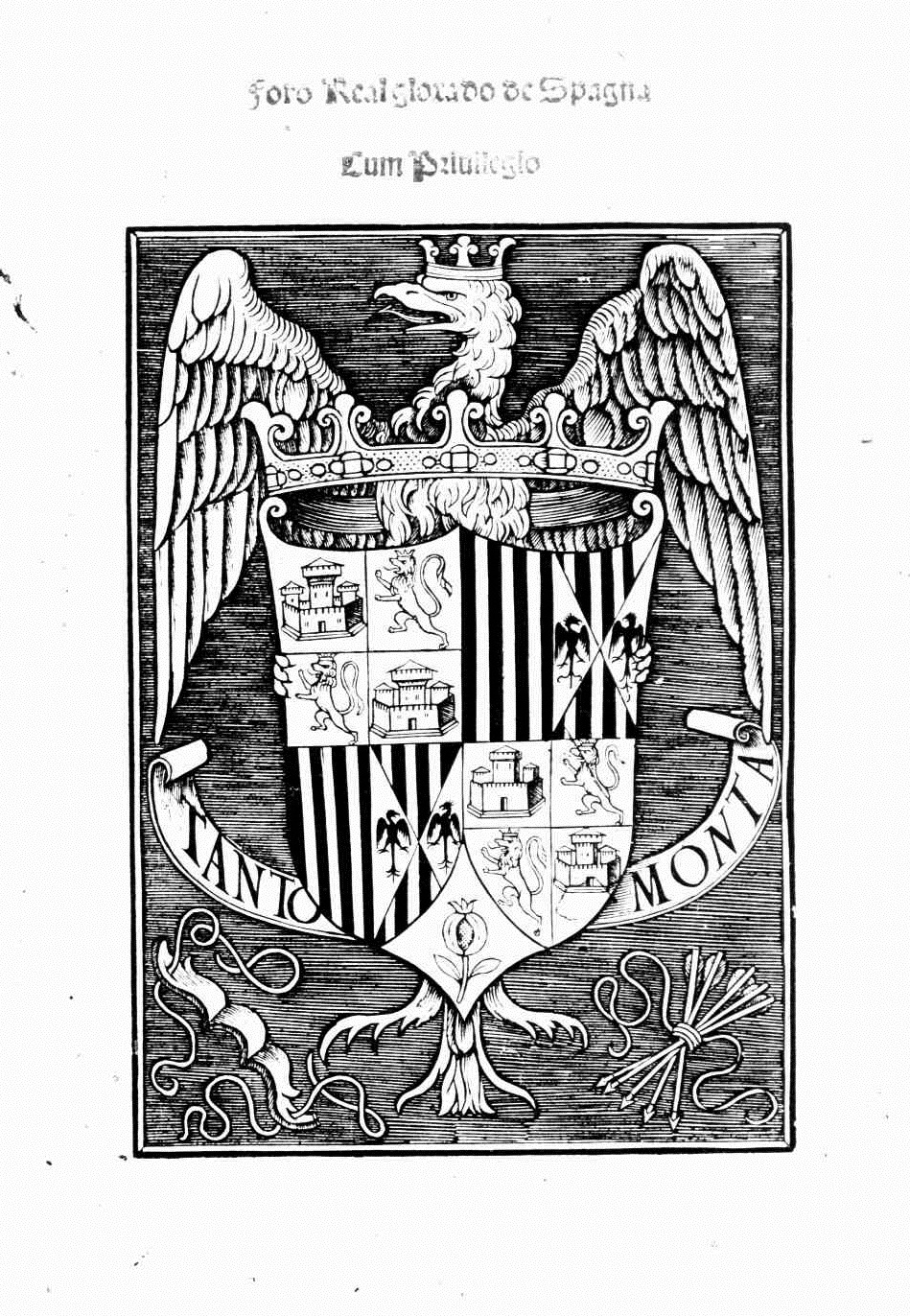
Fuero real, 1500

After studying law at Lleida and Salamanca, he served in high judicial and administrative offices under the Catholic Monarchs. In 1480, he was commissioned to draft the Libro de Leyes, also known as Ordeniamento de Montalvo. This unifying codification of the law of Leon and Castile would remain in effect, in large parts, up until the 19th century.

== Works ==
- Repertorium quaestionum super Nicolaum de Tudeschis (in Latin). Seville. 1477.
- Fuero real (in Latin). Venice: Andrea Torresano. 1500.
