= Miles Lord =

American judge (1919–2016)

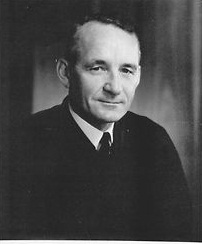
- Lord in 1968

Senior Judge of the United States District Court for the District of Minnesota
- In office July 1, 1985 – September 8, 1985

Chief Judge of the United States District Court for the District of Minnesota
- In office 1981–1985
- Preceded by: Edward Devitt
- Succeeded by: Donald Alsop

Judge of the United States District Court for the District of Minnesota
- In office April 28, 1966 – July 1, 1985
- Appointed by: Lyndon B. Johnson
- Preceded by: Dennis F. Donovan
- Succeeded by: David S. Doty

United States Attorney for the District of Minnesota
- In office 1961–1966
- President: John F. Kennedy; Lyndon B. Johnson
- Preceded by: Fallon Kelly
- Succeeded by: Patrick J. Foley

22nd Attorney General of Minnesota
- In office January 3, 1955 – May 4, 1960
- Governor: Orville Freeman
- Preceded by: Joseph A. A. Burnquist
- Succeeded by: Walter Mondale

Personal details
- Born: Miles Welton Lord; November 6, 1919 Dean Lake, Minnesota, U.S.
- Died: December 10, 2016 (aged 97) Eden Prairie, Minnesota, U.S.
- Party: Democratic (DFL)
- Children: 4, including Jim
- Education: University of Minnesota (BA, LLB)

Military service
- Branch/service: United States Army; Army Air Forces
- Battles/wars: World War II

Miles Welton Lord (November 6, 1919 – December 10, 2016) was a United States district judge of the United States District Court for the District of Minnesota.

== Education and career ==
Born November 6, 1919, in Dean Lake, Minnesota, Lord served in the United States Army Air Forces from 1944 to 1945. He received a Bachelor of Arts degree in 1946 from the University of Minnesota and a Bachelor of Laws in 1948 from the University of Minnesota Law School. He entered private practice in Minneapolis, Minnesota from 1948 to 1951. He served as an Assistant United States Attorney for the District of Minnesota from 1951 to 1952, returning to private practice from 1952 to 1954. He served as Attorney General of Minnesota from 1955 to 1960, returning to private practice from 1960 to 1961. He was the United States Attorney for the District of Minnesota from 1961 to 1966. While in private practice, Lord founded Lord & Associates Law Office, which is still operated by his descendants.

== Federal judicial service ==
Lord was nominated by President Lyndon B. Johnson on February 10, 1966, to a seat on the United States District Court for the District of Minnesota vacated by Judge Dennis F. Donovan. He was confirmed by the United States Senate on April 28, 1966, and received his commission on April 28, 1966. He served as Chief Judge from 1981 to 1985. He assumed senior status on July 1, 1985. His service terminated on September 8, 1985, due to his retirement.

== Landmark decisions ==
In his first landmark and historic decision in 1973, when the Reserve Mining Company's processing plant at Silver Bay, Minnesota, was dumping 47 tons of waste rock into Lake Superior every minute, Lord ultimately forced Reserve to stop dumping the pollutants, taconite tailings. In the Reserve Mining decision, Lord said, "This court cannot honor profit over human life." Later, he pursued the A. H. Robins Company for malpractice in issuing the Dalkon Shield intrauterine device, which was on sale from 1970 to 1974 and caused at least 18 deaths and thousands of injuries (350,000 women have claimed injury). It was chronicled in the book, Lord's Justice, by Robert Wagman and Sheldon Engelmayer.

The trial was for the injured, as he felt the deaths were too hard to "pinpoint the responsibility".

The whole cost-benefit analysis is warped. They say, well you can kill so many people if the benefits are great enough. Then they can take the benefits and circulate them through the given industry, they circulate them through the oil company, through the gasoline station, through the garage, the hardware store, the drugstore, the shoemaker, the grocery store, and if they don't have enough statistics there they just circulate them through a bunch of other businesses. Once they put a price on human life, all is lost. Life is sacred. Life is priceless.

Lord's rebuke to the corporate heads held them personally accountable. To settle seven lawsuits, he made Robins' top three executive sign a $4.6 million settlement agreement and personally held them liable. The company ended up paying more than $220 million in compensation and $13 million in punitive damages to thousands of plaintiffs. In 1980 in the case of Shyamala Rajender versus the University of Minnesota, Lord ordered the university to desist from discrimination against women.

A judicial review panel met to determine if there were errors on his professional and judicial conduct in the Robbins case. Lord was cleared of wrongdoing and went on to serve another year until his retirement.

== Post judicial service, family, and death ==
After his retirement from the federal bench, Lord returned to the private practice of law with Lord & Associates Law Office. He lived in Chanhassen, Minnesota. His son Jim Lord served in the Minnesota Senate and as Minnesota State Treasurer and died on June 6, 2008. His eldest daughter, Priscilla Lord, ran against satirist Al Franken in the Democratic Party primary in 2008 for the Senate seat held by Norm Coleman. Miles Lord, Jr. (Mick) served as a top assistant to State Auditor Robert W. Mattson Jr. and later managed the business affairs of the Miles Lord & Associates law office prior to his death on April 12, 2012. Miles' youngest daughter, Virginia, is a lawyer and real estate agent for Coldwell Banker Burnet in Wayzata, Minnesota. Lord died on December 10, 2016, in Eden Prairie, Minnesota.

== See also ==
- Engelmayer, Sheldon D. (September 22, 1985). Lord's Justice : One Judge's War Against the Infamous Dalkon Shield (New York Times Review). New York: Doubleday Publishing. ISBN 0385230516.
- Mintz, Morton (1985). At Any Cost: Corporate Greed, Women, And The Dalkon Shield. New York: Pantheon. ISBN 9780394548463.
  - Abstract: Morton Mintz (January 15, 1986). "A Crime Against Women: A.H. Robins and the Dalkon Shield". Multimedia Monitor. 7 (1). – Includes full text of presiding judge Miles Lord's statement to Clairbone Robins, et al., at bottom.
  - Reviewed and summarised by: Tamar Lewin (January 12, 1986). "What Standards For Corporate Crime?". New York Times.

Party political offices
Preceded by Allan L. Johnson	Democratic nominee for Attorney General of Minnesota; 1954, 1956, 1958	Succeeded by Walter Mondale
Legal offices
Preceded by Joseph A. A. Burnquist	Minnesota Attorney General; 1955–1960	Succeeded by Walter Mondale
Preceded by Dennis F. Donovan	Judge of the United States District Court for the District of Minnesota; 1966–1985	Succeeded by David S. Doty
Preceded by Edward Devitt	Chief Judge of the United States District Court for the District of Minnesota; 1981–1985	Succeeded by Donald Alsop
