= Morton Mintz =

American journalist (1922–2025)

- Born: January 26, 1922; Ann Arbor, Michigan, U.S.
- Died: July 28, 2025 (aged 103); Washington, D.C., U.S.
- Occupation: Investigative journalist
- Known for: The Washington Post; St. Louis Star-Times; Globe-Democrat
- Spouse: Anita Franz (m. 1947; died 2015)
- Children: 4

Morton Abner Mintz (January 26, 1922 – July 28, 2025) was an American investigative journalist who in his early years (1946–1958) reported for two St. Louis, Missouri, newspapers, the Star-Times and the Globe-Democrat; and then, most notably The Washington Post (1958–1988). He exposed such scandals as thalidomide and the Dalkon Shield. From 2004 onwards, he was a Senior Adviser to Nieman Watchdog.

== Early life and education ==
Mintz was born January 26, 1922, in Ann Arbor, Michigan. His parents were William and Sarah (Solomon) Mintz, Jewish immigrants from Lithuania who owned a dry goods store.

Mintz attended the University of Michigan, graduating in 1943. He then enlisted in the Navy, and in June 1944, commanded a transport ship during the Normandy landings.

== Career ==
Mintz began his reporting career in 1946 at the St. Louis Star-Times. In 1955, now at the St. Louis Globe-Democrat, he wrote the nation's first newspaper series on the plight of the mentally disabled. After moving to the Washington Post in 1958, Mintz broadened conventional definitions of "news" with people-oriented reporting on issues, mainly involving the pharmaceutical, medical-device, tobacco, oil, automobile, and insurance industries.

In 1962, Mintz broke the story of thalidomide, the sedative/tranquilizer that caused several thousand children worldwide to be born without arms, legs, or any limbs at all. Although the press had greeted the advent of the original oral contraceptive uncritically, Mintz revealed that in giving its approval in 1960, the FDA had launched the greatest uncontrolled medical experiment in human history. Tens of millions of healthy women were taking The Pill 21 days a month, often throughout their child-bearing lifespan, on the basis of inadequate scientific evidence of safety.

Mintz also reported on numerous unsafe and/or ineffective medicines and medical devices, including cholesterol-lowering MER/29, which afflicted thousands with cataracts; Oraflex, a killer anti-arthritis drug withdrawn by the manufacturer only a few months after sales began, and the Dalkon Shield and Cu-7 IUDs.

Starting in 1965, and continuing into 1999, Mintz reported on the tobacco industry, including the 1988 smoker-death trial in which cigarette makers were compelled to disclose for the first time what they knew about the dangers of smoking and when they knew it. In 1993, Mintz wrote the book Allies: The ACLU and the Tobacco Industry, which exposed the American Civil Liberties Union's conflict of interest in advocating a key industry cause in the U.S. Congress and soliciting and accepting money from that industry, both while disclosing nothing to ACLU members of either activity.

In 1966, Mintz broke the story of the tailing of Ralph Nader by a private detective retained by General Motors and for years covered automotive safety issues. He was often alone in reporting grave corporate crime and misconduct. Mintz covered the U.S. Supreme Court's 1965 and 1978-1980 terms. In 1983, he reported on the refusal of the United States during World War II to bomb the rail lines to the gas ovens at Birkenau and the Auschwitz death camp. He based the story on an exclusive interview with John J. McCloy, who as an assistant Secretary of War had played a key role in the episode.

== Personal life and death ==
Mintz lived in Washington, D.C. He was married for 68 years to Anita Franz, until her death in 2015; they had four children.

Mintz turned 100 years old in January 2022, and died on July 28, 2025, at the age of 103.

== Awards ==
- Columbia Journalism Award, Columbia University (1983)
- Washington-Baltimore Newspaper Guild Award for Public Service (twice)
- Playboy Foundation's Hugh M. Hefner First Amendment Award for Lifetime Achievement
- Worth Bingham Memorial Award
- Heywood Broun Memorial Award
- Raymond Clapper Memorial Award (1962)
- George Polk Memorial Award

== Books ==
=== Authored ===
- At Any Cost: Corporate Greed, Women, and the Dalkon Shield (1985)
- The Pill: An Alarming Report (1970)
- By Prescription Only: A report on the roles of the United States Food and Drug Administration, the American Medical Association, pharmaceutical manufacturers, and others in connection with the irrational and massive use of prescription drugs that may be worthless, injurious, or even lethal (1967). It updated:
- The Therapeutic Nightmare: A report on prescription drugs, the men who make them, and the agency that controls them (1965)

=== Co-authored ===
- America, Inc.: Who Owns and Operates the United States (1971), with Jerry S. Cohen
- Power, Inc. (1976), with Jerry S. Cohen
- Quotations from President Ron (1987), with Margaret Mintz
- President Ron's Appointment Book (1988), with Anita Mintz
