= Marilyn Henry =

American author and historian

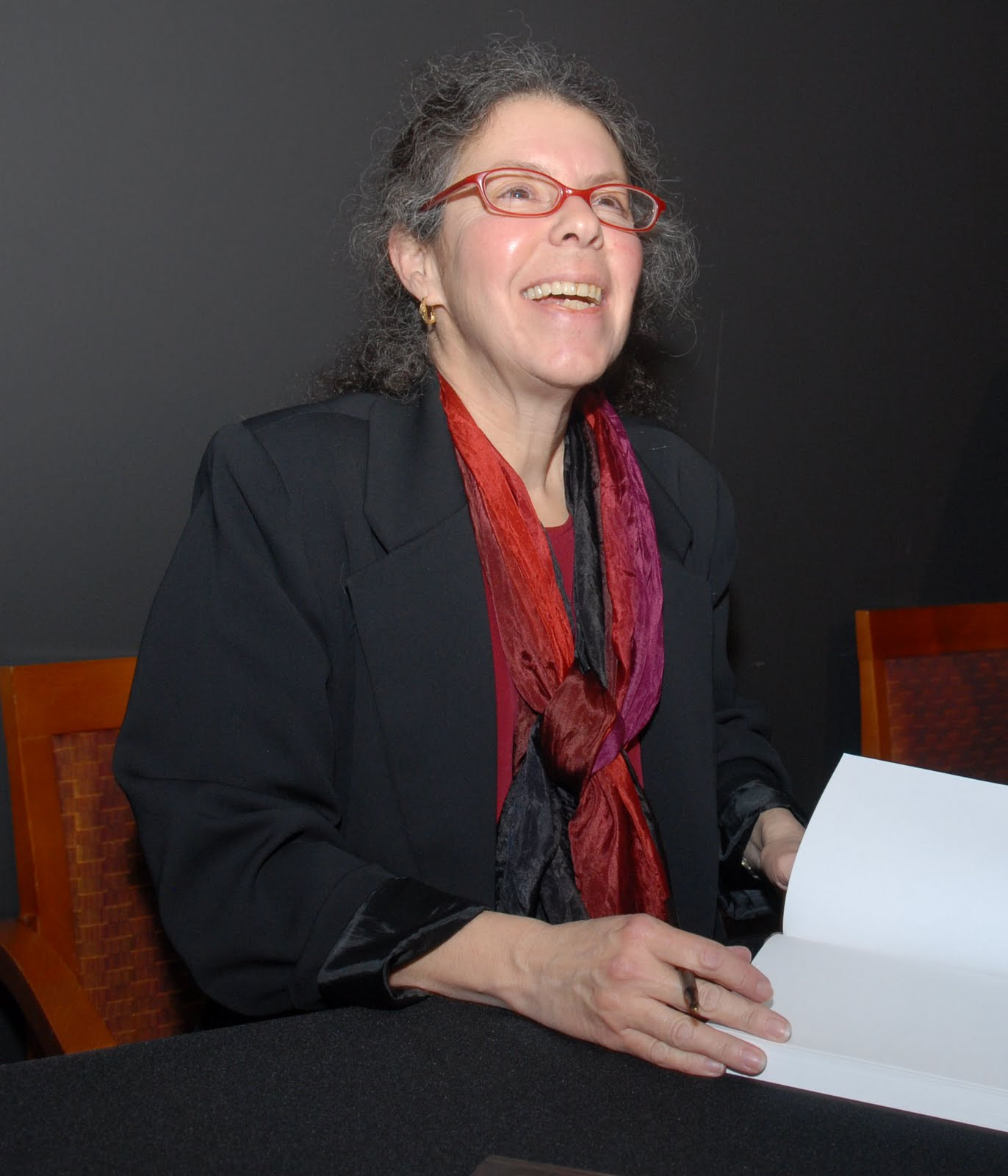
- Henry at a signing and speaking engagement at the Museum of Jewish Heritage in 2010
- Born: March 5, 1953; Pennsylvania, U.S.
- Died: March 1, 2011 (aged 57); Bergen County, New Jersey, U.S.
- Occupations: Author, columnist, journalist and Holocaust Archivist
- Writing career
- Genre: Non-fiction
- Subject: Politics

Marilyn Henry (March 5, 1953 – March 1, 2011) was an American author, columnist, journalist, historian and archivist for matters pertaining to Holocaust reparations, survivor benefits and art looted by the Nazis.

== Life and career ==
Born Marilyn Cohen, into a Jewish family in Pennsylvania, Henry, was described as a "quintessential old-school girl reporter", and a "fierce advocate" for Holocaust survivors. In 1974, Marilyn graduated from Livingston College of Rutgers University and obtained a master's degree in statistics from Pennsylvania State University. Afterward, she changed her last name to Henry. Earlier in her career, she was a reporter for the Jacksonville Times-Union and became its wire editor. After, Henry was a writer for The Jerusalem Post in Israel, and then in 1988 became its New York bureau chief when she moved back to the United States after marrying. Henry focused the latter part of her career as an advocate for Holocaust survivors and making sure that restitution was fairly distributed to the victims, instead of the myriad of agencies supporting "survivor causes". She lived until her death in Teaneck, New Jersey with her husband, Rabbi Shammai Engelmayer.

== Advocacy ==
Henry focused much of the latter part of her journalism career in advocacy for survivors of the Nazi Holocaust, but kept a neutral stance in her coverage of the myriad thorny issues involved. Beginning in the late 1990s, Henry concentrated much of her efforts on art restitution issues, writing for the Jerusalem Post and also as a contributing editor of ARTnews. She traveled around the world to review records and interview pertinent officials from various European countries, and soon became known as the preeminent scholar on the topic. She was already considered an authority on German reparations and the recovery of Jewish properties looted and displaced in Europe during the Nazi and communist eras. She also sought to pressure U.S. and Czech officials to look into the apparent murder in 1967 of Charles Jordan, a top professional of the American Jewish Joint Distribution Committee (JDC) at the time whose body was found floating in the Vltava. She also worked part-time as an archivist for the JDC.

== Death ==
Henry died from lung cancer at the Villa Marie Claire, a residential hospice of Holy Name Medical Center in Saddle River, New Jersey. She is survived by her husband of 23 years, Rabbi Shammai Engelmayer. As she faced her cancer and treatments, Henry also focused her life's ending work on the advocacy of hospice care for people suffering from terminal illness. In one of her last newspaper columns, she wrote, "Seeing no rosy future, I chose to focus on the quality of my life rather than the amount of time I might gain with treatment."

== Selected works ==
She was the author of Confronting the Perpetrators: A History of the Claims Conference (Vallentine Mitchell), with a foreword by Sir Martin Gilbert (2007), a contributor to the Encyclopedia Judaica and the American Jewish Year Book.
