= Joseph W. Molyneaux =

American judge

Senior Judge of the United States District Court for the District of Minnesota
- In office February 28, 1937 – January 24, 1940

Judge of the United States District Court for the District of Minnesota
- In office March 18, 1925 – February 28, 1937
- Appointed by: Calvin Coolidge
- Preceded by: Seat established by 43 Stat. 1098
- Succeeded by: George F. Sullivan

Personal details
- Born: Joseph West Molyneaux; December 12, 1859 Bellevue, Kentucky
- Died: January 24, 1940 (aged 80) Minneapolis, Minnesota
- Education: University of Cincinnati College of Law (LL.B.)

Joseph West Molyneaux (December 12, 1859 – January 24, 1940) was a United States district judge of the United States District Court for the District of Minnesota.

== Education and career ==
Born in Bellevue, Kentucky, Molyneaux received a Bachelor of Laws from the University of Cincinnati College of Law in 1882. He was in private practice in Minneapolis, Minnesota from 1884 to 1913. He was a Judge of the Minneapolis District Court from 1913 to 1925.

== Federal judicial service ==
On March 18, 1925, Molyneaux was nominated by President Calvin Coolidge to a new seat on the United States District Court for the District of Minnesota created by 43 Stat. 1098. He was confirmed by the United States Senate on March 18, 1925, and received his commission the same day. He was one of three U.S. district judges who granted a temporary injunction to Minnesota milling firms to prevent wheat processing tax collection after the first Agricultural Adjustment Act was passed. During the Prohibition era, he convicted bootleggers and gained a reputation as "the bootlegger's foe" for his strong sentences. Molyneaux presided over the first and second trials of Wilbur Foshay. Molyneaux assumed senior status on February 28, 1937. He served in that capacity until his death on January 24, 1940, in Minneapolis.

== Sources ==
Legal offices
Preceded by Seat established by 43 Stat. 1098	Judge of the United States District Court for the District of Minnesota; 1925–1937	Succeeded by George F. Sullivan
