= Dalkon Shield =

Discontinued intrauterine device (IUD)

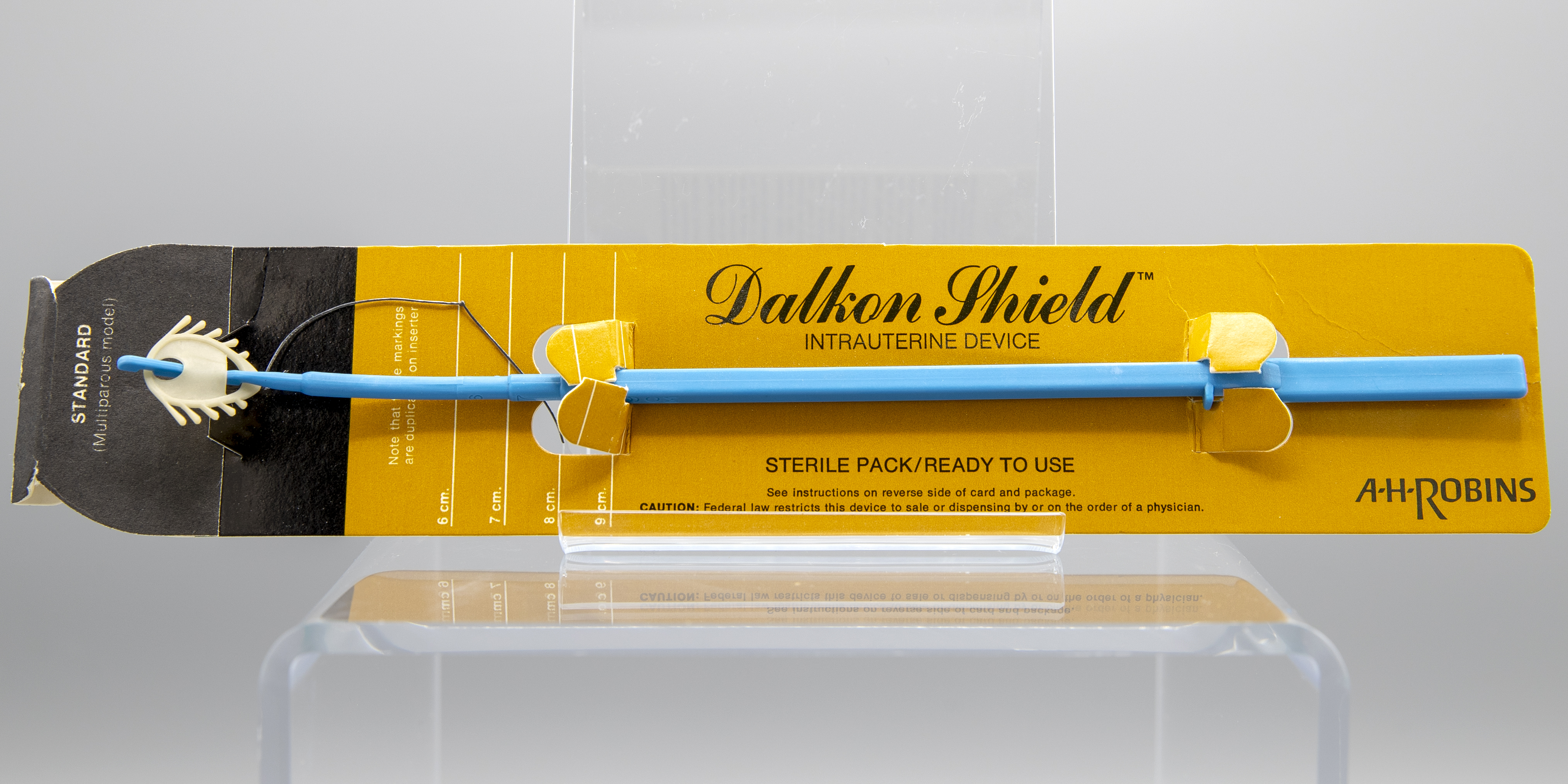
- Dalkon Shield with insertion device and packaging card

Background
- Type: Intrauterine
- First use: 1971

Failure rates (first year)
- Perfect use: ?
- Typical use: ?

Usage
- Reversibility: Reversible
- User reminders: ?

Advantages and disadvantages
- STI protection: No

The Dalkon Shield was a contraceptive intrauterine device (IUD) developed by the Dalkon Corporation and marketed by the A.H. Robins Company. First marketed in 1971, it was promoted as a safer alternative to birth control pills and was used by about 2.2 million women in the United States at its peak.

The device was associated with an increased risk of septic abortion and other severe infections, largely because its multifilament tail string could allow bacteria to pass through the cervix into the uterus. Sales were suspended in the United States in 1974 at the urging of the Food and Drug Administration, although the device continued to be marketed internationally for several years.

More than 327,000 lawsuits and claims were filed against A.H. Robins over the Dalkon Shield, making it one of the largest product-liability cases in U.S. history. The resulting litigation led the company to file for Chapter 11 bankruptcy protection in 1985 and contributed to the passage of the 1976 Medical Device Amendments, which for the first time required the U.S. Food and Drug Administration to regulate medical devices, including IUDs.

== Medical use ==
The Dalkon Shield was intended as a form of long-acting reversible contraceptive.

While testing his and Irwin Lerner's invention between 1968 and 1969, Hugh Davis reported a pregnancy rate of 1.1%, an expulsion rate of 2.3%, a retention rate of 94%, and reduced bleeding complications in 640 women who had the device inserted. However, this was later found to have numerous flaws; in the five months after the study was concluded, pregnancy rates were at 3–5%, there were not enough participants to give statistically significant results, and the average woman was enrolled for 5 months of the 12-month study; women who dropped out were not included in the results; some women were included after they had found success with the IUD, and Davis had recommended using spermicide during the most fertile days of patients' cycles.

== Adverse effects ==
The Dalkon Shield used Supramid, a cable-like suture material made of hundreds of fine inner nylon fibers encased by a smooth nylon outer sheath, as the material for the tail string. In addition to the string's ability to draw in bacteria from the non-sterile vaginal canal and transport them to the sterile uterus while bypassing the cervical mucus that acts as a barrier against infection ("wicking"), the string was also prone to deteriorating inside the body, adding additional risks and giving bacteria another avenue to enter the string.

In an attempt to mitigate this risk, a knot was tied at either end of the string, and experiments were ran to see if inky water would wick past the knot and up the string. It did not, and no further testing was done. Later, in 1971, a quality control supervisor found that the strings were able to wick water and suggested heat-sealing the ends of the string to form a barrier against wicking, but management rejected the idea as cost prohibitive.

Initial reports in the medical literature raised questions about whether the Dalkon Shield's efficacy in preventing pregnancy and expulsion rate were as good as those claimed by the manufacturer, but failed to detect the tendency of the device to cause septic abortion and other severe infections.

== Device description ==
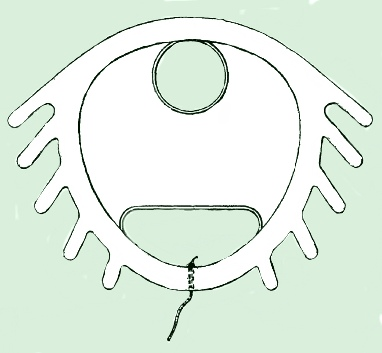
Sketch of a multiparous Dalkon Shield IUD

The Dalkon Shield consisted of a shield-shaped body made of ethylene-vinyl acetate and a tail string that used Supramid, a cable-like suture material made of hundreds of fine inner nylon fibers encased by a smooth nylon outer sheath. The body of the IUD had a closed center to mitigate the risk of strangling the intestines if it migrated to the abdomen and a row of fin-like protrusions on both sides to prevent dislodging from the uterus.

Copper sulfate was added to increase the device's radiopacity, and metallic powdered copper was added to improve the plastic's strength. The addition of copper sulfate posed a problem for A.H. Robins, since at the time the FDA was obliged to study and approve medical drugs and not devices, and although the IUD as a whole was a medical device, the copper was ruled to be a drug. To evade oversight, Robins claimed the copper sulfate was only there to help with imaging. The effectiveness of these and other changes, such as the thinning and softening of the device membrane to make extraction easier, were not studied before the device went on the market.

Two models were produced for women who had either previously given birth ("multiparous") or had not given birth ("nulliparous"). The nulliparous model was thinner and featured webbing between its fins.

== Insertion ==
The device was inserted by physicians using the provided insertion stick. Upon inserting the device into the uterine cavity, the Dalkon Shield would be released by rotating the stick at a 90º angle.

Physicians reported that the Dalkon Shield was more difficult to insert and painful than other types of IUDs, with a doctor writing to A.H. Robins in 1971 that "I have found the procedure to be the most traumatic manipulation ever perpetrated on womanhood, and I have inserted thousands of other varieties." The insertion stick additionally protruded past the end of the IUD, and physicians reported that it was easy to accidentally perforate the uterus with this tip.

== History ==
The Dalkon Shield was developed by Hugh J. Davis, a physician working as a gynecologist, and Irwin Lerner, an electrical engineer. Davis was interested in limiting the effects of overpopulation in the world, as part of the zero population growth theory popular in the 1960s.

In 1964, Davis began working with Irwin Lerner on various medical devices, and over Christmas 1967, they began work on their own IUD. The design they came up with had a closed center to mitigate the risk of strangling the intestines if it migrated to the abdomen, a large surface area made of ethylene-vinyl acetate, and two rows of fins added to prevent it from being dislodged from the uterus. However, these attributes made the device difficult to remove, resulting in the decision to use Supramid, a multifilament string encased in a nylon sheath, for the tail string.

Lerner applied for a patent alone in 1968, and Lerner, Davis, and their attorney Robert Cohen formed the Dalkon Corporation.

In February 1970, Davis's study on his Dalkon Shield was published in the American Journal of Obstetrics and Gynecology. It did not mention his status as a co-inventor, or his financial interest in the device, nor was it peer-reviewed before publication. In the time between the study's submission to the journal and its publication, several women had become pregnant, making the pregnancy rate 3-5%, worse rates compared to other IUDs and oral contraceptives on the market.

The Dalkon Corporation in 1970 gained another investor, J. Earl, M.D., a medical practitioner in Defiance, Ohio. Looking for a large retailer with marketing experience to sell their product, Earl met with a representative from A.H. Robins Company and sold them ownership rights and royalties. Robins was a pharmaceutical company but had no previous experience with birth control, nor had it made a medical device, an unregulated area at the time.

In January 1971, the Dalkon Shield went into the market, beginning in the United States and Puerto Rico, spearheaded by a large marketing campaign. At its peak, about 2.2 million women used the Dalkon Shield in the United States alone.

=== Removal from market ===
In June 1973, the Centers for Disease Control and Prevention (CDC) conducted a survey of 34,544 physicians with practices in gynecology or obstetrics regarding women who had been hospitalized or had died with complications related to the use of an IUD in the previous 6 months. A total of 16,994 physicians responded, yielding 3,502 unique case reports of women hospitalized in the first 6 months of 1973. Based on the survey response rate, the CDC estimated that a total of 7,900 IUD-related hospitalizations occurred during this 6-month period. Based on an estimate of 3.2 million IUD users, the CDC estimated an annual device-related hospitalization rate of 5 per 1000 IUD users. The survey also provided five reports of device-related fatalities, with four related to severe infections, and one case associated with the Dalkon Shield. Based on this data, the CDC estimated an IUD-related fatality rate of 3 per million users per year of use, which it compared favorably to the mortality risks associated with pregnancy and other forms of contraception. Importantly, the survey showed that the Dalkon Shield was associated with an increased rate of pregnancy-associated complications leading to hospitalization.

In June of 1974, the medical director of A.H. Robins published a letter to the editor of the British Medical Journal stating that the company was aware of an "apparent increase in the number of cases of septic abortions," including four fatalities, but claimed that there was no evidence of a correlation between wearing of the Dalkon Shield and the occurrence of septicemia. The letter recommended precautions, including pregnancy tests for women who missed their period and the immediate removal of the device for women who were found to be pregnant. That same month, A.H. Robins suspended sales of the device in the United States at the urging of the Food and Drug Administration, but continued to market and sell it internationally in countries such as Australia. In October 1974, a series of four case reports of septic pregnancies were published in the journal Obstretics and Gynecology. In 1975, the CDC published a study associating the Dalkon Shield with a higher risk of spontaneous abortion-related death compared to other IUDs.

Overseas, the Dalkon Shield continued to be marketed and sold for years after its withdrawal from the American market in 1974. In Australia, company memos informed their sales representatives of problems reported in the US, but this information was "not to be used in doctor discussions". It continued to be inserted as late as 1980.

In September 1980, the A.H. Robins Company wrote a letter to physicians recommending they remove the Dalkon Shield from women still wearing them. Newspaper, magazine, and television commercials warning people of the risks and offering to pay for the shield's removal were published by the company later in 1984.

== Litigation ==
More than 327,000 lawsuits and claims were filed against the A.H. Robins Company – the largest tort liability case since asbestos. The company's representatives argued that pelvic infections have a wide variety of causes, and that the Dalkon Shield was no more dangerous than other forms of birth control. Lawyers for the plaintiffs argued that the women they represented would be healthy and fertile today if not for the device. Scientists from the CDC stated that both arguments have merit. The federal judge, Miles W. Lord, attracted public commentary for his judgments, holding the corporate heads personally accountable, saying "Your company in the face of overwhelming evidence denies its guilt and continues its monstrous mischief. You have taken the bottom line as your guiding beacon and the low road as your route. This is corporate irresponsibility at its meanest."

Overseas and by 1989, over 7,000 Australians had sued the company in relation to pregnancies, pelvic inflammatory disease, ectopic pregnancies, spontaneous septic abortions, and perforated uteri.

The cost of litigation and settlements (estimated at billions of dollars) led the company to file for Chapter 11 bankruptcy protection in August 1985. The bankruptcy was legal but controversial at the time, as its assets were still sufficient to cover the current lawsuits and it was still making a profit, but by filing bankruptcy and creating a fixed-value trust fund for claimants, they were able to limit the damages paid. As part of the bankruptcy, a 2.5 billion-dollar trust fund was created for claimants. The share price went up following the bankruptcy, and the owners were later able to sell the A.H. Robins Company for a profit to American Home Products in 1989, with American Home Products receiving tax deductions up to about 1 billion dollars from the trust fund for victims and related to purchasing a company that has been in bankruptcy.

More than half of the women in the class action suit were paid less than $1000, although some may have been paid out as much as $1 million in the cases of babies born with birth defects.

== Legacy ==
In 1976, the Medical Device Amendments to the Food, Drug, and Cosmetic Act mandated the Food and Drug Administration, for the first time, to require testing and approval of not just medications, but also medical devices, including IUDs.

Pharmaceutical companies were discouraged from investing in IUDs after the bankruptcy of A.H. Robins, deciding that they were less profitable and more controversial than oral contraceptives. There were no IUDs on the market in the USA between 1983 and 1988, and newer IUDs remained unpopular through the 1990s, likely due to memories of the Dalkon Shield amongst both physicians and the populace.

Only 1% of American women (aged 15–44) were using IUDs in 1995, but this rate grew to 2.4% by 2004, and 14.0% by 2017, as a younger generation of women began embracing newer IUDs such as Mirena, Paragard and Gynefix as a safe, long-acting form of birth control.

== Bibliography ==
- Szaller, Jim (Winter 1999). "One Lawyer's 25 Year Journey: The Dalkon Shield Saga". Ohio Trial. 9 (4). Archived from the original (Reprint) on 2006-05-13. – Chronicles legal team of Brown & Szaller's involvement in the Dalkon Shield Litigation.
- Engelmayer, Sheldon D. (1985-09-22). "Lord's Justice : One Judge's War Against the Infamous Dalkon Shield" (New York Times Review). The New York Times. New York. ISBN 978-0-385-23051-3.
- Speroff, L.; Glass, R.H.; Kase, N.G. (1999). Clinical Gynecological Endocrinology and Infertility (6th ed.). Lippincott, Williams & Wilkins. p. 976. ISBN 978-0-683-30379-7.
- Gordon, Meryl (February 20, 1999). "A Cash Settlement, But No Apology". New York Times.
- Sivin, I. (1993). "Another look at the Dalkon Shield: meta-analysis underscores its problems". Contraception. 48 (1): 1–12. doi:10.1016/0010-7824(93)90060-k. PMID 8403900.
- Anselmi, Katherine Kaby (1994). Women's response to reproductive trauma secondary to contraceptive iatrogenesis: A phenomenological approach to the Dalkon Shield case (Thesis). pp. 1–226. Archived from the original (Abstract) on September 8, 2006.
- "Robins Plan Is Approved". New York Times. Associated Press. June 17, 1989.
- Shereff, Ruth (February 13, 1989). "How to Reward The Criminals". The Nation. 248 (6).

=== Books ===
- Bacigal, Ronald J. (1990). The Limits Of Litigation: The Dalkon Shield Controversy. Durham, N.C.: Carolina Academic Press. ISBN 0890893918.
- Cashman, Peter (1989). "The Dalkon Shield". In Grabosky, Peter; Sutton, Adam (eds.). Stains on a white collar: fourteen studies in corporate crime or corporate harm. Sydney, Australia: Federation Press. pp. 92–93. ISBN 1 86287 009 8.
- Grant, Nicole J. (1992). The Selling of contraception : the Dalkon Shield case, sexuality, and women's autonomy. Columbus: Ohio State University Press. ISBN 978-0814205723.
- Hawkins, Mary E. (1997). Unshielded: The Human Cost Of The Dalkon Shield. Toronto: University of Toronto Press. ISBN 0802008763.
- Hicks, Karen M. (1994). Surviving The Dalkon Shield Iud : Women v. The Pharmaceutical Industry. New York: Teachers College Press. ISBN 0807762717.
- Mintz, Morton (1985). At Any Cost: Corporate Greed, Women, And The Dalkon Shield. New York: Pantheon. ISBN 0394548469.
  - Abstract: Morton Mintz (January 15, 1986). "A Crime Against Women: A.H. Robins and the Dalkon Shield". Multimedia Monitor. 7 (1). – Includes full text of presiding judge Miles Lord's statement to Clairbone Robins, et al., at bottom.
  - Reviewed and summarised by: Tamar Lewin (1986-01-12). "What Standards For Corporate Crime?". New York Times.
- Perry, Susan & Dawson, Jim (1985). Nightmare: Women And The Dalkon Shield. New York: Macmillan. ISBN 0025959301.
- Stern, Gerald M. (1976). The Buffalo Creek Disaster. New York: Random House. ISBN 0394403908.
