= Rajender v. University of Minnesota =

Class action lawsuit

- Court: United States District Court for the District of Minnesota
- Full case name: Shyamala Rajender, et al. v. The University of Minnesota and the Regents of the University of Minnesota
- Decided: July 24, 1982
- Docket nos.: Civ. No. 4-73-435
- Citation: 546 F. Supp. 158

Case history
- Subsequent actions: 563 F. Supp. 401 (D. Minn. 1983), judgment rev'd in part, vacated in part, 730 F.2d 1110 (8th Cir. 1984).

Court membership
- Judge sitting: Miles Lord

Rajender v. University of Minnesota was a landmark class action lawsuit dealing with sexual discrimination at an American university. The case was filed on September 5, 1973, by Shyamala Rajender, an assistant professor of chemistry at the University of Minnesota. Rajender accused the university of engaging in employment discrimination on the basis of sex and national origin after she was turned down for a tenure-track position despite being recommended for the position by several university committees. The suit was certified as a class action by the United States District Court for the District of Minnesota on February 13, 1978. After eleven weeks of trial, the suit was settled in 1980 by a consent decree. Rajender received $100,000 and Judge Miles Lord enjoined the university from discriminating against women on the basis of sex. Rajender's attorneys were awarded approximately $2 million in fees. The suit had a lasting impact on US colleges and universities.

== See also ==
- List of class-action lawsuits
