= Dennis F. Donovan =

American judge

Senior Judge of the United States District Court for the District of Minnesota
- In office December 31, 1965 – September 16, 1974

Judge of the United States District Court for the District of Minnesota
- In office July 18, 1945 – December 31, 1965
- Appointed by: Harry S. Truman
- Preceded by: George F. Sullivan
- Succeeded by: Miles Lord

Personal details
- Born: Dennis Francis Donovan; April 9, 1889 Champion, Michigan
- Died: September 16, 1974 (aged 85) Rochester, Minnesota
- Education: University of Michigan Law School (LL.B.)

Dennis Francis Donovan (April 9, 1889 – September 16, 1974) was a United States district judge of the United States District Court for the District of Minnesota.

== Education and career ==
Born in Champion, Michigan, Donovan received a Bachelor of Laws from the University of Michigan Law School in 1913. He was in private practice in Duluth, Minnesota from 1914 to 1945.

== Federal judicial service ==
On June 1, 1945, Donovan was nominated by President Harry S. Truman to a seat on the United States District Court for the District of Minnesota vacated by Judge George F. Sullivan. Donovan was confirmed by the United States Senate on July 17, 1945, and received his commission on July 18, 1945. He assumed senior status on December 31, 1965, serving in that capacity until his death on September 16, 1974, in Rochester, Minnesota.

== Sources ==
Legal offices
Preceded by George F. Sullivan	Judge of the United States District Court for the District of Minnesota; 1945–1965	Succeeded by Miles Lord
