= St. Louis Globe-Democrat =

Daily newspaper in St. Louis, Missouri, US

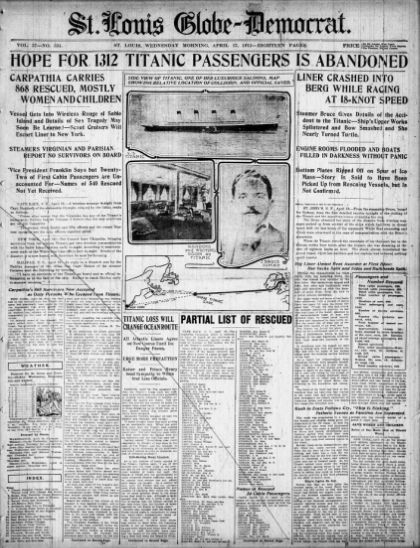
- Front page of the newspaper on April 17, 1912, reporting on the sinking of the Titanic
- Type: Daily newspaper
- Owner(s): Co-founder William McKee and his descendants (1852-1955); Newhouse Newspapers (1955-1984); Jeffrey M. Gluck (1984-1985); Veritas Corp. (1986)
- Founded: July 1, 1852
- Ceased publication: October 29, 1986
- Language: English
- Headquarters: St. Louis, Missouri
- ISSN: 2574-6642

The St. Louis Globe-Democrat was a daily print newspaper based in St. Louis, Missouri, from 1852 until 1986. The paper began operations on July 1, 1852, as The Daily Missouri Democrat, changing its name to The Missouri Democrat in 1868, then to The St. Louis Democrat in 1873. It merged with the St. Louis Globe (founded in 1872) to form the St. Louis Globe-Democrat in 1875.

In their earliest days, the predecessor newspapers which eventually merged to form the St. Louis Globe-Democrat were staunch advocates of freedom and anti-slavery in Missouri. The Globe-Democrat, colloquially called the Globe, eventually became the most widely read morning paper in St. Louis, with a huge circulation, and used this support to promote civic responsibility and great causes regarding urban improvements.

The newspaper was the morning paper for Greater St. Louis and had some competition from the evening St. Louis Post-Dispatch (created by a merger of the St. Louis Post and the St. Louis Dispatch) and the St. Louis Star-Times (created by a merger of The St. Louis Star and The St. Louis Times). The Star-Times ceased operations in 1951. The Globe-Democrat and the rival Post-Dispatch carried on an intense rivalry for three more decades, with clear and substantial philosophical differences both in news coverage (where the Globe focused heavily on local issues and the Post on national and international news) and editorial positions, where each had a national reputation—the Globe-Democrat as a strong conservative voice and the Post-Dispatch a strong liberal voice.

The animus of each paper for the other wasn’t so apparent in the business end of their operations. Following a lengthy and debilitating strike in 1959 at the Globe-Democrat, the two papers had operated under a joint operating agreement, with the protection of the Newspaper Preservation Act, which allowed two competing papers to have some joint operations free of antitrust violation, in return for which the failing paper of the two must continue operation unless it can show proof of irreversible financial losses. The Post-Dispatch, owned by the Pulitzer Publishing Company, handled all production and printing for both papers. The Globe-Democrat relinquished having an edition on Sunday, the most lucrative day for advertising and circulation revenue, since there was not press capacity to produce both the Post and Globe at the same time. Advertising was sold jointly, and profits were shared equally.

The Globe-Democrat’s competitive market position was reduced by the terms of that Joint Operating Agreement in 1959, which was expanded in 1969 and 1979. The papers shared all business and advertising functions, with only the news functions separate. Until the last fiscal year of its existence, the Post-Globe Agency, as the joint operation was known, operated in the red. The agency was said to be making a marginal profit that year.

In 1983 an agreement between the heirs of S.I. Newhouse and the St. Louis Post Dispatch to close the Globe and enter into a 50-year profit-sharing arrangement was determined by the U.S. Justice Department to be an Antitrust Act collusion, and the government required the Globe-Democrat to seek new ownership rather than summarily close the paper. (There was no requirement for the Post-Dispatch to do any of the services it had been providing under the Joint Operating Agreement, which lessened any attractiveness to prospective buyers). In early 1984 the paper was purchased by Jeffrey M. Gluck, which brought an end to all joint operations, and Gluck had to find his own printers and set up his own advertising, circulation, news, production and other departments from scratch in just a matter of weeks, something perhaps unprecedented in modern journalism history, certainly for a 250,000-circulation paper. When the change in ownership took effect on January 27, 1984, the Post-Dispatch switched to morning publication the same day, making it head-to-head competition.

In August 1986 the paper filed for Chapter 11 bankruptcy protection. At the time the newspaper listed $8 million in debts. In December the newspaper suspended publication, and the Bankruptcy Court appointed a trustee to seek new owners. In January 1986 Veritas Corporation purchased the paper for $500,000 and, after a 51-day hiatus, the paper resumed publication on January 27. Veritas, formed by businessmen John B. Prentis and William E. Franke, committed to contribute $4 million to the newspaper's operations. That did not prove sufficient, and the Globe-Democrat ended publication on October 29 after the newspaper failed to secure a necessary $15 million loan from the state of Missouri. An attorney had challenged the legality of the state's ability to grant that particular bond package, passed in the state legislature earlier that year.

== History (1852–1986) ==
The newspaper was an important voice in keeping Missouri in the Union; was praised by President Abraham Lincoln (who read the paper before his presidency) as being worth 10 regiments of troops; may have brought about Andrew Johnson becoming Lincoln's vice-president (and thus, ultimately, president); was widely read throughout the Midwest and the Western frontier (Texas papers tried to keep it from being distributed in that state due to the competition); was responsible, through its editor, of creating the American Society of Newspaper Editors; employed writers such as John Jay, Henry Morton Stanley, Theodore Dreiser and Patrick Buchanan; was a major sponsor of Charles Lindbergh's historic transatlantic flight in the Spirit of St. Louis; played a key role in getting the long-planned Gateway Arch actually built; and through its news investigations and editorial advocacy brought about numerous improvements at the local, state and even national level (an example of the latter being its series on national railroad problems that led to new federal legislation). These matters and others are discussed below.

=== 1852–1865: early years ===
What became the St. Louis Globe-Democrat was a product and beneficiary of two developments in the mid-19th century—an explosive population growth and a new technology, the telegraph. The population surge, in St. Louis as in some other cities in the United States and elsewhere, was due to such factors as immigration, the expansion of manufacturing and industry, and river transportation advances. The St. Louis population more than doubled from 77,860 in 1850 to 160,773 in 1860 and then almost doubled again to 310,860 in 1870; Until after the 1960 census, St. Louis was one of the 10 most populous cities in the United States. As for the telegraph, "It was in the city that the daily newspaper press, which spread rapidly in the wake of the telegraph after 1850, found its most habitual readers". More than a score of newspapers in the early years vied for that readership.

Before the Civil War the states and nation were divided as to whether new territories should be admitted to the Union as non-slave (free-soil) states or slave states. The predecessor newspapers which eventually merged to form the St. Louis Globe-Democrat were staunch advocates of freedom and anti-slavery in Missouri, at the time a border state with significant Southern values. Controversies with rival papers were commonplace. The first editor of the Missouri Democrat, Frank Blair, and the editor of another paper, the Union, were soon involved in a gun fight; neither was injured In 1853 the Missouri Democrat bought the Union and absorbed it. The paper increased its local news coverage without losing sight of the fact that politics was the chief purpose of the paper. In the first two years of the paper's existence, the Missouri Democrat's ownership shifted three times and had three editors who directed its political writings. Two of those editors, Blair and B. Gratz Brown, were in the Missouri Legislature; Blair was soon after elected to Congress and Brown was later a U.S. senator, Missouri governor, and vice-presidential candidate. Brown was going to engage in a horse pistol duel at ten paces in 1855 but his opponent backed out after Brown had already arrived at the dueling grounds. A year later another vitriolic Brown editorial ended in a duel with Thomas C. Reynolds, the U.S. District Attorney, fought on a sandbar in the Missouri River. Reynolds was not hurt, but Brown was severely wounded in the knee.

The issue of slavery became a primary issue in the mid-1850s across the nation and certainly in St. Louis, where slaves were sold at the courthouse and riots and political marches were not uncommon. Amid the 21 papers that were published in St. Louis at the time, views were heated. The Missouri Democrat gave a lukewarm endorsement on 1856 to James Buchanan, the Democrat candidate for president, rather than John C. Fremont, the candidate of the new Republican Party and the son-in-law of prominent free-soil politician Thomas H. Benton, one of Missouri's first two U.S. senators, whose political fortunes had been championed by the Missouri Democrat since its founding. Benton, a Democrat party loyalist to the end, opposed his son-in-law because he thought that Fremont could command only a small vote and that running him would aggravate sectional feelings, and the editors seemed to agree.

Meanwhile, there began ties between Abraham Lincoln and the Missouri Democrat stemming from the paper's Free-Soil days, when Blair and Lincoln had been in close agreement on the non-extension of slavery into territories. In 1857 Blair pledged that the paper would "bloom for Republicanism" in 1860, and Lincoln shortly after the meeting drew up an agreement, signed by him and nine other Illinois Republicans, to furnish $500 for the promotion of the Missouri Democrat in Illinois. John Hay, who was then reading law in Lincoln's office and later served as U.S. secretary of state under two presidents, became a correspondent of the Missouri Democrat, and Lincoln himself was a careful reader of the paper, sometimes scribbling notes on the margin of a copy. He used the paper to further his antislavery ideas, particularly in southern Illinois where the Missouri Democrat was gaining readers. Lincoln was probably cultivating the paper because St. Louis was a much larger and more important city than Chicago and because his connection with a metropolitan newspaper in a border state could prove an important factor in his 1860 campaign. The paper strenuously supported Lincoln in his 1858 senatorial campaign against Stephen Douglas.

By 1857 there was a split into factions between conservatives under Benton, strong in rural areas, and the editor and owners of the Missouri Democrat who were to declare openly during the year for emancipation and were devoted to the economic betterment of Missouri and the nation. The paper editorialized for eventual emancipation by colonization, suggesting that Missouri's colored people be shipped to Liberia and that slaveholders be fully compensated. By 1858 the Missouri Democrat had become the headquarters for the antislavery movement in Missouri led by Blair, who was then in Congress where he gave his famous colonization speech that proposed inquiring into the purchase of land on which colored people who were already free might be colonized. He believed that all Negroes had the right to be free and that further immigration of free people from Africa should be prohibited. The paper endorsed Blair's proposal, of course, and applied it to Missouri.

When Brown left the paper in 1859, he was succeeded as editor by the assistant editor, Peter L. Foy, who was already well known in Missouri newspaper circles. Under Foy, by the time of the 1860 presidential election the paper – already having exercised great influence in its first eight years of existence—became known as the leading Republican paper of the West. It fought hard in 1861 to keep Missouri in the Union. Its crusade for Unionism brought two mob attacks to the doors of its office; such mobbing of newspapers was not unusual in that era. President Lincoln said the paper was worth more to the North than 10 regiments of soldiers. Union regiments passing through St. Louis frequently stopped in front of the paper's office to give "three times three hurrahs". Although Lincoln and the paper had a number of differences – sometimes of degree and sometimes quite substantive – the Missouri Democrat had the distinction of being the only slave-state journal that supported Lincoln in both the 1860 and 1864 elections, and its editor at the time later attributed (with no substantiation) that Andrew Johnson's nomination in 1864 as vice president was due to his editorial. Indeed, the paper felt its promotion of Johnson in 1863 was what ultimately resulted in his succeeding to the presidency in 1865, and that Johnson showed no gratitude.

The paper backed the Radical faction of the Republican Party (headed by former editor Brown) that pushed for immediate emancipation of slaves as opposed to the Conservative faction (headed by Blair, part owner of the Missouri Democrat) who favored gradual emancipation. It began agitating in 1863 for a new state constitution that would free slaves. In January 1865 a constitutional convention was held, followed by an election ratifying the new constitution and freedom of slaves. The paper had played a major role in placing the Radicals in power, and had become nationally recognized as a Republican stronghold. In the four years of the Civil War, the paper also had become the medium of information between Congress and the West.

=== 1865–1876: post-American Civil War period ===
The Missouri Democrat continued its strong Republican stance in the post-war and Reconstruction periods. It endorsed Ulysses S. Grant for president in 1868 and, although it warred openly against Grant's high tariffs and the corrupt practices in his government, it favored the renomination of Republican Grant for reelection in 1872. Grant's opponent was Horace Greeley of the short-lived Liberal Republican Party, created in 1870, and B. Gratz Brown, then Missouri governor and former editor of the Missouri Democrat, was his running mate. Brown and Blair had gone to the Liberal Republican national convention in Cincinnati, where they made a deal to have Brown placed on the ticket with Greeley. Old affronts and differences among various past and present Missouri Democrat editors and owners sometimes made strange bedfellows or broken loyalties.

The development of the telegraph and overseas cable in the years after the Civil War resulted in increased and speedier news from far afield, and the paper also enlarged its local and state newsgathering personnel. Among hires was Henry Morton Stanley in 1867 to cover "Northwestern Missouri and Kansas and Nebraska". Stanley would later be sent by the New York Herald on the famous expedition to Africa to find Dr. David Livingston. Of significance to later development of the paper, Simeon Ray, the nephew of co-founder William McKee, was hired as a new advertising clerk, and in turn his son, E. Lansing Ray, was to become the owner until early 1955, and the publisher and editor until his death later in 1955, of what became the St. Louis Globe-Democrat, thus resulting in a 102-year lineage of ownership.

In 1872, one of the co-owners of the paper, George W. Fishback, had been at odds with the other two co-owners, William McKee and Daniel M. Houser, because he was dissatisfied with the management of their journal. McKee and Houser refused to accept Fishback's offer to buy them out and McKee would not set a price on his own interest. Fishback obtained from Circuit Court an order for a sale, whereby an equitable transaction could adjust and close the partnership. An auction was held in March 1872 and Fishback prevailed, bidding $456,100, which was $100 more than McKee's final bid. Within a few weeks of the sale, McKee and Houser began plans for establishing another paper, which would be the ninth St. Louis daily at the time. It started publication on July 18, 1872, as the St. Louis Globe, and was locked in a combination grudge match-death battle with the Missouri Democrat, despite its name the other Republican paper. Advertising in all the St. Louis papers was hard to come by due to the tight money economy of the time, but the Globe's circulation grew steadily, and it claimed in November 1873 to have the largest circulation of any St. Louis paper, while the Missouri Democrat's circulation declined. By 1874 Fishback offered to sell his paper to McKee and Houser, but the duo's editor advised against it, saying extinction (due to poor editorial leadership) was cheaper than purchase, and that the only danger was if Fishback sold his paper to someone with newspaper ability and experience. That thinking prevailed, and the competition continued until May 1875.

Then, one or both of two possibilities brought McKee and Houser to change their minds about buying the Missouri Democrat: (1) they felt conditions were right to buy the Missouri Democrat before Fishback would be forced to sell his declining paper to some capable journalist; (2) Fishback gained knowledge of McKee's full involvement in graft in what became known as the Whiskey Ring Fraud, centered in St. Louis and one of the largest scandals of the Grant administration. It involved the diversion of tax revenue in a conspiracy among government agents, politicians, whiskey distillers and distributors for various purposes (personal profit, campaign expenses, or whatever). On May 6, 1875, the Missouri Democrat published its first report of the existence of the Ring, saying there were rumors of a graft ring in St. Louis and that an investigation was underway. On May 10 the distilleries were seized. On May 11, McKee and Houser started negotiations with Fishback to buy his paper. Coincidence? A sale followed on May 12, 1875, which the Globe called a "merging of the two papers", ending three years of fierce competition and the beginning of a metropolitan paper that was to survive all but one of its contemporaries. The new name was the St. Louis Globe-Democrat with the first issue featuring the new name on May 20.

McKee was implicated in the Ring later in the year by an indicted distiller who turned state's evidence, and the November 1875 session of the Grand Jury indicted him for conspiracy to defraud the government. He was tried, and on the first ballot seven jurors voted for acquittal, but after 10 more hours of deliberation the verdict was guilty. On April 16, 1876, McKee was sentenced to two years in jail and fined $10,000. But McKee served only six months of his sentence; President Grant pardoned him and remitted his fine.

=== 1877–1900: growth ===
McKee's conviction did not dim the Globe-Democrat's future. Daily circulation by February, 1878, reached 26,792. Newspapers from Minnesota and Kentucky to Kansas praised it. It was called the best, largest, and most reliable paper in the West, and was probably unsurpassed by any paper in the country for general news. By 1879 the paper could boast of more advertising on December 21 than did the "New York Herald of that same date and 20 to 30 per cent more than any other daily newspaper in the United States of the same date", it declared.

. Soon after what was called by the Globe editor "more of a marriage than a birth", the St. Louis Globe-Democrat under the editorship of Joseph Burbridge McCullough achieved great success. An acknowledged leader in new journalistic practices and dedicated to increasing circulation, the editor extended the influence of his paper throughout Missouri, Iowa, Kansas, Illinois, Mississippi, Arkansas and Texas, where it was so widely circulated, with correspondents in all the cities and towns in Texas as part of a McCullough circulation-building stunt, that there was even an attempt by Texas newspapers, called the "Texas Boycott", in 1879 to keep the Globe-Democrat from being sold in Texas. McCullough hunted news, and when there was none he created it. One example was his publishing a public lecture on "What Catholics Believe" by the St. Louis Catholic bishop, followed by interviews with 32 other clergymen plus letters from the public. The "Great Religious Controversy" that he created ran in the paper for more than three months.

Thanks to Houser's "pay any price for news" policy, McCullough could use large amounts of telegraphed news and keep special correspondents in all parts of the country. By 1884 he could tell Globe-Democrat readers that his firm was paying "more money for the collection and transmission of telegraphic news from all parts of the world" than was paid "by any other city of the world, New York and London not excepted. Day by day the Globe-Democrat became increasingly sensational as McCullough concentrated on disasters, crime, sex, violence, the odd, the religious, the different. He was widely considered one of the nation’s best editors and trained a number of noted journalists, of which Theodore Dreiser was one, and his style of writing and editing – developing the system of interviewing public figures on timely questions, the incisive style of his editorials, his success as a gatherer of news -- was widely copied in the industry. He never married and made the newspaper his life. But, after a serious illness in 1893 and increasing other health issues and deaths of close friends, including the suicide of his closest friend, he wrote a long essay on "The Philosophy of Suicide". On December 26, 1896 he committed suicide by jumping from his bedroom window. The news of his death stunned the journalistic world; even the New York Times used the news as one of its three main stories on the front page. Another legendary editor of the paper was Casper Yost, who became editor of the paper in 1889 and later was a founder of the American Society of Newspaper Editors.

=== 1900–1929: continued growth and Great Depression ===
By the dawn of the 20th century, as St. Louis's population exploded to 575,000, making it the nation's fourth-largest city, the Globe-Democrat had two serious competitors –the afternoon St. Louis Post-Dispatch, which Joseph Pulitzer had started in 1878 after buying the bankrupt St. Louis Dispatch at auction and merging it with the St. Louis Evening Post; and the morning Missouri Republic ( dating from 1808 as the Missouri Gazette and until 1888 as the St. Louis Republican), traditionally a Democrat-allied and bitter foe for decades as well as a contender for newspaper readers. The evening Post-Dispatch started its existence far behind the Globe-Democrat, but soon exceeded it. By 1914 it reached 176,659 daily circulation, while the Globe-Democrat's was 134,671, In Sunday circulation, both papers had passed the 100,000 mark, but by 1915 the Post-Dispatch was far in the lead. As for the Republic, it started the last quarter of the 19th century with a significant circulation lead over the Globe-Democrat, soon lost it, and then regained it until 1902, thereafter falling consistently while the Globe-Democrat climbed steadily. By 1915 the Globe-Democrat daily circulation was 26,277 more and the Sunday circulation 79,083 more than the Republic, and it printed 151,280 more lines of display and classified advertising (12,607 inches) annually than the Republic. Competition from other St. Louis papers was negligible. One side note is that as late as 1916 the Globe-Democrat had the largest German-American constituency of any paper in the English language, reflecting the city's large German-born population.

The decline of the Republic from a number of miscues and poor management made its death inevitable, and in its last year the paper had lost half its circulation and was heavily in debt. On December 12, 1919 it closed, having been bought by the St. Louis Globe-Democrat in what was called an absorption and not a merger, ending one of the longest and most vituperative rivalries in the history of journalism. The Globe-Democrat became, and remained, the only morning newspaper in St. Louis. One reason it avoided possible new morning competition from Democrat-backed interests may have been that the publisher, E. Lansing Ray, assured readers after the sale that the Globe-Democrat would be "an independent Republican newspaper", and soon even the word "Republican" was dropped from his announced policy. In 1922 the following declaration was placed on its editorial pages: "The Globe-Democrat is an independent newspaper, printing the news impartially, supporting what it believes to be right and opposing what it believes to be wrong, without regard to party politics".

After absorbing the Republic, the Globe-Democrat claimed daily circulation of well over 200,000, far above that of the Post-Dispatch, with its 160,043. Ray, nephew of William McKee, a co-founder of the paper's forerunner, was 34 when he became publisher of the Globe-Democrat in 1918 as the youngest publisher of a major metropolitan daily in the United States. He had served at the paper in a variety of positions since his graduation from high school. Ray soon negotiated the purchase of a majority of the company's stock from over 50 heirs of the McKee Trust Fund, assuring that the paper could stay in his family – a heritage he could hand down to his son. It also allowed him to operate the paper without worrying about shareholder interference.

Ray told his staff he did not want the paper "dictating or lecturing" on every controversial issue, but rather to present factual news accounts and interesting, valuable editorial comment that would allow readers to make up their own minds. He was supported on this by Casper S. Yost, the paper's editorial page editor since 1889, who was nationally respected and serving as the first president of the American Society of Newspaper Editors, an organization he had recently founded that was devoted to improving the professional ethics of journalism. Ray and Yost, both somewhat idealistic, believed that newspapers were obligated to serve society; that journalists had great responsibilities to the Constitution; and that it was the solemn duty of journalism to maintain the freedom of the press. Yost would remain the editorial page editor for 46 years; he retired in 1935 but returned in 1940, dying a year later.

The paper maintained its support of Republicans, without the bombast of earlier times, and although it could hardly at that point be called a crusading paper, it conducted lively civic improvement campaigns. One such campaign was the fight for better airmail service and obtaining a modern airport. It was this interest in promoting aviation that rocketed the Globe-Democrat and its publisher into international prominence in 1927, when publisher Ray was one of the backers of aviation mail carrier Charles A. Lindbergh in his quest to fly solo across the Atlantic Ocean in a single-engine plane to prove that trans-oceanic air transportation was feasible. Lindbergh had first approached the Post-Dispatch, but the editor there said, according to Lindbergh, "To fly across the Atlantic Ocean with one pilot and a single-engine plane! We have our reputation to consider. We couldn’t possibly be associated with such a venture". Lindbergh gave the Globe-Democrat exclusive publication rights in the St. Louis area, and the New York Times bought rights to its publication elsewhere.

Ray's news and editorial changes helped to increase circulation. In 1927 he suspended publication of the Weekly Globe-Democrat, which had a circulation of 245,157 in 1925, because transportation facilities had improved so much that the daily could now serve the areas which once depended mostly on a weekly, and in 1929 the combined daily and Sunday circulation passed the half-million mark. The "Flush Twenties" brought a big boost in advertising. So taxed were the Globe-Democrat facilities by its success that the paper started plans for a new building, visited big newspaper plants all across the country, and included the best features of them in the blueprints. Despite the financial crash of 1929, the company decided to proceed "to demonstrate its faith in the community". Ground was broken for the structure, a state-of-the-art six-story building with two basements at 1133 Franklin Ave., in March 1930 and was completed in November 1931.

=== 1930–1955: Post-Great Depression and end of family ownership ===
The Depression took its toll on the Globe-Democrat, as was common to all newspapers in the 1930s. Sunday circulation dropped to 185,934, a loss of 72,065 from 1929; daily circulation dropped to 211,906 in 1935, a drop of 66,227 from 1929. Daily circulation was fairly even with that of the Post-Dispatch, but Sunday circulation was always more than 50,000 behind. The other competitor, the Star-Times, which did not publish a Sunday issue, was a less serious contender for readership, as its daily circulation peaked at 158,907 in 1940. In advertising, the Globe-Democrat's income during the Depression did not rebound as it did at the other St. Louis papers. Production costs mounted in spite of attempts at retrenchments, and the reporting staff was reduced. For 80 years the Globe-Democrat had stressed foreign news, and the 1930s was no exception. But for the first time in many years, the foreign news was not reported by special correspondents. Almost all such news came from the Associated Press.

In the 1940s, during the war years, the circulations of the morning Globe-Democrat and evening Post-Dispatch were about even, but after the war, in 1946, the Globe-Democrat outstripped its main rival by 17,126, with the "help" of the evening Star-Times climbing steadily to 192,155, presumably at the expense of the Post-Dispatch. But when the Post-Dispatch bought and absorbed its evening rival in 1951, leaving just two newspapers in St. Louis, Post-Dispatch circulation shot up to 400,218, while that of the Globe-Democrat reached only 304,623.

Advertising was also a serious problem for the Globe-Democrat in the 1940s. The encroachment of radio in the advertising field was one factor, as the two competitors operated radio stations (KSD for the Post-Dispatch and KXOX for the Star-Times) which mentioned their name every time the call letters of the stations were given, and there were opportunities for cross-advertising. The Globe-Democrat had itself dabbled in radio. About 1923, in the infancy of radio, Ray ordered equipment for a radio station, but the Post-Dispatch outmaneuvered him, acquired the equipment Ray had ordered, and opened KSD. Later the Globe-Democrat had owned 1/16th interest in KMOX, but Ray's belief that involvement with radio might compromise his newspaper prompted him to sell the paper's interest. On the other hand, Ray's son, E. Lansing Ray Jr., the assistant publisher, was intensely interest in radio, particularly FM, and after he died in 1946 the father erected a lavish Globe-Democrat Tower Building at 12th and Cole streets as something of a memorial to his son, with radio station KWGD-FM going on the air in 1948. The station went off the air the next year, as FM was then not popular, and merged with KWK, which leased the building, and the Globe-Democrat was a substantial stockholder in that station.

With the younger Ray's death in 1946 of a cerebral hemorrhage, possibly a lingering effect of a head injury received during the war, and the death or retirement of some key assistants, Ray was the only descendant of the original owners left to direct the paper and the only longtime senior leader. By 1953, Ray, nearing 70, was in poor health and no longer able to give the paper the dynamic leadership it needed or to cope with the many problems inherent in such a large organization. Nor did he have a son to whom he could relinquish some of his many responsibilities. He said that he wanted to pick his successor—someone who would permit the Globe-Democrat to remain "complete master of its destiny, someone who would carry on the policies of his family".

=== 1955–1970: ownership under Samuel Irving Newhouse Sr. ===
Two years later, in 1955, Ray found the successor owner he was seeking in Samuel Irving Newhouse Sr., who then owned 10 other newspapers in four states. His company, then called Newhouse Newspapers, later became Advance Publications and involve other types of media, and is still wholly family owned. Newhouse had a reputation of allowing local publishers and editors a very considerable autonomy. In March 1955, Ray sold the paper for $6,250,000, which included 23% of the stock of KWK, Inc., by then both a radio and television operation; Newhouse assumed a $1,500,000 debt on the television station.

After the sale of the paper, Ray's health continued to fail for the next five months, and on August 30, 1955, his 71st birthday, Ray died. For nearly half a century he had dominated the Globe-Democrat. Following his death, Newhouse brought in Richard H. Amberg to become publisher. At the time of his appointment he was publisher of the Syracuse Post-Standard, another Newhouse paper. A graduate of Harvard, he had previously served as general manager of Newsday; administrative assistant at the New York Herald-Tribune, and editor and publisher of the Blizzard in Oil City, Pa. His years of experience had given birth to a journalistic philosophy that was to revitalize the Globe- Democrat. The new publisher told his staff that the paper was to be a fighter for the right. It would take sides on every issue; it would never run away from battle. "We will try", he said, "to make a newspaper in the best interests of the community. We will be FOR St. Louis". A good newspaper, Amberg believed, should emphasize "constructive news, news analysis, and news treatment". He liked to point out that three of the great newspapers in the Midwest could be compared to baseball teams. The Chicago Tribune played a fine game in right field, and the Post-Dispatch played a good game in left field, "albeit occasionally over the foul line", but the proper place for the Globe-Democrat should be as "a good hard-hitting center fielder". The analogy pointed out what guided the paper after Ray's death – to battle for St. Louis, to give emphasis to crusades on the local and statewide level, and, as he had said, to place great emphasis on constructive news, news analysis, and news treatment. To help make this philosophy an actuality, a new position was created – that of executive editor in charge of the news department – and Charles E. Pierson, who was managing editor at the Pittsburgh Press, was brought in as managing editor. Amberg and Pierson took up the task of rebuilding the Globe-Democrat into the forceful journalistic leader that the new publisher envisioned.

When Amberg came to St. Louis the paper had eight right-wing conservative columnists. To give readers a more "complete spectrum of columnar opinion", he dropped all but two of them, replacing them with more diverse voices. The editorial page once again began taking on controversial positions, often in advance of its competitor, no longer waiting for the Post-Dispatch to take a stand. Editorials became more forceful, Amberg himself often writing the lead editorial. Political endorsements for state and local offices in Missouri and Illinois were given to both Republican and Democrat candidates depending upon who seemed best qualified – a far cry from a century earlier when founder McKee pledged his paper to the Republican Party.

The paper also boosted its local coverage and evinced a vigorous, effective leadership in community, state and national affairs by giving big play to public projects. In 1958 the Globe-Democrat was given the 10th annual Inland Press Association award for outstanding community service for a wide variety of community projects. Some 20 projects were cited, among them: Editorials and articles promoting passage of a bill allowing the funds of Missouri to draw interest (adding millions of dollars to the treasury); a series of news stories and articles that resulted in better airline service for St. Louis; a front-page editorial and rotogravure section that brought $102,000 in contributions for the world's first heart-lung machine for St. Louis Children's Hospital, saving babies’ lives; and a series showing how other cities solved problems in attracting new industries. Other projects included a series on railroad problems that caused Sen. George Smathers of Florida to say that the paper had more to do than any other force in creating the sympathetic approach which Congress and the White House took on this issue; and stimulating interest in community welfare through its annual Women of Achievement Awards, Man of the Year Award and, to state officials, Meritorious Public Service Award. The Inland Press Association also gave the Globe-Democrat honorable mention for its outstanding coverage of city, state, and federal affairs.

Almost every issue at the time and for years thereafter gave evidence that the paper was the crusading Globe-Democrat of old. Getting aldermen ousted who did not live in the district they represented; leading a bruising campaign to allow branch banking in Missouri; warning of speed traps; and exposing police involvement in a gambling operation were among many examples of the Globe-Democrat's vigor.

The women's section was greatly enhanced; Amberg noticed that too many of his papers were being bought by men on their way to work instead of being delivered to the homes where women would have the opportunity to read them. New features and articles appealing to women were added, and the paper began sponsoring two big fashion shows each year and a "Modern Living Show" each September. The display of home furnishings and equipment was soon drawing more than 200,000 people. The women's section soon gained the same excellence that the sports and financial sections of the paper always had, and home delivered circulation by 1960 increased 60,000 over the past five years.

News coverage had improved so much that by early 1959 the paper could challenge the Post-Dispatch for leadership. When Newhouse bought the paper in March 1955, the Globe-Democrat trailed the Post-Dispatch by nearly 100,000 circulation both daily and Sunday. By September 1958, the quarterly Audit Bureau of Circulations report showed that the Globe-Democrat had gained 44,000 readers and the Post had lost 17,000. Advertising gains were also substantial; in 1958 the Globe-Democrat gained more advertising linage than any other paper in the country's biggest markets. From January 1, 1956 to November 30, 1958 advertising had gained 2,703,505 lines while the Post-Dispatch had lost 1,547,288. It was still far from overtaking its rival, but it was beginning to challenge and the trend was in the right direction.

But on February 21, 1959, catastrophe struck when the 332 employee members of the American Newspaper Guild walked out, although their contract did not end until December 31 of that year. The Globe-Democrat had to cease publication, and its 665 other employees were idled. The Guild wanted a funded pension plan "comparable" to that of the Pulitzer Publishing Co., owner of the Post-Dispatch. The Globe-Democrat noted that the Guild had repeatedly in the past praised its policy, set up by Ray, of paying pensions to retired employees out of current earnings, along with its continuing full payments on their life and health insurance. Amberg explained that 11 other unions with which the company had contracts, some of which dated back almost a century, had cooperated with the company in a "healthy system of give and take". Only the Guild, he said, with pay scales already the highest in the nation, had refused to make any concessions. The paper offered to deposit sums into a jointly administered bank account and to negotiate in the remaining 10 months of the Guild contract, but said it could not immediately do financially what the Guild demanded. One week after the walk-out started a dramatic development came: It was announced that the Post-Dispatch had bought the building and printing equipment of the Globe-Democrat and would print the Newhouse paper under contract after the strike was settled. Ownership of the two papers and direction of their news, editorial, advertising and circulation policies would remain separate. The Globe-Democrat would seek new office space and its Sunday edition would be converted into a weekend package. The contract printing arrangement was unusual in certain aspects, but it followed a national trend, dictated by rising costs, of using one set of presses to print morning and afternoon papers. Amberg said the new arrangement was made necessary by the demands of the Guild, explaining that even the Guild's third and least expensive proposal would cost the newspaper approximately $550,000 a year for 20 years – more profit than the paper made any year since the boom days of the war, and he saw no prospects for making that much. Newhouse said the Guild's insistence on a funded pension plan meant "we had no choice. They had a gun at our heads".

The sale of the building and joint printing brought about another issue. Management asked that it be given freedom to discharge personnel not needed under the changed production system, but the Guild refused to accept the proposal because it considered that job security was at stake. An assortment of leaders offered mediation services in hopes that the Globe-Democrat could resume publication. These ranged from Missouri Gov. James Blair, several legislative leaders, and Harold Gibbons, right-hand man to Teamster Union President James Hoffa, to Archbishop Joseph E. Ritter, whose appeal, it was said, brought about the talks that resulted in eventual agreement. During this period Amberg negotiated a 10-year lease with the International Shoe Co. for the Terminal Railroad Building, located just a block and a half away from the old Globe-Democrat building. Tubes and a conveyor system would link it with the printing plant in the building the Post-Dispatch had bought.

On June 1, 1959, after a 99-day shutdown, the Globe-Democrat published again, with a screaming headline, "We’re Back!" In an editorial, which also was used as a double-page paid advertisement in the June 6, 1959 issue of the trade magazine Editor and Publisher, Amberg reviewed the strike and declared that, in the end, the new plan was "no better in any single respect than past practices" and that in at least three important matters it provided less benefits. The Guild, in its own two-page ad in the magazine on June 20, denied many of Amberg's claims. But Amberg's statement that nobody ever won a strike that lasted as long as this one was painfully true: The Globe-Democrat lost an estimated $5,000,000 in revenue; the workers lost an estimated $600,000 in salaries; and there was an incalculable long-term loss in subscribers and advertisers. The Post-Dispatched benefited greatly. In March alone its advertising increased by a million lines, its daily circulation by 60,000, and its Sunday circulation by 150,000.

One indication of reader and advertiser loyalty was that in the first week of publication after the strike the daily run was over 330,000, advertisers flocked back, and Amberg declared hopefully that he anticipated pre-strike normalcy within two weeks. But before the two weeks were up, another strike caused both papers to cease publication when on June 10 the 44 stereotypers at the Post-Dispatch walked out. That strike terminated two weeks later and the Globe-Democrat took up where it had left off. By July 1960, total advertising exceeded that of the year before, and circulation had climbed to 340,914, an all-time high, whereas it had been 334,240 before the 99-day shutdown and 309,943 in the three-month period after it.

The Globe-Democrat and Post-Dispatch maintained a vigorous news and philosophical competition that attracted a large portion of national attention and extensive articles, including mass media such as Time and Newsweek.

Still, it would take almost two more decades before the Globe-Democrat could overtake the Post-Dispatch in daily circulation. It never could come close in the lucrative Sunday circulation market, and due to the joint printing agreement the presses were only able to print the Sunday Post-Dispatch due to capacity limits, and the Globe-Democrat switched from Sunday to a Saturday weekend edition, which greatly hamstrung its allure to some readers and advertisers, in turn affecting circulation and advertising.

The newspaper always was in the upper tier of American newspapers in its news and editorial reporting. In 1952 editorial page editor Louis LaCoss won a Pulitzer Prize for Editorial Writing for the editorial "Low Estate of Public Morals", and in 1969 the paper won a second Pulitzer for exposing corruption in the Pipefitters Union. Other awards and national honors came for exposing arson for profit, traffic court corruption, poor conditions in residential neighborhoods, the fundraising conduct of some charitable organizations, and highway safety perils; getting the state to have to put its funds in interest-bearing accounts; and for outstanding reporting of government news, to cite a few examples. Its extensive community involvement included an annual "Old Newsboys Day" special edition sold by volunteers on street corners that raised millions of dollars over a quarter-century for area charities, with the Globe-Democrat paying all costs of producing and distributing the edition. The paper once ranked for five straight years in the top 10 newspapers in the country in public service awards at the Associated Press Managing Editors’ (APME) convention.

The Globe-Democrat on February 5, 1956 began the first of a series of articles explaining the need for carrying out construction of the Jefferson National Expansion Memorial, which President Franklin Roosevelt had approved by executive order in 1935, allocating the 82-acre area as the first National Historic Site. The first article was accompanied by an editorial written by Amberg calling for the inclusion in the memorial of the "Saarinen arch", designed by Eero Saarinen in 1947 but which was not in the plan. The strong push the paper provided in the years that followed, along with mobilization of Missouri and Illinois members of Congress, led to congressional approval of the memorial and on October 28, 1965, the dedication of the world-famous Gateway Arch.

In 1967 Amberg died at age 55 of a heart attack. His death drew national attention in newspapers and magazines. He was succeeded by G. Duncan Bauman, who had been the paper's business manager, and who carried on virtually all of the policies and programs of his predecessor. The Globe-Democrat remained staunchly conservative, locally focused, and community-oriented, in sharp contrast to the Post-Dispatch, which was staunchly liberal, nationally and internationally focused, and by policy aloof from community involvement.

=== 1971–1984: joint operation ===
Economic and demographic changes in the second half of the 20th century affected newspapers in circulation and advertising. With the rush to the suburbs, St. Louis population plunged from its peak of 880,000 in the early fifties to 622,000 in 1970, while between 1948 and 1972 the city lost almost 6,000 retail businesses and 900 manufacturing establishments. The rise of television news and daytime traffic were factors that hindered afternoon newspapers, and many across the country closed or merged with morning papers. As the morning paper in St. Louis, the Globe-Democrat benefited from the trend, but both it and the afternoon Post-Dispatch faced financial pressures. By the 1980s two suburban newspaper publishers combined to form Suburban Newspapers of Greater St. Louis and distributed 820,000 free papers, or shoppers, serving many suburban areas around St. Louis and, in the process, capturing a good portion of the lucrative national advertising of both papers. Other media also made inroads in advertising and viewership/readership.

The same pressures nationally led to newspaper publishers, pointing out the importance of newspapers to a democracy and the First Amendment's guarantee of press freedom, to persuade Congress in 1971 to pass the Newspaper Preservation Act (also known as the Failing Newspaper Act). It allowed two daily newspapers in a city to form what are called Joint Operating Agreements (JOAs) to keep the weaker newspaper from going out of business. It thus sanctioned creation of business monopolies, formerly prohibited by antitrust laws, allowing competing newspapers to pool profits and market allocations and to fix prices.

As soon as the law passed, one of the first JOAs announced was between the owners of the Globe-Democrat and Post-Dispatch, with the Globe-Democrat designated as the "failing" newspaper although, except for the advantage enjoyed by the Post-Dispatch in having the only Sunday edition, the designation might be applicable to either paper. To some observers, the JOA seemed to make legal what had been a secret agreement between the two papers since the end of the 1959 strike at the Globe-Democrat. The St. Louis Journalism Review had reported details of the business agreement between the two newspapers in its inaugural issue in 1970.

In August 1979 Samuel I. Newhouse, who had bought the Globe-Democrat in 1955 and was the founder and head of Newhouse Newspapers, died after several years of declining health, during which he had turned over management of his company to his two sons, who had been involved in the business all their adult lives. Any determination to maintain a degree of independence for the organization's St. Louis paper seemed to die with the father's death. In November the merger of business operations was extended to include advertising and circulation, with the Post-Dispatch handling both functions, leaving the Globe-Democrat with only its own news department. The paper continued to fiercely battle its rival in news and for readership, including adding a new Illinois Edition in 1978 with a reporting staff of 18 focused exclusively on Illinois news. Globe-Democrat personnel were ecstatic that in the late ‘70s the paper surpassed the Post-Dispatch in daily circulation.

The September 30, 1983 daily circulation of the Globe-Democrat – the last before a fateful announcement in November—was 255,141, 34th among American newspapers, while the Post-Dispatch daily circulation was 230,025, 41st among newspapers. (The Sunday Post-Dispatch with 454,565 circulation continued its wide lead over the Weekend Globe-Democrat published on Saturdays, 243,498 circulation). However, neither paper was booming financially. The Post-Globe agency, as the joint operation was known, operated in the red each year but one from 1979 to 1983. The financial details were unknown to the staff and public, so it was a shock to the newspaper's remaining staff when publisher Bauman called a hastily arranged meeting late on the afternoon of November 7, 1983 and announced that the Globe-Democrat would shut down on December 31. It was also a shock to the whole St. Louis area, which expressed outrage.

Newhouse Newspapers presumably warned the Post-Dispatch in advance, because that paper almost simultaneously announced that it would be shifting from afternoon to morning publication early in the new year. In return for closing, the Post-Dispatch agreed to share its profits with the Globe-Democrat owners for the next 50 years, with a series of 30-year renewal options that could take the profit-sharing to beyond the year 2100. Joseph Pulitzer Jr., editor and publisher of the Post-Dispatch since 1955 (and the third Joseph Pulitzer to own and run the paper) was known to be determined to maintain his newspaper in the family and keep it locally operated, and Pulitzer owned extensive facilities. The Globe-Democrat, on the other hand, rented much of its facilities and had relatively little overhead. Its owner, Newhouse Newspapers, by then the second largest newspaper chain in the country (and now titled Advance Publications), was a non-local entity that had substantial magazine and broadcast operations elsewhere, and – with the death of its newspaper-loving founder – lacked the particular attachment to newspapers that S.I. Newhouse had. The closing of the Globe-Democrat, leaving the field to the Post-Dispatch and splitting the resulting profits, reflected reasons both financial and emotional that gave each partner what it most valued.

The announced closing immediately got the attention of the U.S. Justice Department, which the very next day initiated an investigation into the "prospective termination of publication". The Antitrust Division noted the profit-pooling, joint production, and joint printing of the two papers since 1961 and the combined business, advertising and circulation departments since 1979. It pointed out that the purpose of the Newspaper Preservation Act was to save competing newspapers, not to let one partner to a JOA be killed off. The division said it would explore the possibility of alternative purchasers over the next 15 days, and said "expressions of substantial interest and statements of qualifications" will be sought during this period. It informed the Globe-Democrat’s owner (technically the Herald Co., a subdivision of Newhouse, which itself later was to become the Advance Co.), that it must try hard to find a buyer that would keep the Globe-Democrat alive.

So the December 31 deadline was dropped and the paper continued to publish into 1984 as it sought a buyer. No newspaper chain evidently was interested – after all, any purchase came without presses (and no possibility of printing at the Post-Dispatch because it was going to become a morning newspaper), with the need to largely create a new staff since many existing staffers were by that point either hired away by the Post-Dispatch or took buyouts offered by the Globe-Democrat (with a one-year non-compete clause) and left for other jobs due to the uncertainties involved during this period. But four individuals were interested. On December 23, 1983, one of them, Jeffrey M. Gluck signed a contract to buy the paper, but labor issues with the local Globe-Democrat Guild resulted in delaying final consummation until January 12, 1984.

During the period when the time when the Globe-Democrat’s death seemed a foregone conclusion, the former lead columnist of the Post-Dispatch wrote a column in a local magazine that captured well "the essential difference between the Globe and the Post all the way down to the final days – immersion vs. isolation in the local community". Noting his 16 years with the Teamsters Union and 11 years as a Post columnist, Jake McCarthy said, "I discovered that the people at the Globe talked with the community. At the Post they talked to it". He said the "Globe remained as down home as a country weekly, and the Post, though it now and then espoused the cause of the underclass, remained as haughty and patrician as the keeper of an Ivy League library". While, he said, "the Globe remained an open door to the community", he said "(t)he Post has always tried to make the case that a newspaper should be detached from the community it reports upon".

=== 1984–1985: ownership under Jeffery M. Gluck ===
Jeffrey M. Gluck, a 30-year-old entrepreneur from Columbia, Mo., owned three small magazines – Family Journal, Missouri Life, and the second iteration of Saturday Review—but had no metropolitan newspaper experience. The purchase price was believed to be about $500.000 with a $50,000 down payment according to the Washington Post. A new date for the Newhouse chain to cease its publication of the Globe-Democrat was set for Saturday, February 25, 1984, with Gluck taking over for the next scheduled publication date, Monday, February 27.

Gluck was able, in little over a month from the time he bought the paper to the time he first had to print it, to obtain printing at three different commercial production facilities in the region; lease video display terminals for staff to write and compose content; create new advertising, circulation, production, financial and administrative staffs (functions that were done by the Post-Dispatch under the so-called Agency Agreement between the two papers); and assemble a reporting staff that included the remnant of Globe-Democrat employees who had remained and a number of new staffers to fill in holes. Despite many skeptics, the Globe-Democrat published a full newspaper from the first day of the new ownership.

Gluck, who developed a reputation for being not just entrepreneurial but impetuous, on short notice to staff even created an afternoon companion to the Globe-Democrat now that the Post-Dispatch had switched to mornings. The St. Louis Evening News began publication as a Monday-Friday paper on April 30. It had a target of achieving 50,000 readers who preferred an afternoon paper, and Gluck hoped to achieve advertising synergies and be a complement to the morning paper. Despite heavy marketing and 50,000 copies given away in the first two weeks, readership only achieved half the initial goal and advertising was weak. The evening start-up was folded on May 30 after 22 days of publication. Meanwhile, the morning Globe-Democrat maintained its six-day publication schedule.

Advertising and circulation continued to slip as Goliath pounced on David. Another threat—to both dailies—was the highly successful Suburban Newspapers of Greater St. Louis chain, which published 33 free weeklies with a reach of 800,000 in St. Louis and its suburbs. Ralph Ingersoll II, head of Ingersoll Publications, which owned 26 daily newspapers and 60 weekly magazines in 14 states, had bought Suburban Newspapers in 1984 and thereafter purchased interest in several dailies in Illinois towns around St. Louis, creating a bigger ring around St. Louis totaling almost 900,000 circulation; his investment, Ingersoll said, totaled almost $100 million. In response, Gluck on May 5, 1985 added a free Sunday edition to the existing paid editions on the other six days. It was the paper’s first Sunday edition since sale of the production facilities to the Post-Dispatch in 1959. This version was delivered on a rotating basis to homes to provide total market coverage to advertisers and increase interest in readership of the Globe-Democrat.

In mid-August Gluck announced that he planned to launch in mid-September another free edition, a Thursday edition to 100,000 non-subscribing households, containing slightly less content than the paid Thursday edition. But by then his financial resources, always suspect and occasionally causing conspicuous public problems, became a critical problem. Thousands of employee paychecks were bouncing, five top editors were forced to resign, air-conditioning was turned off to save money, and suppliers were not being paid, and on September 26 – one day before the bankruptcy court was to hear a suit by 14 current and ex-employees of the paper seeking to force it into involuntary bankruptcy —the paper filed for Chapter 11 bankruptcy protection. A number of suits were filed, and investors were sought. At the time the newspaper listed $8 million in debts. A deal to buy the Globe-Democrat fell apart, and a U.S. Bankruptcy Court judge announced on December 6, 1985, that he hoped to appoint a trustee to manage the paper’s financial affairs within a few days, whereupon the Globe-Democrat’s attorney announced its suspension, since the paper had been told by its creditor that its line of credit would be temporarily severed if the judge appointed a trustee.

=== 1986: ownership under the Veritas Corporation and end of publication ===
The paper went into hiatus under a trustee until January 1986 when Veritas Corporation purchased the paper for $500,000 plus another $175,000 in obligations it assumed. Formed by local businessmen William E. Franke III and John B. Prentis, Veritas committed to contribute $4 million to the newspaper's operations.

The paper restarted on January 27, 1986 after a 51-day hiatus and hope sprang anew. Franke, 41, the chairman and principal owner of Veritas, was a decorated Navy swift boat commander during the Vietnam War, attorney, real estate investor and had other ventures. He was not involved in day-to-day operations. His partner, Prentis, 48, was a Yale graduate, banker, founder of a sports equipment company, and became the paper’s publisher. Both had been involved in Republican politics, and the Globe-Democrat continued its conservative, pro-St. Louis stance that had marked it from its founding. Every bill was paid and financial obligation met, but it became clear to the new owners after a period of months that they needed financial help to continue. Like Gluck, they had bought a newspaper that had no production facilities of its own and had the deck seemingly stacked against it. Also like Gluck, they turned out to be undercapitalized and perhaps a bit too over-reliant on expectations that didn’t materialize, Circulation and advertising dipped further while the competition gained share. Prentis acknowledged that the paper was losing money, and new investors were sought, to no avail.

The Missouri Legislature had created a bond package earlier in 1986 that the newspaper attempted to utilize to secure a necessary $15 million loan from the state, mainly to enable building its own production facility within a year. But an attorney challenged the legality of the state's ability to grant that particular bond package and the loan was blocked. When the loan failed, the Globe-Democrat carried out what it said it would have to do, as it no longer could afford to lose money – it folded that afternoon, October 29, 1986, without even printing a final edition of farewell.

Thus in the three final, often chaotic years, three owners announced the closing of the same paper. The various plot lines – the propriety of Joint Operating Agreements (especially as carried out by the Newhouse and Pulitzer companies), the efforts by various individuals of relatively limited means to save the Globe-Democrat, the heroics of the employees at the paper, the financial difficulties, the overwhelming advantages of competitors, the impact of the fight upon other newspapers in possibly similar situations across the country, et al – made for much national scrutiny, as well as local. The Post-Dispatch became the sole St. Louis newspaper, except for a period in 1989 when Ingersoll, by then owner of America’s 12th largest newspaper chain, announced the start of a new morning tabloid newspaper, the St. Louis Sun. It died after a seven-month run, on April 25, 1990, leaving the Post-Dispatch again as a monopoly.

On May 1, 2000, the Pulitzer Co. bought itself out of 95% of its burdensome profit-sharing agreement with the Newhouse chain for $360 million. That sum surely covered far more than any losses the Globe-Democrat may have accrued since its purchase by Newhouse in 1955 for $6.25 million, and assured the Newhouse organization that the Globe-Democrat was a great financial success, in death if not in life.

Years after the newspaper ceased operations in 1986, when the trademark registration on the St. Louis Globe-Democrat name expired, it was then used for about a dozen years as the time of an unrelated free historically themed periodical.

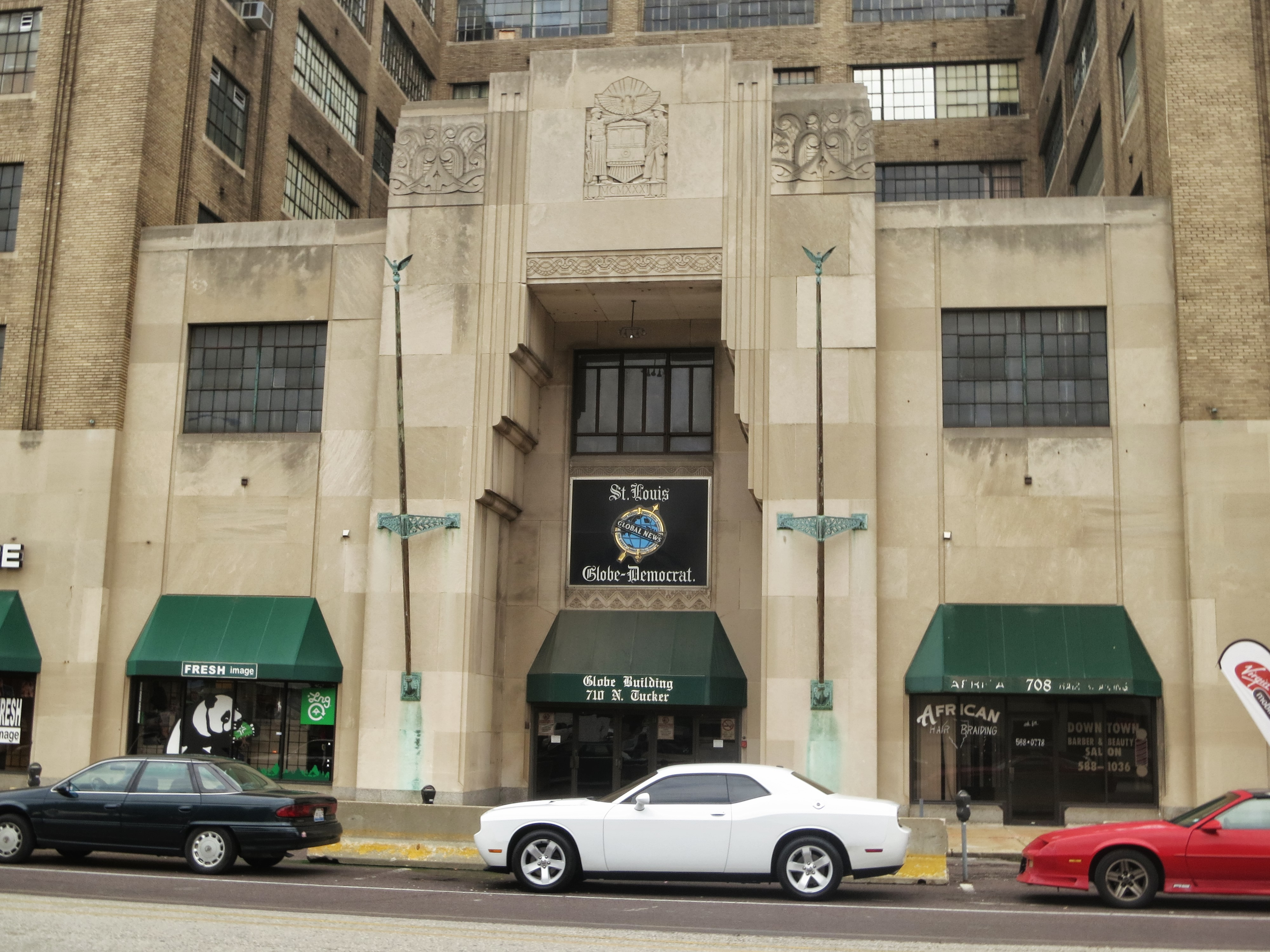
The entrance to the Globe-Democrat Building, by then simply the Globe Building, in 2012

The Globe-Democrat Building at 710 N Tucker Blvd, now known simply as the Globe Building in downtown St. Louis is still used for offices and data centers by various businesses and organizations on a rental basis. This building was built in 1931 and designed by St. Louis firm Mauran, Russell & Crowell. Some elements of the building were preserved by the National Building Arts Center.

The Globe-Democrat's 10,000,000 documents of articles and photographs from its morgue are housed in the St. Louis Mercantile Library at the University of Missouri–St. Louis (UMSL).

Notable people

- James Redpath, writer and abolitionist
- John Jay, correspondent and later U.S. Secretary of State
- Henry Morton Stanley, reporter and adventurer
- Theodore Dreiser, reporter
- Patrick Buchanan, editorial writer, later to become a presidential candidate
- Rose Marion Boylan (ca. 1875–1947), feature writer
- Rosa Kershaw Walker (ca. 1870s-1880s), society section writer
- Casper Yost, editor and founder of the American Society of Newspaper Editors
