= George F. Sullivan =

American judge

Judge of the United States District Court for the District of Minnesota
- In office August 20, 1937 – April 14, 1944
- Appointed by: Franklin D. Roosevelt
- Preceded by: Joseph W. Molyneaux
- Succeeded by: Dennis F. Donovan

Personal details
- Born: George F. Sullivan; January 30, 1886 Shakopee, Minnesota
- Died: April 14, 1944 (aged 58)
- Education: University of Minnesota Law School (LL.B.)

George F. Sullivan (January 30, 1886 – April 14, 1944) was a United States district judge of the United States District Court for the District of Minnesota.

== Education and career ==
Born in Shakopee, Minnesota, Sullivan received a Bachelor of Laws from the University of Minnesota Law School in 1908. He was in private practice in Jordan, Minnesota from 1908 to 1933. He was county attorney of Scott County, Minnesota from 1913 to 1923. He was the United States Attorney for the District of Minnesota from 1933 to 1937.

== Federal judicial service ==
On August 12, 1937, Sullivan was nominated by President Franklin D. Roosevelt to a seat on the United States District Court for the District of Minnesota vacated by Judge Joseph W. Molyneaux. Sullivan was confirmed by the United States Senate on August 17, 1937, and received his commission on August 20, 1937, serving in that capacity until his death on April 14, 1944.

== Sources ==
Legal offices
Preceded by Joseph W. Molyneaux	Judge of the United States District Court for the District of Minnesota; 1937–1944	Succeeded by Dennis F. Donovan
