= Globe Building (St. Louis) =

Historic building in Missouri, U.S.

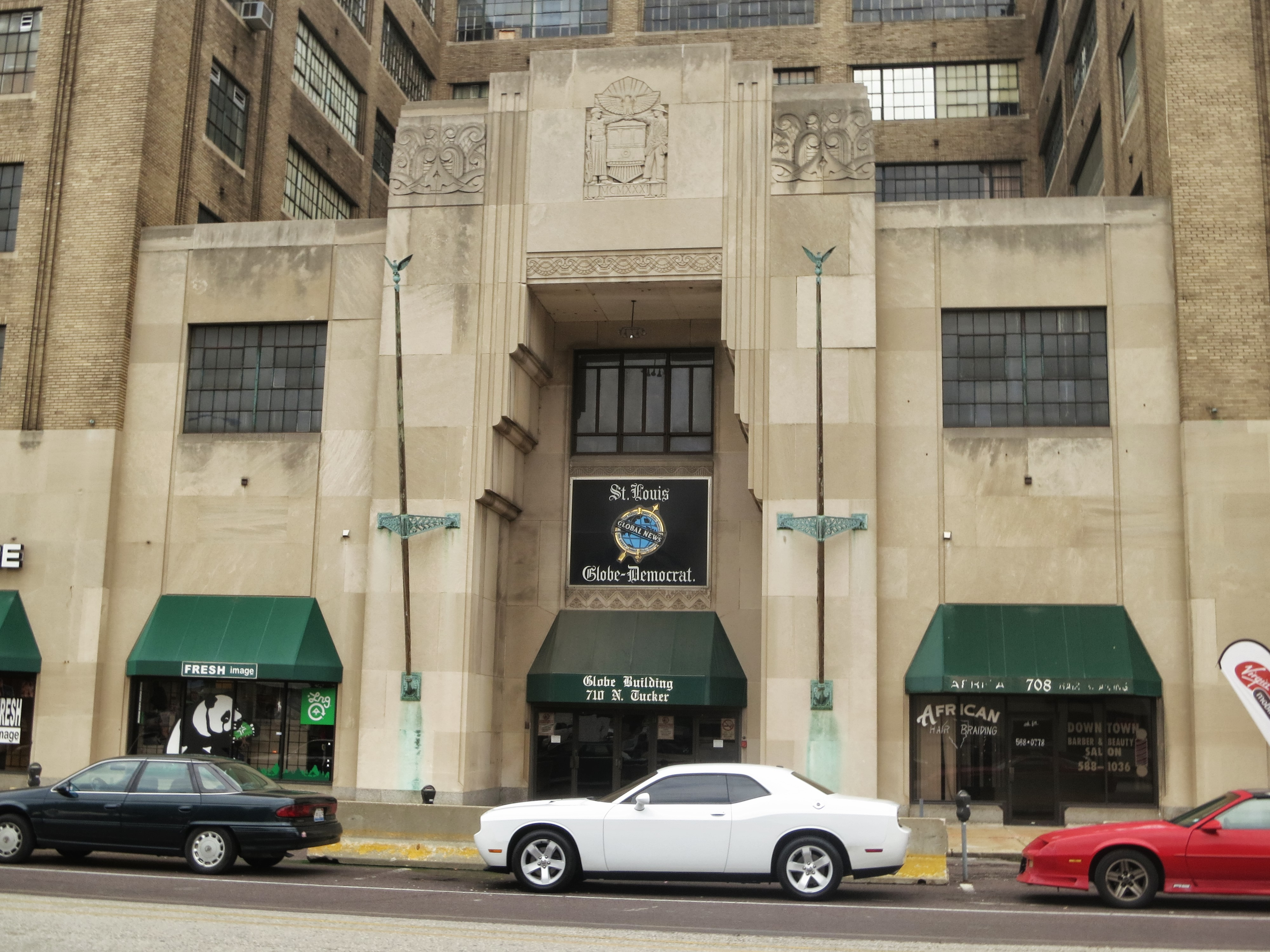
- Main entrance in 2012, building since further remodeled
- Interactive map of the Globe Building area
- Former names: Globe-Democrat Building; Midwest Terminal Building; Illinois Terminal System Building

General information
- Status: Completed, operational
- Type: Office and data center
- Architectural style: Art Deco and industrial Modernism Movement
- Location: 710 N Tucker Blvd, St. Louis, United States
- Coordinates: 38.6326°N 90.1957°W
- Construction started: 1931
- Completed: 1932

Height
- Height: 166 feet (51 m)

Technical details
- Structural system: Steel and concrete
- Material: Brick, limestone, applied masonry
- Floor count: 7

Design and construction
- Architecture firm: Mauran, Russell and Crowell
- Engineer: Brussell & Viterbo; Spearl, Becker & Falvey
- Main contractor: Kaplan-McGowan Co

Renovating team
- Architect: Adrian Luchini
- Renovating firm: Luchiniad

Other information
- Parking: Secure onsite garage
- Public transit: MetroLink and MetroBus

Website
- globebuilding.com
- Globe Building
- U.S. National Register of Historic Places
- NRHP reference No.: 16000548
- Added to NRHP: January 23, 2017

The Globe Building is an Art Deco style office and data center building in Downtown St. Louis, Missouri. Before that it housed the St. Louis Globe-Democrat newspaper and was originally built for the Illinois Terminal Railroad. It is listed on the National Register of Historic Places.

The Globe Building was originally a freight and passenger terminal for the Illinois Terminal Railroad. The railroad commissioned the prominent St. Louis architectural firm Mauran, Russell and Crowell to design the building. During World War II the building housed offices of the predecessor to the Defense Mapping Agency (DMA), which referenced it as their US Aeronautical Chart Plant, St. Louis. The building would later go on to house geographic data and information firms, including geospatial intelligence offices, which complement the nearby National Geospatial-Intelligence Agency (NGA) Campus West (NCW). The construction of a SCIF (sensitive compartmented information facility), which was novel for a private facility not already under federal contract, was publicly announced in May 2022 at which time it was also claimed that a waiting list of companies seeking placement in the Globe Building exceeds fifty. With the decline of railroads in the United States, in the 1950s the building was transitioned to hosting the fledgling daily newspaper, the St. Louis Globe-Democrat. As newspapers also declined and St. Louis became a single major daily newspaper town in the 1980s, the structure was eventually turned into an office and data center building. The modern day Globe Building is adjacent to what became the Washington Avenue Historic District and is near the complex housing America's Center and The Dome at America's Center. Some elements from the building from the railroad and newspaper eras were salvaged for preservation by the National Building Arts Center.

== See also ==
- Architecture of St. Louis
- National Register of Historic Places listings in Downtown and Downtown West St. Louis
