= Shammai Engelmayer =

American journalist

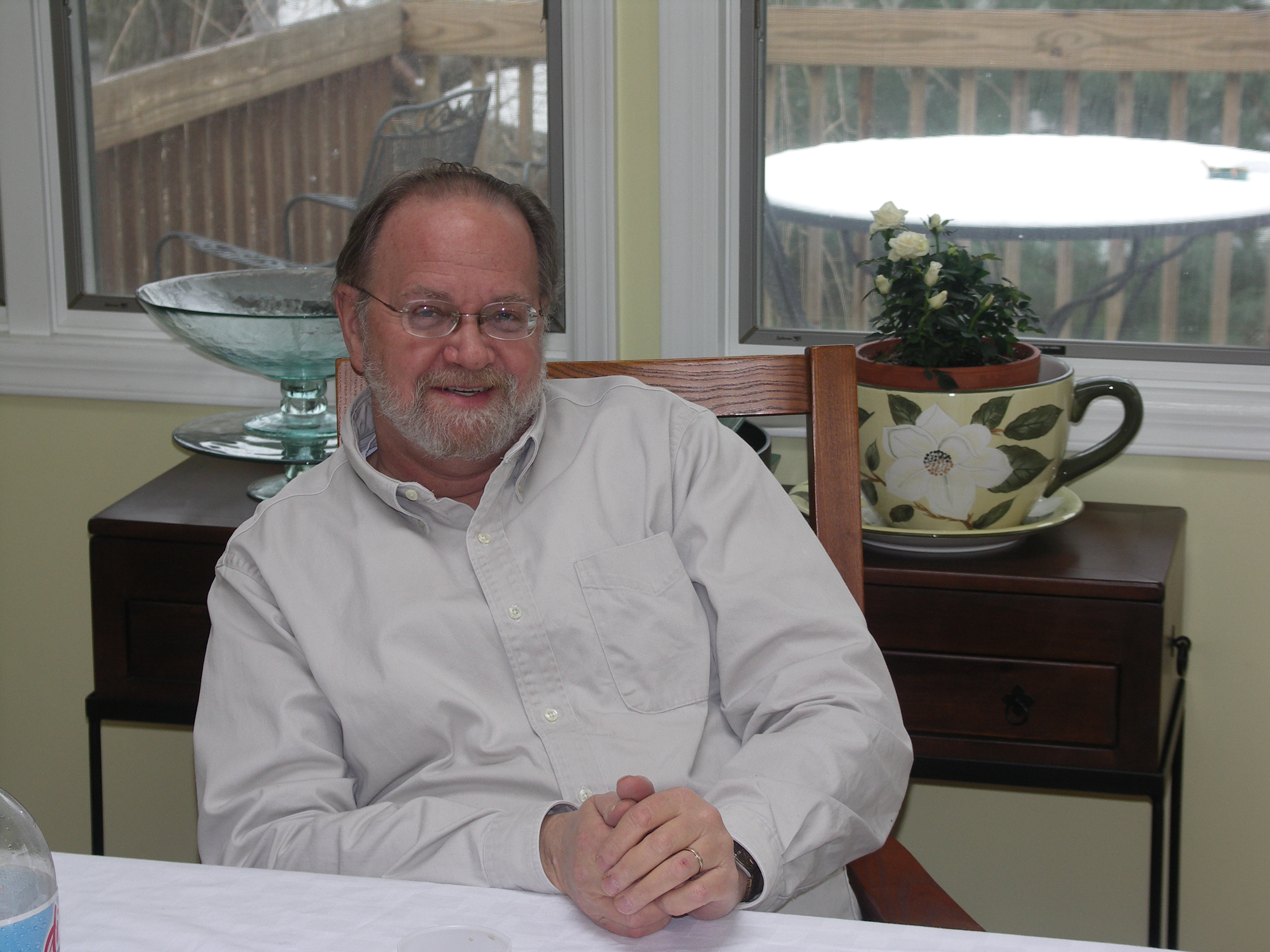
- Born: Sheldon David Engelmayer; July 26, 1945 (age 81); New York City, New York, U.S.
- Occupations: Pulpit rabbi, Jewish commentator
- Known for: Jewish law columnist, social advocacy, political commentary
- Spouse(s): Roslyn Engelmayer; Marilyn Henry (deceased)
- Children: 3
- Website: Shammai Engelmayer

Sheldon David Engelmayer (Hebrew: שמאי; born July 26, 1945) is a full-time pulpit rabbi at the Temple Israel Community Center, an egalitarian Conservative synagogue in Cliffside Park, New Jersey. He is the author of eight nonfiction books on topics ranging from corporate irresponsibility in the A.H. Robins Company's Dalkon Shield intrauterine device case, to biographies of public figures, including Hubert Humphrey and Martha Mitchell.

== History ==
=== Media and journalism ===
In 1967, Engelmayer was a features editor for The Jewish Press, an American weekly newspaper based in Brooklyn, New York. He then became an associate editor with the North American Newspaper Alliance (NANA); at the age of 25, Engelmayer became the editor. United Features Syndicate (UFS) acquired and absorbed NANA, and from 1972 to 1979, Engelmayer edited under the banner of UFS.

He became the first editor of Jack Anderson's "Washington Merry-Go-Round" column and was a part of Anderson's winning of the Pulitzer Prize.

His own investigative work writing about the American natural gas shortage in the Seventies won him the Thomas L. Stokes Award for National Reporting, Washington Journalism Center.

In the 1970s and 1980s, Engelmayer was almost a regular on the Barry Farber radio show, with Farber calling him "the big Shamm", referring to his Hebrew name, Shammai, which he began using professionally once he became a pulpit rabbi.

In the early 1980s, Engelmayer replaced David Gross as the executive editor of the New York Jewish Week, a New York–based Jewish issues weekly newspaper. He left in 1991 and took a post as director of communications for the Jewish Theological Seminary in New York City, where he also renewed his rabbinical ordination, preparing him for his pulpit position.

He was also briefly the editor of the MetroWest Jewish News from 1996 to 1998.

In January 2007, Engelmayer established an award-winning column ("Keeping the Faith") for the New Jersey–based weekly newspaper The Jewish Standard, in which he discusses current issues through the prism of Jewish law. He was the editor of The Jewish Standard until he resigned in 2012. He continued his weekly column, but now had time to teach and run his synagogue, which has since merged with three other synagogues that were dwindling in numbers and looking for new leadership.

In 1981, he and his frequent writing partner, Robert Wagman, NANA's Washington, D.C., bureau chief, produced a documentary called The Making of Lion of the Desert, a film about pre-WWII fascist Italy, starring Anthony Quinn, Oliver Reed, and Rod Steiger.

=== Rabbinate ===
Ordained as an Orthodox Jewish rabbi in 1967, he chose the field of journalism. In 1992, while working at the Jewish Theological Society he also enrolled in rabbinate courses and recertified his ordination through the Conservative Jewish movement. His first pulpit was the Lake Hopatcong Jewish Center in New Jersey. He would find a congregation closer to his home, Temple Israel in Cliffside Park, and merged with other neighboring congregations.

=== Personal life ===
Engelmayer was married to Roslyn Engelmayer, and then to the writer, Marilyn Henry, who died in 2011. He has three children and lives in Teaneck, New Jersey.

== Awards and recognition ==
- Rockower Award in 2011 for Commentary/2nd place, The Standard (for an article on President Obama's stance on Israel). It is noteworthy is that back in 1978–79 Engelmayer had held President Jimmy Carter accountable for what he and his co-author Robert Wagman called "broken promises" over wage and price controls, defence spending, and nuclear proliferation.
- Rockower Award in 2010 - First Place for Editorial Writing, in 2005 for Commentary/2nd place, American Jewish Press Association, Rockower Award for Commentary/2nd place, AJPA, 2004, Rockower Award for Editorial Writing/1st place, American Jewish Press Association, 1990
- Rockower Award for Editorial Writing/2nd place, AJPA, 1989
- Rockower Award for Editorial Writing/1st place, AJPA, 1988,
- Thomas L. Stokes Award for National Reporting, Washington Journalism Center, 1975
- In 1975, he won the Washington Journalism Center's Thomas L. Stokes Award for National Reporting.
- Media Humanitarian Award, National Association of Justice, 1974

== Books ==
- Martha: The Mouth that Roared
- Lord's Justice
- HUBERT HUMPHREY The man and His Dream
- Hostage
- Tax revolt 1980: A how-to guide
- Where there's smoke (A Last Resort Mystery Book 1)
- Common Ground
