= St. Louis Star-Times =

Newspaper in Missouri, US (1884–1952)

- Founded: 1884
- Ceased publication: June 15, 1951
- Headquarters: St. Louis

The St. Louis Star-Times was a newspaper published in St. Louis, Missouri. Founded as The St. Louis Sunday Sayings in 1884, it operated independently until 1951, when it was purchased by the St. Louis Post-Dispatch.

== History ==
The newspaper was founded by a printer and a reporter in 1884 as The St. Louis Sunday Sayings. Renamed The Evening Star-Sayings, it emerged as a competitor to the St. Louis Post-Dispatch, which had been founded by the merger of two newspapers in 1878.

The newspaper became the St. Louis Star in 1896, and the Star-Chronicle in 1905. It returned to the name St. Louis Star in 1908; the New St. Louis Star in 1913; and then back to the St. Louis Star in 1914. In 1918, The Star's circulation eclipsed that of local rival The Times, which had exceeded 100,000 from 1916 to 1918.

In June 1932, The Star purchased The American Press, publisher of The Times, to create The St. Louis Star and Times. The Times was Republican, while The Star considered itself nonpartisan.

After several money-losing years that publisher Elzey Roberts attributed to "ever-mounting labor and material costs", the Star was sold in 1951 to Pulitzer Publishing Co., publisher of the Post-Dispatch. The Star published its final edition on June 15, 1951.
