= Mitchell Hamline Law Review =

- Discipline: Law
- Language: English
- Edited by: Mitchell Hamline Law Review Board of Editors

Publication details
- Former names: Hamline Law Review, William Mitchell Law Review
- History: 1972
- Publisher: Mitchell Hamline Law Review (United States)
- Frequency: 5/year
- Open access: Yes

Standard abbreviations
- Bluebook: Mitchell Hamline L. Rev.
- ISO 4: Mitchell Hamline Law Rev.

Indexing
- ISSN: 0270-272X
- OCLC no.: 818988572

Links
- Journal homepage; Online access

The Mitchell Hamline Law Review is a student-run law review published by students at the Mitchell Hamline School of Law in Saint Paul, Minnesota. The journal publishes five full issues each academic year. The journal's mission is to "provide a scholarly forum for the advancement of legal theory and practice by publishing articles of academic merit and practical importance to the local and national legal community." The law review is a product of 2015 Hamline University School of Law and William Mitchell College of Law merger.

== History ==
The Mitchell Hamline Law Review traces its origins to both the Hamline Law Review and William Mitchell Law Review. The Hamline Law Review released its first issue in 1978 and published over 700 articles throughout its thirty-five-year history. In 1972, a student-faculty committee at the William Mitchell College of Law started the first ever law review published at a school with a part-time evening program. Under the guidance of Professor Michael Steenson, the William Mitchell Law Review published its first issue in 1974.

In 2016, the Hamline Law Review and William Mitchell Law Review merged into the combined Mitchell Hamline Law Review. Steenson has continues to serve as the faculty advisor for the joint law journal.

Each year the law review recognizes members of the legal community who have made outstanding contributions to the legal profession during its annual banquet. Past award winners have included David Lillehaug and John Choi.

== Notable Authors ==
Notable authors published by the Mitchell Hamline Law Review and its predecessors include Jimmy Carter, Donovan W. Frank, Anne McKeig, Ann D. Montgomery, and Larry Obhof.

== Admissions ==
The law review accepts new members through its annual write-on. Interested law students are asked to complete a Bluebook quiz and case note.
