= United States v. Moore (1973) =

1973 D.C. Circuit Court of Appeals case

- Court: United States Court of Appeals for the District of Columbia Circuit
- Full case name: United States of America v. Raymond Moore
- Argued: September 10, 1971
- Decided: May 14, 1973
- Citation: 486 F.2d 1139

Case history
- Appealed from: United States District Court for the District of Columbia
- Subsequent history: Certiorari denied, 414 U.S. 980 (1973)

Holding
- Narcotics addiction is not a defense to criminal prosecution for possession of narcotics.

Court membership
- Judges sitting: David L. Bazelon, J. Skelly Wright, Carl E. McGowan, Edward Allen Tamm, Harold Leventhal, Spottswood William Robinson III, George MacKinnon, Roger Robb, Malcolm Richard Wilkey (en banc)

Case opinions
- Per curiam
- Concurrence: Wilkey, joined by MacKinnon, Robb
- Concurrence: Leventhal, joined by McGowan, MacKinnon (part IV only), Bazelon (part V only)
- Concurrence: MacKinnon
- Concurrence: Robb
- Concur/dissent: Bazelon
- Dissent: Wright, joined by Bazelon, Tamm, Robinson

United States v. Moore, 486 F.2d 1139 (D.C. Cir. 1973), was a case heard by the United States Court of Appeals for the District of Columbia Circuit in which the court ruled that narcotics addicts are not protected from prosecution for narcotics possession. Police officers investigating a drug trafficking ring found the defendant, Raymond Moore, in a hotel room with heroin capsules in his pocket; he was charged with narcotics possession. Moore claimed at trial and on appeal that his addiction to heroin forced him to possess and use drugs. He argued that because he did not have the free will to keep himself from possessing drugs, he should not be held criminally responsible. (Note: This case touches on biomedical topics, like the classification and nature of addiction. This article's coverage of those topics is largely shaped by the perspectives of contemporaneous legal scholars, and should not be taken to reflect contemporary medical understanding.) At trial, he was convicted and sentenced to six years in prison.

Moore's proposed addiction defense on appeal to the D.C. Circuit was based on three legal foundations. First, his lawyers argued that laws criminalizing possession of narcotics were not intended to apply to narcotics addicts. Second, his lawyers argued that narcotics addicts are protected by the common law principle of mens rea (meaning a "guilty mind"), which generally requires the government to prove that a person had the free will to commit a crime before they can be found guilty of it. (Note: In other contexts, legal sources interpret voluntariness to be a part of the actus reus (guilty act); under that framework, the mens rea is only the perpetrator's mental state at the time they committed the act.) Third, his lawyers argued that punishing a narcotics addict for possession would be cruel and unusual punishment in violation of the Eighth Amendment, citing a previous U.S. Supreme Court ruling. The government responded that the law was not intended to create an addiction defense, and that the Supreme Court ruling did not apply to this case.

The D.C. Circuit upheld Moore's conviction in a 5–4 vote, refusing to create the addiction defense. The five judges, split across two separate opinions, doubted that addicts physically cannot keep themselves from taking drugs; they also worried that the defense could potentially apply to crimes more serious than possession, or incentivize people to fake addiction. The dissent supported Moore's legal arguments and argued even further that the justice system accomplishes nothing by imprisoning an addict for possession. (Note: The scope of this case only concerns criminal charges and punishment; if a court ruled that addiction is a defense to the criminal charge of possession, the government could still involuntarily confine an addict to a drug rehabilitation facility under civil law.) The court remanded Moore's case to the lower court for reconsideration of his sentence. Other courts have widely adopted Moore's holding, while legal commentators split sharply; some scholars defended the court's rejection of the addiction defense as legally sound and a necessary deterrent, while others attacked it as unsupported by the law and medical evidence.

== Factual background ==
In January 1970, police officers searched a hotel room in Washington, D.C., as part of an investigation into a heroin smuggling operation. In the hotel room was drug paraphernalia and a man named Raymond Moore, who had 50 heroin capsules in his pocket. The capsules collectively contained 2.3 grams (0.081 oz) of a mixture that was 4–7% heroin. Moore was arrested and charged in the United States District Court for the District of Columbia with four counts of violating the Harrison Narcotics Tax Act and the Jones–Miller Act, (Note: Since repealed and replaced by the Comprehensive Drug Abuse Prevention and Control Act of 1970.) which, among other offenses, make it illegal for a person to possess heroin. Moore claimed to be a heroin addict who only took enough heroin to satisfy his addiction.

Moore asked the court to dismiss the charges against him, arguing that since he was addicted to heroin but did not sell or distribute to others, (Note: Moore being a non-trafficking addict was, to some extent, a legal fiction; some evidence in this case did point to him being involved in trafficking, and in over 25 years of narcotics addiction, he spent 13 years in prison due to 14 different criminal convictions, none of which were for drug possession. For the purposes of the legal questions here, though, Moore was treated as a non-trafficking addict.) he should be exempt from the charges on two grounds: first, that addicts lack the mens rea ("guilty mind") to be held criminally responsible, and second, that enforcing the law against addicts would be cruel and unusual punishment in violation of the Eighth Amendment. The court refused. It also suppressed testimony from a psychiatrist who said that Moore had been an addict for over 25 years, and could not control his urge to take heroin, because the court ruled that addiction is not a defense to heroin possession. The jury convicted Moore on all four counts; the court considered diverting him towards treatment under the Narcotics Addict Rehabilitation Act of 1966, but decided he was ineligible; the court sentenced him instead to a total of six years in prison. Moore appealed to the D.C. Circuit Court of Appeals.

== Legal background ==
=== Addiction and mens rea ===
Medical and legal experts have long debated whether, and to what extent, a defendant's addiction should excuse them from criminal responsibility for their actions. Richard Boldt, writing in the University of Pennsylvania Law Review, explains the debate through the lens of free will and determinism; according to Boldt, the medical field tends to take a determinist view in which the same set of conditions will lead to the same outcome every time, while the legal system is built on the presumption that people can control their actions. While loss-of-control defenses do exist under the law, Boldt writes that those are separated from addiction in the legal context because addicts are treated as having the "opportunity and capacity for reflection". Elaine M. Chiu, writing in the Buffalo Criminal Law Review, connects the debate to the American public's attitudes on whether criminal punishment should reflect utilitarian values (emphasizing the common good) or retributive values (emphasizing blameworthiness).

According to Boldt, medical research has for the most part workably defined addiction as a disease, although there is some fuzziness over terminology. The World Health Organization and American Psychiatric Association have recognized alcoholism as such since the 1950s. While there were still major open questions at the time of Moore and afterward – particularly on who is vulnerable to developing alcoholism – research on alcoholism has documented how addicts develop an increasingly high alcohol tolerance, as well as withdrawal symptoms if they stop drinking. Some experts also point to an informal observation called "alcoholic denial", which is a tendency of alcoholics to deny that they have a problem. These defining symptoms, according to the literature, tend to make alcoholics completely or mostly unable to control their drinking; these tendencies are similarly present in narcotics addiction cases. Judge J. Skelly Wright, dissenting in this case, observed that society generally agrees that addiction forces people to acquire and use drugs, and that addicts cannot overcome the urges from addiction with free will alone.

Under U.S. common law, to convict someone of a crime, the government generally has to show that the accused had mens rea ("guilty mind"), which involves the accused having had the free will to commit the crime. One example of a defense based on a lack of mens rea is the insanity defense, which generally excuses the accused of all criminal responsibility. The D.C. Circuit ruled in 1965 (Note: Heard v. United States, 348 F.2d 43 (D.C. Cir. 1965).) that addiction alone does not meet the legal definition of insanity; however, the court also ruled en banc in Easter v. District of Columbia (Note: 361 F.2d 50 (D.C. Cir. 1966).) that alcoholism can be a defense against public intoxication because, despite not being a form of insanity, alcoholics still lack the free will necessary to keep themselves from committing that particular act.

Some supporters of the addiction defense cite the legislative history of the acts criminalizing possession; the history does not explicitly endorse the defense, but it also does not rule it out. The acts were mainly intended to regulate acts around possession like importing and distributing narcotics, and possessing narcotics was viewed as strong evidence that some other illegal act had been committed. The Jones-Miller Act makes no mention of whether or not the law should apply purely to non-trafficking addicts. Some argue that Congress never intended for the law to apply to them; others counter that Congress never intended to create a specific exception for them, either. The interplay between addiction and free will can also affect crimes other than drug possession – in fact, possession charges for addicts were rare. Moore had not been convicted of possession once and still spent 13 years in prison on various charges related to his addiction before this case.

Some legal scholars dispute the idea that addiction should be considered a disease, or else that loss of control or free will from addiction should excuse a person from criminal responsibility. One advocate of this position was Herbert Fingarette, who argued that a behavior being a symptom of a disease does not automatically mean that the behavior should be considered involuntary.

=== Robinson v. California ===
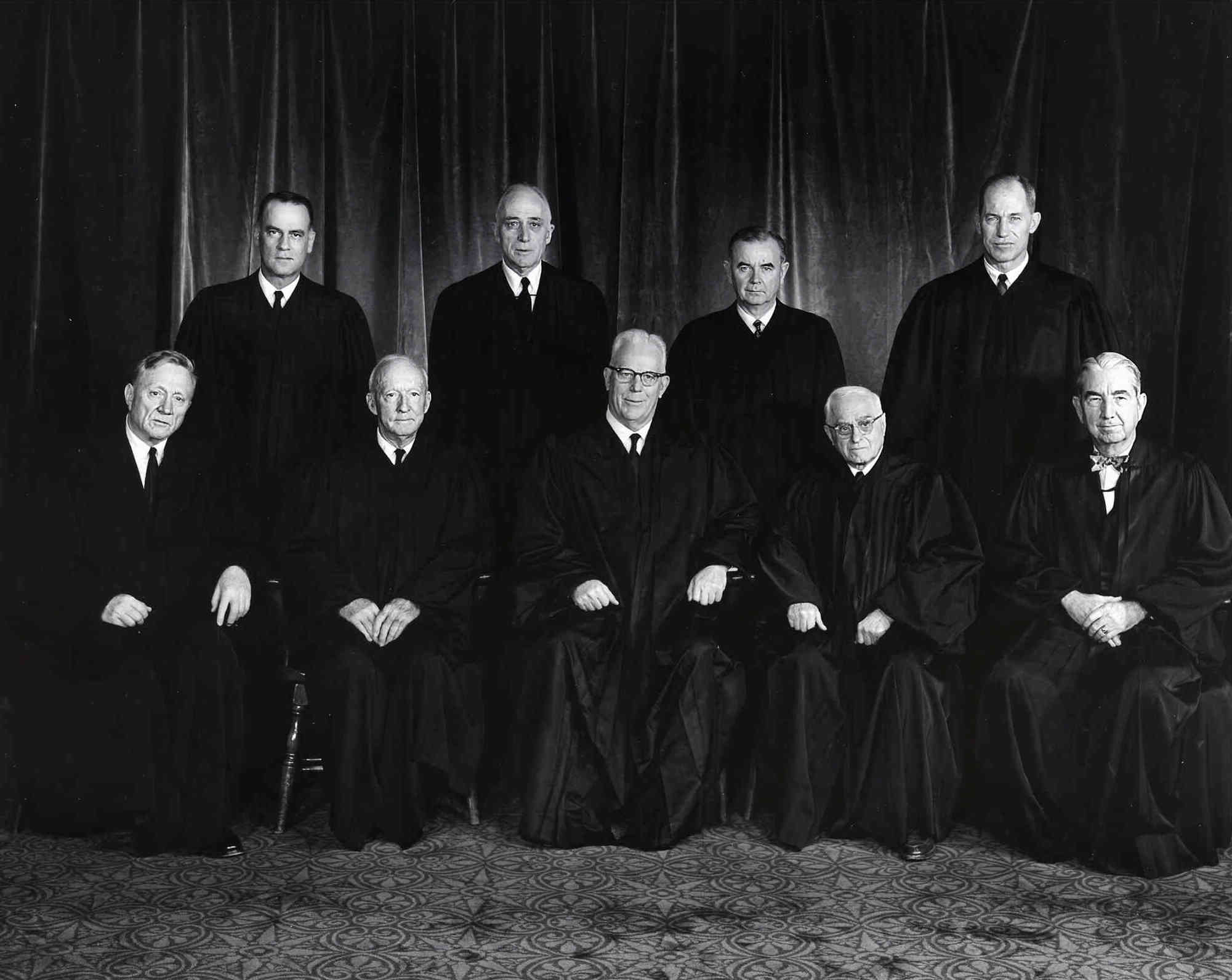
The U.S. Supreme Court, pictured in 1962

In Robinson v. California (1962), (Note: 370 U.S. 660 (1962).) the Supreme Court struck down a law that made it illegal to be a narcotics addict, ruling that it violated the Eighth Amendment's protection against "cruel and unusual punishments". However, the language of the decision made it unclear what exactly the Supreme Court was protecting; under one theory, the court was protecting all acts that are compelled by addiction – including the possession of drugs – but under a narrower reading, the court was only ruling against criminalizing the status of being an addict, simply requiring that there be an actus reus ("guilty act").

Lower courts, met with addicts claiming protection from possession charges under Robinson, mainly endorsed the narrow view that Robinson only protected people from status crimes, but legal scholars and some appellate courts disagreed; the Fourth Circuit Court of Appeals interpreted Robinson broadly, ruling in Driver v. Hinnant (Note: 356 F.2d 761 (4th Cir. 1966).) that it protects alcoholics from being convicted of public intoxication. (Note: The facts of Driver are similar to the facts of Easter v. District of Columbia, and both courts reached the same conclusion; but in Easter, the D.C. Circuit ruled based on the defendant's mens rea, which is a common law principle. Driver cited both mens rea and Robinson, which is based on the Eighth Amendment's prohibition against "cruel and unusual punishments".)

Looking to resolve the conflict, the Supreme Court upheld the conviction of an alcoholic for public intoxication in Powell v. Texas (Note: 392 U.S. 514 (1968).) in a 5–4 vote, but they could not agree on a rationale; four justices upheld the conviction because they agreed with the narrow view that Robinson does not protect acts compelled by addiction. They also were reticent about creating substantive criminal law out of the Constitution, encouraging defendants to instead raise mens rea and necessity defenses in state courts. Justice Byron White provided the fifth vote on a different rationale; he took the broad view that Robinson does protect acts compelled by addiction, but he argued that public intoxication is not compelled by alcoholism. The Court's failure to reach a consensus added complexity and confusion to the debate over Robinson, rather than clarifying it. David Robinson Jr., who represented Texas before the Supreme Court in Powell v. Texas, argued in the American Journal of Criminal Law that if Powell had been decided differently, it would have "almost surely" changed the eventual outcome in Moore.

Most courts taking up the issue after Powell followed the narrow interpretation, but the D.C. Circuit disagreed with that trend in Watson v. United States (1970), (Note: 439 F.2d 442 (D.C. Cir. 1970).) a case similar to Moore in that it also involved an addict charged with heroin possession. Unlike most courts after Powell, the majority in Watson wrote that Congress never intended for the heroin possession law to apply to addicts, and even if they did, narcotics addicts would be protected by Robinson. However, the case was ultimately decided on other grounds, making their holdings on Robinson and congressional intent obiter dicta ("said in passing"). Lower courts in D.C. could not agree whether the D.C. Circuit's Watson holding on Robinson was binding.

== District of Columbia Circuit Court of Appeals ==
Moore was represented by future D.C. Circuit judge Patricia Wald in court. Wald was a member of the Washington Lawyers' Committee (WLC), an organization formed in 1968 to eradicate racial bias in the criminal justice system. The WLC looked to build on the recent lower court rulings on alcoholism, and eventually to use the court system to replace criminalization of drug use with efforts to rehabilitate drug users. Originally, Moore was represented by Peter B. Hutt – he filed Moore's legal brief – but Hutt was then appointed chief counsel to the Food and Drug Administration.

Moore appealed his conviction for possession of narcotics based on a proposed addiction defense. He cited three arguments in support of his defense: first, that Congress never intended for the law to apply to addicts; second, that addicts do not have the free will to prevent them from committing the crime and do not have mens rea; and third, that Robinson v. California makes it unconstitutional to criminalize the status of addiction, and that possession is an unavoidable consequence of addiction.

=== Opinion of the court and main concurrences ===
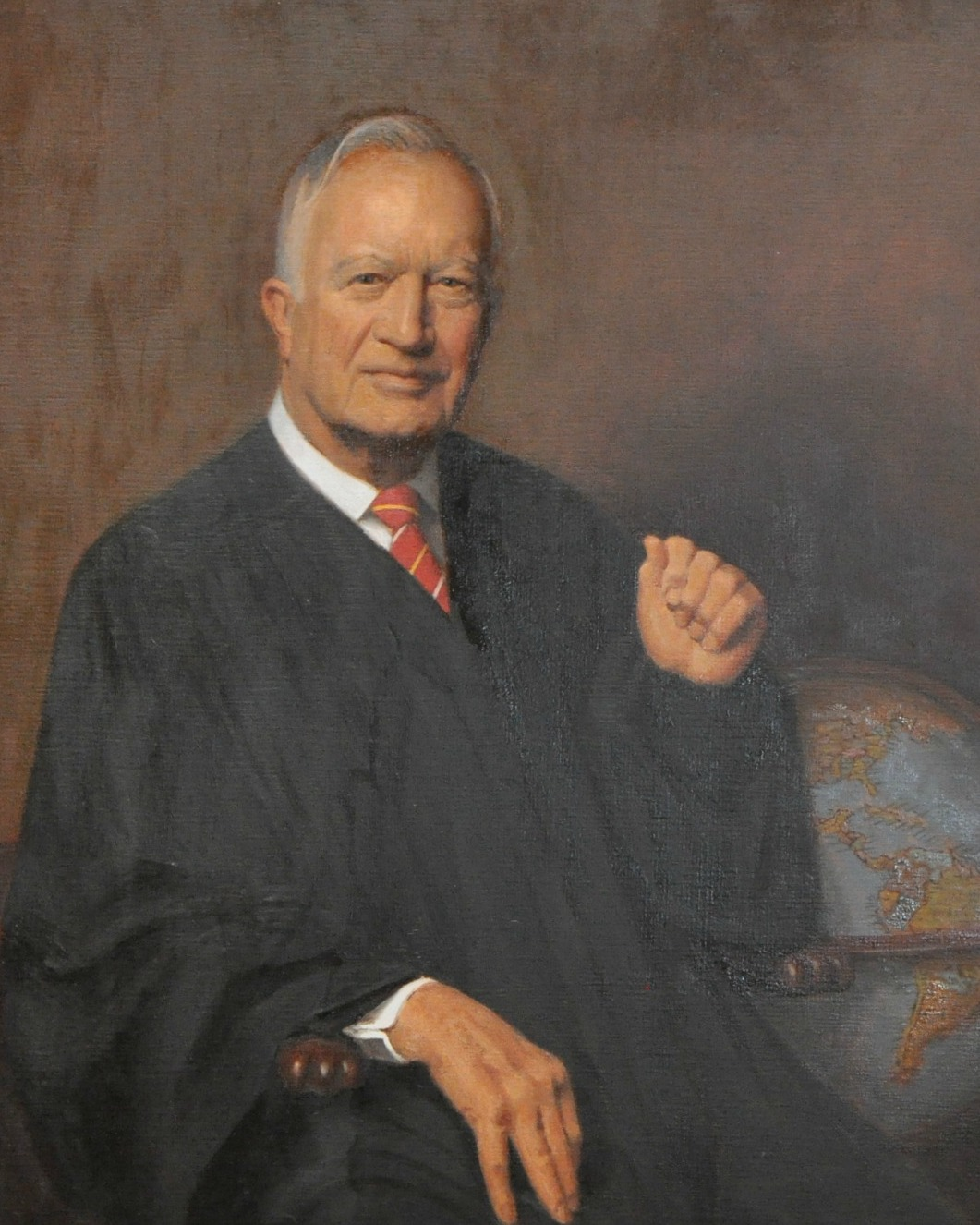
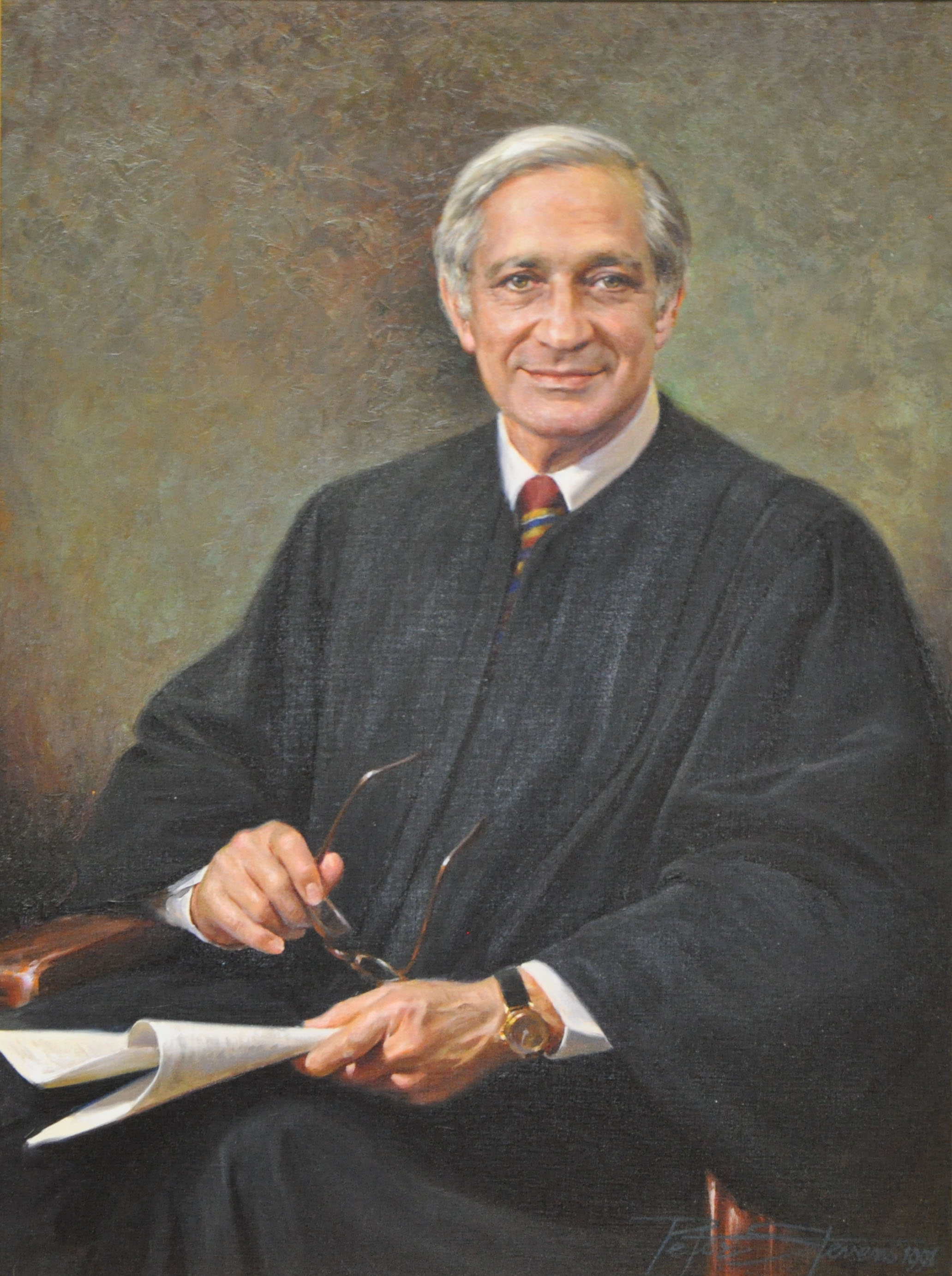
Malcolm Richard Wilkey (left) and Harold Leventhal (right) wrote the main concurrences in the D.C. Circuit's per curiam decision.

The D.C. Circuit Court of Appeals voted 5–4 to uphold Moore's conviction in a per curiam opinion released on May 14, 1973; that was the only issue on which the court formed a clear majority. The five in favor – judges Malcolm Richard Wilkey, George MacKinnon, and Roger Robb in one opinion and judges Harold Leventhal and Carl E. McGowan in another – doubted that drug use could be attributed solely to addiction and loss of control. They also raised concerns about whether the defense could be workably implemented in practice. MacKinnon and Judge David L. Bazelon both joined Leventhal's opinion as well, but only as to Part IV (rejecting the addiction defense) and Part V (remanding for reconsideration of sentencing), respectively.

Wilkey argued in his concurring opinion that drug use is a failure of one's "strength of character" against their cravings. He wrote that a person's choice to use drugs rather than go through the "admittedly painful process of withdrawal" is one they can be blamed and held criminally responsible for. Otherwise, he argued, the courts would be forced to excuse addicts who commit robbery for money to buy drugs, since those acts would be seen as coming from an even greater loss of self-control. Wilkey also argued that a drug addict does have to willingly take drugs at least once before becoming addicted; therefore, he said, every use after that is "the direct product of a freely willed illegal act".

Leventhal, in his concurring opinion, wrote that courts might have a difficult time determining whether a given defendant is really an addict and not faking addiction to get out of drug charges. This was a key distinction he drew between the proposed addiction defense and the already-existing duress and insanity defenses; for one of these defenses to be successful, Leventhal held, it should be "gross and verifiable" and linked to the conduct, to distinguish "those who can't" from "those who won't". Leventhal argued that duress is possible to prove or disprove because that loss of control comes from an identifiable third party, and that insanity is possible to prove or disprove because it can be documented based on a set of diagnostic criteria beyond just the narrow conduct that brought the defendant to court. For addiction, Leventhal said, the only evidence of the disease is often the drug use itself, which creates a problem of circular reasoning. As such, he felt a judge or jury would not be able to reliably determine whether someone is responsible for their own drug use.

On the issue of precedent, Wilkey and Leventhal both considered Robinson and Powell not to apply to Moore's case, taking the narrow view that they prohibited only status crimes. Wilkey acknowledged the confusion coming from the court's lack of a majority in Powell, but felt the Supreme Court should be the one to clarify their intent. He also distinguished Powell factually, reasoning that Powell was punished for conduct in public resulting from ingesting a legal substance, whereas for Moore, the ingestion itself was illegal. Leventhal disagreed that White's opinion in Powell endorsed the broad view of Robinson, arguing that even though he did suggest that Robinson would protect an addict from being charged with possession, his overall approach was still closer to the narrow view. The D.C. Circuit's previous decision in Watson was held to not be binding on the court, and the majority felt that Congress's trend of giving judges discretion to sentence convicts to rehabilitation indicated a congressional intent to be sensitive towards addiction without completely removing criminal responsibility.

MacKinnon and Robb filed separate concurring opinions voting to uphold the conviction and the sentences. Leventhal argued in his opinion to remand the sentence to the trial court so that the court could consider a lighter sentence under the Narcotics Addict Rehabilitation Act; Wilkey disagreed, but without a majority to uphold the sentence, the sentence was remanded to the trial court. The Supreme Court denied a petition to take the case on October 23, 1973; Justice William O. Douglas dissented.

=== Other opinions ===
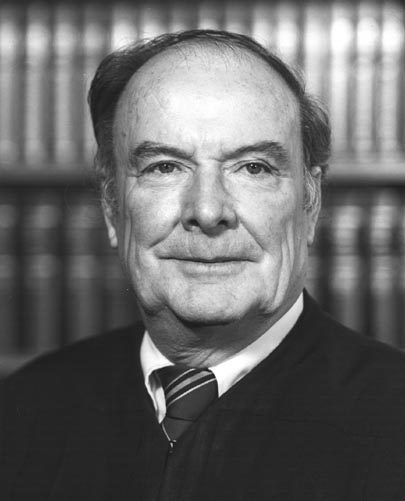
J. Skelly Wright wrote the main dissent.

The main dissent was written by Judge J. Skelly Wright and joined by Bazelon, as well as judges Edward Allen Tamm and Spottswood William Robinson III. Wright would have accepted Moore's arguments to create an addiction defense based on mens rea and Robinson. On the issue of mens rea, he argued that standard practice in criminal law is to not hold someone criminally responsible for something they had no control over. On the issue of Robinson, he pointed to White's concurrence and the four justices in dissent on Powell, all of whom interpreted Robinson in a way that would create some kind of addiction defense. Wright even would have extended the defense to crimes other than possession, but felt that Congress's intent in passing anti-narcotics laws and the Supreme Court's ruling in Powell ruled that out. In response to the judges who worried that people accused of narcotics possession could fake being an addict, Wright responded that a jury has to make a similar judgment call when a defendant claims legal insanity, and that the jury would be provided with as much evidence as needed to decide whether or not someone really is an addict.

More fundamentally than the issues of mens rea, Robinson, or congressional intent, Wright argued that sending an addict to prison for possession went against the defining goals of imprisonment – to punish an offender, to restrain them from committing the same crime immediately, to deter them from committing the same crime in the future, and to rehabilitate them into society after their sentence has been served. Wright argued that since addiction forces addicts to take drugs, the threat of jail would have no deterrent effect on an addict, and that the justice system cannot punish people for things outside of their control. While he did acknowledge that prison does restrain an addict from using drugs, he wrote that confinement to a drug rehabilitation facility under civil law would accomplish the same thing and do a better job of rehabilitating the addict.

David L. Bazelon wrote separately to concur in part and dissent in part. Addressing the concern raised by Wilkey that an addiction defense would have to extend beyond possession to any act compelled by an addiction, like a bank robbery for drug money, Bazelon wrote that an addiction defense should exist and that Wilkey's concern was correct; he argued for a sweeping addiction defense that protects a person from being punished for anything their addiction forces them to do. While Bazelon acknowledged that his position had practical difficulties, he still felt that limiting Robinson only to possession was logically untenable. He was the only judge to hold that Congress might have intended to protect acts other than possession in their lawmaking.

== Reaction ==
=== In the courts ===
Despite Moore's fractured and narrow ruling, other courts have generally rejected involuntary-act defenses to drug possession charges, following the lead of Wilkey's plurality opinion. As of 2016, addiction alone is not sufficient to raise a defense to any crime in the United States, England, or Canada, with very few exceptions; several U.S. states explicitly exclude it in codified law. David Robinson Jr. wrote in the American Journal of Criminal Law that had Moore gone the other way, it could have interfered with the enforcement of drug sale and possession laws. The Washington Lawyers' Committee – finding success in neither Moore nor a separate case in D.C. local courts on the same issue – pivoted to non-judicial advocacy for drug users, making a much larger impact there.

=== In academia ===
Scholarly opinion on Moore has been heavily split. Richard Boldt agreed with the dissent on some of the substantive issues in a 1992 article in the University of Pennsylvania Law Review, pointing to Wright's dissent as a "powerful argument" for the addiction defense. He approvingly noted the large amount of medical evidence cited by Wright to show that addiction removes the ability for self-control; however, he criticized Wright's argument for leaving no room for someone to suffer from addiction but still make a willing choice to use drugs. Alan R. Sankin argued in a 1974 article in the University of Toledo Law Review that "there is a basic logic which would excuse the addict from criminal responsibility for any act in which he lacked substantial capacity to conform his conduct to the requirement of the law." Lynne M. Brennan made a similar argument in the Hamline Law Review in 1998, emphasizing that Moore's crime had no victim and advocating for drug courts as a method of rehabilitation over punishment. Matthew D. Moyer, writing in the Notre Dame Law Review in 2017, takes a completely deterministic view; he writes that that retributive justice has no place in the law because it is dependent on free will, citing Moore as an example of a case where a lack of freedom is most apparent.

Boldt also criticizes Wilkey's "strength of character" argument as vague and inconsistent, writing that it does not sufficiently define the term. Under Wilkey's formulation, Boldt writes, two people with identical strength of character are treated differently if one has strong enough cravings to force them to use drugs and the other does not – the first person's punishment turns on the strength of their craving, something they cannot control. Moyer criticizes Wilkey's opinion as an exhibition of a "fundamental misunderstanding of addiction and the decision-making process in general" for similar reasons.

Stephen J. Morse disagreed in his 2016 book Addiction and Choice, raising two arguments against Moore's proposed addiction defense and others like it. First, he argues that the criminal penalties can serve as an effective deterrent for at least some addicts, asserting that it is not completely understood how much capacity for choice an addict has and that, "on the margin", stiff penalties may make a difference. Second, he argues that at times outside of "peak craving", addicts make a choice not to seek treatment, despite knowing that the craving will return, knowingly putting themselves at risk of criminal behavior or behavior harmful to others. Michael Davis, writing in the Texas Law Review, argued that "addicts who act in accordance with their addictions by acquiring drugs have acted immorally".

Mark Kelman argued in the Stanford Law Review in 1981 that Wright's framing of the incident was too narrow; by limiting the considered time frame just to the moment the drugs are taken, he wrote, Wright was absolving Moore of responsibility when a consideration of his circumstances overall would have revealed ample opportunity for choice, opening up the possibility of retribution for those choices. By way of example, he writes: "Certainly, it is not at all uncommon or bizarre for a parent to blame (and punish) a child who goes out of the house in a storm without adequate raingear for getting a cold, even though the same parent would not punish the child for the "status" of being ill" (emph. in original). Christopher Nowlin partially disagreed in a 2004 article in the Saskatchewan Law Review; focusing on indigenous people in southern Alberta, he argued that considering their broader circumstances would invalidate the argument for retribution, given the variety of socioeconomic hardships unique to them.

On the issue of congressional intent, Sankin argued that Congress not having specified whether the possession laws apply to addicts does not mean that Congress intended for the law to apply to them, only that the issue was left to the courts to resolve. Regarding whether addiction can be readily verified by a jury, Elaine M. Chiu, writing in the Buffalo Criminal Law Review, agreed with Leventhal's opinion, arguing that it cannot. Boldt disagreed, citing the medical evidence he presented as background in the article; however, he acknowledged that many other legal scholars have agreed with Leventhal. Regarding the extent of a hypothetical addiction defense, Sankin wrote that, practically speaking, it would be difficult to extend it beyond possession crimes. Still, he argued that if a court were willing to create an addiction defense to help reduce drug addiction, it should be willing to maximize the effect of the defense by diverting as many people to civil treatment as possible. Boldt, echoing Wilkey's criticism of Wright's argument, argued that limiting the addiction defense to possession was arbitrary and logically inconsistent. Lynne M. Brennan disagreed, writing that Moore's crime was inherent to the status of addiction, which she separates from acts that are merely compelled by addiction.

== Notes and references ==
=== Works cited ===
- Sullivan, Irene A. (1973). "Criminal responsibility and the drug dependence defense–a need for judicial clarification". Fordham Law Review. 42 (2): 361–396.
- Barrick, Gary W. (1974). "Narcotic addict's lack of mens rea not a defense to conviction for illegal possession of narcotics". American Criminal Law Review. 12 (1): 219–230 – via HeinOnline.
- Sankin, Alan R. (1974). "The addiction defense: criminal responsibility of an addict charged with possession". University of Toledo Law Review. 5 (2): 388–403 – via HeinOnline.
- Kelman, Mark (1981). "Interpretive construction in the substantive criminal law". Stanford Law Review. 33 (4): 591–673. JSTOR 1228535 – via JSTOR.
- Boldt, Richard C. (1992). "The construction of responsibility in the criminal law". University of Pennsylvania Law Review. 140 (6): 2245–2332. JSTOR 3312415.
- Brownstein, Alan; Dau, Paul (1992). "The constitutional morality of abortion". Boston College Law Review. 33 (4): 689–782.
- Brennan, Lynne M. (1998). "Drug courts: A new beginning for non-violent drug offenders". Hamline Law Review. 22 (1): 355–397 – via HeinOnline.
- Robinson, David Jr. (1999). "Powell v. Texas: The case of the intoxicated shoeshine man; some reflections a generation later by a participant". American Journal of Criminal Law. 26 (3): 401–454 – via HeinOnline.
- Nowlin, Christopher (2004). "Taking Aboriginal justice beyond Gladue: Canadian criminal law in conflict with human rights". Saskatchewan Law Review. 67 (1): 59–96.
- Chiu, Elaine M. (2005). "The challenge of motive in criminal law". Buffalo Criminal Law Review. 8 (2): 653–729. doi:10.1525/nclr.2005.8.2.653.
- Husak, Douglas (2007). "Rethinking the act requirement". Cardozo Law Review. 28 (6): 2437–2460.
- Yaffe, Gideon (2012). "The voluntary act requirement". In Marmor, Andrei (ed.). The Routledge Companion to Philosophy of Law. Routledge. ISBN 978-0-41-587818-0.
- Morse, Stephen J. (2016). "Addiction, choice, and criminal law". In Heather, Nick; Segal, Gabriel (eds.). Addiction and Choice: Rethinking the Relationship. Oxford University Press. pp. 426–446. ISBN 978-0-191833-42-7.
- Moyer, Matthew D. (2017). "Free will's enormous cost: Why retribution, grounded in free will, is an invalid and impractical penal goal". Notre Dame Law Review. 92 (5): 2231–2258.
- Davis, Michael (2018). "Addiction, criminalization, and character evidence" (PDF). Texas Law Review. 96: 620–653.
- Fornaci, Philip; Pemberton, Alan; Beder, Michael (2018). "Criminal justice in the courts of law and public opinion" (PDF). Howard Law Journal. 62: 126–166.
