= Eric C. Tostrud =

American judge (born 1965)

Eric Tostrud
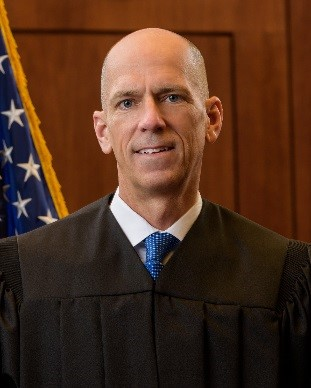
- Official portrait in November 2019

Chief Judge of the United States District Court for the District of Minnesota
- Incumbent
- Assumed office July 1, 2026
- Preceded by: Patrick J. Schiltz

Judge of the United States District Court for the District of Minnesota
- Incumbent
- Assumed office September 10, 2018
- Appointed by: Donald Trump
- Preceded by: Donovan W. Frank

Personal details
- Born: Eric Christian Tostrud; 1965 (age 60–61) Saint Paul, Minnesota, U.S.
- Education: St. Olaf College (BA); William Mitchell College of Law (JD)

Eric Christian Tostrud (born 1965) is an American jurist serving as the chief judge of the United States District Court for the District of Minnesota.

== Early life and education ==
Tostrud was born 1965 in Saint Paul, Minnesota. He received a Bachelor of Arts degree in 1987 from St. Olaf College in Northfield, Minnesota, and a Juris Doctor degree in 1990 from the William Mitchell College of Law in Saint Paul.

== Career ==
=== Clerkship ===
After graduating from law school, Tostrud served as a law clerk to Judge Edward Devitt of the United States District Court for the District of Minnesota and to Judge George MacKinnon of the United States Court of Appeals for the District of Columbia Circuit.

=== Private practice ===
Tostrud worked in private practice at Lockridge Grindal Nauen P.L.L.P., as an associate from 1992 to 1997, a partner from 1998 to 2014, and of counsel until 2018. During his 26 years at the firm, he maintained a complex commercial litigation practice almost exclusively in federal court, with emphasis in complex insurance law, health care law, and ERISA. Tostrud serves on the full-time faculty at Mitchell Hamline School of Law as the Distinguished Practitioner in Residence. He teaches federal jurisdiction and federal court procedural law.

=== Federal judicial service ===
On February 12, 2018, President Donald Trump announced his intent to nominate Tostrud to an undetermined seat on the United States District Court for the District of Minnesota after US Representative Erik Paulsen recommended Tostrud. On February 15, his nomination was sent to the United States Senate. Tostrud was nominated to the seat vacated by Judge Donovan W. Frank, who assumed senior status on October 31, 2016. On April 11, 2018, a hearing on his nomination was held before the United States Senate Committee on the Judiciary. On May 10, his nomination was reported out of committee by voice vote. On September 6, his nomination was confirmed by voice vote. He received his judicial commission on September 10, 2018. Tostrud became chief judge of the court in 2026.

Tostrud spoke at a Federalist Society-sponsored event in 2021.

Legal offices
Preceded by Donovan W. Frank	Judge of the United States District Court for the District of Minnesota; 2018–present	Incumbent
Preceded by Patrick J. Schiltz	Chief Judge of the United States District Court for the District of Minnesota; 2026–present	Incumbent
