= Patrick J. Schiltz =

American federal judge (born 1960)

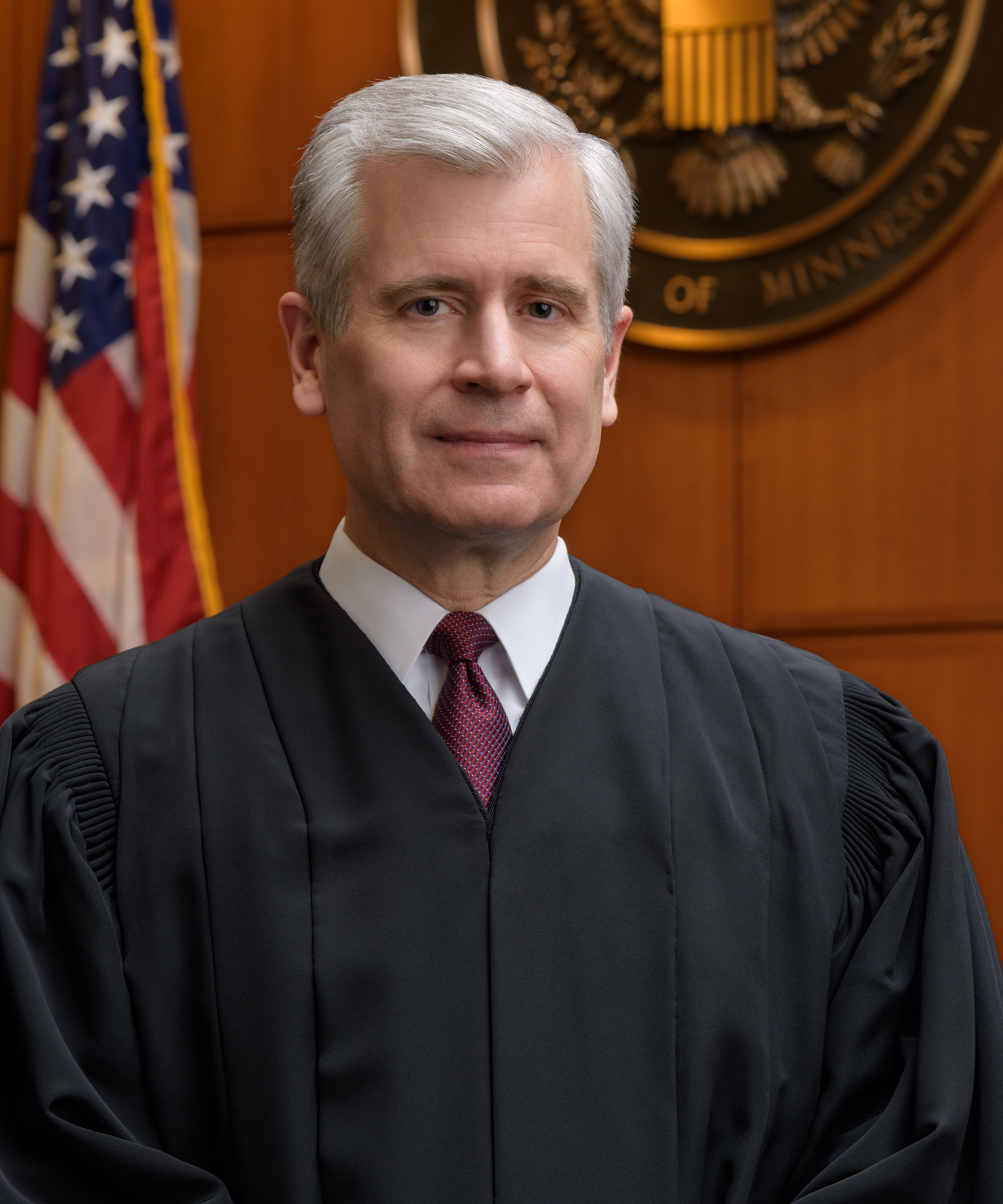
- Official portrait, 2019

Senior Judge of the United States District Court for the District of Minnesota
- Incumbent
- Assumed office July 1, 2026

Chief Judge of the United States District Court for the District of Minnesota
- In office July 1, 2022 – July 1, 2026
- Preceded by: John R. Tunheim
- Succeeded by: Eric C. Tostrud

Judge of the United States District Court for the District of Minnesota
- In office April 28, 2006 – July 1, 2026
- Appointed by: George W. Bush
- Preceded by: Richard H. Kyle
- Succeeded by: Vacant

Personal details
- Born: Patrick Joseph Schiltz; 1960 (age 65–66) Duluth, Minnesota, U.S.
- Education: College of St. Scholastica (BA); Harvard University (JD)

Patrick Joseph Schiltz (born 1960) is an American lawyer and jurist serving as a senior United States district judge of the United States District Court for the District of Minnesota. He was appointed in 2006 by President George W. Bush. Before becoming a federal judge, Schiltz was a law professor at the University of St. Thomas and the University of Notre Dame.

== Early life and education ==
Schiltz was born in 1960, in Duluth, Minnesota, and grew up there. He graduated from the College of St. Scholastica in 1981 with a Bachelor of Arts, summa cum laude, in history, with a minor in sociology. He was a legislative aide to U.S. Senator David Durenberger from 1981 to 1982, then attended Harvard Law School, where he was an editor of the Harvard Law Review. He graduated in 1985 with a Juris Doctor, magna cum laude.

== Career ==
After law school, Schiltz was a law clerk from 1985 to 1986 to Judge Antonin Scalia of the U.S. Court of Appeals for the District of Columbia Circuit. Schiltz had accepted an offer to clerk for Justice Sandra Day O'Connor on the U.S. Supreme Court the next year, but in July 1986, shortly before Schiltz's clerkship with Scalia ended, President Ronald Reagan nominated Scalia to the Supreme Court. Scalia asked Schiltz to help him prepare for his confirmation hearings, and after Scalia was confirmed, he asked Schiltz to clerk for him during his first year on the Supreme Court. With O'Connor's permission, Schiltz clerked for Scalia at the Supreme Court from 1986 to 1987.

Following his clerkships, Schiltz joined the law firm Faegre & Benson (now part of Faegre Drinker) in Minneapolis. He represented the National Football League, the Minnesota Vikings, and the Minnesota Timberwolves in antitrust and contract law; the Star Tribune and other media clients in access and libel litigation; and the Evangelical Lutheran Church in America and other religious organizations in tort and employment matters.

Schiltz left private practice in 1995 to join the faculty of Notre Dame Law School, where he taught civil procedure, evidence, and sports law. While at Notre Dame, Schiltz wrote "On Being a Happy, Healthy, and Ethical Member of an Unhappy, Unhealthy, and Unethical Profession", one of the most widely read law-review articles ever published. The Vanderbilt Law Review published the article and made it the focus of a symposium, and an op-ed in the Washington Post later called the article one of nine works every law student should read. One of Schlitz's star students at Notre Dame was future Supreme Court justice Amy Coney Barrett, whom Schiltz helped get a clerkship with Justice Scalia.

In 2000, Schiltz left Notre Dame to become the founding associate dean of the University of St. Thomas School of Law in Minnesota. He had primary responsibility for almost every significant aspect of creating the school, from hiring the faculty to designing the building. In 2002, Schiltz was named the St. Thomas More Chair in Law, the first endowed chair at the School of Law.

From 1997 to 2006, Schiltz served as the Reporter to the Advisory Committee on the Federal Rules of Appellate Procedure. Among those who served on the Committee during Schiltz’s tenure were future Supreme Court Justices John G. Roberts, Jr. and Samuel A. Alito, Jr.

In October 2026, the Justice Department asked that Schiltz be removed from an immigration case, saying comments he made to The New York Times raised questions about impartiality. Schiltz scheduled a hearing on the request for November 23, 2026.

=== Federal judicial service ===
On December 14, 2005, President George W. Bush nominated Schiltz to serve on the United States District Court for the District of Minnesota after Judge Richard H. Kyle assumed senior status. The United States Senate confirmed Schiltz's appointment on April 26, 2006, and he received his commission on April 28. He became Chief Judge of the federal district court on July 1, 2022. He took senior status on July 1, 2026.

==== Reaction to Operation Metro Surge ====
In January 2026, after the Trump administration launched Operation Metro Surge in the Twin Cities area, Schlitz ordered U.S. Immigration and Customs Enforcement (ICE) acting director Todd Lyons to appear in court to explain why ICE had not complied with an earlier court order for the release of Juan Tobay Robles from detention. Robles was then released before the date on which Lyons had been ordered to appear. Schiltz found that ICE had violated at least 96 court orders in Minnesota since January 1, 2026.

After Schiltz and other district judges spoke with The New York Times in mid-September 2026 about Metro Surge and said the government had "created a grave threat to the rule of law", U.S. Attorney General Todd Blanche announced his department had filed ethics charges against them with the Eighth Circuit Court of Appeals. Schiltz later defended his and his colleagues' comments in a public forum about the operation, saying he had both a right and a duty to defend judicial independence. The Trump administration's complaint was signed by Trent McCotter and Stanley Woodward Jr. The administration previously filed a misconduct complaint against James Boasberg which was dismissed.

== Selected scholarly works ==
- Schiltz, Patrick J. (1997). "Legal Ethics in Decline: The Elite Law Firm, the Elite Law School, and the Moral Formation of the Novice Attorney". Minnesota Law Review. 82 (3): 705–92.
- — (1999). "On Being a Happy, Healthy, and Ethical Member of an Unhappy, Unhealthy, and Unethical Profession". Vanderbilt Law Review. 52 (4): 871–951.
- — (2003). "The Impact of Clergy Sexual Misconduct Litigation on Religious Liberty". Boston College Law Review. 44 (4/5): 949–76.
- — (2005). "Much Ado About Little: Explaining the Sturm und Drang over the Citation of Unpublished Opinions". Washington and Lee Law Review. 62 (4): 1429–90.
- — (2005). "The Citation of Unpublished Opinions in the Federal Courts of Appeals". Fordham Law Review. 74 (1): 23–80.

== See also ==
- List of law clerks for the ninth seat of the Supreme Court of the United States

Legal offices
Preceded by Richard H. Kyle	Judge of the United States District Court for the District of Minnesota; 2006–2026	Vacant
Preceded by John R. Tunheim	Chief Judge of the United States District Court for the District of Minnesota; 2022–2026	Succeeded by Eric C. Tostrud
