= Robert Renner =

Robert Renner may refer to:

- Rob Renner (born 1954), Canadian politician
- Robert G. Renner (1923–2005), United States federal judge
- Robert Renner (athlete) (born 1994), Slovenian pole vaulter

== See also ==
- Renner (disambiguation)
