= Judge Frank =

Judge Frank may refer to:

- Donovan W. Frank (born 1951), judge of the United States District Court for the District of Minnesota
- Jerome Frank (1889–1957), judge of the United States Court of Appeals for the Second Circuit

== See also ==
- Frank Judge (1946–2021), American poet
