= Baker & Daniels =

American legal firm established in 1863

Baker & Daniels LLP
- Headquarters: Indianapolis, Indiana, United States
- No. of offices: 7
- No. of attorneys: 320
- Major practice areas: General practice
- Date founded: 1863
- Company type: Limited liability partnership
- Dissolved: 2012 (merger with Faegre & Benson to become Faegre Baker Daniels)
- Website: www.bakerdaniels.com

Baker & Daniels LLP is a predecessor to the firm Faegre Baker Daniels LLP (now Faegre Drinker), which resulted after the firm merged in 2012 with Minneapolis-based Faegre & Benson. Baker & Daniels counseled clients in transactional, regulatory, and litigation issues throughout the United States and around the world. Founded in 1863 by Thomas Hendricks, Conrad Baker, and Oscar B. Hord as Baker, Hord, and Hendricks, its founders all died in 1880s. Baker's son, Albert Baker, took ownership of the firm and took on a new partner, Edward Daniels, renaming the firm Baker & Daniels.

The firm's clients included Fortune 500 corporations, regional businesses, local governments, nonprofit organizations, and individuals. Based in Indianapolis, Indiana, Baker & Daniels also had offices in Chicago, Illinois; Washington, D.C.; Fort Wayne and South Bend, Indiana; and Beijing, China.

On January 1, 2012, Baker & Daniels and Faegre & Benson successfully combined firms and began business operations as Faegre Baker Daniels LLP.
