= David S. Doty =

American judge (1929–2026)

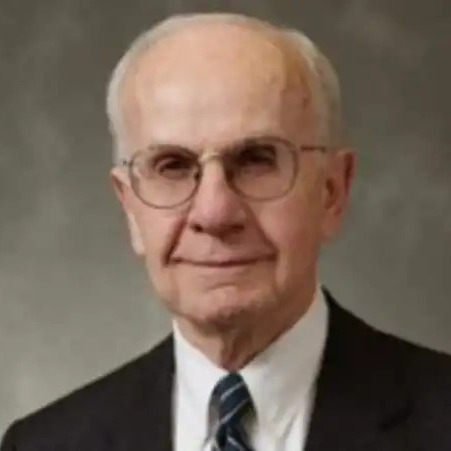

Senior Judge of the United States District Court for the District of Minnesota
- In office June 30, 1998 – June 27, 2026

Judge of the United States District Court for the District of Minnesota
- In office May 8, 1987 – June 30, 1998
- Appointed by: Ronald Reagan
- Preceded by: Miles Lord
- Succeeded by: Donovan W. Frank

Personal details
- Born: David Singleton Doty; June 30, 1929 Anoka, Minnesota, U.S.
- Died: June 27, 2026 (aged 96) Edina, Minnesota, U.S.
- Education: University of Minnesota (BA, JD)

David Singleton Doty (June 30, 1929 – June 27, 2026) was a United States district judge of the United States District Court for the District of Minnesota.

== Life and career ==
Doty was born in Anoka, Minnesota, on June 30, 1929. He received his Bachelor of Arts degree from the University of Minnesota in 1952 and his Juris Doctor from the University of Minnesota Law School in 1961. He had served as a captain in the United States Marine Corps in the interim, from 1952 to 1958. Following graduation he practiced privately in St. Paul, Minnesota for a year. He moved to Minneapolis the next year and practiced there from 1962 to 1987, partly with the Popham Haik law firm. He had also served as a state Special Assistant Attorney General from 1968 to 1969 and as President of the Minnesota State Bar Association from 1984 to 1985.

=== Federal judicial service ===
Doty was nominated by President Ronald Reagan on February 5, 1987, to a seat on the United States District Court for the District of Minnesota vacated by Judge Miles Lord. He was confirmed by the United States Senate on May 7, 1987, and received commission on May 8, 1987. He assumed senior status on June 30, 1998.

Throughout his career as a judge, Doty played a role in labor disputes involving the National Football League (NFL). For nearly 20 years, he oversaw a 1993 class-action settlement, named after lead plaintiff Reggie White, between the league and a group of players seeking free agency. Doty was named in the NFL collective bargaining agreement (CBA) as the ultimate arbiter of grievances or issues between the NFL Players Association and the NFL Management Council. On March 1, 2011, he ruled that the NFL violated the CBA by negotiating a $4 billion payment from their broadcasting partners, in effect purchasing insurance against a potential lockout.

Doty continued to carry a substantial caseload until February, 2026, when he fell ill.

== Death ==
Doty died in Edina, Minnesota, on June 27, 2026, three days before his 97th birthday.

== Sources ==
Legal offices
Preceded by Miles Lord	Judge of the United States District Court for the District of Minnesota; 1987–1998	Succeeded by Donovan W. Frank
