= Faegre & Benson =

Law firm based in Minneapolis, Minnesota

Faegre & Benson LLP
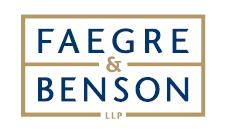
- Headquarters: Minneapolis, Minnesota, U.S.
- No. of offices: 6
- No. of attorneys: 304 in Minnesota (2011)
- Major practice areas: Trial, Corporate, Banking & Commercial, Benefits & Compensation, Environmental, Natural Resources, and Energy, Health, Indian & Gaming, Labor & Employment, Patent, Public Finance, Real Estate, Tax, Trusts & Estates, Trademark
- Key people: Andrew Humphrey, chair of the management committee
- Revenue: $256,500,000 (2010)
- Date founded: 1886
- Founder: Albert Cobb and John Wheelwright
- Company type: Limited liability partnership
- Dissolved: 2012 (merged with Baker & Daniels to become Faegre Baker Daniels)
- Website: www.faegre.com

Faegre & Benson LLP is a predecessor to the firm Faegre Baker Daniels LLP, which resulted after the firm merged in 2012 with Indianapolis-based Baker & Daniels LLP. At the time of the merger it was the largest law firm in Minnesota: as of April 2011 it had 304 attorneys licensed in the state, ahead of Minneapolis-based Dorsey & Whitney with 269. Its gross revenue in 2010 was $256.5 million.

A full-service law firm, Faegre & Benson provided legal counseling and litigation to clients in a wide range of practice areas. On August 11, 2011, Faegre announced that it was in discussions with Baker & Daniels regarding a potential merger. The merger was completed January 1, 2012.

== History ==
The firm was founded in Minneapolis in 1886 as Cobb & Wheelwright. John Cabot Benson, who had clerked at the firm while in law school and who in 1913 founded the organization that became the Legal Aid Society of Minneapolis, returned the following year and had his name added to the firm's in 1919. John Faegre joined in 1923, and from 1940 the firm practised as Faegre & Benson. Benson retired in 1980 after 69 years in practice; he and Faegre died within 23 days of each other in the autumn of 1986, aged 96 and 99.

The firm survived a fire on Thanksgiving 1982 that destroyed the Northwestern National Bank Building, where it was then located. By 2011 it had offices in Minneapolis, Des Moines, Denver, Boulder, London and Shanghai, and its clients included Target, Cargill, Wells Fargo, U.S. Bank, General Mills, Xcel Energy, Boston Scientific, Seagate Technology, Thomson Reuters, Novartis Pharmaceuticals and United HealthCare Services.

=== Merger ===
Faegre & Benson and Baker & Daniels disclosed in August 2011 that they were discussing a combination, after talks that had run for close to two years. The partnerships of both firms voted in favour, and on 12 October 2011 Faegre management committee chair Andrew Humphrey and Baker & Daniels chief executive partner Tom Froehle announced the combination at a joint news conference. The merger took effect on 1 January 2012, creating Faegre Baker Daniels, a firm of 770 lawyers with no designated headquarters. In the previous year's figures, the combined firm would have had gross revenue of $409 million, ranking 68th among the largest United States law firms.

The combination was part of a wider wave of law firm consolidation driven by globalisation and the financial downturn. Tom Clay of the legal consultancy Altman Weil said it was too early to judge whether the merger would succeed, and that he saw no reason for it beyond creating a larger firm.

== Notable attorneys ==
Many notable attorneys have been associates or partners at this firm, including:

- Jacob Frey, politician
- John Hinderaker, attorney and media personality
- Scott Johnson, attorney and media personality
- Tom Miller, politician
- Patrick J. Schiltz, the Chief Judge of the U.S. court for the District of Minnesota
- David Stras, US Circuit Court Judge and Minnesota Supreme Court Justice
- Jake Sullivan, US National Security Advisor
