= Chuck Wiger =

American politician

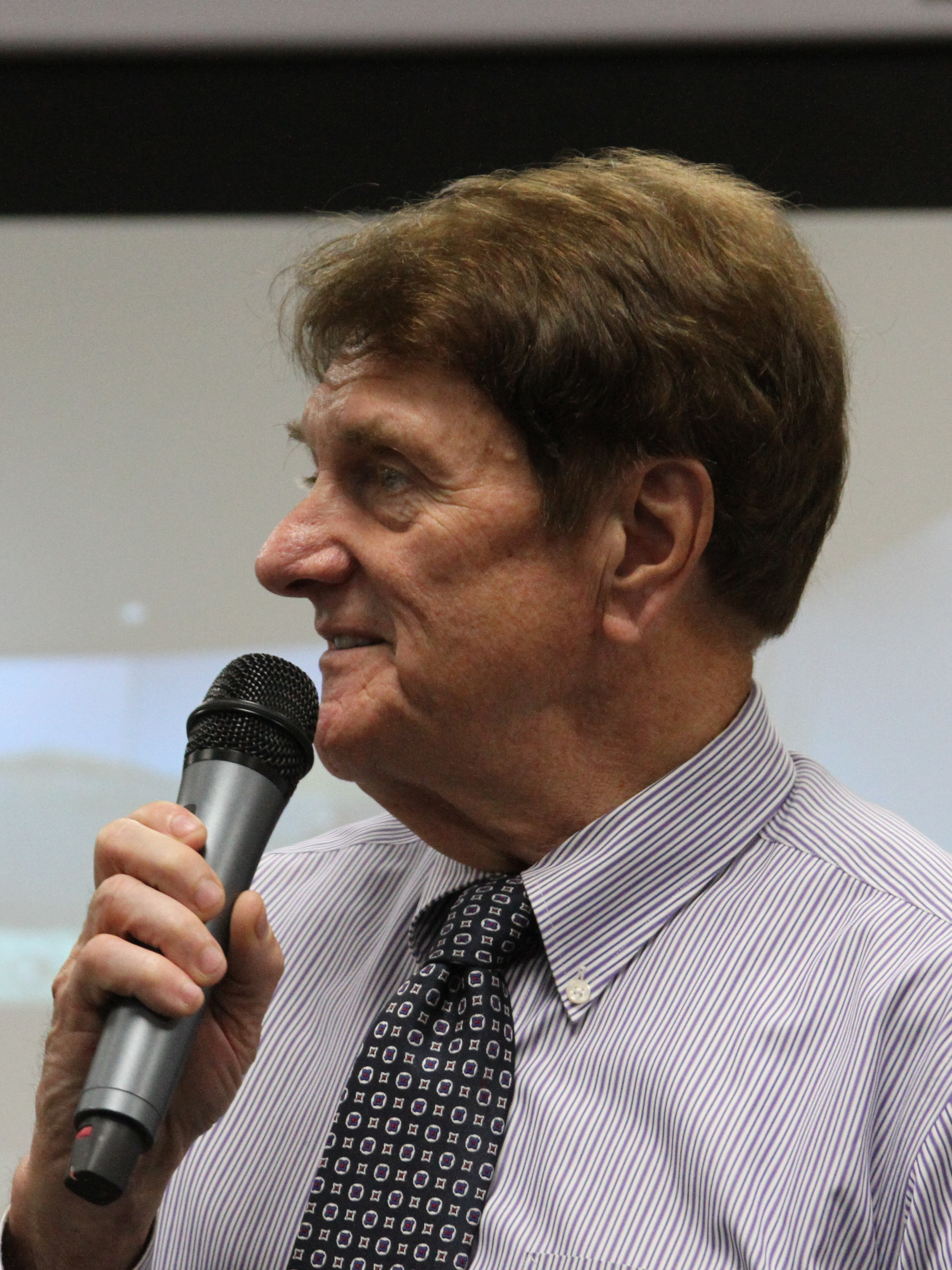
- Wiger in 2019

Member of the Minnesota Senate from the 43rd district 55th (1997–2012)
- In office January 7, 1997 – January 2, 2023
- Preceded by: Kevin Chandler
- Succeeded by: Ann H. Rest

Personal details
- Born: September 14, 1951 (age 75) Saint Paul, Minnesota
- Party: Minnesota Democratic–Farmer–Labor Party
- Children: 5
- Education: Hamline University; University of Colorado; Hamline University School of Law
- Occupation: attorney, writer, legislator

Charles W. "Chuck" Wiger Sr. (/ˈwiːɡər/ WEE-ger; born September 14, 1951) is a Minnesota politician and former member of the Minnesota Senate. A member of the Minnesota Democratic–Farmer–Labor Party (DFL), he represented District 43, which includes parts of Ramsey and Washington counties in the northeastern Twin Cities metropolitan area.

== Early life, education, and career ==
Wiger graduated magna cum laude from Hamline University in Saint Paul in 1974 and earned his J.D. from the Hamline University School of Law in 1977. In 1993 he attended graduate school at the School for Institution Management at the University of Colorado in Boulder.

Wiger has been active in Ramsey County and metropolitan government. He was a member of the Metropolitan Council from 1983 to 1989. He is a former chair and member of the Ramsey County Soil and Water Conservation District, a member of the Ramsey County Parks and Recreation Commission and a liaison to the Metropolitan Parks and Open Space Commission.

Wiger is an attorney and a writer by profession. Before joining the Senate, he managed chambers of commerce.

== Minnesota Senate ==
Wiger was first elected to the Senate in 1996 as a Democratic-Farmer-Labor Party candidate and was reelected five times. During his tenure, he served on the Education, Finance, Environment, Veterans, State and Local Government, Jobs and Community Development, Rules and Administration, and Transportation Committees.

His special legislative concerns included education, economic development, the environment, and water sustainability. The Minnesota Association of Charter Schools named Wiger the 2022 Charter School Champion for championing legislation for public school education in the Minnesota Senate.

== Personal life ==
Wiger has actively served the education community in his area. He was elected to the North St. Paul-Maplewood-Oakdale Community Education Board in 1973 at age 21, and served until 1990. He was also founding chair of the East Communities Youth Service Bureau, and served as a director for Northeast Metropolitan Intermediate School District 916.

His is the father of five children, including Carolyn Wiger, who competed on Survivor 44 and on the third season of The Traitors.
