= Hamline University School of Law =

Private school in Saint Paul, Minnesota, US

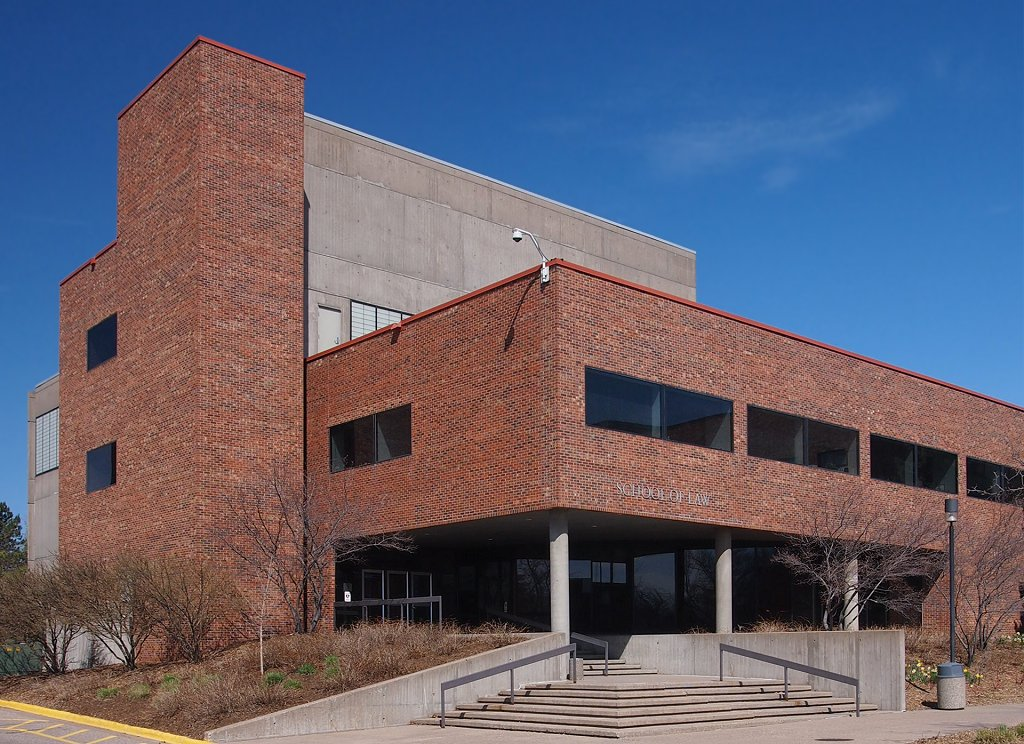
- Established: 1972–2015
- School type: Private university
- Dean: Jean Holloway
- Location: St. Paul, Minnesota, US; 44°57′56″N 93°9′50″W
- Enrollment: 436
- USNWR ranking: Rank not published
- Bar pass rate: 91%
- Website: https://www.hamline.edu/mhsl/

Hamline University School of Law was a private law school affiliated with Hamline University in Saint Paul, Minnesota. It was founded in 1972 as the Midwestern School of Law by a group of legal professionals. In 1976, Midwestern School of Law was absorbed by Hamline University as its own school of law.

On December 9, 2015, Hamline University School of Law merged into William Mitchell College of Law to form Mitchell Hamline School of Law. Mitchell Hamline is also affiliated with Hamline University.

The school was accredited by the American Bar Association.

== Programs ==
Hamline University School of Law offered full- and part-time legal education in pursuit of the Juris Doctor (J.D.) degree, as well as the Master of Law (LL.M.) degree for international lawyers. Dual degrees were available in Public Administration, Business Management, Nonprofit Management, Fine Arts in Creative Writing, and Organizational Leadership.

== Employment, cost, and rankings ==
=== Employment ===
According to Hamline's official employment disclosures required by the ABA, 44.8% of the Class of 2013 obtained full-time, long-term employment requiring a J.D. nine months after graduation. Hamline's Law School Transparency under-employment score was 20.5%, indicating the percentage of the Class of 2013 who are unemployed, pursuing an additional degree, or working in a non-professional, short-term, or part-time job nine months after graduation.

=== Cost ===
Tuition at Hamline for the 2014–2015 academic year was $37,204. The estimated cost of living off-campus for a Hamline law student was $19,883. Assuming no tuition increases, a typical three-year course of study costs $171,261, or $57,087 per year.

=== Rankings ===
For its 2014 rankings, U.S. News & World Report's "Best Law Schools" placed Hamline's overall law school program in a six-way tie at #126 among the 144 law schools it ranked. The 2014 rankings place the Alternative Dispute Resolution (ADR) program fourth among 14 schools, and Hamline's Health Law Institute was ranked 16th of 18 ranked schools. Both institutes continue at Mitchell Hamline School of Law. The four-year average of first-time bar passage rate for Hamline students was about 91%.

== Journals ==
The school published two law journals. The Hamline Law Review was in the top 20% of the Most Cited Law Reviews . The Hamline Journal of Public Law and Policy provided a forum for discussions relating to public policy decisions of the executive, legislative, and judicial branches at all levels of government. Hamline law students staff the Hamline Law Review and the Hamline Journal of Public Law and Policy. With the merger of the schools, the Hamline Law Review merged with the William Mitchell Law Review to become the Mitchell Hamline Law Review. The Hamline Journal of Public Law and Policy merged with the William Mitchell Journal of Law and Practice to become the Mitchell Hamline Law Journal of Public Policy and Practive.

== Athletics ==
The School of Law fielded student-run sports teams, particularly in ice hockey, where it competed in community leagues, intramural competition, and inter-law school competition among the Minnesota-based law schools. Hamline University School of Law and William Mitchell College of Law both fielded hockey teams which competed annually in the Res Ipsa Cup. These teams merged and continue to play under the name The Fighting Eelpouts, according to legend, originally coined for the William Mitchell hockey team by then-Governor Jesse Ventura.

== Notable alumni ==
- Don Betzold, Minnesota state senator
- John Choi, Ramsey County Attorney (Minnesota)
- Donovan Frank, judge, U.S. District Court for the District of Minnesota
- Michael Gableman, justice, Wisconsin Supreme Court
- Jerry Hogan, former executive vice-president and general counsel of CWT
- John Lesch, Minnesota state representative
- Paul Magers, news broadcaster
- Carly Melin, Minnesota state representative
- Rosalia "Sally" Olsen, Minnesota state representative, appellate judge, Minnesota Workers' Compensation Court of Appeals (WCCA)
- Tim Purdon, 18th U.S. Attorney for the District of North Dakota
- Rich Ruohonen, curler
- Jasper Schneider, USDA Rural Development state director for North Dakota
- Eric Swanson, attorney
- Van Tran, California assemblyman
- Charles Wiger, Minnesota state senator

== See also ==
- List of defunct law schools in the United States
