= Richard H. Kyle =

American judge (1937–2021)

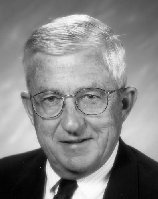

Senior Judge of the United States District Court for the District of Minnesota
- In office May 31, 2005 – June 22, 2021

Judge of the United States District Court for the District of Minnesota
- In office May 13, 1992 – May 31, 2005
- Appointed by: George H. W. Bush
- Preceded by: Robert G. Renner
- Succeeded by: Patrick J. Schiltz

Personal details
- Born: Richard House Kyle; April 30, 1937 St. Paul, Minnesota
- Died: June 22, 2021 (aged 84)
- Education: University of Minnesota (BA, LLB)

Richard House Kyle (April 30, 1937 – June 22, 2021) was a United States district judge of the United States District Court for the District of Minnesota.

== Education and career ==
Born in St. Paul, Minnesota, Kyle received a Bachelor of Arts degree from the University of Minnesota in 1959 and a Bachelor of Laws from the University of Minnesota Law School in 1962. He was a law clerk for Judge Edward Devitt of the United States District Court for the District of Minnesota from 1962 to 1963. He was a state solicitor general in the Office of the Minnesota State Attorney General from 1968 to 1970. He was in private practice in St. Paul from 1963 to 1992.

== District court service ==
On March 20, 1992, Kyle was nominated by President George H. W. Bush to a seat on the United States District Court for the District of Minnesota vacated by Judge Robert G. Renner. Kyle was confirmed by the United States Senate on May 12, 1992, and received his commission on May 13, 1992. He assumed senior status on May 31, 2005 and was succeeded by Patrick J. Schiltz. Kyle died on June 22, 2021, aged 84.

== Sources ==
Legal offices
Preceded by Robert G. Renner	Judge of the United States District Court for the District of Minnesota; 1992–2005	Succeeded by Patrick J. Schiltz
