= Mark C. Gordon =

American academic administrator

Mark C. Gordon is an American academic administrator, lawyer, and former government official. He served as the president of Defiance College from 2009 to 2015 as well as the first dean and president of the Mitchell Hamline School of Law.

== Early life and education ==
Gordon grew up in New York City, received his bachelor's degree from Columbia University, master's degree from School of International and Public Affairs, Columbia University, and graduated magna cum laude from Harvard Law School, where he concurrently worked as a teaching assistant at Harvard Kennedy School.

== Career ==
He began his career in government as a staffer to New York Governor Mario Cuomo, and then as deputy assistant secretary for operations and general deputy assistant secretary for community planning and development in the United States Department of Housing and Urban Development in the Clinton Administration.

He became an associate professor at the Columbia University School of International and Public Affairs in 1996, and directed the Urban Habitat Project from 1997 to 2002.

In 2002, Gordon became dean of the University of Detroit Mercy School of Law and served in that position until 2009, when he became president of Defiance College, a private college in Defiance, Ohio.

In 2015, he was named dean and president of the newly created Mitchell Hamline School of Law in Saint Paul, Minnesota. Gordon stepped down from the position in 2019 to begin a year-long sabbatical to create a program that helps youths from foster care and other disadvantaged backgrounds access higher education, while remaining on the faculty of the law school.
