= Mitchell Hamline School of Law =

Private law school in Saint Paul, Minnesota, USA

Coordinates: 44°56′31″N 93°8′17″W

- Established: 2015; 11 years ago
- School type: Private law school
- Endowment: $64.2 million (2025)
- Dean: Camille M. Davidson
- Location: Saint Paul, Minnesota, United States
- Enrollment: 1,226
- USNWR ranking: 152nd (tie) (2026)
- Bar pass rate: 72.3% (2023 first-time takers, all jurisdictions)
- Website: mitchellhamline.edu
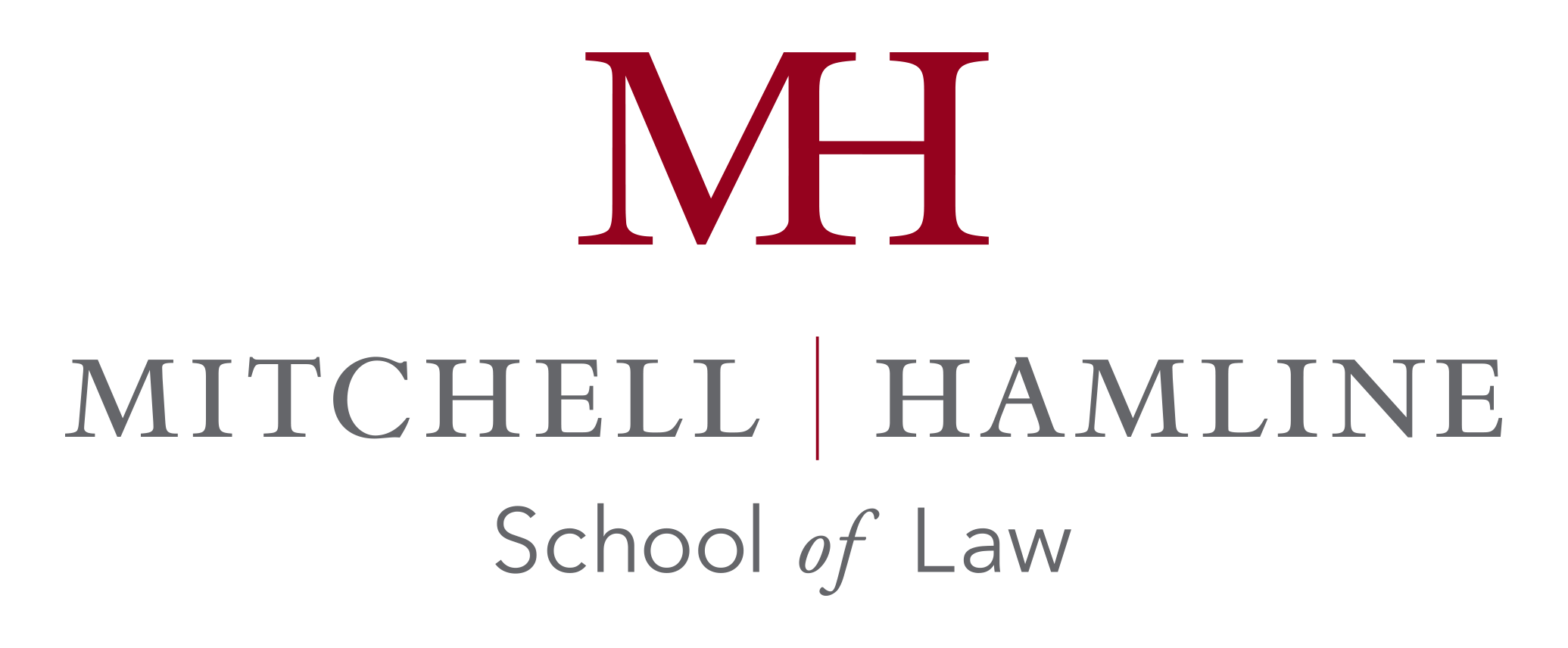

The Mitchell Hamline School of Law is a private law school in Saint Paul, Minnesota, United States. It is accredited by the American Bar Association and offers full- and part-time Juris Doctor degree programs. The school was established on December 9, 2015, by the merger of the Hamline University School of Law and the William Mitchell College of Law.

== History ==
Mitchell Hamline was formed on December 9, 2015, by the merger of Hamline University School of Law and William Mitchell College of Law. Prior to merging into Mitchell Hamline, William Mitchell itself was the product of the merger of several other law schools, all in the Twin Cities. Mark C. Gordon served as the founding dean of Mitchell Hamline before stepping down in 2019.

== Profile, tuition, rankings, and employment ==
In fall 2022, Mitchell Hamline accepted 65% of applications it received; 55% of those who were accepted, or 341 students, enrolled. The median LSAT for students starting in fall 2022 was 152, while the median GPA was 3.33; 69% of students enrolled in the part time track. In total, the school has 1,211 students, 58% of whom are women, 7% of whom are Hispanic, and 8% of whom are Black.

The school was ranked by U.S. News & World Report between 147th and 193rd in the country (bottom 25%) in 2023. Mitchell Hamline was ranked ninth in the nation in dispute resolution.

Of 331 students who graduated in 2021, 41.7% found full-time long-term employment that requires a J.D. (i.e., as attorneys) within nine months of graduation. Of the 180 Mitchell Hamline graduates who took the Minnesota bar exam for the first time in 2021, 120 passed, for a 66.67% pass rate, 12.81% below the pass rate for all ABA approved law school graduates taking the Minnesota bar (79.48%), 13.43% below the pass rate for University of St. Thomas School of Law (80.1%) and 29.03% below the pass rate for the University of Minnesota Law School (95.7%). Of the 309 Mitchell Hamline graduates who took any state's bar exam in 2021, only 59.55% passed.

== Academics ==
=== Health Law Institute ===
Mitchell Hamline's Health Law Institute offers specialized courses and experiential learning.

=== Indian Law Program ===
The Indian Law Program emphasizes practical legal education with faculty who have spent their careers working with Indian tribes.

=== Blended learning ===
In the early 2000s the American Bar Association's Task Force on the Future of Legal Education drafted a recommendation that law schools be permitted to experiment and innovate. At that time, Mitchell Hamline was still William Mitchell College of Law. The school's first cohort of hybrid students included 85 students, 14 of whom already held M.B.A.s, 5 held M.D.s, and three held PhDs. The students ranged in age from 22 to 67 and represented 30 states and two countries.

=== Student journals ===
Mitchell Hamline students can participate in several academic journals, including the flagship Mitchell Hamline Law Review; Cybaris, an Intellectual Property Law Review; and the Mitchell Hamline Journal of Public Policy and Practice.

=== Externships ===
The school offers more practical externships than any other school in the Upper Midwest.
