= Hamline Law Review =

The Hamline Law Review was the flagship academic journal of the School of Law at Hamline University, St. Paul, Minnesota. The law review was published three times annually by the students of Hamline University School of Law. The Hamline Law Review was established in 1978. In 2007, it was in the top 20% of the Most Cited Law Reviews (tied with Energy Law Review at #379), based upon the number of times its articles have been cited by other journals. The journal ceased publication in 2015 when the Hamline School of Law merged with the William Mitchell College of Law to form Mitchell Hamline School of Law. The journal was succeeded by the merged Mitchell Hamline Law Review.
