= New Criminal Law Review =

- Discipline: Law
- Language: English
- Edited by: Carrie Leonetti

Publication details
- Former name: Buffalo Criminal Law Review
- History: 1997–present
- Publisher: University of California Press (United States)
- Frequency: Quarterly

Standard abbreviations
- Bluebook: New Crim. L. Rev.
- ISO 4: New Crim. Law Rev.

Indexing
- ISSN: 1933-4192 (print); 1933-4206 (web)
- OCLC no.: 71314977

Links
- Journal homepage; Articles Online

The New Criminal Law Review (ISSN 1933-4192) is a quarterly peer-reviewed law journal published by University of California Press. It was established in 1997 as the Buffalo Criminal Law Review, but changed names in 2007 after the University of California Press took responsibility for publishing the journal. The New Criminal Law Review focuses on examinations of crime, philosophy of criminal law, and punishment in domestic, transnational, and international contexts.

The New Criminal Law Review is ranked as the seventh best criminal law journal.

== Notable papers ==
This is a list of notable papers that have appeared in the journal.

- George P. Fletcher, "The Fall and Rise of Criminal Theory", 1(2) Buff. Crim. R. (1998).
- Nicola Lacey, "Philosophy, History and Criminal Law Theory", 1(2) Buff. Crim. R. (1998).
- Markus Dirk Dubber, "The Victim in American Penal Law: A Systematic Overview", 3(1) Buff. Crim. R. (1998).
- Paul Robinson, "Structuring Criminal Codes to Perform Their Function", 4(1) Buff. Crim. R. (2000).
- Bernard E. Harcourt, "Joel Feinberg on Crime and Punishment: Exploring the Relationship Between The Moral Limits of the Criminal Law and The Expressive Function of Punishment", 5(1) Buff. Crim. R. (2002).
- R.A. Duff, "Virtue, Vice, and Criminal Liability: Do We Want an Aristotelian Criminal Law?", 6(1) Buff. Crim. R. (2003).
- Dennis J. Baker, "Moral Limits of Criminalizing Remote Harms", 10(3) New Crim. R. (2007).
