= Jerry Hogan =

Australian rules footballer

Personal information
- Full name: Jeremiah Michael Hogan
- Born: 6 September 1891; Bungaree, Victoria
- Died: 21 April 1969 (aged 77); Heidelberg, Victoria
- Original team: Trafalgar

Playing career^{1}
Years	Club	Games (Goals)
1911–12	Richmond	4 (4)
- ^{1} Playing statistics correct to the end of 1912.

Jeremiah Michael Hogan (6 September 1891 – 21 April 1969) was an Australian rules footballer who played with Richmond in the Victorian Football League (VFL).

Hogan made his debut on Saturday, 26 August 1911 against Richmond.
