= Faegre Drinker =

American law firm

Faegre Drinker Biddle & Reath LLP
- No. of attorneys: Over 1,200
- Key people: Gina Kastel, Chair
- Revenue: $1,061,555,000 (2024)
- Date founded: February 1, 2020
- Company type: Limited Liability Partnership
- Website: www.faegredrinker.com

Faegre Drinker Biddle & Reath, also known as Faegre Drinker, is a full-service international law firm and one of the 100 largest law firms in the United States. Formed in February 2020 by the merger of Faegre Baker Daniels LLP and Drinker Biddle & Reath, the firm provides legal counseling and litigation to a wide range of clients across many practice areas.

Faegre Drinker Consulting, the firm's national advisory and advocacy practice, provides public and private clients with consulting services.

== History ==
=== Drinker Biddle & Reath ===
The firm, later known as Drinker, Biddle & Reath, was founded in Philadelphia in 1849 by John Christian Bullitt.

Bullitt would become a civic figure in Philadelphia, serving as a delegate to the Pennsylvania Constitutional Convention of 1873 and drafting the "Bullitt Bill," which became the Philadelphia City Charter in 1887. He also founded the Fourth Street National Bank in 1886, and in 1871, he oversaw the brokerage firm merger that created Drexel, Morgan & Co., later renamed J.P. Morgan & Co.

His partner was Samuel Dickson, who joined in 1863. Dickson forged a long relationship between the firm and the University of Pennsylvania, acting as counsel to the university and serving on its board of trustees from 1881 until his death in 1915. Together, Bullitt and Dickson created one of the most successful and lucrative law offices in Philadelphia.

Henry S. Drinker Jr. joined the firm in 1904, became a partner in 1918, and was named counsel to the University of Pennsylvania in 1927. From the 1920s until the 1950s, Drinker was the executive voice of the firm. Thomas Reath joined the firm in 1919. Charles J. Biddle joined the firm in 1924 as the firm's first lateral partner, bringing from his former firm several clients, including the Philadelphia Contributionship (the nation's oldest property insurance company, founded by Benjamin Franklin) and the Philadelphia Saving Fund Society (at the time the third-largest savings bank in the United States). Biddle became a partner in 1925 and was a major force at the firm for decades.

At the turn of the 21st century, Drinker Biddle began a series of mergers that raised its national profile. In 1999, it merged with the prominent New Jersey general practice firm of Shanley & Fisher, P.C., with offices in northern New Jersey and, until 9/11, at One World Trade Center in New York City. In 2001, Drinker Biddle merged with two more firms: the Philadelphia intellectual property firm of Seidel, Gonda, Lavorgna & Monaco, and the San Francisco firm of Preuss Shanagher Zvoleff & Zimmer. In 2007, the firm merged with Chicago's Gardner Carton & Douglas, giving Drinker Biddle a stronger presence in the Midwest and adding expertise in health law, employee benefits and executive compensation, hedge funds, and government and regulatory affairs. The Gardner merger also made Drinker Biddle, in terms of number of attorneys, one of the 75 largest law firms in the United States.

=== Baker & Daniels ===
In 1863, Hendricks & Hord was founded in Indianapolis, Indiana, by Oscar Hord, a former Indiana Attorney General and U.S. Senator Thomas A. Hendricks, who later served as governor of Indiana and U.S. vice president under Grover Cleveland. Following several name changes, the firm became known as Baker & Daniels in 1888.

=== Faegre & Benson ===
Faegre & Benson was established in Minneapolis in 1886 as Cobb & Wheelwright, and was the largest law firm in the Twin Cities.

=== Faegre Baker Daniels ===
On January 1, 2012, Faegre & Benson and Baker & Daniels began business operations as Faegre Baker Daniels LLP. The combination was presented as a merger of equals: the combined firm had no official "headquarters," and the leaders of each original firm retained a management role. Faegre chair Andrew Humphrey became managing partner of the combined firm, while Baker & Daniels CEO Thomas Froehle Jr. became its chief operating partner.

Faegre Baker Daniels's first new office opened on July 1, 2013: a Silicon Valley office in East Palo Alto, California, that initially focused on offering intellectual property services. In March 2017, the firm opened a Los Angeles office that offered business, employment, intellectual property, and product liability litigation and consulting.

Faegre Baker Daniels reportedly represented USA Gymnastics in the investigation of former team doctor Larry Nassar and participated in reporting Nassar to the FBI during the summer of 2015.

=== Faegre Drinker Biddle & Reath ===
In February 2020, Faegre Baker Daniels LLP and Drinker Biddle & Reath merged.

== Practice areas ==
Faegre Drinker has more than 1,200 professionals across the United States, London, and Shanghai. The firm handles complex legal matters for clients ranging from startups to multinational corporations. Faegre Drinker also offers lobbying, advocacy, and consulting services.
