= Robert G. Renner =

American judge

Senior Judge of the United States District Court for the District of Minnesota
- In office February 22, 1992 – March 1, 2005

Judge of the United States District Court for the District of Minnesota
- In office February 20, 1980 – February 22, 1992
- Appointed by: Jimmy Carter
- Preceded by: Seat established by 92 Stat. 1629
- Succeeded by: Richard H. Kyle

Magistrate Judge of the United States District Court for the District of Minnesota
- In office 1977–1980

Personal details
- Born: Robert George Renner; April 2, 1923 Nevis, Minnesota, U.S.
- Died: March 1, 2005 (aged 81) Roseville, Minnesota, U.S.
- Education: Saint John's University (BA); Georgetown University (JD)

Robert George Renner (April 2, 1923 – March 1, 2005) was a United States district judge of the United States District Court for the District of Minnesota.

== Education and career ==
Renner was born in Nevis, Minnesota. He served in the United States Army during World War II from March 1943 to January 1946 and became a corporal. He received a Bachelor of Arts degree from Saint John's University in Minnesota in 1947 and a Juris Doctor from Georgetown Law in 1949. He was in private practice in Walker, Minnesota from 1949 to 1969. He was a Minnesota state representative from 1957 to 1969. He was the United States Attorney for the District of Minnesota from 1969 to 1977.

=== Federal judicial service ===
In 1977 Renner was appointed as a United States magistrate judge for the United States District Court for the District of Minnesota and served in that role until 1980. He was nominated by President Jimmy Carter on November 30, 1979, to the United States District Court for the District of Minnesota, to a new seat created by 92 Stat. 1629. He was confirmed by the United States Senate on February 20, 1980, and received his commission the same day. He assumed senior status on February 22, 1992. Renner served in that capacity until his death of a heart attack on March 1, 2005, in Roseville, Minnesota.

Legal offices
Preceded by Seat established by 92 Stat. 1629	Judge of the United States District Court for the District of Minnesota; 1980–1992	Succeeded by Richard H. Kyle
