= Donovan W. Frank =

American judge (born 1951)

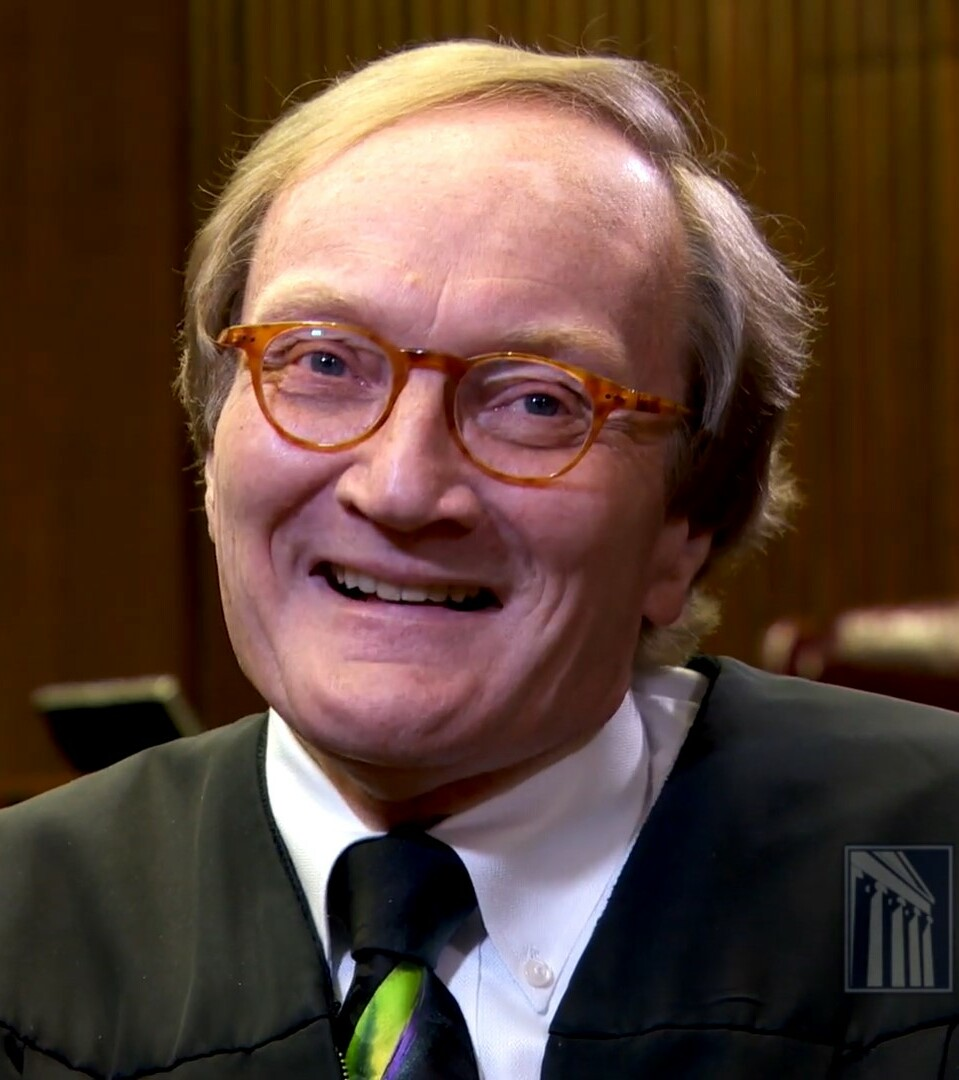
- Frank in 2019

Senior Judge of the United States District Court for the District of Minnesota
- Incumbent
- Assumed office October 31, 2016

Judge of the United States District Court for the District of Minnesota
- In office October 22, 1998 – October 31, 2016
- Appointed by: Bill Clinton
- Preceded by: David S. Doty
- Succeeded by: Eric C. Tostrud

Personal details
- Born: 1951 (age 74–75) Rochester, Minnesota, U.S.
- Education: Luther College (BA); Hamline University (JD)

Donovan Wayne Frank (born 1951) is a senior United States district judge of the United States District Court for the District of Minnesota.

== Early life and education ==
Frank was born in Rochester, Minnesota. He received a Bachelor of Arts degree in 1973 from Luther College in Decorah, Iowa, and a Juris Doctor degree in 1977 from the Hamline University School of Law in Saint Paul, Minnesota.

== Career ==
Frank began his legal career as an assistant county attorney in St. Louis County, Minnesota. In 1985, he was appointed a state district court judge in Minnesota's Sixth Judicial District. Frank served as an assistant chief judge of that court from 1988 to 1991. He was Chief Judge from 1991 to 1996.

=== Federal judicial service ===
On May 21, 1998, President Bill Clinton nominated Frank to the seat on the United States District Court for the District of Minnesota vacated by David S. Doty. He was confirmed on October 21, 1998 and later received his commission on October 22, 1998. He assumed senior status on October 31, 2016.

== Personal life ==
Frank credits Judge Mitchell A. Dubow for championing disability laws:

As an assistant attorney for St. Louis County, Judge Frank tried a case before a jury that involved the first felony child sexual abuse case in the state of Minnesota in which expert testimony was allowed to explain why young children do not report sexual abuse and why mothers often support the father or the boyfriend who is accused of the abuse. The expert was allowed to testify that the child’s behavior was consistent with that of other child sexual abuse victims with whom the expert had worked. Judge Frank also handled the appeal of the case to the Minnesota Supreme Court. In State v. Myers, 359 N.W.2d 604 (Minn. 1984), the Minnesota Supreme Court unanimously affirmed the receipt of such testimony for the first time. The decision remains the law to this day. Judge Frank credits a courageous state trial judge, Mitchell A. Dubow, for the result.

Legal offices
Preceded by David S. Doty	Judge of the United States District Court for the District of Minnesota; 1998–2016	Succeeded by Eric C. Tostrud
